= Madison County Courthouse =

Madison County Courthouse may refer to:

- Madison County Courthouse (Alabama)
- Madison County Courthouse (Arkansas), Huntsville, Arkansas, listed on the National Register of Historic Places (NRHP)
- Madison County Courthouse (Florida), Madison, Florida
- Madison County Courthouse (Georgia), Danielsville, Georgia
- Madison County Courthouse (Iowa), Winterset, Iowa, NRHP-listed
- Madison County Courthouse (Idaho), Rexburg, Idaho, NRHP-listed
- Madison County Courthouse (Kentucky), Richmond, Kentucky, NRHP-listed
- Madison County Courthouse (Mississippi), a Mississippi Landmark
- Madison County Courthouse (Missouri), Fredericktown, Missouri, NRHP-listed
- Madison County Courthouse (Montana), a county courthouse in a NRHP-listed historic district
- Old Madison County Courthouse, Morrisville, New York
- Madison County Courthouse (North Carolina), Marshall, North Carolina, NRHP-listed
- Madison County Courthouse (Ohio), London, Ohio, NRHP-listed in Madison County, Ohio
- Madison County Courthouse (Tennessee), Jackson, Tennessee
- Madison County Courthouse (Texas), Madisonville, Texas
- Madison County Courthouse (Virginia), Madison, Virginia, NRHP-listed
  - Madison County Courthouse Historic District, Madison, Virginia

== See also ==
- Madison Parish Courthouse, Tallulah, Louisiana
