= Bella (deer) =

New York tamed deer

- Bella in spring 2017
- Species: White-tailed deer
- Sex: Female
- Born: June 8, 2009
- Died: c. 2017? (aged 8)
- Residence: Pulaski, Oswego County, New York, United States

Bella (June 8, 2009 – c. 2017?) was a female white-tailed deer who lived in the Oswego County, located in New York. She was born on June 8, 2009, where she was found near her deceased mother (killed by a car crash) by a farm couple named Randy and Julie Joss. The family raised Bella temporarily at their farm in the village of Pulaski, with one of their children giving her the name and a German Shepherd acting as her surrogate mother. She headed to a forest the same year to move in with a local deer herd, who rejected her. As a result, she moved back to Pulaski the same year she was born.

Bella regularly interacted with the village's residents by walking with them, allowing for close photographs, playing with their dogs and cats, and being pet and fed by them. Because of her friendly demeanors combined with her frequent stays in the residence and capability in navigating her surroundings, she became iconic to the locals to the point where she was considered an unofficial mascot of Pulaski. Despite her tame nature, she was largely independent and consumed yard and wild plants on her own accord, her favorite plants being hostas. The deer was also provided care for her health, such as being given medicine for fleas and ticks and having her hooves trimmed. Bella had interacted with Pulaski's residents for over eight years and has a Facebook page where her fans uploaded many images of her.

Beginning in 2017, Bella limped due to an abscess on one of her legs and mostly no longer accepted people closely approaching her. She was last seen in mid-October visiting the Joss family farm, where she allowed the family to pet her and interacted with the place for the last time before departing for the woods. Her ultimate fate remains unknown, although local officials presumed by December that she had eventually perished. Bella's legacy was honored by US Representative Claudia Tenney for a congressional session the same month. The local non-profit Preservation Revitalization of Pulaski (PROP) raised enough funds and donations from a GoFundMe campaign, Community Bank, N.A. and the Greater Pulaski Community Fund in 2018 to commission a statue of Bella, which was constructed by multiple companies like Design Toscano and Kellogg Memorials. The statue was placed near a Community Bank, N.A. location within Pulaski in September 2021 as a memorial dedicated to her memory and home.

== Biography ==
Bella, a white-tailed deer from the village of Pulaski, New York (located in Oswego County), was born on June 8, 2009. Her mother was killed by traffic collision from a car shortly after, resulting in a nearby farming couple named Randy and Julie Joss deciding to "kind of" take the fawn in. Bella lived in their barn during her first winter there and often slept at a doghouse. She was named by one of the couple's children and was fed by the family, occasionally consuming bacon and eggs among other meals. The Joss family's German Shepherd cared for Bella as a surrogate mother. Bella eventually left the farm on her own, where she frequently wandered around Pulaski and near Salmon River. New York state law legally bars residents from feeding deer or taking them in as pets. Although deer that are deemed too comfortable around humans are typically killed by the New York State Department of Environmental Conservation due to human safety concerns, Bella was made an exception. Residents living in the area quickly found out then that she was relatively tame around them. Previously before returning, Bella attempted to move in with a local deer herd at a forest but was rejected and injured by them. She gained public attention for her friendliness among Pulaski residents in 2009.

According to county legislator Shawn Doyle in 2014, a resident originally had the deer wear a red collar (journalist David Figura confirmed that it was given in fall of 2009) to keep her protected from harm during hunting season, but locals later took it off because it made Bella uncomfortable and risked getting her tangled into brushes.

Bella frequently interacted with local residents in friendly manners, reportedly laying at front porches of some residences, tagging along with people who were walking or jogging, playing with dogs and cats, hanging around fishermen near the Salmon River's banks, and allowing for locals to take selfies with her. A villager named Tom Hains described her as "enormous" and with a face "unlike any other deer's" including her eyes being "too far apart" from each other. When at the village, she consumed from yards and flower beds and from food that local residents had left out for her. Resident Muriel Clark stated that Bella knew how to navigate through the village on her own and that she liked to visit the lake to drink water there and eat hostas. Her favorite snack was Cap'n Crunch cereal, which the villagers hand-fed her. One person said that the white-tailed deer had a particular appetite for cheeseburgers. Bella had a neat and dark-shaded fur coat and, because she ate well during winters, did not have messy hair unlike with other deer by spring. The deer was well-liked by the locals and allowed them, including children, to pet her. Hains, however, warned that people should be "slow and deliberate" around her, as she was spooked and ran away from "quick motions". Doyle mentioned that Bella was "traffic savvy" in that she looked both ways of a road before crossing it. He also stated that a local veterinarian trimmed her hooves whenever they were too long and that he and a few other residents applied medicine for treating fleas and ticks to her to protect her health. Doyle said in 2010 that Bella "never caused any problems" for the people living near her and that she had almost become "our mascot". Bella was later again suggested as a mascot of Pulaski by a villager named Crystal Barrett, who noted the deer's positive playfulness with her dogs. By 2017, residents largely considered her to be the "unofficial mascot" of Pulaski.

In 2009, New York's Department of Environmental Conservation regional wildlife manager Marie Kautz acknowledged that the deer's close proximity to the residence may have been a "fun" situation but warned that it could possibly be dangerous. The following year in 2010, DEC senior biologist Dave Riehlman confirmed that he received reports of Bella for "about a year" and talked to Pulaski's mayor about her. He ruled out transferring her to a wildlife location, zoo, or deer farms because of fears of the spread of diseases and it being unafraid of humans. In 2014, DEC official Steve Joule expressed concerns regarding the community's attachment to Bella, worrying that the deer was not getting the nutrition she needed and that she could become aggressive from hormones if she were to be pregnant. He also warned of the possibility that Bella, as a wild animal, had the potential to spread diseases to people and their pets. Earlier the same year, New York state assemblyman William A. Barclay, who lived near Pulaski, referred to Bella as "such an institution" for the village and expressed that while he understood the safety concerns from the DEC, Bella had "been grandfathered in". He continued, "I'm amazed at her longevity. She's a deer citizen of Pulaski." Doyle confirmed that Bella was a solitary individual who was never seen around a nearby large herd of deer and that she never mated with any of them nor did she leave any offspring.

According to Figura in 2010, Doyle had a scrapbook of pictures of Bella in various different areas, some of which were of her interacting with people or pets. Bella has a Facebook page created by Randy and Julie Joss where people were able to upload many pictures of the deer. The page was hacked, resulting in Facebook temporarily taking it down. When it was restored, a majority of the pictures of the deer that were uploaded there were lost. The page as of 2015 had 2,200 likes total on its posts and by 2017 had more than 4,000 followers online. The Facebook page also operated as a "community rumor control" to confirm her status in light of reports about deer being hit by cars in or around the village. In 2012, the profile of Bella confirmed that the Facebook page was originally created to "defeat the rumors about my death". In January 2015, a viral Facebook page from the New York news website Newzjunky featured a picture of Bella climbing on the roof of the McCue Dental office.

=== Disappearance ===
In November 2017, amid the beginning of deer hunting season in New York, many Pulaski residents were reportedly concerned about the whereabouts of Bella. Multiple residents confirmed that they last saw her in mid-October limping around. Village resident Tom Jones said that for over seven years, he saw Bella almost every day and he never missed sight of her for more than three days before her last appearance. Doyle explained in 2020 that he saw an abscess on the leg that Bella was limping on and that she stayed away from him, avoiding the anti-tick medicine he usually gave to her before. The former legislator said that Bella had not allowed people to closely approach her to see her medical issues and that she appeared to be unhappy. He continued that the last known sighting of Bella in 2017, during a sunny day, was from the Joss family at their farm where she was first raised. She approached the Joss family, allowing them to pet her. Afterward, she went walking in their pond then headed off into the woods, marking the last time the Joss family saw her. Doyle shared, "It was like she knew … and came to say goodbye."

In December 2017, the community consensus in the village was that Bella had died. Pulaski's village works director Bill Noreault said of Bella, "I think her end has come." Bella's fate has remained unknown since, although villagers had speculated on the causes of her possible death. In 2020, Doyle told Syracuse.com regarding Bella, "She brought a lot of joy to this community."

== Legacy ==
In December 2017, US Representative Claudia Tenney, whose district (NY-22) included Oswego County, gave a speech to the US House of Representatives floor to honor Bella, arguing, "Bella brought joy to this beautiful community... she was a village mascot and the symbol of reciprocity and kindness shown by many in our community." She spoke to Congress that Bella was the mascot of Pulaski and explained to them her early life since her she was found by the Joss family and that she frequently interacted positively with the villagers.

The Preservation Revitalization of Pulaski (PROP), a non-profit local organization, initiated a GoFundMe page in January 2018 to raise funds for the creation of a statue of Bella in South Park in the village. PROP board member Robin Philips hoped that the statue would be tied into the "Light Up Pulaski" for Christmas celebrations where children interact with the statue before sending their letter to Santa Claus. The fundraising campaign and additional donations, including from Community Bank, N.A. and the Greater Pulaski Community Fund, raised more than $3,500 total ($2,750 of which was raised from GoFundMe). The PROP board did research on options for commissioning a Bella statue and chose the statue construction company Design Toscano. The committee then received a $1,000 grant as part of the Community Grant program from the Central New York Community Foundation; the grant was utilized towards commissioning the base for the Bella statue from Kellogg Memorials. Fravel Construction was also commissioned to build a concrete pad for the statue.

The statue of Bella is iron, measures 42 in (1,100 mm) in height and is placed on a granite base with an inscription that reads, "Bella". The tentatively scheduled placement for the statue for winter of 2020 was delayed due to difficulties from the weather. PROP's committee changed their mind about the statue being located at South Park because they felt that the area was too crowded. The Bella memorial was placed on the concrete pad located on a grassy patch that was donated by the nearby Community Bank, N.A. in September 2021. The area was chosen because of its high visibility by Main Street. In December 2021, a volunteer from PROP was set to plant hostas around the statue by spring of 2022 in reference to the plant being Bella's favorite food. Pulaski mayor Jan Tighe said that the deer's positive relationship with the local children was the motivating factor in the memorial's construction and credited both PROP and Community Bank, N.A. for their contributions. The Pulaski branch of the community bank's manager Steven Gaffney revealed that he appealed to his supervisors to give back to their community and was unanimously approved by them. PROP president Margaret Weigel stated that she heard many positive comments from residents about the statue. PROP board member Tiffany Hax saw the statue as a way to secure the home and memory of Bella while Philips praised Kellogg Memorial as "amazing" to work with in creating the statue's base and storing it temporarily. In another news article, Philips argued that the people of Pulaski come together and take care of their own when they see that they needed help, that they considered Bella one of their own.

Erika Howsare, in her non-fiction book on deer in relation to humans, wrote about Bella as an instance of a wider trend of humans regularly interacting with deer in the United States during the modern age.

== See also ==
- Dewey (deer)
- Dillie
