= WGTK =

WGTK may refer to:

- WGTK (AM), a radio station (970 AM) licensed to serve Louisville, Kentucky, United States
- WKVG (FM), a radio station (94.5 FM) licensed to serve Greenville, South Carolina, United States, which held the call sign WGTK-FM from 2013 to 2023
- WWFY, a radio station (100.9 FM) licensed to serve Berlin, Vermont, United States, which held the call sign WGTK from 1991 to 1999
- WFWM, a radio station (91.9 FM) licensed to serve Frostburg, Maryland, United States, which held the call sign WGTK in 1984
