= Securus, Inc. =

Securus Inc
- Founded: 2008
- Headquarters: Cary, North Carolina, United States
- Products: GPS tracking devices
- Owner: BrickHouse Security
- Website: Official website

Securus Inc., was a Cary, North Carolina–based provider of GPS tracking and personal emergency response technology.

The company was founded in 2008 as Positioning Animals Worldwide Inc. and launched SpotLight and SpotLite GPS pet locator in collaboration with American Kennel Club Companion Animal Recovery (AKC CAR). In 2010 the company changed its name to Securus, Inc., to reflect its diversification into new markets. The company's chief executive officer is Chris Newton.

In 2011, Securus, Inc acquired Zoombak, LLC from TruePosition, Inc., a subsidiary of Liberty Media. Zoombak, Inc was known for developing GPS-based products that help people track things, ranging from teenage drivers to employees, pets and automobiles.

In March 2015, it was announced that Securus was selling its personal emergency response service (PERS) platform to Ogden, UT–based Freeus, LLC, sister company of AvantGuard Monitoring Systems. That same month, it was announced that BrickHouse Security acquired Securus, including Zoombak and related brands.

Securus has been involved in buying and selling location data of private citizens that use cell-phones. This has been raised as a privacy concern as it allows Securus to sell for its own profit the "location of nearly any phone in the US without authorization," including to bounty hunters.
