= SkyMall =

Specialty publishing firm

- Company type: Subsidiary
- Industry: E-commerce
- Founded: 1990; 36 years ago
- Founders: Bob Worsley
- Headquarters: Edison, New Jersey, United States
- Owner: C+A Global
- Website: www.skymall.com

SkyMall is a specialty publishing firm headquartered in Ridgefield Park, New Jersey, best known for publishing a self-titled in-flight publication, SkyMall, that at one time had an annual distribution of approximately 20 million copies in airplane seat pockets. At the height of circulation, it reached 88% of US airline passengers. SkyMall is a multi-channel, direct marketer offering products through direct marketers and manufacturers through its SkyMall catalogue and website, skymall.com.

In January 2015, the company filed for Chapter 11 bankruptcy protection. In April 2015, it was purchased in bankruptcy court by C&A Marketing.

== History ==
SkyMall, Inc., was founded in 1990 by Bob Worsley. Originally, it intended to "get customers to order within 20 minutes of landing and have the goods waiting for them on arrival", before it switched to home delivery. Same-day delivery required SkyMall to operate its own warehouses near selected airports.

Shortly after launching, the company purchased contracts from another company that allowed it to offer catalog merchandise to travelers flying U.S. air carriers. This move, which did not receive the support of all of the founders, required a significant shift in SkyMall's focus and operations, ultimately forcing the company to abandon same-day delivery and nearly bankrupting it. The company now offers goods from other companies' catalogs for drop-ship to the customer via third-party transport firms.

The company drastically changed its business model around 1993. Instead of stocking the merchandise itself near airports, SkyMall began leasing sections of the magazines to various distributors which customers would then order from directly. Smithsonian magazine has credited this decision with saving the company.

Since 1999, SkyMall ownership has "bounced around among several private-equity companies", including by Najafi Companies, the largest private equity firm in Arizona in 2012. In 2009 SkyMall's website "generated approximately $80.5 million in revenue", making it the 185th largest e-commerce website by revenue.

On May 17, 2013, SkyMall merged with Xhibit Corp, described as a new "marketing software and digital advertising company that trades on an 'over-the-counter' exchange where equity shares of small companies can be bought and sold". In less than two years, SkyMall, LLC, and several affiliated companies, including its parent company Xhibit Corp., voluntarily filed for Chapter 11 bankruptcy protection in the United States Bankruptcy Court for the District of Arizona on January 22, 2015.

On April 1, 2015, SkyMall was purchased out of bankruptcy court by C&A Marketing for $1.9 million; the new owners plan to re-launch the catalog with a new product selection that will partially downplay the brand's association with novelty items in favor of "more of the innovative, fun, cool products that people are looking for, but that are still in keeping with the DNA of SkyMall."

== Products ==
Although SkyMall started as a conventional retailer, it was quickly realized that consumers weren't as likely to buy them as they were to buy "unconventional items". One of the top-selling items upon the company filing for bankruptcy, for instance, was a Yeti statue. The Washington Post described the catalog's offerings as "whimsical".

== Departments ==
- Apparel & Accessories
- Automotive & Hardware
- Computers
- Electronics
- Health & Wellness
- Home Living
- Office
- Outdoor Living
- Pets
- Seasonal
- Sporting Goods
- Toys, Hobbies & Collectibles
- Travel

== Participating stores ==
- Casio
- Design Toscano
- Diversions Catalog
- Driving Comfort by AutoSport
- Footsmart
- Gadget Universe
- Hammacher Schlemmer
- Improvementscatalog.com
- Plow and Hearth
- Steiner Sports
- Successories
- TigerDirect
- The Greatest Gift

== Airlines with SkyMall on flights ==
- American Airlines and American Eagle - ended January 2015
  - US Airways
  - Trans World Airlines
  - America West Airlines
- United Airlines - ended January 2015
  - Continental Airlines
- Eastern Air Lines
- Delta Air Lines - ended November 2014
  - Northwest Airlines
- Southwest Airlines - ended April 2015
  - AirTran Airways
- Alaska Airlines
- National Airlines
- SkyWest Airlines
  - Atlantic Southeast Airlines
- Frontier Airlines
  - Midwest Airlines
- Sun Country Airlines
