= Thomas G. Pullen =

Thomas Granville Pullen Jr
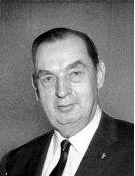
- Thomas G. Pullen, c.1950
- Born: August 2, 1898; Madison County Courthouse, Virginia, US
- Died: November 11, 1979 (aged 81); Catonsville, Maryland, US
- Education: Teachers College Columbia University. Master of Education (Ed.M.), Doctor of Education (Ed.D.)1926
- Alma mater: College of William & Mary (1917)
- Occupation: Educator
- Spouse: Louise Rowe Pullen (m:1922 D: 1933)

Thomas Granville Pullen Jr. (August 2, 1898 – November 11, 1979) was the fifth president of the University of Baltimore from 1964 to 1969. Prior to that, he acted as state superintendent of schools for Maryland from 1942 to 1964.

== Early life ==
Pullen was a son of a Methodist minister and graduate of Randolph–Macon College. Dr. Pullen attended public schools in Virginia. On February 1, 1914, at age 15, Pullen attended William & Mary Academy in preparation to attend the College of William & Mary. Pullen graduated from William & Mary Phi Beta Kappa in 1917.

Pullen pledged to teach in the public schools for 2 years after graduation. He started as a Latin teacher and later principal of Dinwiddie High School in Dinwiddie county Virginia for one year before joining the Marine Corps.

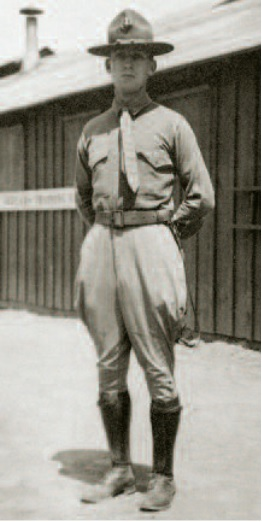
Thomas Granville Pullen Jr. As a Marine recruit in 1917

== Military service ==
At the end of the school year, Pullen enlisted in the United States Marine Corps and sent to the Marine Corps Recruit Depot, Parris Island, South Carolina.

At this time, the Marine Corps was getting a good press coverage and favorable news dispatches from France touting 5th Marines success in driving out entrenched German troops in the Battle of Belleau Wood. Along with 65,000 other recruits Pullen met another fellow Virginian named Lewis B. Puller. Despite their divergent career paths, the two maintained a lifelong friendship.

Pullen years later wrote to historian Burke Davis about his 8 weeks as a recruit at Paris Island:

"The days were exceedingly hot and very long and busy, but we could get

together after chow time in the evenings and walk around the limited space

available to us"

After recruit training, most recruits headed to Europe as part of the Marine Expeditionary Forces. Pullen and his new friend Lewis Puller in September 1918 were assigned to the non-commissioned officer training school at Paris Island as both were college graduates. Before they completed NCO school the armistice was signed ending World War I.

Both Puller and Pullen applied and were accepted to Officer Training Camp starting January 1919 at Marine Barracks Quantico. Pullen graduated June 16, 1919 and appointed to the grade of second lieutenant in the reserves. At graduation, Pullen learned that the Marine Corps was returning to peace time level and that they would be returned to civilian life. On June 25, Pullen was turned into inactive status with the marine Corps. Pullen would later say in a letter to Puller we would have preferred to stay on. In a 1960 letter from Pullen to Puller:

"If I had been offered a permanent commission in the Marine Corps immediately after being commissioned, I should probably have taken it and

spent my days in the service...

There is no question that once a Marine Always a Marine"

Lewis B. Puller went on to become possibly the most decorated Marine in history. Pullen is a member of the Maryland American Legion and chairman of americanism group. General member, National Americanism Council, The American Legion. Pullen had a penchant for using Latin Phases and chocolate.

== Career ==
=== Teaching ===
Pullen became a Latin teacher and later assistant principal at Martinsville High School, Virginia. Then principal Hampton High School Hampton Virginia. Became head of the English department Newport News High School. In 1926 Pullen moved to Maryland to become principal at Catonsville High School catonsville Maryland. President, Newport News (Virginia) Teachers Association, 1923–25. During the summers of 1927 and 1928 he taught at the University of North Carolina. He attended Teachers College, Columbia University Master of Education (Ed.M.) and Doctor of Education (Ed.D.),.

In 1932 Pullen was appointed Superintendent of Schools in Talbot County. He accepted the Maryland State Supervisor of High Schools in 1936 as part of the Maryland State Department of Education.

=== Superintendent of Schools ===
In March 1942, he was appointed State Superintendent of schools. Pullen was honored by his Alma school in 1946 with an Alumni Medallion. At the end of World War II, a post war growth is student population huge growth in teachers, schools, colleges to absorb this growth. During the William Preston Lane Jr. governorship Pullen was responsible for two hundred new buildings or additions, and the average teacher wages increased 53 percent.

During the post-Sputnik fear that the United States was behind the Soviet education system in terms of math and science Maryland Public Schools. A Columbia University professor of education spoke for some commission and approved the guiding philosophy of Pullen and his predecessor

that teachers were to excite students about learning and shape them for society.

In 1947 Maryland's State Superintendent of Schools Thomas Pullen suggests that the University establish a training school for librarians at College Park in conjunction with the Enoch Pratt Library in Baltimore and is the first suggestion of the establishment of a Library Education program at the University of Maryland school of Education. The University of Maryland awarded Pullen in 1947 L.H.D (Latin: litterarum humanarum doctor) Doctor of Humane Letters degree. After the Supreme Court Handed down on May 17, 1954 Brown v. Board of Education ruling Pullen a southern gentleman who experienced a segregated south make sure Maryland would no longer allow a segregated public school system. A south leaning newspaper Hopkinsville Kentucky New Era wrote:

Maryland state teachers colleges have bowed to racial integration but utterances from the Deep South continue the theme of a fight to the finish over the U.S. Supreme Court's ruling on the touchy question. And a leader in the national assn. for the Advancement of Colored People called for complete school integration "by not later that September 1956" The Maryland State Board of Education and the Board of Trustees of the teacher colleges met at Baltimore yesterday and unanimously adopted a resolution declaring that "racial segregation is hereby abolished" Dr. Thomas G. Pullen Jr. superintendent of Maryland schools proposed the resolution. The resolution was Maryland's first statewide banishment of the color bar in schools.

In a June 11, 1955 meeting with all of Marylands County Education superintendents, Pullen made a stirring appeal abolish racial segregation in Maryland Public Schools:

"I hope and pray that we are not going to have the courts cluttered up with a lot of cases. This is a matter of goodwill, good spirit and common sense."

Pullen directed the development of educational television, dealt with the school-age population explosion of the 1950s and 60's, and supervised the desegregation of schools. In 1955 the first application was accepted at Frostburg State Teachers College.

He promoted a statewide system of public libraries and wage improvements for teachers. Pullen moved to have an in-state school for library Science.

Pullen was a strong supporter of a statewide Public/Educational television network statewide.

During the William Preston Lane Jr. governorship Pullen was responsible for two hundred new buildings or additions, and the average teacher wages increased 53 percent. A Columbia University professor of education spoke for some commission and approved the guiding philosophy of Pullen and his predecessor — that teachers were to excite students about learning and shape them for society.

Pullen disputed the 1960 Edwin Warfield III "Governor's Commission on the Expansion of the University of Maryland" to keep the state colleges separate from the University of Maryland system thus maintaining independence of the colleges and the University. Even though the Warfield Plan was endorsed by Governor J. Millard Tawes, and the State Comptroller Louis L. Goldstein Pullen and his board kept the schools independent. The June 1962 "The report of the commiisson for the expansion of Public Higher Education in Maryland." The Pullen Commission.

=== University of Baltimore ===
Pullen retired from the superintendency and became the fifth University President in 1964 bringing with him a new vision of the University of Baltimore's place in the state's educational landscape. That vision included accreditation of academic programs by the regional Middle States Association of Colleges and Secondary Schools and construction of a new university library and expanded classroom facilities, which he knew would be necessary to obtain accreditation. H. Mebane Turner succeeded to the presidency in 1969. Pullen continued his involvement as a trustee and his goals were realized in the fall of 1971 when the new Academic Center opened and the university received full regional accreditation.

== Other activities ==
Pullen founded the Catonsville Historical association.
