= Dillie =

Ohio tamed farm deer

- Dillie in her bedroom, 2013
- Other name: Daffodil
- Species: White-tailed deer
- Sex: Female
- Born: 2004
- Died: April 10, 2022 (aged 18)
- Owners: Melanie R. Butera, Steve Heathman
- Residence: Canal Fulton, Stark County, Ohio, United States
- dilliedeer.com

Dillie (2004 – April 10, 2022), also known by her full name Daffodil, was a female internet celebrity white-tailed deer with impaired vision who lived in the house of the veterinarian Melanie Butera and her husband Steve Heathman at the small city of Canal Fulton, located in Ohio. She was born at a deer farm near the Ohioan city of Canton that was owned by Albert Glick. As a fawn, she was rejected by her biological mother for her blind and weak state of health but was temporarily taken in by another female farm deer named Sweetie, who the farmer noted was friendly to him. He took the fawn to an emergency veterinary clinic but, due to being unable to afford the costs of treating her, offered the deer to the veterinarian and clinic owner Melanie for as long as she was able to save her. After she and the other staff nursed the deer to better health, Butera and Heathman took the fawn home and settled for allowing her in the house due to her vulnerable state and fear of their horses at their barn. Heathman and Butera named her Daffodil after the flowers she was eating at their yard but also decided to assign her the nickname Dillie.

As a permanent house resident, Dillie was described as playful and friendly to both other pets in the house like the poodle Lady and to guests. While her diet most typically consisted of hay and endives, Dillie also ate fruit and human foods like spaghetti noodles, and vanilla bean ice cream. She had a tendency for sleeping on the same bed as her owners but also had her own room and mattress, converted from a guest room and decorated to tailor to her. Dillie first gained public attention in 2009 when her owners won a video contest from Zoombak using a personal GPS locator from their brand to record Dillie sleeping on bed, eating spaghetti, and swimming in their pool. Due to the couple having won the contest because of their deer, various news organizations contacted them to cover their story and therefore made the deer viral online the same year. The following year in 2010, WJW provided Butera the idea of livestreaming Dillie at the couple's residence online to supplement their own news coverage of the deer including after they were done, an idea the couple agreed to under the name "DillieCam". Butera and Heathman had received many emails and physical mails from fans of Dillie around the world expressing their appreciation for them and their story of how Dillie was saved. By 2013, the DillieCam livestreams had received over 1 million views total.

Butera was diagnosed with cancer in 2011; she planned to write her own obituary but changed her mind towards writing a true account of Dillie's life after the deer rested her head on her lap, which reminded her of the significance of life including Dillie's. She finished her account through the completion and self-publication of her non-fiction book Dillie the Deer: Love on Hooves in 2013. After being reached out by a publishing agent, Butera rewrote and expanded the book into a second edition titled Dillie the Deer: A True Story of Love, Healing, and Family, which was published by Regan Arts. She additionally wrote the children's book The Gift: The Story of Dillie the Deer in 2016, with illustrations given by Marjorie Jean. Although DillieCam eventually became inactive, livestreams of the deer were broadcast at the Facebook page for the deer by the couple. Dillie died on April 10, 2022, from declining health; she was 18 years old, making her an exceptionally old individual of her species.

== Biography ==
=== Early life ===
Dillie, a white-tailed deer, was born at a deer farm near the city of Canton (located in Stark County) at Ohio in 2004. The deer farm, owned by a farmer named Albert (or "Al") Glick, had fewer than 30 deer and valued large-sized bucks to sell to other deer farms. Dillie was a triplet along with two other brothers, but her mother rejected her due to her being blind, small, and weak. As a result, Glick thought that the fawn would pass away shortly after. Among the other deer there was a doe named Sweetie; she was unable to produce fawns for a time and therefore had no monetary value to the farm, but Glick bonded with her unlike with other individuals because of her friendliness and her being the only deer to greet him whenever he entered their enclosure. Three nights after Dillie's birth, Glick found Sweetie at a corner of the pen lying close to the fawn. Despite having no milk, she kept the fawn warm and effectively took her in as her own. Dillie had long legs but was smaller than young cats; had cloudy white cataracts on her eyes; had pieces of hay straw stuck on her eyes, nose, and mouth and grew weaker from the lack of milk that Sweetie could offer her. Glick and his wife decided to take Dillie inside to care for her because of her weak state, although Sweetie anxiously followed them to track the baby but was stopped by her owners. They decided that the only way to save Dillie was to take her to a veterinarian, but they knew that such efforts would be too financially costly for them. The situation was further compounded by a ban of Ohioan sales of deer to farms in other states because of the risk of spreading chronic wasting disease, thus crippling the couple's income.^{10–17}

On June, Glick took the three-day-old fawn to the Stark Emergency Clinic, located in Canton where the veterinarian Melanie Butera worked.^{19} He had previous visited the clinic a few weeks prior to save a male fawn who was offspring to a prized buck but passed away by the time he arrived there. Upon arriving there again with Dillie, he told Butera about the female fawn's background. Butera expected that Glick would request euthanasia for the fawn.^{10–12} Instead, he offered her to the veterinarian if she was still able to save the deer, citing her love for deer and her ownership of another barn (while providing goat's milk). The clinic team then used the intravenous catheter for Dillie's jugular veins, wrapped her in a blanket, and placed her in a baby incubator. The fawn began to regain consciousness and, in the next morning, attempted to stand up. Melanie and her husband Steve Heathman found out that the fawn was female and planned on taking her to their home.^{12–18} The couple then drove the fawn to their home at the Ohioan city of Canal Fulton, where they also owned multiple other pets like a black poodle named Lady, an Abyssinian cat named Neffie, and two horses named Kibbles and Cammie.^{19–23}

As Dillie became active in their home, the couple thought about naming her "Daffodil" after the flowers of the same name that the fawn was eating at the backyard. Steve also gave her the nickname "Dillie" as derived from her full name.^{29–30} Menalie's mentor Dean LeBeau talked her out of a possible euthanasia option for Dillie that she initially considered because the state of Ohio banned the rehabilitation of injured deer.^{31–33} Dillie became fully active and quickly gained weight at the end of the first week at the couple's house, exploring around the house despite still having impaired vision, being accompanied by Lady, and becoming particularly attached to Steve such as from following him around and falling asleep in his arms.^{37–38} When they took Dillie to the barn, however, she was frightened by the horses. As she was also too sick to stay outside, they instead settled for allowing her to stay inside the house. In August of the same year, Melanie sold her emergency clinic, laying off the employees there and taking in the clinic cat Spazz.^{73–74} By October, Dillie had improved but still impaired vision and had a playful personality.^{64–65} Dillie began to reject sleeping in her own straw enclosure and instead chose to sleep on the upstairs bed with the couple, leading them to effectively accept her as a "house deer".^{67–68}

=== Later life and fame ===
According to Melanie and Steve, Dillie liked walking outside in mornings and engaging in play activities such as swimming in their pool when it's filled and bouncing on the cover of the pool. They revealed that every three weeks, Dillie ran at 35 miles an hour around their place. The deer's vision for years had improved but remained impaired. She got along well with the dog Lady (at times going underneath her to try being nursed) along with the cats and birds that also resided in their residence. She had learned to climb stairs on her own and was able to obtain ice cubes from the ice machine at the refrigerator's door. The deer also had her own room with a mattress in it. Melanie described Dillie's personality as a mix of "both a dog and cat", that she was "very exceptional" in that she was passive and also "so loving, so smart, so unafraid". Dillie's room, converted from a guest room because of the deer having grown five years since her birth, was decorated by Heathman in a manner that would satisfy her, including with "plush toys, soft lighting, cheerful wall art, and so forth". Melanie also said on CBS' The Early Show that Dillie was "like my daughter and son". She revealed on the show that Dillie was litter-trained and had not destroyed their furniture but periodically did spill their coffee cups and glass. Butera also said that Dillie did not being under windy weather or precipitation like rain or snow. Dillie's dietary schedule – consuming in the mornings and evenings and resting in between – were typical of deer according to Melanie, and the deer usually food like "bananas, apples, bread and greens including spinach and different types of lettuce" but sometimes also ate treats like "vanilla bean ice cream, spaghetti noodles and Lady's Beggin' Strip treats". Dillie had also been capable of grooming herself and had been given vaccinations and treatments to prevent fleas and worms. She had an ear tag on her and a permit from Ohio's Wildlife and Game Commission. In 2009, Dillie weighed 180 lb (82 kg). Dillie was also noted to have been able to turn the bathtub and eat at the dinner table with her owners. In 2015, Butera explained that 90% of her deer's diet consisted of hay and endives.

Dillie first gained national attention in 2009 when she was announced the winner of a video contest from Zoombak the same year. Previously, Butera sought a tracking device to be used on Dillie after she wandered off the summer of the video contest after a delivery man left the yard gate open. As a result, she purchased a personal GPS locator, more specifically a small device that on a collar that Dillie then had worn around her neck, from the Zoombak brand so that she and Heathen could track her on their computer. In response to Zoombak's announcement of a contest showcasing usage of the GPS locator, Butera submitted a video from the device that showed Dellie "sleeping in her bed, swimming in the family pool and eating a bowl of spaghetti noodles". She stated that the video was entered in at the last minute because of various computer problems that delayed her submission process. Under half a day after their submission, Butera found out from a phone call from Zoombak that they received the $1,000 prize. The video of Dillie that won the contest was featured on both the home page of Zoombak and on YouTube. Multiple national news organizations had picked up the story around Dillie, and results 150,000 search results were generated the year of the contest. Butera said that she even received calls from Germany and China to cover the news. Journalists visited the residence to record and take photos of the deer. Dillie tended to be cautious of newly met people but usually bonded with them afterward. Heathman said that she was able to remember people, such as his friends whenever they came to their residence.

Image of a DillieCam livestream session of Dillie at her bedroom from ww.com, 2013

In January 2010, Butera took a call from Mark Zinni of WJW (or Cleveland FOX, known also as Fox 8), explaining that while he wanted a camera segment for Dillie, he proposed having a webcam set up in Dillie's room so that online audiences could view Dillie live even after the end of the news broadcast. He reaffirmed to her that Dillie would become famous online. After a few days, Butera managed to set up a webcam system and found an international server for live broadcasts. Mark and his cameraman broadcast his news segment on Dillie, and the station he was a part of discussed the "DillieCam" online channel, causing it to receive thousands of viewers and emails and letters to the Butera and her husband for both saving the deer and sharing their story. Some of the viewers who sent items to them were children and some others were adults. Heathman set up live events involving Dillie such as "feeding Dillie treats with whipped cream that she splashed all over the place". According to Butera, DillieDam had thousands of views per day and hundreds of people liked posts about Dillie on Facebook. They gained an international audience and reportedly met not only reporters and photographers but also artists and musicians.^{147–149} Dillie's bedroom was broadcast from the webcam on a 24/7 schedule and was available on the official website for the deer, which also provided written context for who she was to visitors. Among the daily activities streamed on DillieCam were daily "tea time" and "snack time" events. At one point, when the webcam went down, the International Space Station sent an email to Butera asking about how Dillie was and when the webcam would resume. By 2013, Butera, who owned the Elmridge Animal Hospital, stated that she received emails regarding Dillie in 16 different languages total. In 2012, Stow Community Church lay minister Carol Zeh, who occasionally house-sat for the deer's owners, asked Pastor Jim Case to provide blessings for Dillie and the other pets who lived with her. Upon visiting the home of Dillie with several other church members, Case used oil to provide her with a blessing. In 2013, over one million people had watched the livestream of Dillie, and by 2015, Dillie had received more than 1.6 million online views.

In late 2011, Butera learned that she had cancer, more specifically endometrial cancer with an aggressive form of carcinosarcoma. She told her husband about her condition and felt immense stress from it, feeling that she needed to sell her own business.^{170–172} In 2012, she was told that she only had six months left. In light of her condition, Butera initially prepared to write her own obituary. However, she then changed her mind and, on a notebook, write on pen the story of Dillie since her early age. The veterinarian credited her change of plans to Dillie laying her head on her lap while she started writing her obituary, which caused her to reflect on how the deer as a fawn was saved by the married couple and that everyone could make a difference. She wrote and self-published on her account on Dillie's life called Dillie the Deer: Love on Hooves in 2013. After she was contacted by a publishing agent regarding her first book, she added approximately a hundred extra pages total (although she removed some parts from it) that focused on additional aspects of Dillie's life. The result was the publication of the 2015 book Dillie the Deer: A True Story of Love, Healing, and Family by Regan Arts. The 2015 edition book's editor Alexis Gargagliano explained that Dillie was "easy to love" for her "boundless affection, mischief-making, and general enthusiasm for life" and described Butera as an inspiring veterinarian for her engaging stories on life and relations between animals and people. Butera saw the 2013 book as a way to preserve her legacy and chronicle the various people she had met in her life since adopting the fawn in 2004. The Daily Record writer Ashley Finley described the account as containing both humorous events involving the couple's animals and serious ones from Butera's experiences at the clinic. Butera in 2016 then wrote the children's book The Gift: The Story of Dillie the Deer, whose illustrator was Marjorie Jean.

In 2021, Butera had been in remission from her endometrial cancer for five years; she credited her strength to her husband, Dillie, and fans of the deer. Because she reached 17 years in age, Dillie was a particularly old individual for her age. Butera by then no longer offered her spaghetti or foods with carbohydrates but instead fed her hay, fruits, and a pizza piece during lunch. Although DillieCam by 2021 was no longer active, Dillie was still livestreamed in the morning and at night at Facebook. The private "Dillie the Deer" Facebook page broadcast livestreams of Dillie and Heathman waking up in the bedroom or the deer at either the porch or the swimming pool.

=== Death ===
On April 10, 2022, Butera told Fox 8 that Dillie has passed away at the age of 18. She credited the station for having made her a celebrity and told them that the experiences with the deer brought "so many amazing adventures", created a community of thousands of people, and brought positive memories and friendships. Butera confirmed that Dillie had been struggling with her legs the past few months prior to her death and that she was unable to improve her health. The couple buried Dillie at their residence under a cherry tree. The Facebook page for Dillie remained an active online community for support among each other in late 2022. Heathman was reportedly hit hard by Dillie's death but later expressed appreciation for the Facebook group members, who offered condolences and posted old photos of themselves with Dillie in person in her memory.

== See also ==
- Bella (deer)
- Dewey (deer)
