= James City Historic District =

Historic district in Virginia, United States

- U.S. National Register of Historic Places
- U.S. Historic district
- Virginia Landmarks Register
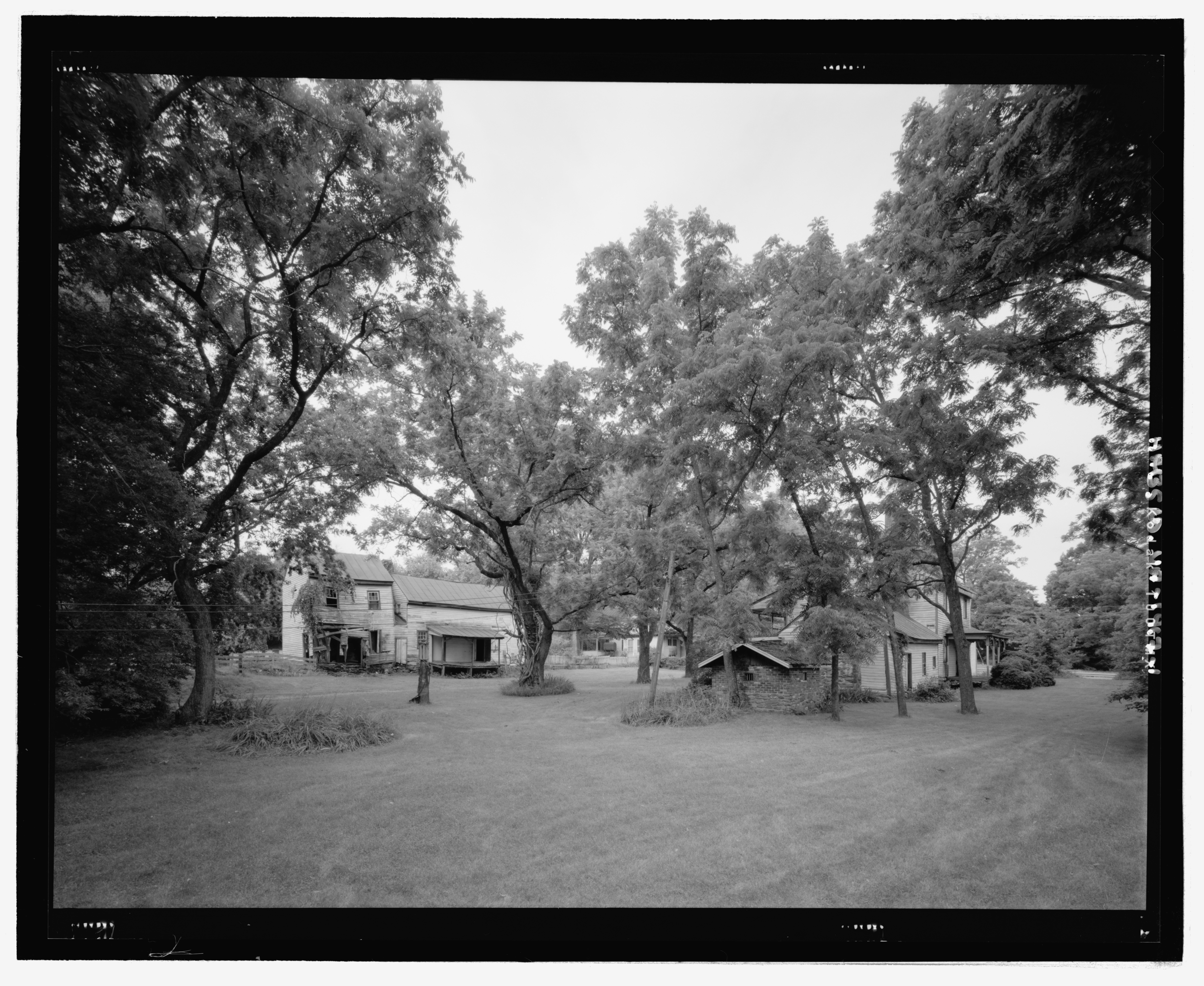
- View of the James City Historic District taken by HABS in 2007

- Location within Virginia Location within the United States
- Location: US 29, near Madison, Virginia
- Coordinates: 38°26′05″N 78°07′57″W
- Area: 280 acres (110 ha)
- Built: 1796
- NRHP reference No.: 01000691
- VLR No.: 056-5011

Significant dates
- Added to NRHP: July 13, 2001
- Designated VLR: March 14, 2001

James City Historic District is a national historic district located near Madison, Madison County, Virginia. The district encompasses 14 contributing buildings in the rural hamlet of James City. They consist of late-18th-, early-to-late 19th-, and early-20th century commercial, residential, and agricultural buildings. The commercial buildings include two stores, a tavern and a blacksmith shop.

It was listed on the National Register of Historic Places in 2001.
