= Dewey (deer) =

Cloned white-tailed deer

Dewey is the first cloned deer and was born on May 23, 2003. Specifically, he is a White-tailed Deer, or Odocoileus virginianus, and was cloned from a dead buck by the Texas A&M University College of Veterinary Medicine. As reported by Chron in 2013 for his 10th birthday, Dewey was living a "life of luxury" in the college.

A DNA analysis proved that he was genetically identical to the donor. He was cloned from tissue harvested from the skin cells of the hunted deer. Researchers at Texas A&M were studying his antler growth as well as possibly following his offspring to measure their antler growth.

== See also ==
- Bella (deer)
- Dillie
