= Bob Worsley =

American politician

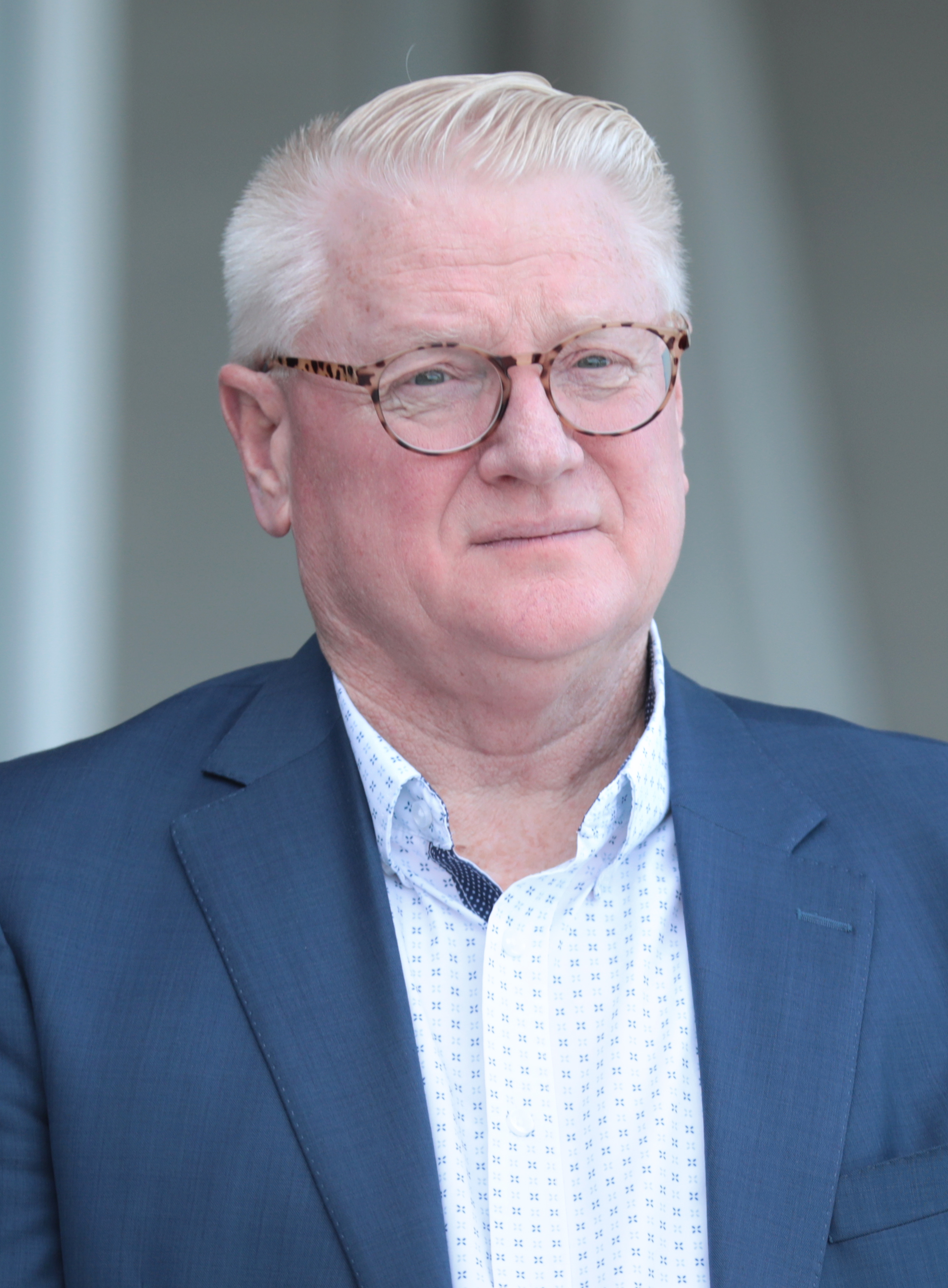
- Worsley in 2022

Member of the Arizona Senate from the 25th district
- In office January 14, 2013 – January 14, 2019
- Preceded by: Gail Griffin
- Succeeded by: Tyler Pace

Personal details
- Born: February 15, 1956 (age 70)
- Party: Republican
- Spouse: Christi Worsley 22 grandchildren
- Education: Brigham Young University
- Website: bobworsleyforsenate.com

Bob Worsley (born February 15, 1956) is an American businessman and politician. He is the founder of SkyMall and a former Republican member of the Arizona Senate representing District 25 from 2013 to 2019.

Worsley was a Certified Public Accountant (CPA) with PriceWaterhouse in the 1980s. In 1999, he received the "Entrepreneur of the Year" award from Ernst and Young. Worsley is the founder of NZ Legacy—a land, mineral and energy development company—which supplies electricity to over 27,000 homes in the white mountains. He is also the developer of a planned Potash facility in Holbrook, Arizona, that will create 500 permanent jobs.

Worsley was formerly on the Board of Directors for United Families International and for the Institute for American Values, and is currently on the Board of Directors for the Mesa branch of United Way. Furthermore, he is an International Advisory Council Member for the International Center for Law and Religion Studies. Worsley is also the Co-Founder of the Consolari Music Hall in Mesa, Arizona.

In 2020 Worsley wrote The Horseshoe Virus: How the Anti-Immigration Movement Spread from Left-Wing to Right-Wing America. His book dissects how current anti-immigrant sentiments have evolved out of the work of John Tanton, a staunch environmentalist and advocate for population control, who shifted his focus and founded organizations devoted to demonizing American immigrants.

== Education ==
Worsley earned his bachelor's degree in accounting from Brigham Young University.

== Political positions ==
Bob Worsley considers himself to have a "common sense approach to conservative leadership." After being elected, his willingness to reach across the aisle on some issues means that "the Mesa Republican has emerged this session as major force in the sharply-divided Arizona Senate as a critical swing vote...often bucking his party colleagues in hopes of finding a solution to some nagging problems." Worsley has a mostly conservative record, but has crossed party lines on some votes. He has been considered by some to be a moderate Republican relative to Arizona's politics. He has a 76% lifetime conservative score from the American Conservative Union. According to a study by the Arizona Center for Investigative Reporting, State Senator Worsley voted with a majority of the Arizona Senate's Democrats 52% of the time, but still voted more often with his own party.

=== Abortion ===
Worsley opposes abortion. He was endorsed in 2012 by Arizona Right to Life which is opposed to legal abortion. In 2016, Worsley was given a 0% rating by NARAL/Arizona Right to Choose and 20% by Planned Parenthood which support legal access to abortion.

=== Fiscal issues ===
On fiscal issues, Worsley has a conservative leaning. In 2016, he was given a 53% rating by Americans for Prosperity, a conservative PAC. However, the American Conservative Union gave him a significantly higher score in 2016 of 74%. He also received a 100% rating from the Arizona Small Business Association.

=== Education ===
He was one of four Republicans in the State Senate to vote against repealing Common Core standards. He also voted in favor of vouchers for private schools.

=== Guns ===
In 2016, Worsley received a 40% from the Arizona Citizens Defense League PAC, following a 2014 "A-" grade from the NRA Political Victory Fund which both lobby in favor of rights for gun ownership.

=== Healthcare ===
Worsley was one of 14 Republicans in the Arizona legislature to vote in favor of expanding Medicaid under the provisions of the Affordable Care Act. “I thought it was an economic no-brainer to take $10 billion over the next five years from the federal government,” he said after the vote. He has been given an 80% rating by the Arizona Hospital and Healthcare Association.

=== Immigration ===
Worsley supports a pathway to legal residency for undocumented immigrants. In 2012, he defeated anti-immigration Russell Pearce in the Republican primary. He was one of three Republicans who broke with their party joining Democrats to vote against a bill that would have required harsher sentences for undocumented immigrants in court.

=== LGBT issues ===
Worsley opposed to same-sex marriage and provided funds to the campaign to ban same-sex marriage in Arizona. He has received a 100% from the socially conservative Center for Arizona Policy, which opposes gay marriage and civil unions, and a 0% from Stonewall Democrats of Arizona, a partisan Democratic group which supports LGBT rights. He initially voted for a bill that would allow some business to refuse certain services to same-sex couples; however, Worsley then said he was uncomfortable with his vote, reversed his position, and petitioned then-Governor Jan Brewer to veto the bill which some considered discriminatory against gay and lesbian couples. Worsley signed a letter saying "As Arizona leaders, we feel it is important to loudly proclaim that we strongly condemn discrimination in any form."

Religion

Worsley along with his wife Christi are members of the Church of Jesus Christ of Latter-day Saints.

== Elections ==
- 2012 With Republican Senator Gail Griffin redistricted to District 14, Worsley won the District 25 August 28, 2012 Republican Primary with 17,200 votes (56%) against former Senator Russell Pearce; and won the three-way November 6, 2012 General election with 55,290 votes (66.6%) against Democratic nominee Greg Gadek.
- Worsley again won the District 25 August 26, 2014 Republican Primary with 15,473 votes (53%) against Ralph Heap; and won the November 4, 2014 General election with 38,505 votes (70%) against Democratic nominee Steven Zachary.
