= Woodbourne (Madison, Virginia) =

Historic house in Virginia, United States

- U.S. National Register of Historic Places
- Virginia Landmarks Register
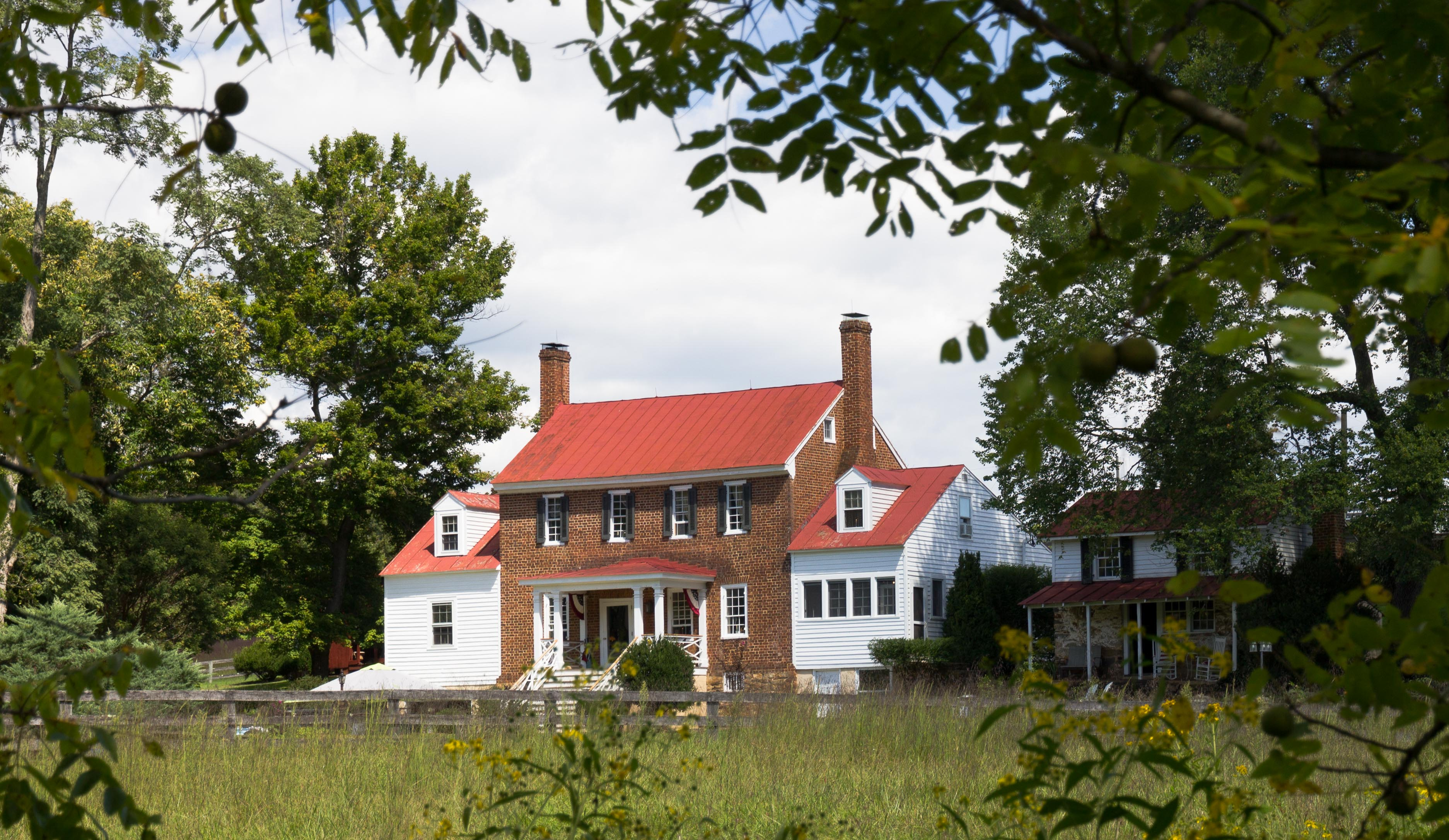

- Location within Virginia Location within the United States
- Location: VA 657, 1.5 miles W. of Jct. US Alt. 29 and VA 657, Madison, Virginia
- Coordinates: 38°22′49″N 78°16′40″W
- Area: 52.88 acres (21.40 ha)
- Built: c. 1805-1814
- NRHP reference No.: 99000727
- VLR No.: 056-0038

Significant dates
- Added to NRHP: June 28, 1999
- Designated VLR: June 17, 1998

Woodbourne is a historic home and farm located at Madison, Madison County, Virginia. The house was built between about 1805 and 1814, and is a two-story, gable-roofed brick structure. It has a front porch, a two-story frame wing attached to either gable end, and a one-story rear frame wing. Adjacent to the house is the two-story, old kitchen building. Also on the property are the contributing ruins of the foundation of the old barn.

It was listed on the National Register of Historic Places in 1999.
