= Frostburg State University =

Public university in Frostburg, Maryland, US

Coordinates: 39.650352°N 78.932530°W

- Former names: State Normal School No. 2 (1902–1935); State Teachers College at Frostburg (1935–1963); Frostburg State College (1963–1987)
- Motto: "One University. A World of Experiences."
- Type: Public university
- Established: 1898; 128 years ago
- Parent institution: University System of Maryland
- Endowment: US$26.4 million (2020)
- President: Shadow JQ Robinson
- Provost: Michael Mathias
- Faculty: 315 (2023)
- Students: 4,075 (Fall 2023)
- Undergraduates: 3,344 (Fall 2023)
- Postgraduates: 731 (Fall 2023)
- Location: Frostburg, Maryland, United States
- Campus: Rural, 260 acres (1.1 km^{2})
- Colors: Red, black, white
- Nickname: Bobcats
- Sporting affiliations: NCAA Division II - MEC
- Mascot: Bob Cat
- Website: frostburg.edu

Frostburg State University (FSU) is a public university in Frostburg, Maryland, United States. The university is the only four-year institution of the University System of Maryland west of the Baltimore-Washington passageway in the state's Appalachian Highlands. Founded in 1898 by Maryland State Senator John Leake, Frostburg was selected as the best suitable location without a cost to the state. Today, the institution is a largely residential university.

With an enrollment of about 4,858, the university offers 47 undergraduate majors, 16 graduate programs, and a doctorate in educational leadership. The university is accredited by the Middle States Commission on Higher Education and places primary emphasis on its role as a teaching and learning institution.

== History ==
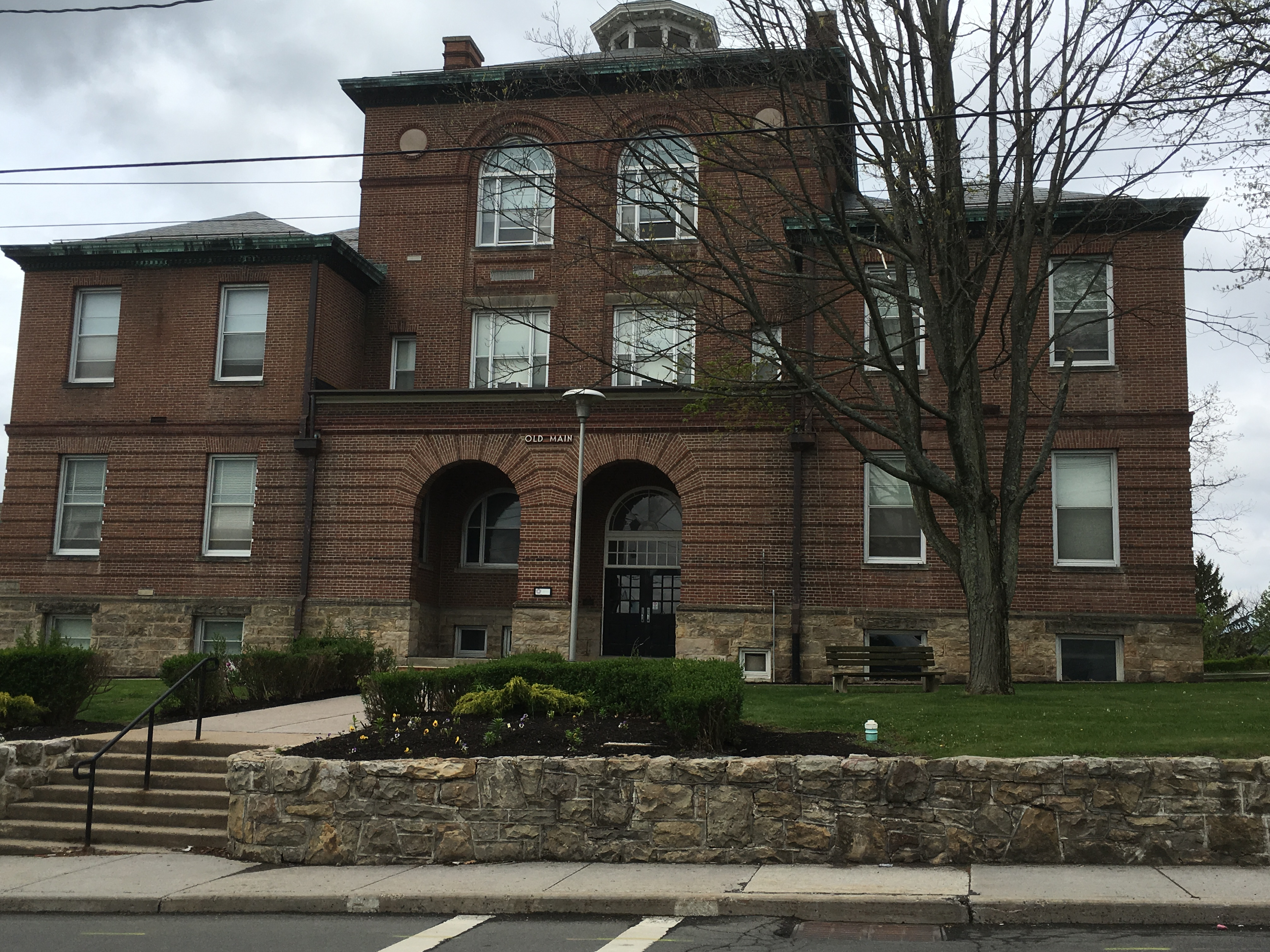
Old Main was the first building on campus in 1902.

What was "Frostburg State Normal School No. 2" was founded by an act of the Maryland General Assembly, House Bill 742, from the General Appropriation Bill, on March 31, 1898. The bill was offered on the floor by John Leake of Vale Summit in Allegany County:

For the direction of the erection of a building in Frostburg, Allegany County to be known as The State Normal School No. 2, for the sum of $20,000; and for the support of said school when established $5,000 annually, provided, the people of the town of Frostburg furnish the ground for the site of said building and deed the same to the state.

The State Board of Education selected and the town of Frostburg paid for the two-acre Beall Park as the school's location on August 9, 1898. The cornerstone was laid in a ceremony on September 4, 1899. The Normal School's first building, Old Main, was positioned in Beall Park to face Loo Street (now known as College Avenue) and to look down Wood Street toward downtown Frostburg.

State Normal School No. 2 held its first class on September 15, 1902, with 57 students. Frostburg's first administrator was Edward D. Murdaugh. In 1904, eight students became the first graduates of the college, receiving diplomas and lifetime teaching certificates. A new gymnasium was completed in 1914. In 1919, a dormitory opened. In 1925, a second dormitory opened. In 1927, Allegany Hall, a new auditorium, gymnasium, and heating plant was added. In 1930, a six-room practice elementary school known as the new laboratory school opened and the campus was extended to 40 acres, taking over the Brownsville area of Frostburg.

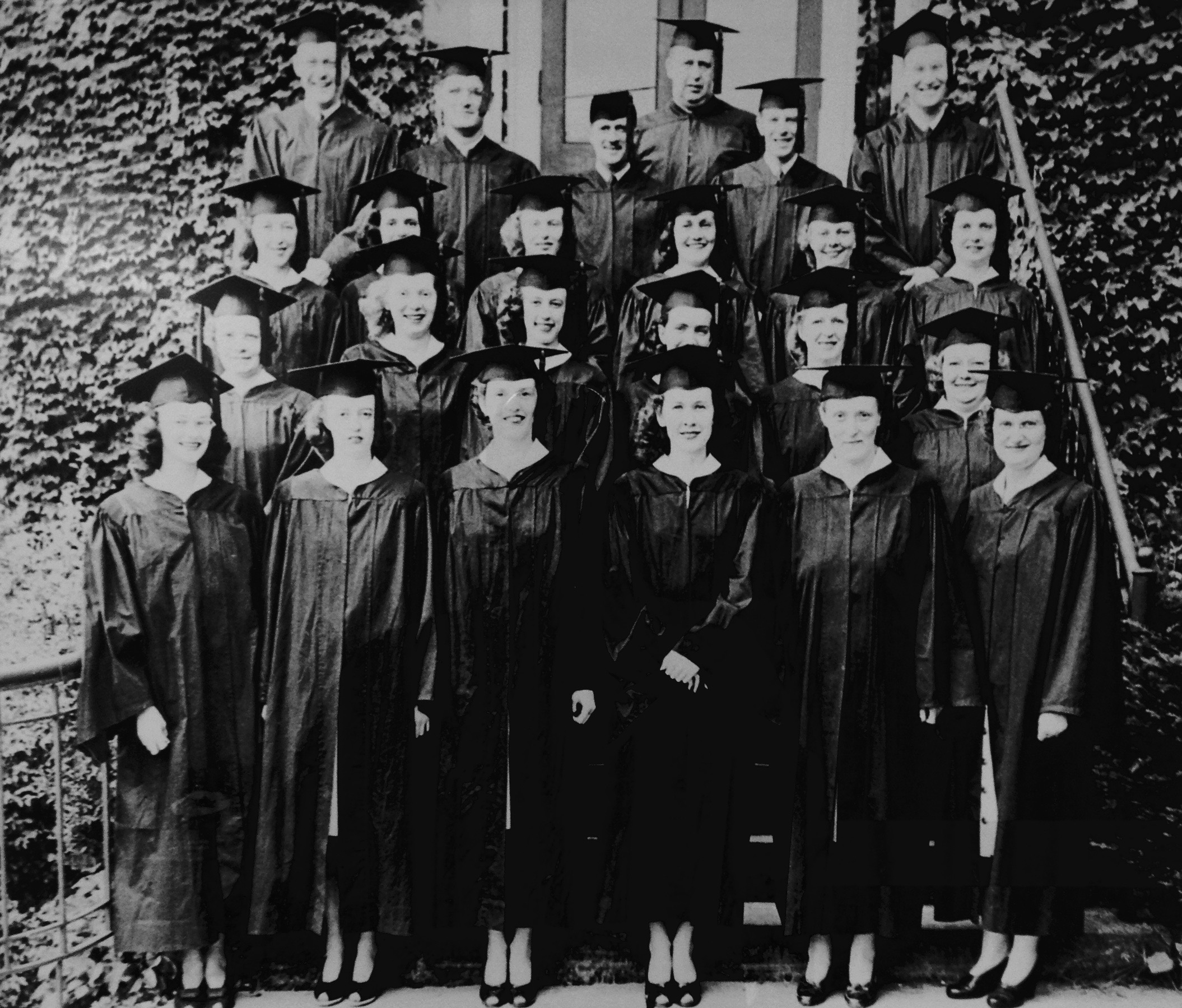
Frostburg State Teachers College (Class of 1946)

The institution's original mission was to train teachers for public school systems statewide. In 1935, the school was renamed "State Teachers' College at Frostburg" (or Frostburg State Teachers College) and began offering a four-year degree program leading to a Bachelor of Science in elementary education, after expanding the curriculum from two to three years in 1931 and 1934, respectively. Lillian Cleveland Compton served as president of the college from 1945 to 1954, succeeding John L. Dunkle, who served for 21 years. Her mission as president was essentially to prepare the college for its planned closing. Enrollment stood at a mere 62 students in 1945. With outdated facilities and inadequate funding, the college was accredited only by the State Department of Education. As early as 1943, a movement had arisen in the General Assembly to close the institution, which culminated in the Marbury Report.

The end of World War II brought a drastic change in the college's environment. In 1946, enrollment increased to 274 students, many admitted under the G.I. Bill. The movement to close the college persisted but seemed misguided to those on the scene and was roundly opposed by both private citizens and civic groups in Frostburg and Western Maryland. With the strong support of State Superintendent of Schools Thomas G. Pullen and Governor William Preston Lane Jr., the General Assembly was petitioned to keep the School open and the Marbury Commission's recommendations died without being enacted. In 1947, the American Council on Education suggested that Frostburg State Teachers College be closed. Its report stated:

Your Commission does feel obligated to recommend the prompt discontinuance of the State Teachers College at Frostburg. We are convinced that the cost of operating this unit is not justified by the very small number of its graduates who are entering the school system of the state as teachers. In reaching this conclusion, we have been strongly influenced by the report of our survey staff as to the present condition of the physical facilities at Frostburg. It is apparent that the state faces a heavy capital expenditure if operations at that location are to be continued. Frankly, such an outlay seems to us to be an indefensible waste of public money ... The facilities in Towson are adequate to care for all the students at Frostburg who are now studying to become teachers.

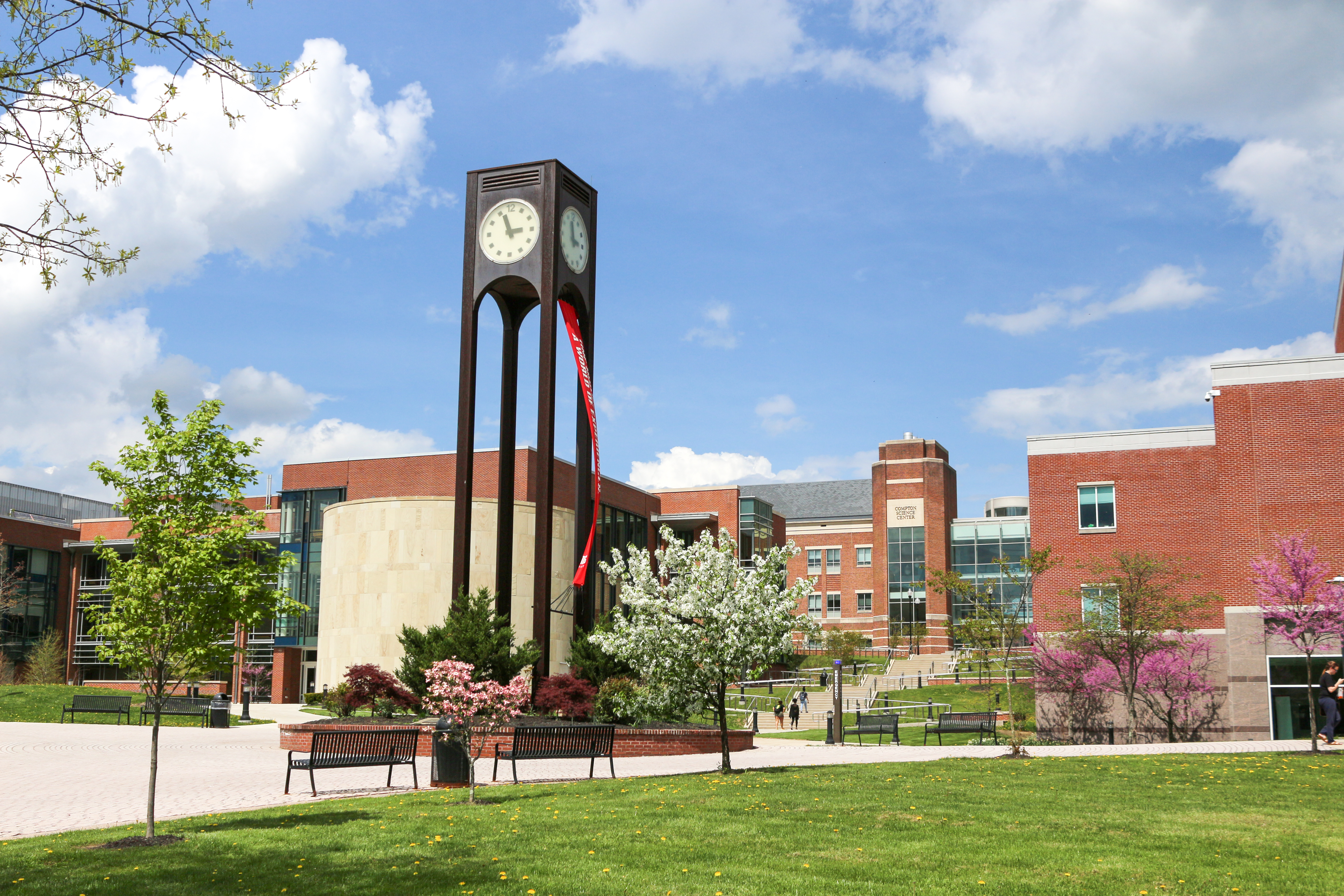
The lower quad of Frostburg State University in spring featuring the Clock Tower with CCIT and Compton Science Center in the background.

Under Compton's leadership, the institution celebrated its 50th anniversary in the 1949–50 academic year, enrollment grew from 62 students in 1945 to 500 in 1954, the faculty increased from 13 to 34 members, and the campus grew from eight to 40 acres. In addition to plant expansion, she initiated programs in curriculum development, adding a program to train junior high school teachers. R. Bowen Hardesty replaced Compton as president in 1955.

The college's continued southern expansion caused the Brownsville Schools and homes along Park Avenue to be demolished by 1955 to make way for Compton, Allen, and Simpson Halls. A new school—also known as the Lincoln School, and the current home of the university's Public Safety office—was built in the late 1950s, but used for only two years until national integration laws reassigned students to other Frostburg elementary schools. Marking a shift in the educational mission of the institution, the college was given the right to grant Bachelor of Arts degrees and the master of education degree in 1960. The school was again renamed in July 1963, this time as Frostburg State College. Frostburg received university status in July 1987 and was renamed Frostburg State University. The institution opened a campus in Hagerstown in 1988, which became the University System of Maryland at Hagerstown in 2005, and offered its first doctoral degree in 2012.

In 2024, the university faced a $7.7 million deficit. University leaders planned to cut about 30 faculty positions by fall 2025 and another 15 by spring 2026. Frostburg also plans to reorganize its administration (including eliminating two vice presidents) to save $1.7 million in fiscal 2025 and beyond, reduce athletics spending to save $883,000, and make cuts to operations to save up to another $1 million.

== Academics ==
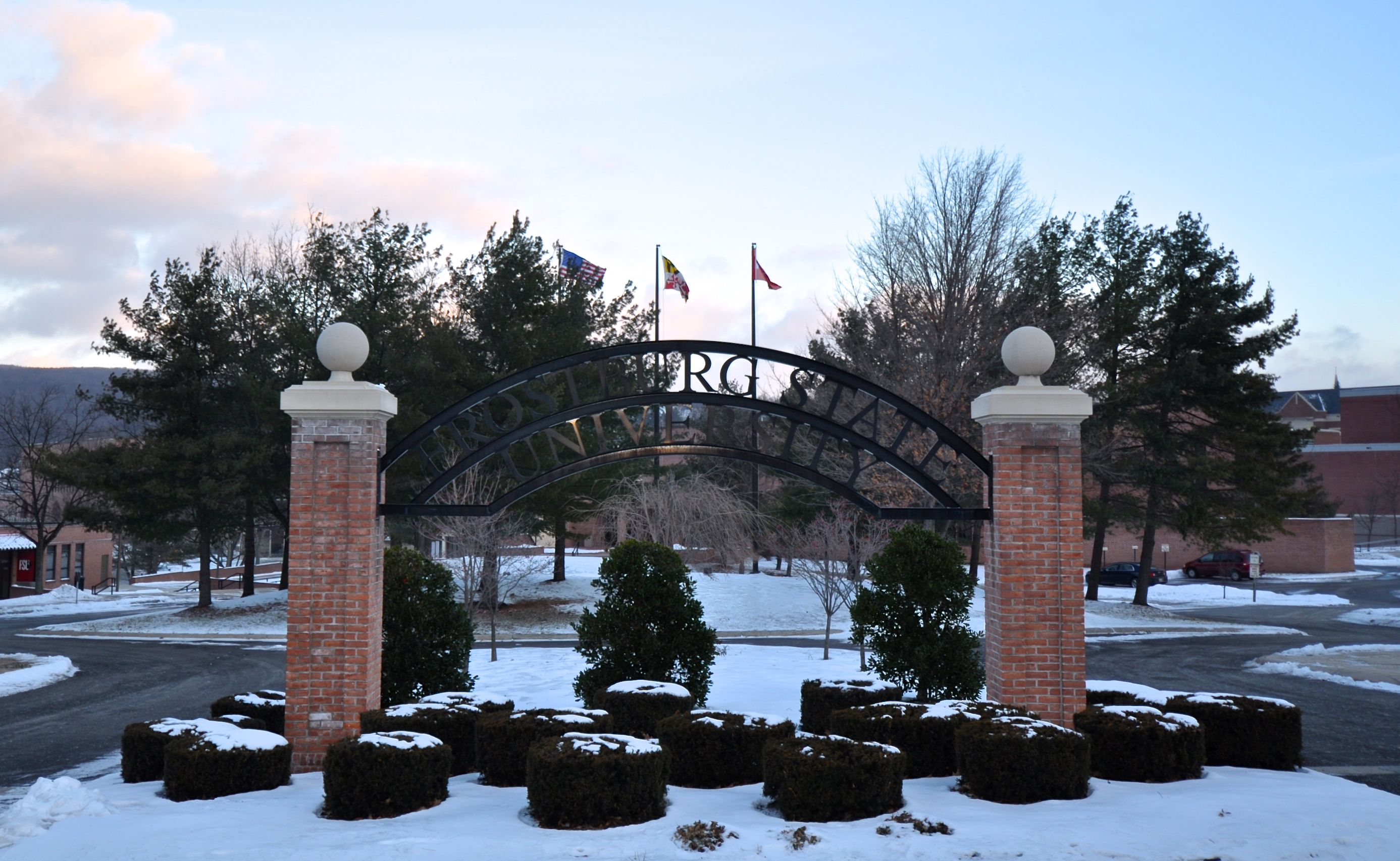
Frostburg State University entrance arch

Frostburg State University offers 47 undergraduate degrees, 80 specialized programs of study, and 16 graduate degrees in its three colleges:

- College of Business
- College of Education
- College of Liberal Arts and Sciences

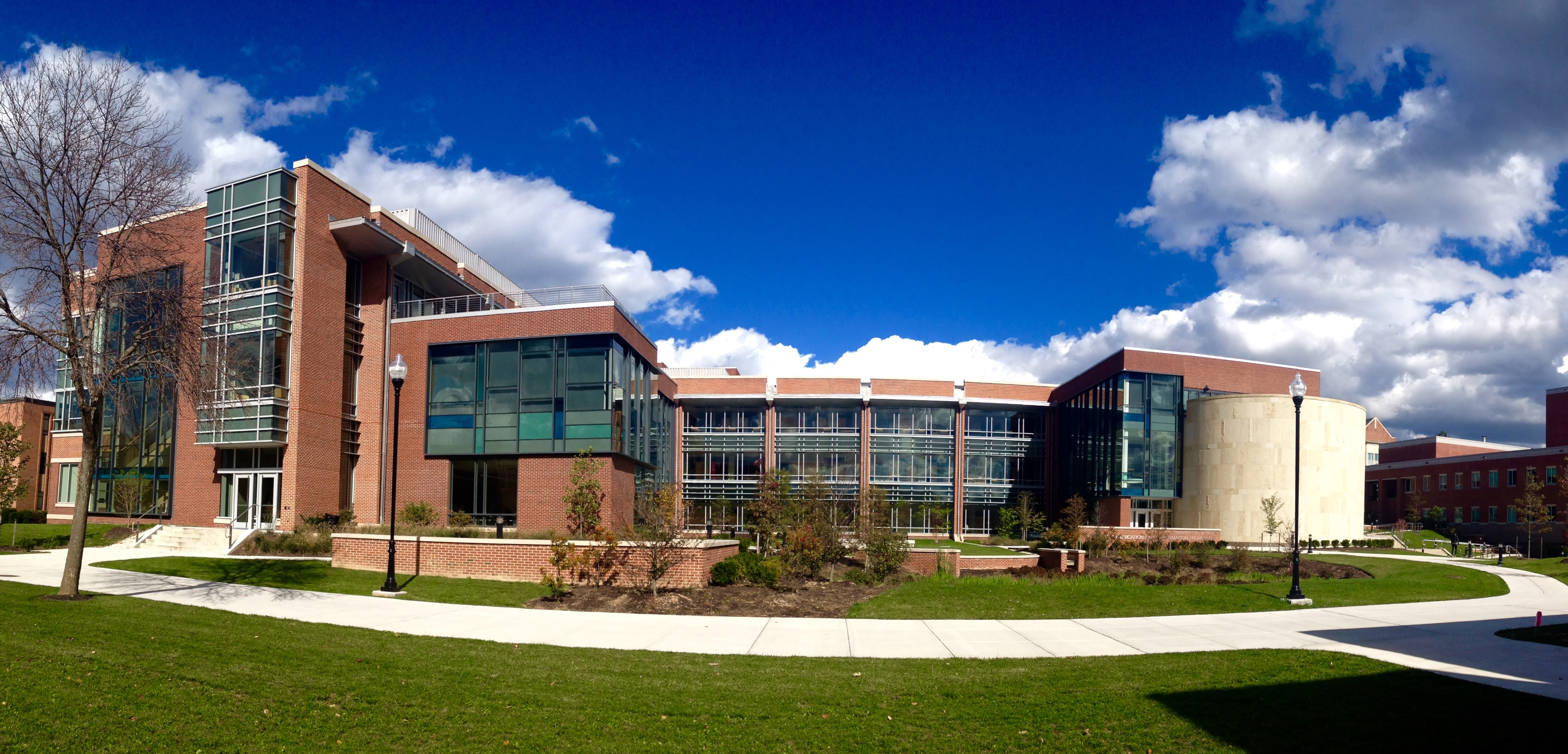
Frostburg State University's Center for Communications and Information Technology

Frostburg State University is accredited by the Middle States Commission on Higher Education. The College of Business holds accreditations from the (AACSB) Association to Advance Collegiate Schools of Business. The College of Education, specified with respective degree programs, holds accreditations from (NCATE) National Council for Accreditation of Teacher Education, (CAAHEP) Commission on Accreditation of Allied Health Education Programs respectively, (CAATE) Commission on Accreditation of Athletic Training Education, and The Council on Accreditation of Parks, Recreation, Tourism and Related Professions (COAPRT). The Counseling Psychology Master's program is accredited by the Masters in Psychology and Counseling Accreditation Council (MPCAC), and allows students to become Licensed Counselors.

Frostburg also incorporates for students, the ability to study 140 locations worldwide. Exchange programs and partnerships has included Mary Immaculate College Exchange Program (Ireland), Beijing Normal University in Beijing (China), ESC Rennes School of Business (France), Nagasaki University Exchange Program (Japan), Baden-Wurttemberg Cooperative State University Exchange Program (Germany), Kyung Hee University Exchange Program (Korea).

=== Unique programs ===
The adventure sports concentration is offered as a collaborative program with Garrett College. Ethnobotany, introduced in 2007, is one of only two of programs in the United States on the cultural use of plants. The program emphasizes experiential learning and practical experiences.

== Athletics ==
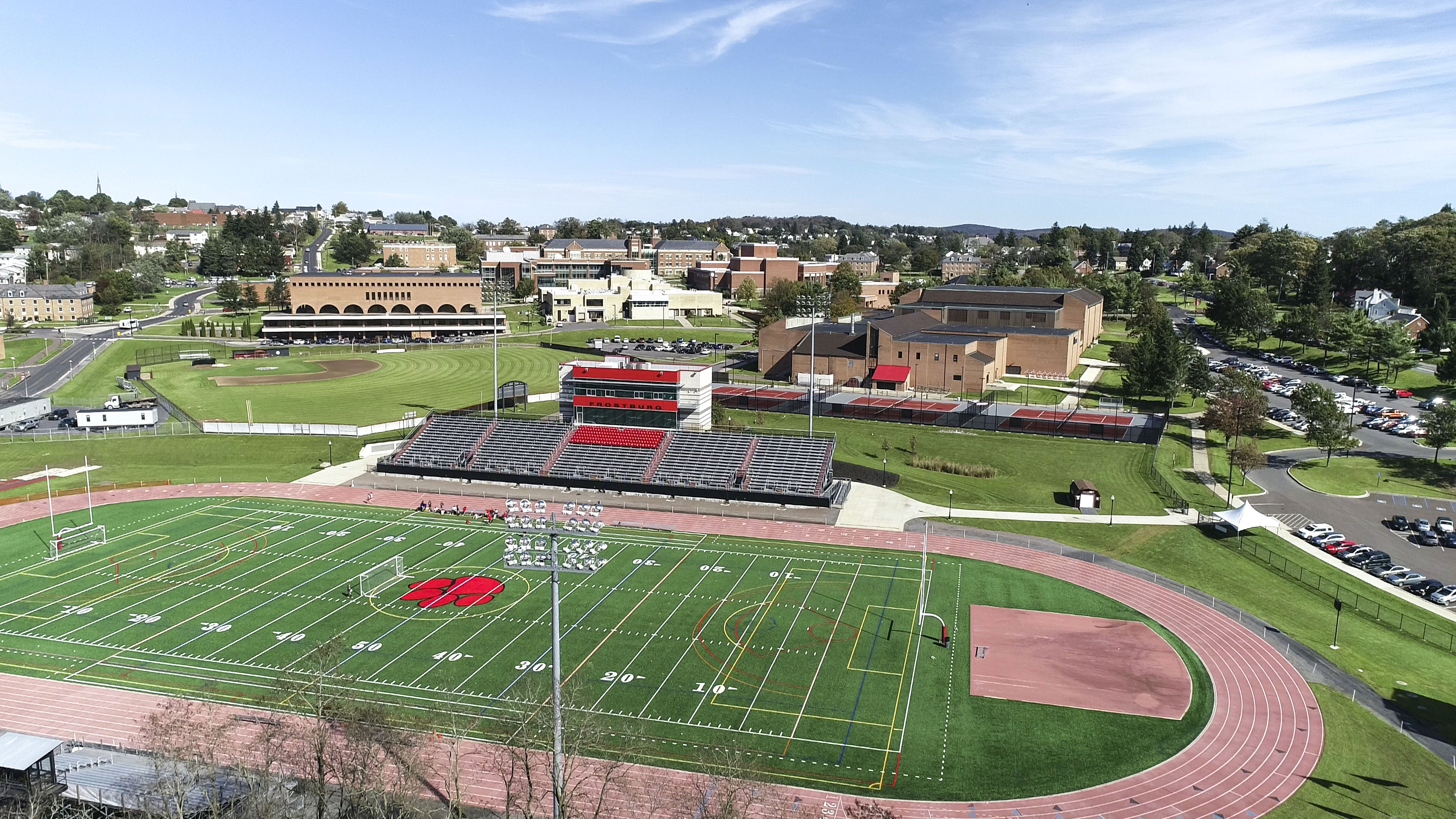
Aerial photo of the Frostburg State University stadium complex, including Bobcat stadium, baseball field, tennis courts and the Harold J. Cordts Physical Education Center.

On July 5, 2018, the Mountain East Conference announced that Frostburg State University has accepted an offer of membership beginning with the 2019–20 academic year. Full membership will be contingent upon Frostburg State achieving active membership status in NCAA Division II. Beginning in 2020, Frostburg joined the East Coast Conference as an associate member in men's lacrosse, also contingent on being accepted into Division II by the NCAA.

Until 2019, Frostburg State University competed at the NCAA Division III level and was a member of the Capital Athletic Conference, as well as participating as an associate member of the New Jersey Athletic Conference for football. Before 2010, FSU competed as a member of the Allegheny Mountain Collegiate Conference. FSU's football team was a member of the ACFC, but moved to Empire 8 in 2011. FSU teams have participated in and won many championships, Baseball having the most championship victories. Various club and intramural sports are available on campus.

== Student life ==
Undergraduate demographics as of Fall 2023
Race and ethnicity	Total
White	59%
Black	24%
Hispanic	7%
Two or more races	5%
International student	2%
Asian	1%
Unknown	1%
Economic diversity
Low-income (Note: The percentage of students who received an income-based federal Pell grant intended for low-income students.)	38%
Affluent (Note: The percentage of students who are a part of the American middle class at the bare minimum.)	62%

FSU-TV3 is Frostburg State University's 24-hour educational access channel. WFWM radio is operated by FSU.

Frostburg State University has a large number of nationally and internationally recognized fraternities, sororities, academic clubs, and student associations on-campus.

== Presidents ==
President	Tenure
Edward D. Murdaugh	1902–1909
Reginald H. Ridgely	1909–1912
Edward F. Webb	1909–1916
C. L. Staple	1916–1917
Patrick O'Rourke	1918
James Widdowson	1918–1923
John L. Dunkle	1924–1945
Lillian Cleveland Compton	1945–1954
R. Bowen Hardesty	1955–1964
John H. Morey	1965–1969
Nelson P. Guild	1969–1985
Herbert F. Reinhard Jr.	1986–1991
Catherine R. Gira	1991–2006
Jonathan C. Gibralter	2006–2015
Ronald H. Nowaczyk	2016–2025
Shadow JQ Robinson	2026-Present

== Notable faculty ==
- Brad Barkley, author
- Andy Duncan, science-fiction writer

== Notable alumni ==
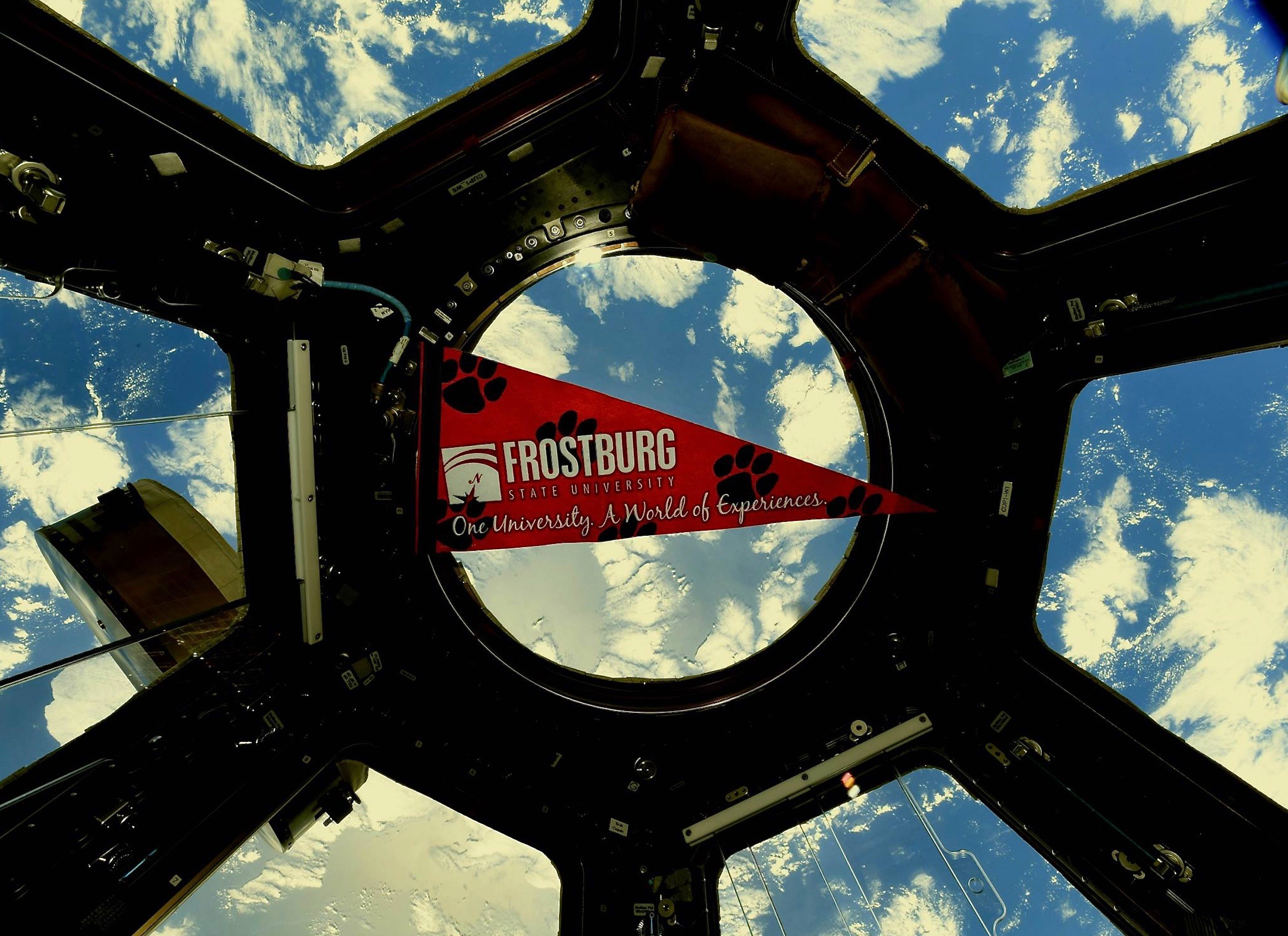
Image of Earth and a Frostburg State University pennant taken from the International Space Station by FSU Alumni and NASA Astronaut Richard Arnold.

- Kristine Vetulani-Belfoure (1962), Nazi concentration camps survivor, author, and teacher
- James A. Graham (1963), USMC, Medal of Honor recipient
- Henry B. Heller (1964), Democrat, member of Maryland House of Delegates
- Donald P. Hutchinson (1967), Baltimore County Executive, 1978–86; member of Maryland House of Delegates, 1967–74; and State Senate, 1975–78.
- John N. Bambacus (1970), former Maryland state senator, former mayor of Frostburg
- James Wolcott (1972), author and critic; did not graduate
- Jack Blessing (1972), film and television actor
- Debra Monk (1973), Tony and Emmy award-winning actress
- Bob Maddox (1973), NFL player
- John Ellinger (1973), American soccer coach, formerly of the Under 17 United States men's national soccer team and Real Salt Lake of Major League Soccer
- Jim Riggleman (1974), professional baseball manager
- Kevin Kelly (1975), member of Maryland House of Delegates
- Richard Robert "Ricky" Arnold II (1985), NASA astronaut, selected in 2004 as an Educator Mission Specialist
- Gary Howell (1990), Republican, member of West Virginia House of Delegates
- Robert A. McKee (1991), former member of the Maryland House of Delegates
- Gregory Thomas Garcia (1992), Emmy-winning writer and TV producer, has referenced Frostburg State University in episodes of Yes, Dear, My Name Is Earl, and Raising Hope
- Mike Longabardi (1996), professional basketball coach
