= Old Main (Frostburg State University) =

Coordinates: 39°39′09″N 78°55′46″W

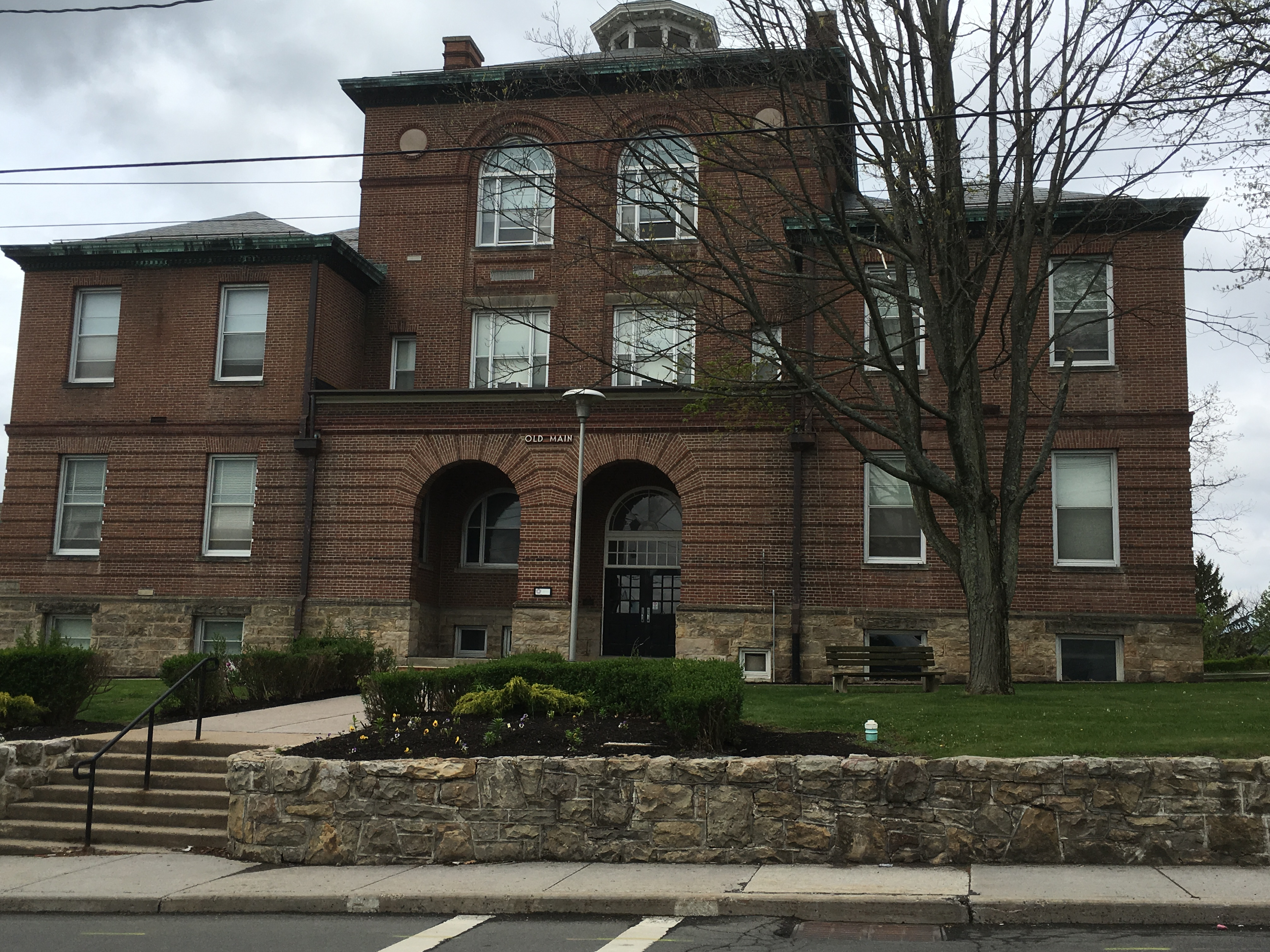
Old Main

Old Main is located at the northeast end of Frostburg State University campus, at 101 Braddock Rd. in Frostburg, Allegany County, Maryland. The style of the building is in Renaissance Revival interpreted in brick. The building is 17,845 sq ft.

The inside consists of classrooms and office spaces which are currently being used by the College of Business.

== History ==
Frostburg State University itself was established in 1899 as State Normal School No. 2 by an act of the General Assembly under Governor Lloyd Lowndes.^{1} Old Main was the first building for which the cornerstone was laid on September 4, 1899 by the mayor of Frostburg, Joseph Bear. The college opened to the public on September 15, 1902 and graduated its first class of 8 in 1904. Old Main was the only building existing at this time. The school and therefore building was made possible by lobbying efforts by Benson Oder, who at the time was the editor and publisher of the Frostburg Mining Journal.^{1} When originally constructed the state of Maryland appropriated $20,000 for its construction.^{1} It also allotted for $5,000 annually for its maintenance.

Originally Old Main was used to instruct students in teaching at the elementary level which was a two year program.^{1} In 1931 the Maryland General Assembly passed an act requiring a three year program for students. This extended the time students used Old Main and in 1934 the school changed to a 4 year college known as Frostburg State Teachers College.^{1} From this point on students taking classes in Old Main would earn a Bachelor of Science in Elementary Education.

== Remodeling ==
Prior In 1913 the first gymnasium was opened in Old Main.^{1}In the 1920s a library was added to the third floor of the building. Later renovations connected Old Main to Faculty Hall, now known as Guild, by a one story brick hyphen.^{1} It was also connected to Frost Hall by a wooden corridor both of which were removed prior to its remodel in 1980.

== Haunting ==
Strange noises and events have been reported for several years in Old Main by students. With an uprising in youth suicide rates, rumors and legends of a past student, who may or may not have actually existed, committing suicide on campus or in the building began spreading. There are currently at least whispers of the haunting of Old Main, but these for the most part tend to range from playful curiosity to being regarded as a fictitious urban legend. The building was examined by Ross Allison, a founding member of Advanced Ghost Hunters of Seattle Tacoma, who believed something paranormal was involved. It is unknown if any students had in fact ended their own lives in Old Main or if there are currently any experiences ongoing in the building, but the urban legend of the haunting of Old Main has persisted for many years and is still discussed occasionally.

== Future plans ==
There are occasionally talks and rumors of renovating or tearing down Old Main, but there are currently no concrete plans for the building aside from a proposed instate of historical status for the property.
