= The Homeplace =

Historic house in Virginia, United States

- U.S. National Register of Historic Places
- Virginia Landmarks Register
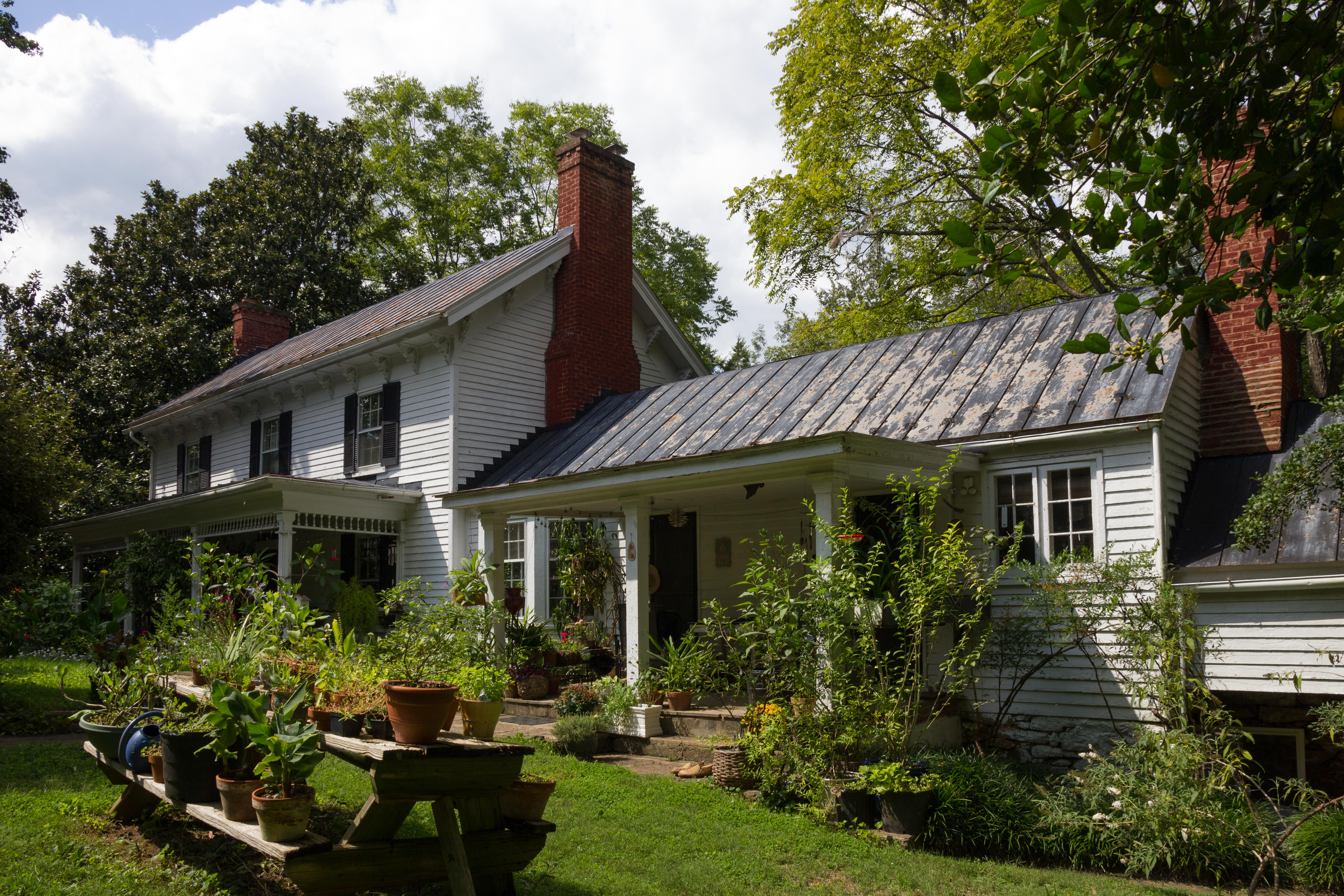

- Location within Virginia Location within the United States
- Location: US 29, jct. with VA 603, Madison, Virginia
- Coordinates: 38°24′11″N 78°13′20″W
- Area: 5.6 acres (2.3 ha)
- Built: c. 1830, c. 1875
- Built by: Clore, James O.; Clore, James Cleveland
- Architectural style: I-house
- NRHP reference No.: 99000959
- VLR No.: 056-5008

Significant dates
- Added to NRHP: August 5, 1999
- Designated VLR: June 16, 1999

The Homeplace is a historic home and farm complex located at Madison, Madison County, Virginia. The original house was built about 1830, and is a gable-roofed hall-and- parlor building with a rear shed addition, built of frame over a stone basement. It was extensively enlarged about 1875 by the addition of a two-story wing built on an I-house plan. Also on the property are the contributing barn, well house, sun pit (greenhouse), bunkhouse for farm workers, meathouse, and a building which once housed the furniture factory operated by the Clore family.

It was listed on the National Register of Historic Places in 1999.
