= Dinwiddie High School =

Public high school in Virginia, US

Coordinates: 37°6′42.8″N 77°35′16.1″W

Dinwiddie County High School
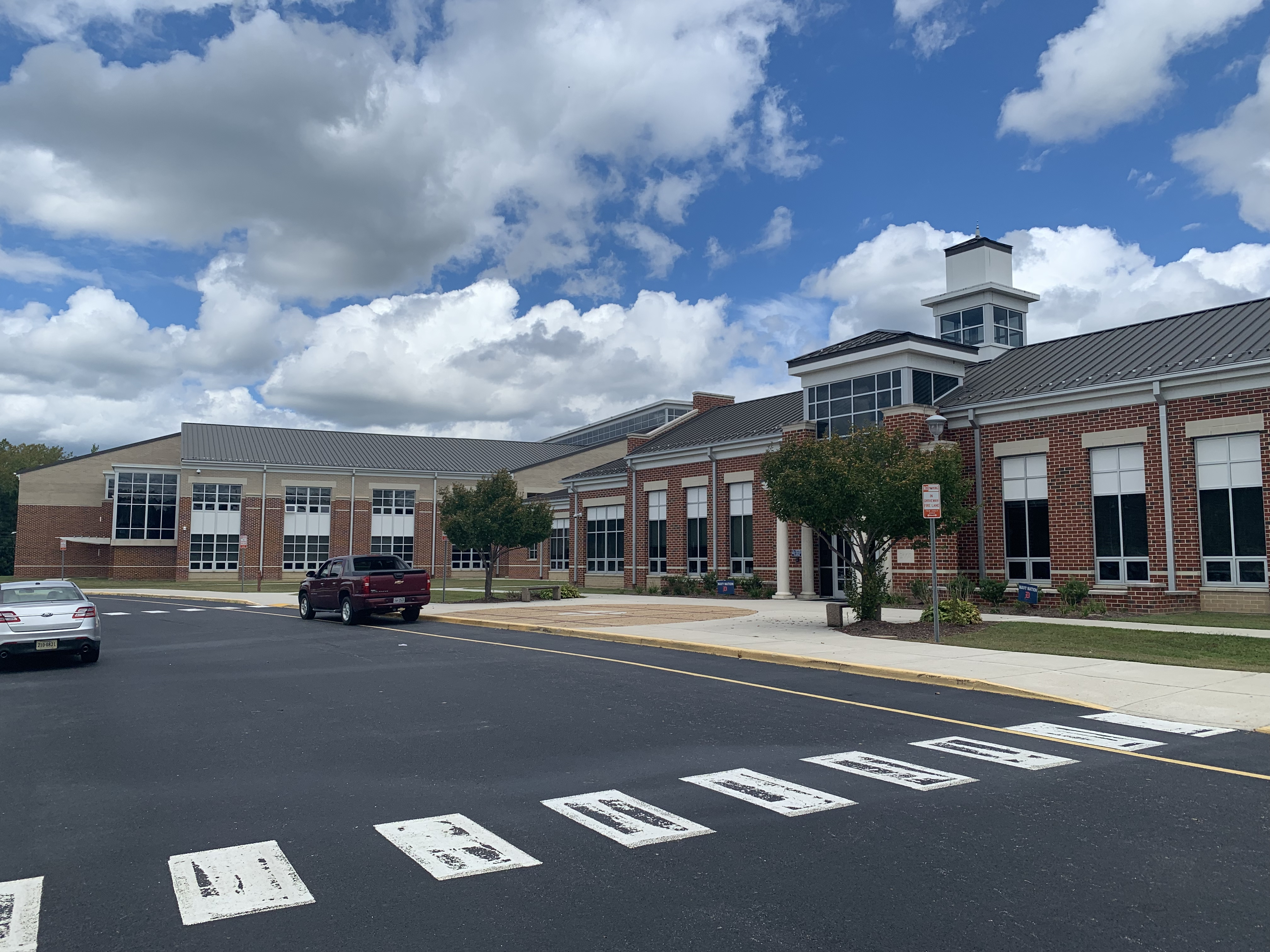
- Main entrance, 2022
- 11501 Boisseau Road; Dinwiddie, Virginia; United States

Information
- Type: Public
- Motto: "Navy Nation" or "Bleed Navy"
- Established: 2008 (current location)
- School district: Dinwiddie County Public Schools
- Principal: Robbie Garnes
- Grades: 9 to 12
- Enrollment: 1,322 (2018–2019)
- Campus size: 68 acres (28 ha)
- Colors: Red, White and Navy
- Athletics conference: 4A
- Sports: Football, Cross Country, Golf, Volleyball, Cheerleading, Wrestling, Track and Field, Basketball, Baseball, Softball, Tennis, and Soccer
- Mascot: The General
- Nickname: The Gens Navy Nation
- Rival: Prince George High School, Petersburg High School, Thomas Dale High School, Hopewell High School, Meadowbrook High School, Colonial Heights High School, and Matoaca High School
- Also called: Dinwiddie County High School
- Website: DHS Official site

Dinwiddie High School is a secondary school in Dinwiddie County, Virginia, United States. It is the only high school in the county.

== History ==
The Mann Act in 1906 provided for a system of high schools across the state. High schools were eventually built for white students in the county at Midway (1911 – 1965), Sunnyside (1912 – 1930), Dinwiddie (1913 – 1965), Darvills (1914 – 1942), McKenney (1916 – 1930). These were all consolidated into Dinwiddie County High School in 1965.

== Campus ==
In 2008, Dinwiddie High School moved to a new building located on a 68-acre (28 ha) campus across the street from its former building. The new school building serves students in grades 9 through 12 with a capacity of 1,600. The move is intended to ease overcrowding and accommodate future population growth in the region. The former high school building is now Dinwiddie Middle School for grades 6 through 8. Both schools are nicknamed the Generals, or the Gens. Although the two schools are separate, many authorities have confirmed the actual closeness of the students in the junior and senior high schools. Therefore, this makes it impossible to split the two schools. The campuses' close proximity allow for the sharing of amenities such as the football field. Dinwiddie High School has started to bring many new cool features to the campus as well. They have remodeled the flowerbeds around the school adding new mulch and colorful flowers. In the 2018–19 school year, the school decided to try a new form of class called a "Gen Block". This will give students about an hour of time to themselves of something they want to do such as coloring, cooking, sewing, and other extracurricular activities that they would like to do. "Gen Block" allows the student some free time halfway through the day, giving them a sense of relief about not having to worry about grades but just to have fun.

== Athletics ==
Attended the 2000 Virginia State Football Championship at University of Richmond Stadium against Heritage Newport News, losing 42-7.

Attended the 2008 Virginia State Football Championship at Lane Stadium against the Phoebus High School Phantoms, losing 37-13.

Attended the 2013 Virginia State Football Championship at Williams Stadium against the Sherando High School Warriors, winning 56-14.

Attended the 2016 Virginia State Football Championship at Zable Stadium against the Salem High School Spartans, losing 31-27.

== Notable alumni ==
- Jim Austin, Former MLB player (Milwaukee Brewers)
- Mike Christopher, Former MLB player (Los Angeles Dodgers, Cleveland Indians, Detroit Tigers)
- Curtis Wilkerson, Former MLB player (Texas Rangers, Chicago Cubs, Pittsburgh Pirates, Kansas City Royals)

== Notable faculty ==
- Thomas G. Pullen, former president University of Baltimore
