= Plow & Hearth =

American retail company

- Company type: Subsidiary
- Industry: Retail
- Founded: 1980 Madison, Virginia
- Headquarters: Madison, Virginia
- Number of employees: 400+
- Website: http://www.plowhearth.com/

Plow & Hearth is a United States retailer based in Madison, Virginia, specializing in hearth and fireplace accessories, furniture and home furnishings, and lawn and garden accessories. The company was established in 1980. Its headquarters is on a 38-acre (150,000 m^{2}) site in Madison, Virginia.

== History ==
The company was established by Peter and Peggy Rice and Michael Burns in 1980. It launched its first catalog in 1982. In 1998, they sold a majority interest in the company to 1-800-FLOWERS, and the company became a wholly owned subsidiary. The company continues to operate independently out of Madison, Virginia, with additional warehouse facilities in Vandalia, Ohio.

In May 2016, Plow & Hearth acquired the children's catalog company Children's Wear Digest Inc. CWD Kids was founded in 1987 in Richmond, VA. The business grew out of a chain of children's clothing stores called Small People, founded in 1979, which evolved from the Richmond Dry Goods Co., founded in 1911.
