= Zoombak =

American GPS tracking company

Zoombak Inc
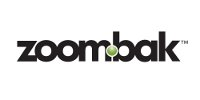
- Founded: 2006
- Defunct: 2011
- Headquarters: New York City, NY
- Products: GPS tracking devices
- Website: www.brickhousesecurity.com/category/gps+tracking.do

Zoombak Inc was a U.S.-based company which developed GPS tracking devices for people and items. It used satellite-enabled GPS and a location network server for tracking. In 2011, Securus, Inc. acquired Zoombak, LLC from TruePosition, Inc., a subsidiary of Liberty Media.

In March 2015 it was announced that BrickHouse Security acquired Securus, including Zoombak and related brands.
