= Madison County Courthouse (Tennessee) =

- U.S. National Register of Historic Places
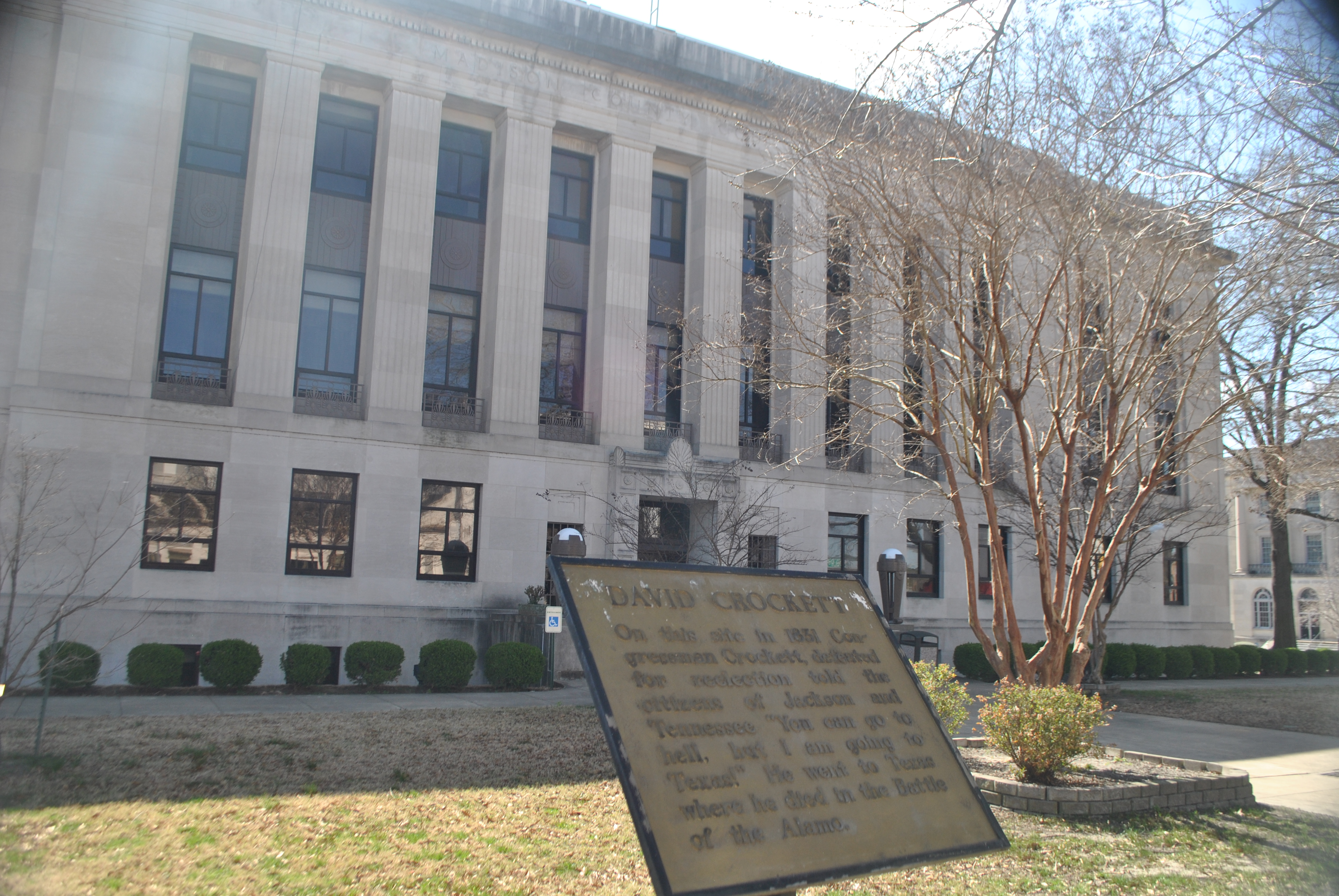

- Location within Tennessee Location within the United States
- Interactive map showing the location of Madison County Courthouse
- Location: Public Sq., Jackson, Tennessee
- Coordinates: 35°36′49″N 88°49′10″W
- Area: 1.4 acres (0.57 ha)
- Built: 1937
- Built by: Foster and Creighton
- Architect: Thomas Marr, Joseph Holman
- Architectural style: Public Works Administratio Moderne
- MPS: Historic County Courthouses of Tennessee MPS
- NRHP reference No.: 95000342
- Added to NRHP: March 30, 1995

The Madison County Courthouse in Jackson, Tennessee is a historic Public Works Administratio Moderne-style courthouse built in 1937. It was listed on the National Register of Historic Places in 1995.

The listing included three contributing objects.
