= Community Bank, N.A. =

Bank

- Type: Corporation, Subsidiary
- Traded as: NYSE: CBU; S&P 600 component
- Industry: Banking
- Founded: 1866
- Headquarters: DeWitt, New York, U.S.
- Number of locations: 207 customer facilities (2025)
- Area served: Upstate New York and Northeastern Pennsylvania
- Key people: Dimitar Karaivanov (CEO)
- Website: cbna.com

Community Bank, N.A. (CBNA) is a commercial bank in the United States serving customers in Upstate New York, Northeastern Pennsylvania, Lehigh Valley, Vermont and Massachusetts. It is the wholly owned national banking subsidiary of Community Financial System, Inc. (CFSI). Community Bank is headquartered in DeWitt, New York, a suburb of Syracuse.

== History ==
Community Bank, N.A. is the wholly owned national banking subsidiary of Community Bank System, Inc. (CBSI), whose predecessor bank was the St. Lawrence National Bank, chartered in 1866. In 1983, CBSI was incorporated in Delaware and became a registered bank holding company. CBSI maintains its headquarters in DeWitt, New York and is a full-service financial institution, offering complete consumer, business, and financial services.

Regional administrative locations of the bank are located in Canton and Olean, New York, and Wilkes-Barre, Pennsylvania and these offices share operational responsibility for customer facilities and ATMs throughout Northern New York, the Finger Lakes Region, the Southern Tier, Southwestern New York, and Northeastern Pennsylvania. In a recent acquisition, Community Bank N.A. gained Vermont and Massachusetts branches.

Other subsidiaries within the CBSI family are Nottingham Advisors, Inc., an investment management firm based in Buffalo, New York; CBNA Insurance Agency, Inc., a full-service property and casualty insurer; Benefit Plans Administrative Services, LLC, a pension administration and consulting firm located in Utica, New York, serving sponsors of defined benefit and defined contribution plans; Harbridge Consulting Group, LLC, an actuarial pension and consulting business located in Syracuse, New York; and Hand Securities, Inc., a broker/dealer delivering financial products and long-term health and other insurance products from selected locations within Community Bank's branch system.
