= WFWM =

Frostburg, Maryland; United States
- Broadcast area: Frostburg, Maryland; Cumberland, Maryland
- Frequency: 91.9 MHz

Programming
- Format: Public radio
- Affiliations: National Public Radio

Ownership
- Owner: Frostburg State University

History
- Former call signs: WGTK (1984–1984)

Technical information
- Licensing authority: FCC
- Facility ID: 22791
- Class: B1
- ERP: 1,300 watts
- HAAT: 434 meters (1,424 ft)
- Transmitter coordinates: 39°34′54.00″N 78°53′53.00″W

Links
- Public license information: Public file; LMS
- Website: wfwm.org

WFWM is a public broadcast radio station headquartered at the campus of Frostburg State University inside the Gira Center for Communications and Information Technology (also known as the Gira Center or CCIT) on Braddock Road. WFWM provides 24 hours of cultural and educational programming to the westernmost area of Maryland and adjacent areas of West Virginia and Pennsylvania. WFWM's main transmitter is located on Dans Mountain in Midland, Maryland and operates at a frequency of 91.9 MHz. A secondary transmitter is located in Oakland, Maryland and operates at a frequency of 96.3 MHz.

Some of WFWM's daily programming includes: locally produced programming and news as well as the public syndicate network of National Public Radio (NPR), the Associated Press, and National Weather Service. WFWM's musical programming includes: Classical, Jazz, Big Band, Blues, Celtic, Bluegrass, World, and Alternative, but most of its time is devoted to NPR and PRI news and talk programming and classical music. To provide experiential learning opportunities in radio operations for students, WFWM also hosts a student-run station called XFSR, Frostburg Student Radio. XFSR is an intranet radio station only broadcasting over the Frostburg State University network and not on the internet.

== History ==
The station went on the air as WGTK on 1984-05-17. On 1984-06-19, the station changed its call sign to the current WFWM.

== Translators ==
In addition to the main station, WFWM is relayed by an additional translator to widen its broadcast area.

Call sign	Frequency	City of license	FID	ERP (W)	Class	FCC info
W242AD	96.3 FM	Oakland, Maryland	22792	100	D	LMS

== See also ==
- Campus radio
- List of college radio stations in the United States
