= Madison, Virginia =

- Town
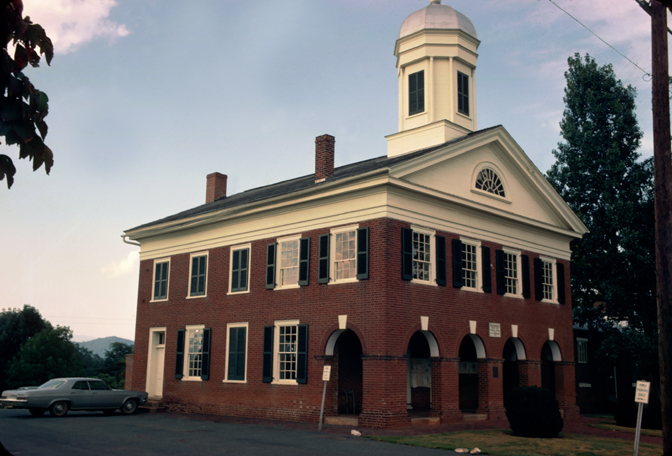
- Madison County Courthouse (built 1829)

- Location in Madison County and the state of Virginia.
- Coordinates: 38°22′51″N 78°15′29″W
- Country: United States
- State: Virginia
- County: Madison

Area
  - Total: 0.24 sq mi (0.61 km^{2})
  - Land: 0.24 sq mi (0.61 km^{2})
  - Water: 0 sq mi (0.00 km^{2})
- Elevation: 604 ft (184 m)

Population (2020)
  - Total: 205
  - Density: 869/sq mi (335.4/km^{2})
- Time zone: UTC−5 (Eastern (EST))
  - Summer (DST): UTC−4 (EDT)
- ZIP codes: 22719, 22727
- Area code: 540
- FIPS code: 51-48488
- GNIS feature ID: 1498511
- Website: www.townofmadisonva.com

Madison is a town in and the county seat of Madison County, Virginia, United States. The population was 205 at the 2020 census.

== History ==
The Hebron Lutheran Church, The Homeplace, James City Historic District, Madison County Courthouse, Madison County Courthouse Historic District, and Woodbourne are listed on the National Register of Historic Places.

== Geography ==
According to the United States Census Bureau, the town has a total area of 0.2 square mile (0.6 km^{2}), all land.

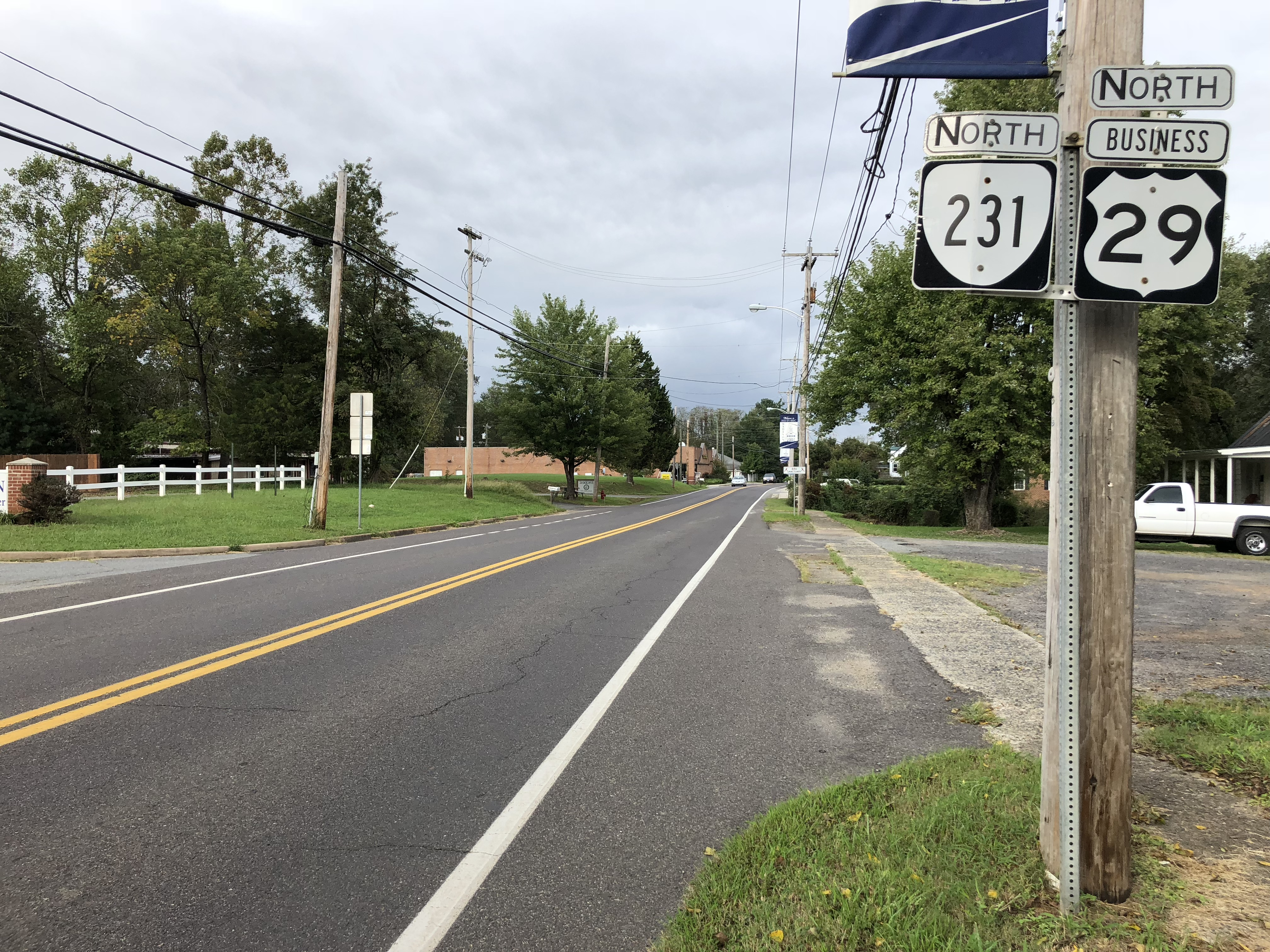
View north along US 29 Bus and SR 231 in Madison

== Transportation ==
The main highways serving Madison are U.S. Route 29 Business and Virginia State Route 231. Through the entirety of their trip through the town, both highways follow Main Street. US 29 Bus is the old alignment of U.S. Route 29, which now bypasses the town just to the southeast. US 29 extends southwest towards Charlottesville and northeast towards Washington, D.C. SR 231 extends southeast towards Orange and northwest towards Sperryville.

== Demographics ==
Historical population
Census	Pop.	Note	%±
1880	461		—
1890	353		−23.4%
1940	281		—
1950	308		9.6%
1960	301		−2.3%
1970	299		−0.7%
1980	267		−10.7%
1990	307		15.0%
2000	210		−31.6%
2010	229		9.0%
2020	205		−10.5%
U.S. Decennial Census

As of the census of 2000, there were 210 people, 109 households, and 57 families living in the town. The population density was 961.4 people per square mile (368.6/km^{2}). There were 115 housing units at an average density of 526.5 per square mile (201.8/km^{2}). The racial makeup of the town was 71.90% White and 28.10% African American.

There were 109 households, out of which 22.9% had children under the age of 18 living with them, 36.7% were married couples living together, 11.9% had a female householder with no husband present, and 47.7% were non-families. 44.0% of all households were made up of individuals, and 21.1% had someone living alone who was 65 years of age or older. The average household size was 1.93 and the average family size was 2.65.

In the town, the population was spread out, with 18.6% under the age of 18, 7.1% from 18 to 24, 25.2% from 25 to 44, 22.4% from 45 to 64, and 26.7% who were 65 years of age or older. The median age was 45 years. For every 100 females, there were 89.2 males. For every 100 females aged 18 and over, there were 76.3 males.

The median income for a household in the town was $32,188, and the median income for a family was $43,750. Males had a median income of $34,500 versus $18,958 for females. The per capita income for the town was $21,445. About 4.5% of families and 8.1% of the population were below the poverty line, including 9.1% of those under the age of eighteen and 5.1% of those 65 or over.

== Notable people ==
- Peter Early, U.S. Representative from and Governor of Georgia
- Robert Mallory, U.S. Representative from Kentucky
- Robert W. Malone, American physician and biochemist
