= Madison County Courthouse Historic District =

Historic district in Virginia, United States

- U.S. National Register of Historic Places
- U.S. Historic district
- Virginia Landmarks Register
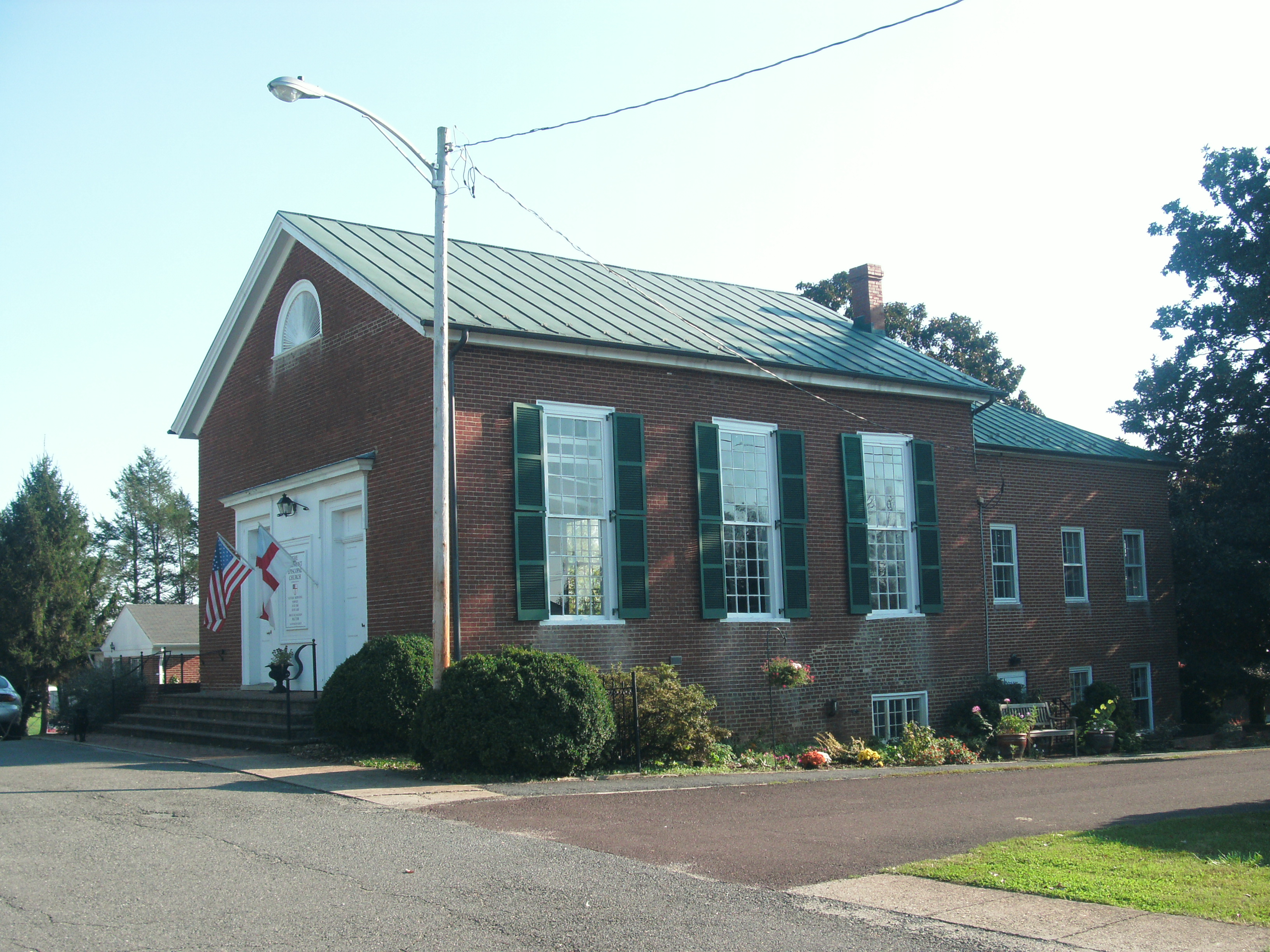
- Piedmont Episcopal Church

- Location within Virginia Location within the United States
- Location: Main St., Madison, Virginia
- Coordinates: 38°22′46″N 78°15′29″W
- Area: 95 acres (38 ha)
- Architectural style: Late 19th And 20th Century Revivals, Late Victorian, Greek Revival
- NRHP reference No.: 84003549
- VLR No.: 256-0004

Significant dates
- Added to NRHP: August 16, 1984
- Designated VLR: May 15, 1984

Madison County Courthouse Historic District is a national historic district located at Madison, Madison County, Virginia. The district encompasses 66 contributing buildings in the county seat of Madison. In addition to the separately listed Madison County Courthouse, there are a variety of residential, commercial, and institutional buildings dating from the early 19th to the 20th century. Notable buildings include the County Clerk's Office (1832), the Washington Tavern or Eagle House (ca. 1832), the Arcade (1830s), Piedmont Episcopal Church (1832-1834), the Madison Presbyterian and Methodist churches (1852-1853), Hunton House Hotel (1804, 1849), and the Linn Banks Masonic Lodge (1855).

It was listed on the National Register of Historic Places in 1984.
