= Design Toscano =

Mail order company

Design Toscano, Inc.
- Company type: Private
- Website type: E-commerce
- Available in: English
- Founded: 1989
- Headquarters: Wood Dale, Illinois
- Area served: Worldwide
- Founder: Michael Stopka
- Industry: Retail
- Website: www.designtoscano.com
- Launched: 1998

Design Toscano, Inc. is a US-based multinational mail order catalog and electronic commerce company founded by Michael Stopka in 1989. It is currently headquartered in Wood Dale, Illinois. It manufactures and sells statuary, historical reproductions, furniture and home decor. Design Toscano has been featured in Inc. magazine's top 500 fastest growing companies in 1996, 1997 and 1998. Its products were also featured in the SkyMall catalog.

Design Toscano is also distributed to the United Kingdom through licensed distributors and sold through many retailers who have the full range of Design Toscano products available in the United Kingdom.

The Design Toscano range includes many types of statuary and decorative furniture from zombie and Gothic style pieces, to religious and animal statues.
