= BrickHouse Security =

Indianapolis, Indiana-based security company

- Type: Private
- Founded: New York City, U.S. (2005)
- Founder: Todd Morris
- Headquarters: Indianapolis, Indiana
- Key people: Todd Morris (CEO)
- Products: personal GPS trackers; fleet vehicle trackers; dash cams; equipment trackers; fleet telematics; asset trackers; dashcams; connected vehicle software
- Number of employees: 78
- Website: http://www.brickhousesecurity.com

BrickHouse Security is a US company that sells GPS tracking, fleet telematics, asset tracking, dash camera, and connected-vehicle software products. The company's headquarters are in Indianapolis, Indiana.

== History ==
BrickHouse Security was founded by Todd Morris in 2005, in response to a market need he saw for a strong company selling home security and surveillance products, including computer security products, tracking devices and hidden cameras. BrickHouse Security launched as an online reseller with just two items for sale. The company was self-funded, and by February 2010, had grown to $12.5M in revenue with 35 employees.

In 2005, the company launched a campaign called Saving Jesus, to loan GPS trackers to churches over the Christmas holiday season in order to protect the Baby Jesus and other figurines in their Christmas displays from theft. The system used cloud tracking to send a text or email alert to the owner if the figurine was moved.

In 2008, the company ran a television commercial with battery producer Duracell, as part of Duracell's "Trusted Everywhere" campaign series promoting BrickHouse Security's RFID Child Locator with Long Distance Alert. Several media outlets including MSNBC and Consumers Digest voiced concerns that the ad played unnecessarily on parents' fears.

In 2014, the company's security system was reportedly used by Airbnb hosts concerned about misuse of their property by renters.

In 2015 BrickHouse Security acquired GPS device manufacturer Securus, known for the eZoom, eCare and SpotLite GPS tracking devices for children, elders and pets, as well as GPS tracking provider Zoombak, itself acquired by Securus in February 2011. The deal consolidated the three asset tracking businesses under one brand and one tracking platform.

== Products ==
BrickHouse Security sells GPS tracking and fleet telematics products under two separate brands. The company's flagship BrickHouse Security brand develops GPS tracking products for consumers and small businesses, including personal GPS trackers; fleet vehicle trackers; and dash cams and trackers that help companies track equipment and other assets. The BrickHouse GPS brand develops fleet telematics for more advanced fleet and asset management, including asset trackers, dashcams, connected vehicle software and other products for business and government customers.
