= Madison County Courthouse (Virginia) =

Historic courthouse in Virginia, United States

- U.S. National Register of Historic Places
- U.S. Historic district – Contributing property
- Virginia Landmarks Register
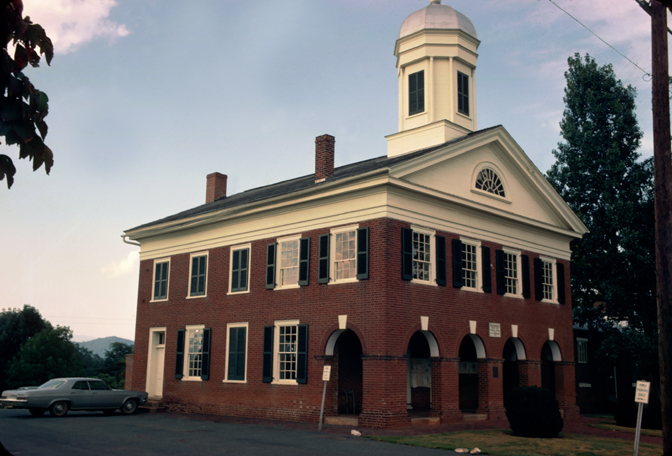
- Madison County Courthouse

- Location within Virginia Location within the United States
- Interactive map showing the location of Madison County Courthouse
- Location: U.S. 29, Madison, Virginia
- Coordinates: 38°22′49″N 78°15′29″W
- Area: 2 acres (0.81 ha)
- Built: 1828
- Built by: Malcolm F. Crawford and others
- Architectural style: Early Republic, Jeffersonian Classicism
- NRHP reference No.: 69000258
- VLR No.: 256-0002

Significant dates
- Added to NRHP: November 12, 1969
- Designated VLR: May 13, 1969

Madison County Courthouse is a historic courthouse located in Madison, serving Madison County, Virginia. It was built in 1828, and is a two-story, brick temple-form structure. On the facade the ground floor becomes an open arcade four-bays wide and one-bay deep. The gable roof is topped by a tall octagonal domed cupola. The building features a Tuscan order entablature with Tuscan pediments at either end.

The building was listed on the National Register of Historic Places in 1969. It is located in the Madison County Courthouse Historic District.
