= Bakugan: Legends =

- Season 5
- No. of episodes: 13 (26 segments)

Release
- Original network: Cartoon Network (CA); YouTube (JP); Netflix (US); 9Go! (AU); Okto (SG); TV3 (MY)
- Original release: March 1, 2023

Series chronology
- ← Previous; Bakugan: Evolutions

Bakugan: Legends (爆(ばく)丸(がん)レジェンズ, Bakugan Rejenzu) is the fifth and final season of the animated television series Bakugan: Battle Planet. It was directed by Kazuya Ichikawa, who helmed the first three seasons, for TMS Entertainment, Nelvana Enterprises and Spin Master Entertainment.

All thirteen episodes of the season launched on Netflix in Canada and the United States on March 1, 2023. It began streaming weekly in Japan on March 31, 2023. In Canada, the show made its linear television debut on Cartoon Network on April 1, with a secondary run on YTV beginning April 14, 2023, to July 7, 2023.

== Episode list ==
No. overall	No. in season	English Title Japanese title	Original release date	Japanese release date
313	1a	"A New Crisis"; Transliteration: "Aratanaru kiki" (Japanese: 新たなる危機)	March 1, 2023 (US); April 1, 2023 (CA)	March 31, 2023
The Awesome Brawlers discover that the gate is acting weird, which means that something is happening between Earth and Vestroia. Dan and Athena travel to Vestroia and brief Pyravian of the unusual occurrence. Pyravian says that Earth and Vestroia are somehow on the verge of separating from each other because the gate that connects the two planets will soon disappear. She suspects that all the threats that they have faced in the past is the result of this separation, which has damaged the gates in the process. Pyravian suggests that the only way to repair the damage is to use the Nova Power. Suddenly, a group of small Bakugan known as The Swarm appear and start attacking everyone. Dan, Athena, and the Council members attempt to fight them, but they manage to travel to Earth through the gate before it suddenly disappears, stranding Dan and Athena on Vestroia in the process. More of The Swarm appear and continue to attack them, prompting Dan, Athena and their Bakugan to flee with Pyravian while Goreene holds them off. They soon discover The Swarm extracting Vestroia's energy, and that they plan to do the same with Earth as well. Pyravian takes Dan and Athena to the Nova Reflector (which possesses a light which has the power to unite all hearts and bonds) which they can use to travel back to Earth, but they soon discover The Swarm attacking it. They manage to defeat a wave of them, but the tower begins to collapse. More of The Swarm appear, prompting Dan and Athena to return to Earth through the Nova Light, which also causes Earth and Vestroia to completely separate from each other. Back on Earth, the AB and Magnus are struggling against The Swarm, but luckily, Dan and Athena arrive with their newly evolved partners and manage to defeat the wave. They reunite with the AB, and Dan discovers that the Nova Light has also evolved the rest of their Bakugan, including Magnus's, much to his surprise.
314	1b	"Magnus, The Leader"; Transliteration: "Novua no Chikara" (Japanese: ノヴァの力)	March 1, 2023 (US); April 1, 2023 (CA)	March 31, 2023
The Swarm continues to attack the AB and their allies, but they use their new power to defeat them quickly. Afterwards, they inform Benton on everything that has happened on Vestroia. Dan and Athena also discover that they've been on Vestroia for a whole week because the two planets have pulled apart, and during their absence, everyone at the Bakugan Academy has been battling The Swarm, but it wasn't easy because they fight as one. It is also revealed that Magnus took leadership of the AB in their absence, much to Dan's shock. Coach Short soon contacts the AB after locating The Swarm and asks for their help immediately. They arrive too late as Coach Short has already been defeated by The Swarm. They attack the AB, but under Magnus's leadership, they successfully defeat the wave. Suddenly, a mighty Bakugan named Hanoj suddenly appears, much to everyone's shock.
315	2a	"The Ultimate Bakugan"; Transliteration: "Kyūkyoku no Bakugan, Hanōji!!" (Japanese: 究極の爆丸、ハノージ！！)	March 1, 2023 (US); April 8, 2023 (CA)	April 7, 2023
Earlier on Vestroia, Hanoj defeats Pyravian and Goreene and travels to Earth after sensing that his Swarm is under attack (by the AB, Magnus, and Athena), threatening to extract its energy as his own. Drago explains that long ago, Hanoj, the ultimate Bakugan and his Swarm nearly destroyed Vestroia, until he was sealed away deep within the planet. Dan, the AB, Magnus, and Athena attempt to fight Hanoj together, to no avail because of his ultimate power level and The Swarm which he uses to extract energy for himself. He prepares to take all of Earths energy for himself, but Dan decides to settle this dispute with a Battle Judgement by offering him the opportunity to gain energy from the Earth (depending on who wins each battle). Hanoj reluctantly agrees with the offer on one condition; he gets to choose the contestants for the Battle Judgement. After he leaves, Dan tells the AB that the Battle Judgement will be the perfect opportunity to buy Wynton extra time while he works on building a replacement for the Nova Reflector. They are determined to save both worlds by defeating Hanoj once and for all.
316	2b	"A New Core"; Transliteration: "Novua Koa" (Japanese: ノヴァコア)	March 1, 2023 (US); April 8, 2023 (CA)	April 7, 2023
While training for the Battle Judgement, Dan and Magnus discover a new type of Core called a Nova Core which is resonating with the Nova Light that their Bakugan possess before it disappears, much to Dan's dissatisfaction. They soon encounter Chad and Chester who have reunited once again after a long period of time away from each other. Chad becomes fascinated with the Nova Light that Drago possesses (oblivious to the fact that this power can't be taught) and challenges Dan to a battle which he accepts. He nearly defeats him due to the power of the Nova Light, but Chad refuses to give up, and Dan becomes impressed with his enthusiasm. The Nova Core suddenly reappears again, and Dan manages to catch it, and as a result, he obtains a Nova Baku-Fusion which he uses to defeat Chad. In the aftermath, Dan and Chad make amends for the amazing battle they had together. The next day, Dan attempts to catch the Nova Core again just like he did last time, but is unsuccessful, much to his dissatisfaction. Magnus on the other hand manages to catch a Nova Core of his own, obtaining Baku-gear in the process. This means that the Nova Cores possess more than one ability.
317	3a	"The Nova Technique, Part 1"; Transliteration: "Novua Waza Masutā Dai Sakusen! (Zenpen)" (Japanese: ノヴァ技マスター大作戦！(前編))	March 1, 2023 (US); April 15, 2023 (CA)	April 14, 2023
While training with Magnus, Dan tries but fails to master the nova technique (which is landing on the right Nova Core with the right ability). Not only that, the AB need to master the nova technique as well before the Battle Judgement begins. Luckily, Shun discovers that the different types of Nova Cores move in different patterns, each possessing their own ability. Now that they understand the rules, the AB become determined to master the technique on their own. While Ajit and Lightning succeed in mastering the technique for starters, Lia is having a hard time mastering the technique on her own as well. She decides to analyze herself on video in an attempt to find something that she can improve on. Lia soon discovers a flaw in the video where she's always chasing the Nova Core while throwing, and Pegatrix suggests that she wait for it to come to her. At the same time, Lia discovers Marco causing trouble at the park with his bullying and initiates a battle against him. He nearly defeats her, but Lia manages to obtain the Baku-Fusion Nova Core after waiting for it and successfully defeats Marco.
318	3b	"The Nova Technique, Part 2"; Transliteration: "Novua Waza Masutā Dai Sakusen! (Kōhen)" (Japanese: ノヴァ技マスター大作戦！(後編))	March 1, 2023 (US); April 15, 2023 (CA)	April 14, 2023
The AB continue to find their own way of mastering the nova technique, in which Wynton and Shun are successful. Meanwhile at the Academy, Athena heads to Faustus's office to retrieve some information on Nova Energy which might help them create a new Nova Reflector. She discovers McQ snooping around his office and finding the memory stick which contains all of Faustus's research data. McQ flees with the memory stick, but fails to get far from Athena. He initiates a battle against her and gains the upper hand by threatening to destroy the memory stick. Luckily, Athena stands up to McQ and successfully defeats him with a Nanogan Nova Core, thus retrieving the memory stick, and mastering the nova technique. In the aftermath, Athena shows Dan the memory stick which contains a possible hint that could help them seal Hanoj away for good.
319	4a	"New Move Blues"; Transliteration: "Dan wa Taiki Bansei!?" (Japanese: ダンは大器晩成！？)	March 1, 2023 (US); April 22, 2023 (CA)	April 21, 2023
The AB have successfully mastered the nova technique, with the exception of Dan who tries numerous times to master it as well, but is unsuccessful. He tries learning the techniques of the AB, hoping that one of them will work, but fails. Later, Trey shows up and challenges Dan to a Baku-battle which he reluctantly accepts. However, instead of focusing on the battle, Dan continues his attempts to master the nova technique but is still unsuccessful, upsetting Trey in the process. Realizing from Trey that he forgot to have fun like he always does when battling, Dan succeeds in mastering his own technique and successfully defeats Trey with a Nanogan Nova Core. In the aftermath, Dan and Trey make amends for the amazing battle they had together. Now that he has mastered the Nova Cores, Dan is now fully prepared for the Battle Judgement against Hanoj.
320	4b	"Showdown At Gold Rodeo Park!"; Transliteration: "Oretachi Bakugan Kaubōi!!" (Japanese: 俺たち爆丸カウボーイ！！)	March 1, 2023 (US); April 22, 2023 (CA)	April 21, 2023
Dan invites Wynton and Lia to a western theme tourist attraction called Gold Rodeo Park. They decline at first because they're busy getting ready for the Battle Judgement, and making plans for a new Nova Reflector, but Dan changes their minds when he makes generous offers that seem beneficial to them. Arriving at the attraction, they discover the place completely deserted. They manage to save a young boy named Joey from a bandit who flees from Raymond, the sheriff and owner of Gold Rodeo Park. Raymond explains that a group of bandits called the Smell Brawlers have been causing a lot of trouble at the park recently for the past year after he refused to sell the place to them. Since then, customers have stopped visiting this attraction because the bandits have been chasing them away with their Bakugan. Raymond also says that he's too afraid to call the authorities because if the story reaches the news, it will ruin the park's reputation for good. Determined to save Gold Rodeo Park, Dan, Wynton, and Lia confront the bandits led by Stinky Tom. He flees while Dan chases after him, leaving Wynton and Lia to deal with the other two bandits. Dan chases Tom through the mines, and despite taking a couple detours, he succeeds in finding him in an underground lake. A battle ensues, and Dan successfully defeats Tom in a matter of minutes. In a surprising turn of events, Raymond discovers gold in the mines, which explains why the bandits have been chasing away the customers in the first place because they wanted to keep it for themselves. In the aftermath, Raymond gives Dan, Wynton, and Lia lifetime passes to Gold Rodeo Park as a token of his appreciation for getting rid of the bandits.
321	5a	"The Fated First Battle"; Transliteration: "Minami no Shima de no Ichi Kaisen! !" (Japanese: 南の島での1回戦！！)	March 1, 2023 (US); April 29, 2023 (CA)	April 28, 2023
The AB and Magnus travel to Maglie Island where The Swarm is extracting its energy and reunite with Kino who attempted to defend the island but was defeated by them. Hanoj appears in holographic form and reveals that the first battle in the Battle Judgement will take place on Maglie Island, and he agrees to return the energy to the island if they win. He sends out his first opponent to face them, revealed to be Storm. Ajit decides to battle him due to their recent history together while the AB decide to evacuate the island at Drago's behest. In the midst of the battle, Storm nearly defeats Ajit due to the Nova Power that was given to him by Hanoj. More than that, the island begins to crumble due to The Swarm continuing to drain its energy. Ajit stands up to Storm by declaring his dedication to the AB since he helped them save the world from countless dangers. He then discovers a Nova Core, but a bunch of fallen trees have blocked his path. Remembering Storm's recent lessons, especially the one about using his imagination back when he was a Phantom Thief, Ajit makes a comeback and successfully defeats him with a Strength Mode Nova Core. As per their agreement, Hanoj returns the energy to Maglie Island as promised. In the aftermath, Storm, having heard Ajit's words, advises him to continue down his own path and prove to him that he can save the world from Hanoj, which the latter agrees to do.
322	5b	"Time To Brawl!"; Transliteration: "Toki no Kawa de no Taiketsu" (Japanese: 時の川での対決)	March 1, 2023 (US); April 29, 2023 (CA)	April 28, 2023
Hanoj takes the AB to Vestroia where the next battle will take place, and their opponents are revealed to be Everett and McQ, having made a deal with the former to guarantee their survival. Wynton and Lia decide to battle them. As the battle begins, Wynton suddenly turns old due to the effects of this place called the River of Time. McQ is also effected as well because The Swarm is draining its energy, which has tampered with the changes of this place. Wynton manages to defeat McQ, but unbeknownst to him, Everett uses a time stone (which has the ability to reverse time) to undo his defeat. In a surprising turn of events, Wynton discovers another type of time stone which has the ability to flash forward time. Lia uses it to their advantage, causing Everett's stone to break, including Lia's stone due to the strain of altering time repeatedly. After returning to normal, both Wynton and Lia succeed in defeating Everett and McQ. However, Everett uses another time stone to undo their defeat, and together, he and McQ successfully defeat Wynton and Lia, thus eliminating them from the Battle Judgement. As a result, Hanoj drains the energy from the area as he intended to. In the aftermath, Wynton and Lia apologize for their loss, though they were completely unaware that they would cheat like that. Magnus on the other hand starts to believe that he can defeat all of Hanoj's opponents by himself if the AB lose, much to Dan's dissatisfaction.
323	6a	"Back to Brakistan"; Transliteration: "Chikarō no Tetsu Kamen" (Japanese: 地下牢の鉄仮面)	March 1, 2023 (US); May 6, 2023 (CA)	May 5, 2023
Hanoj takes the AB to Brakistan where the next battle will take place as The Swarm begins to extract its energy. The people of Brakistan mistake the AB for attacking their country and imprison them, but they are soon released after the misunderstanding is cleared up. They soon meet Tim Brakken, Lord Brakken's uncle who explains that the latter is attending an "international conference" elsewhere, and that he left him in charge of running Brakkistan in his absence. He agrees to allow the AB to head back out into the desert to compete in the Battle Judgement. As they are heading out, they run into Callous who explains that Tim has taken over the whole country, and that he lied about Brakken being somewhere else, having captured and imprisoned him somewhere. That's when Lia deduces that the man in the mask was Brakken all along; he was attempting to ask for help this whole time. Callous guides the AB through the dungeon in their attempt to rescue Brakken, while Dan and Magnus head for the Battle Judgement. They succeed in freeing Brakken as they make their escape, and Callous decides to remain behind to hold off the guards in order to buy them enough time to escape. They are soon stopped by Tim who initiates a battle against Lia, Lightning, and Brakken, and he starts using traps to his advantage. Luckily, Lia and Brakken stand up to him, and the former and Lightning successfully defeat him, thus ending his reign over Brakkistan. In the aftermath, Brakken takes back his position as ruler of Brakkistan, and the AB head back out into the desert to compete in the third match of the Battle Judgement.
324	6b	"The Eye of The Sandstorm"; Transliteration: "Burakisutan o Sukue!" (Japanese: ブラキスタンを救え！)	March 1, 2023 (US); May 6, 2023 (CA)	May 5, 2023
Dan and Magnus are struggling to make it to the Battle Judgement in time due to a sandstorm standing in their way. It then makes its way to the city, prompting Dan and Drago to try and stop it. Meanwhile, the AB manage to make it in time for the Battle Judgement where they have to face Everett and McQ again. Shun and Ajit decide to battle them, hoping that they can win this one for sure. In the midst of the battle, the wind from the sandstorm begins to interfere with Ajit's attempt to use the Nova Cores, but upon hearing Shun's advice that involves waiting for the right moment, he uses this opportunity to his advantage. Everett and McQ end up turning against each other for a brief moment due to a lack of teamwork, and as a result, Shun successfully defeats Everett. But alas, McQ makes a comeback and successfully defeats Ajit, thus eliminating him from the Battle Judgement. However, Shun makes a comeback and successfully defeats McQ with a Nanogan Nova Core. As a result, Hanoj returns the energy to the desert. Meanwhile, Lia, Lightning, Dan, and Magnus attempt to stop the sandstorm from destroying Brakkistan, but luckily, it begins to fade away, most likely because Shun won the battle. In the end, Brakken decides to celebrate "Lia's" victory for saving his country even though the AB and Magnus helped too, much to their dissatisfaction.
325	7a	"To Catch A Swarm"; Transliteration: "Suwāmu o tsukamaero!" (Japanese: スワームを捕まえろ！)	March 1, 2023 (US); May 13, 2023 (CA)	May 12, 2023
The AB plan to capture a Swarm because Wynton plans to use it for his invention, and they plan to use its warp ability to travel to Vestroia so that Wynton can inspect the original Nova Reflector. Suddenly, a small Swarm appears from out of nowhere, different from the rest of The Swarm. The AB attempt to catch him numerous times, but they are unsuccessful. Luckily, Magnus reluctantly lends a hand and they manage to catch it. However, the Swarm begins to use his warp ability as he teleports the AB, Magnus, and Athena to random locations before arriving in an unusual location. After escaping a group of full-grown Swarm, the AB, Magnus, and Athena come face to face with Hanoj who reveals that the place they're in used to be his former prison, until he turned it into a castle of his own. He entices them into a battle, and despite their best efforts, he easily overpowers all of the Brawlers. Realizing that they need to retreat for now, Dan advises Lia, Wynton, and Shun to find the Swarm while they hold off Hanoj for as long as possible. They continue to chase after him, until he becomes fascinated with Shun's Tumpee keychain due to the fact that it's sparkly. Shun offers to give him the keychain if he agrees to help everyone escape from Hanoj. Before Hanoj can finish off the remaining Brawlers, Lia, Wynton, and Shun return with the Swarm as he teleports everyone out of Hanoj's castle. Dan decides to name him Buzzy, and Shun agrees with it. In the end, Magnus tells the AB and Athena that he's leaving them because he has something important to do.
326	7b	"The Show Must Go On"; Transliteration: "Kabū no Hattari TV Shō" (Japanese: カブ―のハッタリTVショー)	March 1, 2023 (US); May 13, 2023 (CA)	May 12, 2023
The AB discover that Cubbo is going to be on Veronica's show as a special guest. She also convinces them to be surprise guests on the show as well. During the live interview, Cubbo starts making up stories about his past in an attempt to gain more views on his channel, much to the AB's annoyance, and the audience's delight. In a shocking turn of events, Strata suddenly appears, intending to get revenge on Cubbo for roasting him. Determined to save Veronica's show, Dan and Lia stage a battle against Strata by making it look like it's part of the show. They easily defeat him, and he flees in anger. In the aftermath, Cubbo apologizes for lying on the show and explains that he got so excited that he ended up telling entertaining stories without telling the truth. However, the apology is revealed to be a lie, much to Dan and Drago's annoyance.
327	8a	"Attack On Los Volmos"; Transliteration: "Raishū! Chiko & Vuairokku!" (Japanese: 来襲！チコ&ヴァイロック！)	March 1, 2023 (US); May 20, 2023 (CA)	May 19, 2023
Hanoj is furious that the AB invaded his castle recently and sends The Swarm to absorb the energy in Los Volmos, prompting the AB to take action immediately. At the behest of Shun, Buzzy takes Wynton, Ajit, and Athena to Vestroia so that they can study the Nova Reflector there. The rest of the AB are soon confronted by Tiko and Viloch, whom Hanoj has sent for the Battle Judgement match, along with their partners Tripp and Reed. Shun and Lightning decide to battle them, while the former advises Dan and Lia to evacuate the city. Shun and Lightning put up a massive fight, but Tripp and Reed overpower them easily. They reveal that Hanoj used his Nova Power (which is connected to the past) to bring Tiko and Viloch to the present. Shun and Lightning manage to make a comeback with the Nova Cores, but despite their best efforts, Tripp and Reed successfully defeat them, thus eliminating them from the Battle Judgement. As a result, Hanoj continues to absorb the remaining energy in Los Volmos. In the aftermath, Dan, Lia, and the citizens watch as Los Volmos begins to decay from the energy that was absorbed by Hanoj.
328	8b	"Brawl By The Sea"; Transliteration: "Sofī to no Kaijō Batoru!" (Japanese: ソフィーとの海上バトル！)	March 1, 2023 (US); May 20, 2023 (CA)	May 19, 2023
Wynton, Ajit, and Athena arrive on Vestroia and discover the remains of the Nova Reflector. Buzzy runs off and is confronted by Apollyon, but only for a brief moment as the trio manage to catch up to him. Pyravian arrives and reveals that The Swarm attacked Aureopolis and absorbed all of the energy there a while back. Wynton says that they're attempting to build a new Nova Reflector on Earth, but since they're having trouble studying the old one that was destroyed recently, Pyravian directs him to a mechanism that has the ability to control the Nova Power. Even though it's damaged, Wynton, Ajit, and Athena decide to bring it back to Earth in order to analyze it, and possibly fix it up so that they can use it to build their own Reflector. Meanwhile on Earth, Los Volmos is now in ruins ever since Hanoj absorbed all of the energy there. Dan is determined to win the next battle and return the city to normal. He is soon contacted by Sophie who challenges him to a Baku-battle after revealing that she blocked off the entrance to the port with a huge tanker, and captured the crew there. The AB arrive at the port, and Dan advises Lia to rescue the crew while he faces Sophie in battle. However, Dan discovers that the ship is an oil tanker; if Drago uses his abilities, then the ship will explode. Sophie reveals to Dan that she intends to defeat him so that she can earn her place in the Battle Judgement. In a turn of events, Dan summons Arcleon and successfully defeats Sophie who flees while swearing revenge on him. After rescuing the crew, the AB flee as The Swarm begins to absorb the energy from the oil tanker completely. In the aftermath, the AB reunite with Ajit, Athena, and Wynton, and he shows them the mechanism that they can use to build their own Reflector capable of sealing Hanoj away for good.
329	9a	"Ready To Crumble"; Transliteration: "Nejireta Kūkan" (Japanese: ねじれた空間)	March 1, 2023 (US); May 27, 2023 (CA)	May 26, 2023
Hanoj takes the AB to Vestroia, to a cavern in Darkavia where the next match will take place, and Dan's opponent is revealed to be Tripp. As the battle begins, unbeknownst to Dan and Drago, Tripp starts using the tunnels to his advantage. He nearly defeats them, but they become determined to win in order to prevent the same thing from repeating itself (which is Hanoj and The Swarm absorbing all the energy from another place). Upon remembering what Lia and Shun had told him earlier before the Battle Judgement, Dan summons Arcleon who destroys the tunnels so that Tripp can no longer use them to his advantage. The cavern begins to collapse due to The Swarm's energy drain, and Dan advises Buzzy to get his friends to safety while he continues the battle. Tripp is hesitant to continue the battle because the cavern will most likely collapse, but Dan succeeds in defeating him and escapes the cavern, bringing the former along with him. Before Hanoj can return the energy to Darkavia, Ferascal suddenly appears and persuades him to give it to Earth instead. Lightning and Ferascal share a tender reunion with each other, and the latter explains that she and the other Bakugan want to help the people on Earth that are in danger, which is why she persuaded Hanoj to return the energy to Earth in the first place. This means that Los Volmos will return to normal soon. In the end, Dan becomes determined to defeat Hanoj and return the energy to Earth and Vestroia once and for all.
330	9b	"Yucatan Slam"; Transliteration: "Enerugī o Torimodose!" (Japanese: エネルギーを取り戻せ！)	March 1, 2023 (US); May 27, 2023 (CA)	May 26, 2023
The Swarm begins to return the energy to Los Volmos while Wynton and Athena collect data on them for a particular purpose. Wynton reveals that he and Athena have created an energy flow reversal device which has the ability to return the energy to where it came from, and that they plan to use Buzzy in order to do so. Their plan is to take the energy back from Hanoj, hoping that he won't notice it to begin with. The AB and Athena teleport to the ruins of the Yucatan Peninsula where its energy has already been drained by The Swarm. Wynton activates the device as Buzzy begins to return the energy to where it belongs. Just then, The Swarm suddenly appears, prompting the AB and Athena to protect Buzzy. They put up a massive fight, until Hanoj appears and figures out that they were attempting to steal his energy, prompting him to take it back by force. Wynton succeeds in removing the device from Buzzy just before it explodes. Since their plan has failed, Athena calls for an immediate retreat, but Buzzy is too weak to teleport everyone. Before Hanoj can finish everyone off, he somehow manages to use his remaining strength to get everyone to safety while the former reclaims the energy in the Yucatan Peninsula. In the aftermath, the AB and Athena are still sulking after their plan ended in failure, but they soon realize that everyone in the world is depending on them to defeat Hanoj once and for all since they helped return Los Volmos to normal, much to their satisfaction.
331	10a	"Clash In The Capital"; Transliteration: "Fukkatsu no Fausuto" (Japanese: 復活のファウスト)	March 1, 2023 (US); June 3, 2023 (CA)	June 2, 2023
The AB arrive in Aureopolis where the next match will take place, and their opponent is Reed. However, Hanoj decides to make this a two-on-two match and brings out "Faustus" as their second opponent, and it is revealed that "Faustus" and Wrath are two separate beings once again after being combined for a long period of time, thanks to Hanoj. As the battle begins, "Faustus" reveals that he intends to win the Battle Judgement so that Hanoj will allow him to claim this body permanently, meaning that the old Faustus will be lost forever. He overpowers Athena, but she makes a comeback and successfully defeats him because of her determination to save both Earth and Vestroia. But alas, Blitz Fox has used up all of her power and returns to ball form, and Hanoj declares this battle a draw. In a surprising turn of events, Athena deduces that Faustus has returned to his old self again and explains that he was researching the Nova Power in order to find a way to return to his normal self completely since the Nova Light has the power to combine the past with present minds; in other words, Faustus was hoping to return to the point before his evil personality first appeared. In the meantime, Dan is struggling against Reed for a brief moment, but he makes a comeback and successfully defeats him with a Nanogan Nova Core. This means that he and Drago are the only ones left in the Battle Judgement as they become determined to win the remaining two battles once and for all.
332	10b	"Lightning's Odyssey"; Transliteration: "Inu to Neko no Uchū Dai Batoru!" (Japanese: 犬と猫の宇宙大バトル！)	March 1, 2023 (US); June 3, 2023 (CA)	June 2, 2023
While the AB come up with a strategy for Dan to defeat Hanoj's last two opponents, Lightning and Howlkor decide to go for a walk, but they somehow end up in outer space, aboard a spaceship. They meet a cosmic space dog named Canis who asks for their help. She explains that the dogs (led by Canis) and cats (led by Felis) have been locked in a feud for 30 million years because they couldn't decide which faction is superior, cats or dogs, and since then, nothing has been settled between them. Canis and Felis have agreed to choose a representative to compete for them in order to end the feud once and for all. Although reluctant at first, Lightning agrees to help her. They arrive on a planet where the competition will take place. Felis arrives with his representative, revealed to be Ebony, much to Lightning's shock. The goal is to capture the flag on top of the mountain. The competition begins as Lightning and Ebony race towards the mountain with their Bakugan. However, Felis starts using his cosmic powers to distract Lightning, prompting Canis to use her cosmic powers to distract Ebony. After numerous distractions, Lightning and Ebony reach the flag at the same time, and Ebony decides to settle this with a Baku-battle which Lightning wins. Despite his victory, Ebony attempts to retrieve the flag, but both her and Lightning grab it at the same time, resulting in a tie. In a shocking turn of events, Lightning wakes up all of a sudden, assuming it was all a dream, or so we thought.
333	11a	"Wreaking Haavik!"; Transliteration: "Hāvuikku Sansen!" (Japanese: ハーヴィック参戦！)	March 1, 2023 (US); June 10, 2023 (CA)	June 9, 2023
Wynton and Athena give the AB an update on the work progress of the new Nova Reflector which should be fully complete in a few days, thanks to Faustus's help. Hanoj soon arrives and takes the AB to Haora where the semi-final battle will take place. They eventually discover that Haora is completely different because The Swarm has already begun to drain the energy from this place. Much to their complete shock, the AB discover that Haavik is Dan's opponent. As the battle begins, Dan discovers that Haavik has changed the gravitational properties of Haora, making it impossible for him to battle normally. More than that, Haavik is using explosives to his advantage. He nearly defeats him, but thanks to Shun, Dan discovers that the arena below them is the only place that hasn't been affected by the gravitational properties since its energy hasn't been drained yet. He manages to obtain a Nova Baku-Fusion Core, which means that Drago is no longer affected by the gravitational properties in Haora. As a result, Dan successfully defeats Haavik after using his explosives against him. This means that the final battle is nearly upon the AB. In the end, Haavik flees from the Mechanoids that are still pursuing him, and the AB hope that he won't be returning anytime soon.
334	11b	"Judgement Night"; Transliteration: "Kessen! Dan VS Magunasu" (Japanese: 決戦！ダンVSマグナス)	March 1, 2023 (US); June 10, 2023 (CA)	June 9, 2023
Dan is preparing for the final battle in the Battle Judgement. More than that, he still doesn't understand why Magnus chose to leave all of a sudden. The AB soon learn that the new Nova Reflector will be ready in no time. Hanoj suddenly appears and takes the AB back to Vestroia where the final battle will take place, and Dan's final opponent is revealed to be Magnus. Magnus still intends to settle his score with Dan once and for all, which didn't work out in the last Battle Judgement since Viloch interrupted it in the first place. The battle begins as Dan and Magnus go all out, intending to give it everything they've got. Meanwhile, the Nova Reflector is nearly complete, and Benton states that the only way to activate it is to sacrifice the stability. It all comes down to this as the final battle between Dan and Magnus continues.
335	12a	"An Alliance Of Strength"; Transliteration: "Magunasu no Nerai" (Japanese: マグナスの狙い)	March 1, 2023 (US); June 17, 2023 (CA)	June 16, 2023
The final battle between Dan and Magnus continues as they continue to go all out. The AB manage to figure out Magnus's plan; every time he faces Dan at their full strength, Drago and Nillious grow stronger, thus creating more energy. Magnus reveals that the reason he left the AB in the first place was because he needed to get stronger, following his previous encounter with Hanoj in his castle, having learned just how strong he really is in comparison to his own strength, but still, he failed to reach Hanoj's power level. He also says that battling Dan would give him the opportunity to become even stronger than before, strong enough to defeat Hanoj himself. Furthermore, Magnus begins to doubt that Hanoj will keep his promise to leave Earth and Vestroia alone. Therefore, he believes that he might have a chance against Hanoj if he uses Dan and Drago's power; in other words, he decides to team up with them for that purpose. Dan and Magnus combine their powers and manage to knock down Hanoj for starters. Meanwhile, Wynton, Athena, Benton, and Faustus travel to Vestroia with the newly completed Nova Reflector in their attempt to draw out the Nova Light which they'll use to seal Hanoj away for good. Luckily, Wynton manages to find the perfect spot to activate it, thanks to Buzzy as it starts to admit the Nova Light. Dan and Magnus continue to fight Hanoj who is using The Swarm as a shield. The rest of the AB join in to fight as well, but Hanoj begins to sense a strong surge of Nova Power, which is coming from the Nova Reflector and travels there to most likely destroy it. The AB and Magnus each grab on to a Swarm as they teleport to the Nova Reflector as well, leaving Dan and Drago behind in the process because Dan believes that something is not right.
336	12b	"The Ultimate Plan"; Transliteration: "Novua Baku Kurosu! Dorago Niriasu" (Japanese: ノヴァ爆クロス！ドラゴ×ニリアス)	March 1, 2023 (US); June 17, 2023 (CA)	June 16, 2023
The AB and Magnus reunite with Wynton and Athena as they prepare to battle The Swarm in their attempt to buy Benton and Faustus some time until the Nova Reflector is fully charged with energy. They put up a massive fight, but they continue to outnumber them. Luckily, the council members arrive to assist them. Hanoj nearly defeats Nillious and prepares to finish him off, but Dan and Drago manage to save him. Realizing that The Swarm moves in unison to Hanoj's will, Dan tells Magnus that they need to work together like they do; in other words, they need to act like one body and one mind as well. Dan and Magnus succeed in combining Drago and Nillious together, forming Dragonoid x Nillious in the process, which means that they are now equally matched to Hanoj. In a turn of events, Benton hits Hanoj with the Nova Light, hoping that it will seal him away for good, but he absorbs the energy through The Swarm, which was his plan all along. Hanoj reveals that he already knew that they were planning to build a new Nova Reflector, and that he used this opportunity to wait for the right moment to claim the Nova Power as his own. Everyone is at a standstill now as they witness Hanoj more powerful than ever.
337	13a	"Power In Numbers"; Transliteration: "Arutimetto Hanōji" (Japanese: アルティメットハノージ)	March 1, 2023 (US); June 24, 2023 (CA)	June 23, 2023
Dan and Magnus continue to battle Hanoj who is more powerful than ever because of the Nova Light. Hanoj reveals that when the AB and their allies infiltrated his castle by accident, he overheard their plan to build a new Nova Reflector, which is why he decided to let them go so that they would continue to build it for him when the time was right for him to harness the Nova Energy for himself. The AB and all their allies rally together to take on Hanoj, but he easily defeats them all. Lia suggests to Wynton that they use the Nova Reflector on Hanoj again since The Swarm is gone, which means that he won't be able to absorb the energy again. However, Hanoj says that he has become one with The Swarm, which means that he now has their ability to absorb energy. Hoping to turn the tides in their favor, Dan asks Benton to use the Nova Reflector on Drago x Nillious, hoping that it will make them even stronger as well. Benton reluctantly agrees at Wynton's behest and shoots the Nova Light at Drago x Nillious, making them even stronger than before. In a shocking turn of events, all of Drago and Nillious's past forms divide and unite together with Drago x Nillious, allowing them to make a successful comeback. However, Hanoj begins to absorb the energy from Vestroia, and as a result, he successfully defeats Dan and Magnus.
338	13b	"Bakugan Brawl!"; Transliteration: "Mirai e no Bakugan Burō" (Japanese: 未来への爆丸ブロー)	March 1, 2023 (US); June 24, 2023 (CA)	June 23, 2023
Dan and Magnus have been defeated by Hanoj. Upon discovering the planet where Hanoj's castle resides, which used to be his former prison, Wynton says that they need to use it to lock him up again. Determined to save Earth and Vestroia from Hanoj's wrath, Dan and Drago begin to draw on the power of the bond that they share together by reflecting on the first time they met. They manage to hit the planet above them as the Nova Energy begins to resonate with the AB, Magnus, and Athena's Bakugan. They plan to charge it with Nova Energy so that they can use it to seal Hanoj away for good this time. The AB and Athena rally together once more against Hanoj, while Dan and Magnus summon Drago x Nillious and all their past forms once again as they push the planet towards Hanoj. Hanoj is unable to withstand their power because of it, and as a result, he is imprisoned inside the planet once again. In the aftermath, the AB and all their friends and allies from Earth come together to rebuild Vestroia. Afterwards, they soon learn from the Council that they have to split up with them for good because Earth and Vestroia have continued to pull away from each other, which means that the Bakugan can no longer survive on Earth. The AB have no choice but to say goodbye to their beloved partners. Life has returned to normal again, even though they miss their Bakugan partners a lot. Luckily thanks to Buzzy's warp ability, they're able to visit the AB every once in a while from Vestroia. The series concludes with Magnus challenging Dan to a Baku-battle which he happily accepts.
