= Bakugan: Evolutions =

- Season 4
- No. of episodes: 28 (56 segments)

Release
- Original network: Teletoon (CA); YouTube (JP); Netflix (US); 9Go! (AU); Okto (SG); TV Okey (MY)
- Original release: February 6 – October 23, 2022

Season chronology
- ← Previous; Bakugan: Geogan Rising Next → Bakugan: Legends

Bakugan: Evolutions (爆(ばく)丸(がん)エボリューションズ, Bakugan Eboryūshonzu) is the fourth season of the animated television series Bakugan: Battle Planet. It was formally announced on October 13, 2021.

The season premiered in Canada on Teletoon on February 6, 2022. and was later rebroadcast on YTV starting February 11, 2022. On March 4, 2022, the Japanese version debuted bi-weekly on April 1, 2022. Netflix streamed the first half of Bakugan: Evolutions on April 1, 2022. Netflix released the second half on September 1, 2022.

== Episode list ==
No. overall	No. in season	Title	Original release date	Japanese release date
257 258	1	"Evolutions Unleashed! " Transliteration: "Eremento Burō Kaihō!" (Japanese: エレメントブロー開放！)	April 10, 2022 (CA); April 1, 2022 (US)	April 29, 2022
Following Drago's return to Earth, the remaining Awesome Brawlers are still sad because their original partners are still recovering from their battle with Haavik. They soon discover a news report where a strange energy surge has erupted onto the Earth's surface. Because the AB still don't have their Bakugan partners, Dan and Drago have no choice but to investigate it on their own. Upon arrival, Dan and Drago meet a new group of Elemental Brawlers led by Marlowe Faustus who have arrived to deal with the energy surge. They are soon attacked by a Bakugan corrupted by the energy surge. Luckily, Faustus easily defeats it, with the help of his Nanogan of course, with Athena successfully containing the energy surge before returning to the Academy. The rest of the AB soon learn about the surges erupting across the world, as well as the new group of Elemental Brawlers and their heroic actions saving people from these disasters dubbed as "The Elemental Storm," leaving them concerned about it. Drago begins to suspect that these surges are coming from Vestroia, and Dan suspects that the Elemental Brawlers must be causing these energy outbreaks to begin with. Wynton manages to pinpoint the location of the next energy surge which suddenly emerges near Studio D all of a sudden. Drago begins absorbing the Elemental Energy, but is presumably destroyed in the process. Suddenly, a gateway appears, and the AB happily reunite with Trox, Pegatrix, Hydorous, Howlkor, and Pharol, having fully recovered from their hibernation. In another shocking revelation, Dan discovers Drago alive and well, but also with a sudden change of appearance. Drago begins to explain that the explosion created a portal which allowed him to return to Vestroia, in the Shrine of Recovery. He then transferred the Elemental Energy to the AB original Bakugan, which gave them their Elemental forms to begin with. They are determined to stop the Elemental Storms before they destroy both worlds. Later, Dan lures the Elemental Brawlers with a false report and prepares to battle them alongside the AB. Despite their best efforts, the Elemental Brawlers easily defeat them, with the exception of Dan. Using a burst of Elemental Energy from Drago, Dan summons an elemental core which he uses on Drago as he summons his Nanogan Fury. Before the battle between Dan and Athena can continue, Faustus calls off the fight and tells Dan that they're all on the same side. He introduces himself to the AB and becomes impressed with Dan's potential in Elemental brawling and the summoning of his Nanogan, thinking that he could help save the world with them. Faustus explains that he's been studying the Elemental Energy Surges that are threatening the world as we speak. Therefore, he has built a school called the Bakugan Academy to train the best Brawlers in Elemental brawling in order to prepare them for when they have to deal with these surges to begin with. After introducing the rest of his team to the AB, Faustus asks them to come visit them at the Bakugan Academy. Arriving at the Academy, Faustus gives the AB an official tour of the campus where they seem to be impressed with what is being offered here. During an experiment with Professor K, a strong Elemental Energy Surge suddenly appears on campus. A gate suddenly opens up which summons an unknown Darkus Bakugan as he starts attacking the school. The Elemental Brawlers battle the unknown Darkus Bakugan while Faustus advises the AB to evacuate the campus immediately. During the battle, the unknown Darkus Bakugan starts absorbing the Elemental Energy from their attacks, causing it to grow even bigger and stronger. The AB return and attempt to tell the Elemental Brawlers to stop attacking because they're only feeding him more energy, to no avail. This results in the unknown Darkus Bakugan easily defeating most of the Elemental Brawlers. Before he can finish off Faustus, he soon flies off somewhere. Wynton discovers another Elemental Energy Surge at the Power Plant and deduces that the unknown Darkus Bakugan is heading there to absorb all the energy, which will cause an overload and destroy everything in Los Volmos. The AB, determined to stop the unknown Darkus Bakugan from reaching the Power Plant, intercept him and attempt to defeat him, but their Bakugan are still having trouble controlling their Elemental powers and are nearly defeated. Dan and Drago continue to pursue the unknown Darkus Bakugan where they attempt to slow him down by blocking his path and using physical attacks, but it's still not enough. Next, they attempt to trap him with the rubble from Drago's Back Draft ability, but he easily breaks free and defeats Drago before heading off to the Power Plant. Still wondering what to do on how to defeat that unknown Darkus Bakugan, the AB suggest to Dan that they ask for help from the Elemental Brawlers. Dan determanly agrees because combining their brawling skills with Faustus's knowledge of Elemental Energy will give them the advantage needed to take down the unknown Darkus Bakugan. Wynton contacts Faustus, and Dan asks him for his help with stopping that Bakugan. Faustus apologizes to Dan for not listening to him in the first place and tells him that the only way to stop that Bakugan is to overpower Drago with a massive amount of Elemental Energy. Dan is reluctant to go through with this plan after what happened to Drago earlier, which nearly destroyed him, but after realizing that he gave that energy to the original Bakugan of the AB, he eventually agrees with it because he believes that they can also transfer it back to Drago as well. The Bakugan begin to transfer their Elemental Energy back to Drago, causing him to evolve into Strength Mode, which means that he now has the power to stop the unknown Darkus Bakugan. He soon arrives at the Power Plant and starts absorbing the Elemental Energy there, but Drago arrives and battles him with his new power. Together with Dan, they successfully defeat the unknown Darkus Bakugan. In the aftermath, Faustus tells the AB that the Academy will start investigating this incident involving that Bakugan that was corrupted by the Elemental Energy Surge. Impressed with the AB knowledge and skills, Faustus asks them if they will consider joining the Bakugan Academy, and the AB say that they will think about it. Later, Wrath becomes concerned about Faustus's decision to share their knowledge of Elemental Brawling with the AB, but Faustus tells him that they are more than capable of helping him stop the Elemental Energy Surges that are leaking in from his world, leaving him in doubt about what will happen next.
259	2a	"Bakugan Academy!"; Transliteration: "Bakugan Akademī" (Japanese: 爆丸アカデミー)	February 6, 2022 (CA); April 1, 2022 (US)	April 1, 2022
Benton reveals to the Awesome Brawlers that a strange occurrence is happening between Earth and Vestroia. The Elemental Energies from the faction realms have broken free from Vestroia and have already begun to erupt across the Earth worldwide, which explains why they were reunited with their original Bakugan partners in the first place, including Drago. Powerful forces from both worlds are already at work attempting to put an end to this situation for good and restore balance to both planets. He also reveals that Marlowe Faustus has built a school called the Bakugan Academy to train a new group of Elemental Brawlers that will handle any opposing forces willing to take advantage of this situation, which is why he has asked the AB to enroll at his school. Upon arrival, the AB are greeted by Faustus, the headmaster of the Bakugan Academy who gives them another tour of the facility while explaining that he created this school to provide intense training for Brawlers and their Bakugan in every environment so far. After meeting the gym teacher Coach Short, much to the AB's shock and disappointment, Faustus reveals that he invited them to join his Academy as students instead of teachers. Dan is soon confronted by Athena Monde who believes that he can't achieve Elemental Evolution for his Bakugan and is determined to prove herself the strongest Elemental Brawler there is. On Faustus's suggestion, Dan and Athena decide to have a battle against each other. In the midst of the battle, Athena summons an Elemental core which she uses on Blitz Fox as she summons her Nanogan called Scorcher. They nearly defeat Drago, but Dan, determined to not lose this battle, summons an Elemental core which he uses on Drago as he summons his Nanogan Fury who easily defeats Scorcher. Despite their comeback, Athena successfully defeats Dan. In the aftermath, Faustus suggests to Dan that he can learn Elemental Brawling as well if he agrees to be a student at the Bakugan Academy and study there; Dan happily agrees, as well as the other AB. This makes Faustus believe that their presence will motivate the other students to become stronger than ever, and improve on their Bakugan skills. In the end, Dan and the AB become determined to master evolution in no time.
260	2b	"Roommates"; Transliteration: "Rūmumeito" (Japanese: ルームメイト)	February 6, 2022 (CA); April 1, 2022 (US)	April 1, 2022
As the AB get settled into their dorm rooms, while also wondering who their roommates are going to be, Dan and Wynton, who have become roommates in their dorm room, end up driving each other crazy with their shenanigans, resulting in arguments towards each other, especially during a gym exercise in the form of a dodgeball game. As the last players standing, they decide to have a Baku-battle to settle the score, and most likely resolve their differences. In the midst of the battle, Drago summons Fury who overpowers Trox. Nearly defeated, Wynton advises Trox to connect with the elements of Earth by imagining them in his mind's eye as discussed in their recent class lesson, and as a result, Trox summons his Nanogan Sledge, giving Wynton a successful comeback. However, before he and Dan can finish their battle, Coach Short intervenes and defeats their Nanogan because class is over. In the aftermath, Dan and Wynton apologize to each other and decide to make amends, hoping that they can learn to get along from now on as roommates.
261	3a	"Lia and Riot!"; Transliteration: "Namaikina Rūmumeito" (Japanese: 生意気なルームメイト)	February 13, 2022 (CA); April 1, 2022 (US)	April 15, 2022
The AB discuss their issues with their roommates, including Lia who is having a hard time dealing with China Riot as her roommate. During class, they meet Chet Chipman, a spoiled rich kid who has enrolled at the Bakugan Academy to learn Elemental Brawling so that he can be a strong Brawler as well. However, he begins to tease Riot for her age and her lack of knowledge on Elemental Brawling, causing her to storm off, much to Lia's concern. Later, Lia comforts Riot and deduces that she's younger than her and everyone else at this school, and that she's just lonely and nervous. Riot explains that the reason she didn't take notes in class was because she thought it was easy for her, but Lia says otherwise. Chet approaches them and continues to tease Riot, but Lia criticizes him for being a bully and showing off all the time. She challenges him to a battle which he accepts after recruiting Chad to battle alongside him. In the midst of the battle, Warrior Whale summons his Nanogan Blade who overpowers Sectanoid. Before Chad can finish him off, Pegatrix manages to save him. Lia stands up for Riot and proclaims that she and Pegatrix will defend her and Sectanoid no matter what. With their emotional wavelength in sync now, Lia summons an elemental core which she uses on Pegatrix as she summons her Nanogan Chrysalin. Riot also summons an elemental core and summons her Nanogan Sludgem. Together, they successfully defeat Chet and Chad. In the aftermath, Professor K approaches Lia and Riot and congratulates them for using everything they've learned from class in a Bakugan battle, mainly Riot who now understands the concept of drawing out Elemental power. In the end, Lia and Riot become friends, and Lia offers to help her out with everything related to Elemental Brawling. All she has to do is ask; Riot happily agrees.
262	3b	"Lightning's Place"; Transliteration: "Jiyū no Tame ni" (Japanese: 自由の為に)	February 13, 2022 (CA); April 1, 2022 (US)	April 15, 2022
Athena discovers Lightning sleeping outside and reports this situation to Chief Maintenance and Sanitation Engineer Mr. Barnstaple who believes that he's breaking the rules because everyone is supposed to sleep in their dorm rooms. They confront Lightning where Mr. Barnstaple threatens to put him on house arrest for five days. This results in him and Athena chasing after Lightning and Howlkor as they attempt to capture them, but they manage to evade them. Having had enough of his mischief, Mr. Barnstaple challenges Lightning to a battle as stated in the Academy rules which he accepts; If Mr. Barnstaple wins, Lightning will be put on house arrest for five days and will be forced to sleep in his dorm room from now on, but if Lightning wins, he will have no choice but to allow him and Howlkor to sleep wherever they want. In the midst of the battle, Mr. Barnstaple reveals that the reason he makes the students follow the rules is because he wants them to be disciplined, safe, uninjured, and in top form because at some point, they will have to face the Elemental Storm. Lightning says that he's only at his best when he has freedom, prompting the AB to agree with him because the Elemental Storm has caused destruction everywhere. He intends to put an end to this event quickly so that he can go back to walking and sleeping wherever he pleases like he used to. In a surprising turn of events, Lightning summons an elemental core which he uses on Howlkor as he summons his Nanogan Shadow. Together, they successfully defeat Mr. Barnstaple, and as a result, he agrees to let Lightning and Howlkor sleep wherever they want. In the aftermath late at night, Athena brings Mr. Barnstaple to her dorm room where he discovers Lightning sleeping in his bed for once because he has come to understand how he feels and he wanted to show him a little respect, much to his surprise. It is also revealed that he is Athena's roommate, much to her dissatisfaction because as it turns out, she has a fear of dogs.
263	4a	"Let's Ace a Difficult Subject!"; Transliteration: "Sorezore no Kosei" (Japanese: それぞれの個性)	February 20, 2022 (CA); April 1, 2022 (US)	April 29, 2022
Shun and Ajit are having a hard time understanding the lessons taught from their teachers Miss Bliss and Omnivia Sykes. Ajit has to solve a strategy problem by tomorrow, but Shun accidentally does the work for him, and Ajit decides to take credit for it. However, the next day, Sykes reveals to him that she will now test him in a Bakugan Battle to see if he truly understands the battle strategy problem, much to his dismay. Miss Bliss also prepares to test Shun in a Bakugan Battle to see if he truly understands everything he learned in class so far, much to his dismay as well. During the battle exercise, Ajit seems to be struggling against Sykes because Shun's strategy that he's using isn't working at all. Sykes reveals to Ajit that she suspected that he didn't solve the problem on his own. Before she can fail him, Ajit admits that what he did was a mistake and asks her to give him a chance to redeem himself and pass this assignment if he wins this battle with his own strategy; Sykes reluctantly agrees. She summons an elemental core which she uses on Griswing as he summons his Nanogan Clutch. Luckily, Ajit makes a comeback using his own unconventional and freestyle strategy. He then summons an elemental core which he uses on Pharol as he summons his Nanogan Lancer. Together, they successfully defeat Sykes who agrees to give Ajit a passing grade. Meanwhile, Shun is struggling in his battle against Miss Bliss because he still doesn't understand everything he learned in class so far. However, upon remembering what Ajit told him about meditation that involves freeing his mind, Shun suddenly realizes that he's been overthinking a lot lately, and that the only way he can win is to battle without thinking. Shun, who now understands Miss Bliss's lesson from class, comes up with a strategy method where he and Hydorous use a battle style which confuses Miss Bliss. He ends up summoning an elemental core which he uses on Hydorous as he summons his Nanogan Riptide. Together, they successfully defeat Miss Bliss. In the aftermath, Shun and Ajit have come to understand the lessons that were taught to them by their teachers. Elsewhere, Dan and Lightning end up taking a make-up lesson as punishment for falling asleep in class the other day, much to their dismay.
264	4b	"A New Studio D is Born"; Transliteration: "Atarashī Sutajio D" (Japanese: 新しいスタジオD)	February 20, 2022 (CA); April 1, 2022 (US)	April 29, 2022
After being caught by Mr. Barnstaple for using the training field without permission, the AB, dissatisfied about the strict nature of the Academy, start to feel homesick because they miss Studio D. They soon discover an abandoned storage room after they follow Lightning there, which is the same size as their old Studio D. On Dan's suggestion, they decide to make this place the new Studio D, now dubbed as "Studio B." They start sneaking around the school collecting useful items while renovating the storage area. Following its completion, Athena catches the AB and threatens to report them to the Academy faculty. Dan and Athena decide to have a battle to settle this dispute; If Athena wins, the AB will be forced to leave the Academy for good, but if Dan wins, Athena will have to forget about what she saw tonight. In the midst of the battle, Athena, obsessed with becoming the best Brawler there is, summons an elemental core and successfully evolves Blitz Fox to Strength Mode as she overpowers Drago. Nearly defeated, Dan, who refuses to leave the Academy despite their strict rules and boring classes, and determined to get stronger along with Drago, summons an elemental core and successfully evolves Drago to Strength Mode, but despite their comeback, Athena successfully defeats Dan a second time after learning from Blitz Fox that Drago hasn't recovered from the damage he took, which has given them the advantage needed to win. In the aftermath, Faustus approaches Athena and asks her about what is going on here as he is concerned about it. Instead of reporting the AB's actions to him, Athena decides to cover for them and lies to Faustus about what they were doing, much to the AB's confusion. During a private conversation, Faustus confides in Athena about what is troubling her, and Athena tells him that she has come to realize that Dan has gotten stronger than before, yet she still doesn't understand how it happened, or how he does it. Faustus states that despite her high intelligence at the Academy, there are still more things for her to learn in the future in order to become stronger, yet Athena still doesn't understand it at all.
265	5a	"Magnus is Back!"; Transliteration: "Magunasu Sensei" (Japanese: マグナス先生)	February 27, 2022 (CA); April 1, 2022 (US)	May 13, 2022
Faustus informs the students that the damage caused by Elemental Energy Surges is increasing rapidly. Much to Dan's shock, he discovers Magnus at the Academy, and it is revealed that Faustus has hired him as a guest instructor to teach a new type of Elemental Evolution to the students. He chooses Dan as his opponent to carry out this demonstration despite Athena's objections, claiming that he is incapable of controlling his own power. In the midst of the demonstration, both Dan and Magnus seem to be evenly matched after evolving their Bakugan to Strength Mode. Their battle is soon interrupted by the presence of an Elemental Energy Surge that has been located near the Academy. Faustus sends Athena, Chet, Callie, and Magnus to deal with it, with the exception of the AB who still aren't ready to deal with Elemental Surges like this one. Upon arrival, the Brawlers attempt to defeat an Aquos Krakelios who has been corrupted by the Elemental Energy Surge, to no avail. Luckily, Magnus joins in and summons his Nanogan Widow for assistance. He then evolves Nillious to Speed Mode where he successfully defeats Krakelios, thus containing the Elemental Energy Surge. In the aftermath, Magnus explains what Speed Mode can do against high speed enemies, and since he is the one and only Brawler to have mastered this Evolution to begin with, this is the reason why Faustus invited him to teach at the Academy in the first place. Faustus then announces to the students that they will have to master Speed Mode as soon as possible.
266	5b	"Athena's Wish"; Transliteration: "Atena no Omoi" (Japanese: アテナの想い)	February 27, 2022 (CA); April 1, 2022 (US)	May 13, 2022
Dan and Athena attempt to achieve Speed Mode for their Bakugan partners, to no avail. This begins to upset Athena in the process. However, after many attempts, Dan successfully evolves Drago to Speed Mode. Before he can call it a day, Athena, having witnessed Drago's Speed Mode, challenges Dan to a battle which he reluctantly accepts. In the midst of the battle, Dan accidentally evolves Drago to Strength Mode while attempting to evolve him to Speed Mode, much to his complete shock. Athena begins to accuse Dan for making fun of her and starts to lose control of her emotions. When Dan asks her about why she is acting this way, Athena reveals that ever since she was little, she has succeeded in her studies, but she was always alone because of it and felt like an outcast because no one could understand her feelings at all. That's when she met Marlowe Faustus for the first time and became fascinated by his great knowledge. He told her that someday, she'll be able to assist him with her talent when the time comes. When an Elemental Storm first appeared and destroyed the school that she attended, Athena met Blitz Fox for the first time when she saved her from it. They decided to team up and become partners because both of them wanted to be strong enough to save the world from this monstrosity to begin with. That's when she decided to join the Bakugan Academy run by Faustus in order to become the best Brawler there is due to her sole purpose of saving the world no matter what it takes. Athena continues to spiral out of control emotionally after failing to evolve Blitz Fox to Speed Mode due to her obsession to become the number one Brawler at the Academy. Before she can finish Dan off, Magnus, having suspected that the Elemental Energy caused her to lose control of her emotions in the first place, intervenes and easily defeats her as she regains control of herself. He then warns the AB to be careful not to end up like Athena. In the aftermath, the AB go to check on Athena, and Lia tells her that they all want to get stronger just like her. She takes Athena to the arena as she witnesses Dan trying to achieve Speed Mode again, but is unsuccessful, which means that he and Drago still need to practice until they master this evolution for good. That's when Athena begins to realize that Dan didn't purposely refuse to use Speed Mode, prompting Lia to tell her that Dan has the same desires as her, which means they have a lot in common. In the end, Athena decides to join the AB in their training to master Speed Mode.
267	6a	"A Superstar Returns?!"; Transliteration: "Sutā wa Tsurai" (Japanese: スターはつらいよ)	March 6, 2022 (CA); April 1, 2022 (US)	May 27, 2022
The AB discover their old Studio D completely trashed, then they learn that Cubbo was responsible for this. He explains that he's hiding from an obsessed fan after he became famous from his viral videos that he's been creating every day. He also says that he received an email where they threatened to kidnap him. The AB decide to protect him and find out about the person who sent that email in the first place. Luckily, Ajit tells Shun that he has located a fan club in Los Volmos, and they decide to go undercover to investigate it. They visit the Cubheads Clubhouse where they meet its club president Jean who, believing that they're Cubbo fans as well, welcomes them with open arms. During their time at the club, Shun and Ajit discover Cubbo here after he escaped Studio D to watch the Cubbo Pledge. They attempt to hide him from all the fans in order to avoid a riot, but Shun accidentally drops his Tumpee keychain, and Jean discovers that Shun is a big Tumpee fan, rather than a Cubbo fan. Upset that he lied about being a Cubbo fan, Jean challenges Shun to a battle where he will have to give up being a Tumpee fan, and go on to being a Cubbo fan if she wins; Shun reluctantly accepts. Jean easily overpowers him due to her love for Cubbo. However, Shun's love for Tumpee gives him an elemental core which he uses to evolve Hydorous to Strength Mode where he easily defeats Jean. In the aftermath, the AB locate Cubbo and deduce that Jean sent that email in the first place. Jean reveals that Cubbo asked her to send it to him because she wanted an autograph in return, and he wanted more viewers for his channel. This results in the AB sending Lightning to chase after Cubbo as payback for manipulating them in the first place.
268	6b	"The Gate Crushers"; Transliteration: "Gēto Kurasshāzu" (Japanese: ゲートクラッシャーズ)	March 6, 2022 (CA); April 1, 2022 (US)	May 27, 2022
Kravitz informs the AB that the "Gate Crushers", a group of former AAAnimus employees, are attempting to close the Elemental holes by force. In the beginning, AAAnimus agreed with Benton's proposal to be extra cautious when dealing with the Elemental holes. However, one of her subordinates named Wagner disagreed with the proposal and resigned from AAAnimus in protest, taking along other employees who agreed with his ideas. That's how the Gate Crushers were formed. Kravitz soon leaves after receiving word that AAAnimus has located their base and forbids the AB from getting involved. The Security Force infiltrates the Gate Crusher's base, but find it completely empty, having left earlier before they arrived. They soon realize this was all a diversion. Meanwhile, Benton continues to monitor the Elemental holes. However, the Gate Crushers infiltrate the facility and take everyone hostage, Benton included. Wagner attempts to close the Elemental holes by force despite Benton's warning; although successful, a much bigger Elemental hole suddenly appears and starts to leak near the facility, prompting Wagner to continue his attempt to shut it down. Unbeknownst to him, Benton attempts to send a video message for help. Meanwhile, the AB travel to the facility and discover the video message from Benton where they discover him and the staff being held captive by the Gate Crushers led by Wagner. Upon arrival, they battle the out-of-control Bakugan while Wynton makes his way through the facility in search of Benton. Luckily, he manages to locate the control room and frees Benton as they attempt to persuade Wagner to work together to stop the Elemental hole. Using their combined knowledge, they successfully stop the Elemental hole while the AB successfully defeat the Bakugan. Unbeknownst to everyone, Wagner escapes with the data on the Elemental holes which he plans to use to not only close all of them by force, but to also sever the connection between Earth and Vestroia as well.
269	7a	"Lia and Athena"; Transliteration: "Onegai! Atena Sensei" (Japanese: お願い！アテナ先生)	March 13, 2022 (CA); April 1, 2022 (US)	June 10, 2022
The AB discover that most of the students have nearly mastered both modes of evolution, and it is revealed that Athena has been teaching them to do so because Faustus told her to. She offers to teach the AB how to master these evolutions as well, which includes Speed Mode, but a jealous Dan decides to teach them instead, which proves to be a failure. Later, Lia asks Athena to teach her how to evolve into Strength Mode to start off with, and Athena happily agrees. However, she begins to have a hard time attempting to achieve an elemental core. She and Pegatrix explain to Athena that an unknown person is teaching people how to use Elemental Bakugan, which may prove to be another threat in the future besides the Elemental Storm, which is why she wants to master Strength Mode as soon as possible in order to protect everything she loves. Later, the AB arrive and discover Lia training with Athena as she successfully achieves Strength Mode for Pegatrix. Dan becomes jealous of Athena's offer to train the other AB to master both modes of evolution, and Athena calls Dan out for his stubborn behavior. As a result, he challenges her to a battle for the position of teaching Lia how to master evolution which she accepts; If Athena wins, Dan will be forced to never interfere in their training again. In the midst of the battle, Athena evolves Blitz Fox to Speed Mode while Dan accidentally evolves Drago to Strength Mode in his attempt to achieve Speed Mode. That's when the AB deduce that Dan is getting the opposite mode from the one that he calls out. Athena successfully defeats Dan, again, which means that he must honor the bet. He then storms off, still determined to master both Strength and Speed Mode, and possibly get back at Athena, no matter what it takes.
270	7b	"Field Training"; Transliteration: "Jitchi Kunren" (Japanese: 実地訓練)	March 13, 2022 (CA); April 1, 2022 (US)	June 10, 2022
The students and staff, including Lia, are preparing for a mission to deal with a rogue Bakugan that is running wild in Los Volmos, and it is revealed that Athena is bringing Lia along on the mission so that she can gain some experience in the field. Arriving at the location of the Elemental Energy Surge, Lia and Athena battle the rogue Bakugan who is proven to be too strong for them. More than that, it begins to corrupt its Brawler with the Elemental Energy as well. The AB soon arrive to watch the battle unfold. Realizing that the rogue Bakugan is too strong for the students to deal with, Faustus summons his Bakugan Wrath who gains the upper hand with his Nanogan Echo, his Strength Mode, and his Speed Mode, nearly defeating it in the process. Two elemental cores suddenly appear which Lia and Athena use to evolve their Bakugan to Speed Mode. Together, they successfully defeat the rogue Bakugan, thus freeing the Brawler from the Elemental Energy corruption, and containing the Surge.
271	8a	"Drago vs. Falcron!"; Transliteration: "Farukuron to no Saikai" (Japanese: ファルクロンとの再会)	March 20, 2022 (CA); April 1, 2022 (US)	June 24, 2022
During a field trip to Vestroia, the AB, Athena, and HB (Hamilton Bomburg) end up in an unfamiliar area (it's really Ventana) where the AB at first believe that they only came on this field trip to learn more about gateways as explained by HB himself (I think it was just an excuse for him to come to Vestroia). The gang soon encounter Crystal Blue who reveals that Elemental Energy is interfering with the gates. They are soon attacked by Venus flytraps but are surprisingly saved by Falcron. Their reunion is cut short when a couple of Bakugan from an inhabited village appear and take everyone captive. The Elder, revealed to be a Serpillious, explains that the Elemental Energy has caused the plants to become violent, attacking anyone who comes near them. He suspects that the AB's (and Athena's) Bakugan were the cause of the Elemental Surges since they possess Elemental powers as well. Drago attempts to explain to the villagers that he is a member of the Supreme Bakugan Council, but they don't believe him. He breaks free and states that he can control the Elemental power that he possesses. Intrigued, Falcron manages to convince The Elder to allow them to have a Baku-battle to settle the dispute. Drago and Falcron begin their battle, but about halfway through, Wynton, who is suspicious, stops it and deduces that Falcron initiated this battle far away from the village in order to free the AB and stall for time. Following his confirmation, Fenneca soon arrives and shows the villagers the message from the Supreme Council which proves that Drago was telling the truth this whole time, especially about his mission to stop the Elemental Surges, and it is revealed that Falcron informed the Council earlier than anticipated. As the gang prepare to return to Earth, Wynton shares a heartfelt moment with his former partner, and Fenneca explains to Lia that the Elemental Storms are causing chaos throughout Vestroia, while also advising Drago to continue his attempt to stop the phenomenon back on Earth for good.
272	8b	"Watch Out for Our Rivals"; Transliteration: "Raibaru-kō ni Goyōshin" (Japanese: ライバル校にご用心)	March 20, 2022 (CA); April 1, 2022 (US)	June 24, 2022
Wynton is searching for information on the Elemental Asylum that was mentioned by Jean earlier. He and Ajit soon come across an advertisement where Huxley Faber, the president of a school that he's running called "Huxley's Bakuversity," is offering to teach students how to achieve Elemental Energy for their Bakugan. Wynton and Ajit go to investigate the school during their undercover mission and discover that it's actually an old abandoned farmhouse. They meet one of the students named George who offers to show them around the school. During class, Wynton and Ajit call out Huxley for his unconventional methods of achieving Elemental Energy, believing it to be a scam, but Huxley decides to prove it with a demonstration. He uses his "Huxley Method" to get his Bakugan to evolve, but still, Ajit and Wynton don't believe that his method will work because it's nothing but a scam. This results in a Baku-battle between them, Huxley, and George. Meanwhile, Lightning, who has infiltrated the school, discovers a holographic projector that they've been using to make it look like their Bakugan have Elementally evolved and unplugs it, thus exposing Huxley's scam. Feeling deceived, the remaining students angrily chase after Huxley and George who was also in on the scam as well.
273	9a	"New Heroes Appear?!"; Transliteration: "Hontō no Hīrō" (Japanese: 本当のヒーロー)	March 27, 2022 (CA); April 1, 2022 (US)	July 8, 2022
Kravitz asks Dan and Wynton to deal with a group of Brawlers that have been causing trouble in Los Volmos. They begin their search at the park and manage to locate the troublemakers called "The Masters of Disaster," consisting of Masters Blue (Richie), Red (Eric), and Green (Sharon). Meeting with Dan and Wynton, the trio explain that they became inspired to become heroes like the AB and "keep the peace around Los Volmos"; in reality, they're just causing trouble. They continue their shenanigans around the city until Dan and Wynton confront them again, and the former rebukes them for their selfish acts of heroism, causing them to run off. Later, "The Masters of Disaster" come across a group of thieves attempting to rob a vault with their Bakugan. They attempt to stop them, but they inadvertently release an Elemental Energy Surge which starts to corrupt Grizzly, making him even stronger than before. Despite their best efforts, he easily defeats the trio. Dan and Wynton soon arrive to battle the out-of-control Bakugan. Despite a rocky start, they emerge victorious. Following the thieves arrest, "The Masters of Disaster" admit their wrongdoings, and although it looks like they've learned their lesson, seeing Drago's Strength Mode has inspired them to learn that too as they prepare to return to their acts of heroism sooner or later, not learning anything in the process.
274	9b	"Dan vs. Mr. Magnus"; Transliteration: "Magunasu no Jugyō" (Japanese: マグナスの授業)	March 27, 2022 (CA); April 1, 2022 (US)	July 8, 2022
Dan continues his attempts to achieve Speed Mode, but is unsuccessful. Magnus soon shows up and challenges Dan to a battle which he accepts. He starts off by evolving Nillious to Speed Mode and overpowers Drago, nearly defeating him in the process, all while taunting Dan for being the joke of the Academy. In a turn of events, Shun begins to realize the reason why Dan was unable to achieve Speed Mode in the first place; Magnus and Athena's words have affected his battle performance, causing him to lose focus because he was worried about the other Brawlers getting further than him, which is why he got held back from trying to achieve his true strength. He advises Dan to focus only on the battle, and not think about anything else. With some encouragement from Drago, Dan, who now understands what they were talking about, summons an elemental core and successfully evolves the former to Speed Mode as he makes a comeback and nearly defeats Nillious. Magnus decides to end the battle and advises Dan to continue his training before announcing to everyone that he's leaving the Academy today. Before leaving, he tells Dan that the Academy is hiding some sort of secret and advises him to not drop his guard, much to Dan's confusion.
275	10a	"The Mysterious Marauder"; Transliteration: "Sugata naki Shūgekisha" (Japanese: 姿なき襲撃者)	April 3, 2022 (CA); April 1, 2022 (US)	July 22, 2022
Masato contacts Shun and reveals that the Gate Card Production Plant at Kazami International Holdings has been under attack for a month now by Janssen Tech, a rival company that grew rapidly after developing their own Gate Card System. He asks him to investigate this incident and find out the truth behind these attacks. Toshi takes Shun to the site of the attack that happened last night, and Hydorous suspects that the damage was caused by a Bakugan. Shun reviews the security camera footage after picking up a Bakugan signal from Wynton's Baku-Radar app and discovers an unseen presence attacking the factory from within. He continues to follow the radar signal in an attempt to catch the intruder. He eventually spots the source and attacks it, revealed to be a Bakugan using some kind of camouflage, as well as its Brawler. In the midst of the battle, the Brawler uses a device to shield Maxodon from Hydorous's attacks. Shun evolves him to Strength Mode, but he still fails to break through the shield. While thinking of a way to break through the Tusk Guard shield, Shun realizes that the only way to do so is to attack after it is lowered. Determined to protect his company, Shun summons an elemental core, evolves Hydorous to Speed Mode, and successfully defeats the Brawler. In the aftermath, it is revealed that the Brawler that attacked Kazami International Holdings is an employee who works for Sun 17 Security, a security company owned by Janssen Tech. Masato decides to continue the investigation, knowing that this company still intends to cripple Kazami International Holdings, no matter what it takes.
276	10b	"Suspicious Hackett"; Transliteration: "Ayashī Haketto" (Japanese: 怪しいハケット)	April 3, 2022 (CA); April 1, 2022 (US)	July 22, 2022
Ajit and Pharol discover Jenny Hackett nearby as they overhear her talking about some invention that she plans to use to gain legendary power. She soon vanishes before they can attempt to follow her. Ajit tells the AB about what he heard from Jenny, believing that she's planning something dangerous like she did before, but they start to doubt that it's true, so he decides to go back out there and collect proof that she's up to something sinister. Ajit and Pharol start following her around town as she starts collecting items from different places before arriving at the Bakugan Academy. He confronts Jenny, intending to stop her from causing any more trouble. This leads to an ensuing Bakugan Battle where Jenny nearly defeats him. Dan and Wynton soon arrive, and Ajit shows them the proof, provoking them to join in on the battle. Before they can finish her off, a provoked Faustus intervenes and defeats all three of them. Crystal Blue soon appears and manages to clear up the misunderstanding by revealing that Jenny was making the invention for her, revealed to be a high-capacity battery for her smartphone. More than that, the latter tells Ajit about what she said earlier; she was actually referring to a mobile game that she was playing recently. That's why Crystal Blue asked her to make the battery for her, which holds unlimited capacity. Furthermore, it is also revealed that they've enrolled at the Bakugan Academy, much to Dan, Wynton, and Ajit's dismay.
277	11a	"The Bakuganist is Back"; Transliteration: "Bakuganisuto, Futatabi" (Japanese: バクガニスト、再び)	April 17, 2022 (CA); April 1, 2022 (US)	August 5, 2022
Miss Bliss takes the Brawlers to a festival called Baku-Palooza and reveals that they will be participating in a three-on-three exhibition brawl. However, before they can begin, Sophie, having created a new Bakugan Preservation Society, interrupts it and continues her nonsense belief that Bakugan should be "liberated" from humans. Dan tries but fails to convince the Brawlers who teamed up with Sophie that Bakugan are not being mistreated by humans. In a shocking turn of events, Miss Bliss, who is interested in Sophie's idea that Bakugan should be in their natural state, proposes that the Bakugan will battle without their partners. In the midst of the battle, Drago asks Gorthion if he believes that Bakugan bonding with humans isn't necessary. Gorthion responds that living freely is the only way Bakugan can battle like this, as long as they stick with Sophie. However, Drago attempts to convince him that battling with a human will be even more fun. After thinking it over, Gorthion asks his partner if he wants to battle with him, thinking that it will be even more fun, and he happily agrees, prompting the other Brawlers to join in as well, leaving Sophie totally provoked. Miss Bliss eventually realizes that Sophie was wrong in the first place because in truth, she doesn't understand what Bakugan need the most. In the end, the rest of the Brawlers decide to join in on the battle, knowing that it's more fun that way.
278	11b	"Trox Evolution!"; Transliteration: "Turokkusu no Chō Shinka" (Japanese: トゥロックスの超進化)	April 17, 2022 (CA); April 1, 2022 (US)	August 5, 2022
Wynton is training with Athena in an attempt to get Trox to evolve. Luckily, he summons an elemental core and successfully evolves him to Strength Mode before calling it a day. Lia suggests to Wynton that they should sign up for a school-wide battle class which ties into combat training that involves battling different opponents. Intrigued about it, Wynton decides to sign up. The next day, Wynton prepares to battle Chad. They start off by evolving their partners to Strength Mode, but in the midst of the battle, Chad switches to Speed Mode, which Wynton hasn't mastered yet. He nearly defeats him, but Dan and Athena encourage him to not give up and find a way to fight back even in Strength Mode. Inspired by their words, Wynton makes a successful comeback. He then evolves Trox to Speed Mode and successfully defeats Chad. In the aftermath, Athena, having been invited by Wynton personally, prepares to tell the AB about the mysterious person who is teaching people how to make their Bakugan Elementally evolve. She suspects that it's Magnus, but Dan refuses to believe her because Magnus would never do such a thing like that. He soon leaves to find Magnus in order to prove that he's innocent.
279	12a	"A New Power Nano-Gear"; Transliteration: "Nanogia no Chikara" (Japanese: ナノギアの力)	April 24, 2022 (CA); April 1, 2022 (US)	August 19, 2022
Dan prepares to look for Magnus in order to prove Athena wrong, only to be spotted by Faustus. Dan tells him about the person he's looking for who is teaching Brawlers how to Elementally evolve their Bakugan. Faustus reveals that he is already doing the same thing as well, having sent the teachers to investigate suspicious locations as we speak. Sykes sends in her report finding nothing, but secretly discovers something else. Faustus suspects that the only location left is the abandoned factory where a recent Elemental Storm Surge took place. Dan and Drago sneak off and arrive at the factory, intending to find and catch the person responsible for teaching Brawlers how to Elementally evolve their Bakugan. Much to their shock, they discover Magnus offering to teach a group of adult Brawlers how to Elementally evolve their Bakugan. Dan confronts him, but is surrounded by the Brawlers, leading to an ensuing Bakugan battle where Drago is completely outnumbered. Luckily, Magnus saves him. The Brawlers soon realize that Magnus tricked them. He reveals that he pretended that he wanted to learn how to Elementally evolve in order to get information out of these Brawlers. Dan and Magnus team up to deal with the rest of the Brawlers, but they use the crystals to Elementally evolve their Bakugan which start to act on their own. Magnus decides to show off his new power called Nano-Gear as he combines Widow with Nillious and successfully defeats the remaining Brawlers. In the aftermath, Magnus and Dan interrogate the Brawlers about where they got those crystals from, but they claim to not know anything, except that it was all arranged through a website. The only thing that they remember is an unknown person giving them the crystals, revealing that he is from the Bakugan Academy. Magnus explains that he joined the Bakugan Academy as a teacher in order to go undercover and investigate the Academy from the inside, but he wasn't able to find any concrete evidence, which is why he left the Academy. With the Elemental rampages spreading even faster, he needed to expand his investigation. He advises Dan to investigate the Academy along with his friends and find the person behind this monstrosity before heading to AAAnimus to drop off the adult Brawlers.
280	12b	"Who's The Real Culprit?!"; Transliteration: "Shinhannin o Oe" (Japanese: 真犯人を追え)	April 24, 2022 (CA); April 1, 2022 (US)	August 19, 2022
Dan informs the AB that Magnus is not the person responsible for teaching other Brawlers how to Elementally evolve their Bakugan and reveals that the culprit is someone at the Academy. They decide to investigate everyone there and prove their innocence, which includes the students and the teachers. Lia and Shun set their sights on Miss Bliss, Wynton and Lightning set their sights on Jenny, and Dan and Ajit set their sights on Athena before Dan switches his focus to Sykes. He sneaks into her classroom, only to be caught and forced to battle her as a result. Meanwhile, Jenny shows Wynton her research laboratory where she has been trying to find a way to stabilize and collect Elemental Energy which can be used to hold back the Elemental Storms as ordered by Marlowe Faustus. Fascinated with Jenny's research, Wynton decides to help her out. Meanwhile, Ajit and Pharol are caught by Athena. In order to keep suspicion off of themselves, and most likely her, he challenges Athena to a battle because he never had the chance to battle her; Athena reluctantly accepts. Due to his belief that battles are fun, Ajit successfully evolves Pharol to Strength Mode, and then to Speed Mode, but despite their best efforts, Athena successfully defeats Ajit. However, Pharol accidentally reveals their investigation, and Ajit has no choice but to confess. In the meantime, Dan loses to Sykes who found out that he went to the abandoned factory alone. She reveals that she found a cufflink at the crime scene. Athena becomes shocked when she recognizes it and reveals that it belongs to none other than Marlowe Faustus.
281	13a	"Faustus' Secret Revealed"; Transliteration: "Fausuto no Himitsu" (Japanese: ファウストの秘密)	May 1, 2022 (CA); April 1, 2022 (US)	September 2, 2022
Everyone is shocked when the AB, Athena, and Sykes learn that Marlowe Faustus was responsible for giving the Elemental Crystals to many outside Brawlers in the first place. Athena refuses to accept the truth about Faustus, and Sykes decides to go to AAAnimus and fill them in on the situation in person because she believes that the communications network at the Academy is being monitored. Back at Studio D, Athena continues to cope with the truth about Faustus, so Dan suggests that they investigate further just like he did with Magnus. They sneak into his office in an attempt to find a clue, until Athena discovers a secret safe. In that safe, the AB and Athena discover an ignition key and a USB stick. They then return to Studio D where they discover a video file on that USB stick. In that file, in a shocking turn of events, the AB and Athena discover Faustus's true nature, and his villainous plan. Meanwhile, Wynton confronts Jenny and reveals that Faustus has been collecting Elemental Energy which he plans to unleash at a dangerous level, which means that he plans to use her research for evil. Upset about this revelation, the Elemental Energy starts to corrupt Jenny emotionally, knocking out Wynton in the process. Lightning prepares to battle her, intending to repay her after she decided to feed him when he was hungry. He starts off by evolving Howlkor to Strength Mode, and then to Speed Mode, intending to free Jenny by smashing the machine that's corrupting her with the Elemental Energy. Howlkor does so, and he successfully defeats Jenny, thus freeing her from the Elemental Energy corruption. In the meantime, the AB and Athena wait for Wynton and Lightning's return, until Faustus contacts Dan and demands the return of his ignition key, having taken Wynton, Lightning, and Jenny captive; in reality, he wants Athena to return it to him, much to everyone else's shock.
282	13b	"Clash! Dan vs. Athena"; Transliteration: "Nakama to Tomoni" (Japanese: 仲間と共に)	May 1, 2022 (CA); April 1, 2022 (US)	September 2, 2022
Faustus tells Athena to meet him at the observatory with the ignition key. Athena, desperate to find out the truth, takes the key and heads for the observatory, only to be stopped by the AB who offer to accompany her due to the danger she might get herself in, but she refuses because she would rather do this alone. Dan decides to challenge Athena to a battle in order to settle this dispute which she accepts; If Dan wins, she'll have to let the AB go with her, but if he loses, they'll let her go alone. The battle begins as Dan and Athena go all out with their evolutions and their Nanogan. However, due to Dan's determination to learn and grow stronger alongside his friends since they're a team that saved the world many times in the past by working together, which has become an inspiration for them, he finally defeats Athena. Having realized that all of the AB have gotten even stronger than before, Athena decides to accept their help with stopping Faustus. She soon arrives at the observatory and confronts him, intending to stop him for good.
283	14a	"Truth"; Transliteration: "Fausuto to Rāsu" (Japanese: ファウストとラース)	May 8, 2022 (CA); April 1, 2022 (US)	September 16, 2022
Athena confronts Faustus who is unaware that the AB are nearby, but they are soon caught by Wrath all of a sudden. When Athena asks Faustus about what his plan is, Faustus, after taking the key from her, explains that he used to be a scientist who attempted to find a way for adults to communicate with Bakugan. He scoured the web in search of more knowledge, until he discovered illegal information on gate technology, as well as a damaged gate device and started collecting it. He was able to repair the device with the data, which resulted in him opening up a gateway to Vestroia, in the realm of Haora where he met Wrath. Since then, he has learned everything about Vestroia from him, including the Elemental Energy produced by the crystals which he plans to use so that everyone in the world will be able to understand Bakugan. Faustus reveals that he built an Elemental Inductor capable of collecting Elemental Energy. He intended to gather a small amount of energy at first, but due to a miscalculation, the system overloaded and unleashed waves of Elemental Energy across the entire planet, which means that he was responsible for causing the Elemental Storm in the first place. Faustus reveals that the reason he kept the truth from everyone was because he didn't want to reveal his true nature from within, until now. He plans to conquer the Earth alongside Wrath. Suddenly, Magnus arrives to battle him, prompting the AB and Athena to join in as well. Despite their best efforts, they are still no match for Wrath. In a turn of events, Wrath reveals that he gave Faustus the idea to build an Elemental Inductor, which will enable him to gain Elemental Energy; therefore, he was using him all along. Following the overload, Wrath told Faustus that he intends to absorb the excess Elemental Energy, which will make him even stronger than ever. Faustus soon realized his true nature and held an intention to tell everyone the truth, and find a way to stop the Elemental power for good, but that didn't happen because he was most likely taken over by his evil self. Wrath plans to absorb the Elemental Energy which will make him powerful enough to rule both Earth and Vestroia. Magnus reveals that the rising number of Bakugan that became Elemental has brought an increase to the amount of Elemental Energy produced. He deduces that Faustus orchestrated all this in order to gather enough energy from the Academy students for Wrath to absorb. Faustus activates the Inductor which starts to gather all the Elemental Energy Surges as Wrath begins absorbing them.
284	14b	"The Battle With Wrath"; Transliteration: "Kienai Yakusoku" (Japanese: 消えない約束)	May 8, 2022 (CA); April 1, 2022 (US)	September 16, 2022
Wrath begins absorbing the Elemental Energy Surges from the Inductor. The Brawlers attempt to stop him before the process is complete, as well as destroying the machine, to no avail. Luckily, Ajit frees Wynton, Lightning, and Jenny, takes the ignition key, and attempts to escape along with the remaining Brawlers. Despite severing Wrath's link to the Inductor, he still has enough power to take them down. Before he can finish off the Brawlers, the teachers arrive to assist them while Lia attempts to explain that Faustus has been affected by the Elemental Energy. They decide to join in on the fight as well, but Wrath easily defeats them, along with the teachers. He prepares to destroy the Academy, but in a shocking turn of events, a bunch of elemental cores suddenly appear near the Brawlers and the teachers. Dan, Magnus, and Athena rally together and continue to battle Wrath with their evolutions and their Nanogan, with Dan and Athena summoning their Nano-Gear, in which Dan successfully defeats Wrath, thus freeing Faustus from the Elemental Energy. Much to everyone's shock, they soon discover that Wrath has disappeared without a trace, leaving Dan wondering what will happen next.
285	15a	"Rebuilding the Academy"; Transliteration: "Atarashī Gakuen-chō" (Japanese: 新しい学園長)	May 15, 2022 (CA); September 1, 2022 (US)	September 30, 2022
Following Wrath's defeat, the AB discuss the events that have occurred, following the fact that Marlowe Faustus caused the Elemental Storm in the first place, which caused many students to drop out of the Academy to begin with. Athena arrives and informs the AB that Faustus has made a full recovery, and that they should focus on training and rebuilding the Academy. The next day, much to their complete shock, Dan and Wynton soon learn that Coach Short has taken Faustus's place as the new Headmaster of the Academy as he begins to enforce a strict environment around the school through harsh training and severe punishments towards the students, mainly Dan. The rest of the AB also become dissatisfied with his teaching methods as well. They also learn that the other teachers are really busy looking for a new way to fund the Bakugan Academy in order to prevent it from closing because everyone has been criticizing it for being the cause of the Elemental Storm to begin with. Suddenly, Athena discovers an Elemental Bakugan running wild at a railyard in Los Volmos. Coach Short selects her, Lia, and Shun to deal with it despite Dan wanting to go as well. Upon arrival, the Brawlers attempt to defeat the Bakugan, to no avail. Dan, having snuck off regardless, arrives to assist them where he successfully defeats the Elemental Bakugan, thus containing the Elemental Surge. Despite their victory, Coach Short still punishes Dan for disobeying his orders.
286	15b	"The Great Prank War"; Transliteration: "Itazura Dai Sensō" (Japanese: イタズラ大戦争)	May 15, 2022 (CA); September 1, 2022 (US)	September 30, 2022
Having had enough of Coach Short's strict teaching methods of running the Bakugan Academy as the new Headmaster, Dan and Wynton decide to pull a series of pranks on him. They start pulling pranks on him, infuriating Coach Short in the process who eventually finds out that they were behind all of this. Wynton and Dan then decide to pull off an even greater prank on Coach Short that involves putting soap in his coffee maker, which will make his office fill up with soap suds. After setting up the prank, they wait for Coach Short to return, but it backfires when they discover him with an investor who is planning to make a donation to the Bakugan Academy. Dan and Wynton try but fail to stop the prank set up by them. Upset for getting caught in the crossfire of the prank, the investor decides to revoke his offer to fund the Academy, but Dan and Wynton apologize and beg him to reconsider. He decides to challenge them to a Baku-battle where if they win, he will make his donation to the Academy; Dan and Wynton accept. As the battle begins, the investors Bakugan runs away as Dan, Wynton, and their Bakugan chase after it, only to get caught up in a series of pranks, which happen to be their own. They eventually find out that Coach Short and the investor have been using their own pranks against them in order to get back at them for the pranks that they pulled on them, mainly Coach Short. Furthermore, the investor has decided to actually fund the Academy, so there's no need to battle anymore. However, Dan and Wynton refuse to let it end like this, so Wynton easily defeats the investor. In the aftermath, as payback for being the victim of Dan and Wynton's pranks, Coach Short tells them that he plans to make their training day tomorrow even more harder than before, much to their dissatisfaction.
287	16a	"A Perfect Marriage"; Transliteration: "Piza-Ya O Sukue" (Japanese: ピザ屋を救え)	May 22, 2022 (CA); September 1, 2022 (US)	October 14, 2022
Shun and Ajit are hanging out at their favorite pizza joint run by its owner Lou. One day, a group of employees from Janssen Tech arrive and threaten Lou, only to be stopped by Shun and Ajit who then leave, vowing to return with their boss. Lou begins to explain that Janssen Tech, along with Sun 17 Security is trying to force business owners in this area to sell their property to them in order to build a facility there, which includes his pizza joint which he inherited from his father. Suddenly, the employee's return with their boss, revealed to be McQ who happens to be the president of Sun 17 Security. He plans to destroy the pizza joint, leading to an ensuing Bakugan battle between him and Shun and Ajit. As the battle begins, McQ starts using a set of drones called Gravity Goggles to his advantage. Despite evolving their Bakugan to Strength Mode, it is still not enough to defeat McQ. Upon discovering that Lou is preparing to sell the pizza joint, Shun and Ajit, determined to not let his restaurant be destroyed by McQ, manage to disable the drones before successfully defeating McQ who is then arrested while swearing revenge on them. Furthermore, Lou tells Shun and Ajit that their Baku-battle has inspired him to start protecting his restaurant on his own. The next day, Shun and Ajit watch a news report where Janssen Tech has decided to cancel their land buying proposal after many residents rallied together and started protesting against them because they're worried that it will ruin their reputation, much to their delight.
288	16b	"Judge's Rule"; Transliteration: "Misutā Jajji Pādon" (Japanese: Mr.ジャッジはご勘弁)	May 22, 2022 (CA); September 1, 2022 (US)	October 14, 2022
After getting injured in the process during an altercation between Lightning and Mr. Barnstaple who was chasing him all over the Academy, Coach Short angrily fires the latter and reveals that he is replacing him with someone else. The next day, he introduces the students to the new Chief Maintenance and Sanitation Engineer Mister Judge as he begins to enforce strict regulations and hard tasks on the students, much to their dissatisfaction. This begins to affect Mr. Barnstaple who is not satisfied with his actions around the Academy, and his strict methods of how he treats the students here. Lightning soon approaches him and proposes that they team up to get rid of Mister Judge once and for all; Mr. Barnstaple reluctantly agrees. Lightning confronts Mister Judge and challenges him to a battle which he accepts; If he wins, he'll have to leave the Bakugan Academy for good, but if Mister Judge wins, he will punish him severely. However, before he can put the Drome up, Lightning and Howlkor run away as he starts to chase them all over the Academy. Coach Short attempts to order Mister Judge to stop battling after learning from Mr. Barnstaple that the Drome isn't set up, but due to his stubbornness, he refuses to do so because he is determined to finish this battle and win. After leading Mister Judge outside the campus, Lightning tricks him into destroying Coach Short's truck by accident and successfully defeats him in battle. As a result, Coach Short angrily fires Mister Judge for his reckless actions and stubborn behavior. In the aftermath, the students manage to convince Coach Short to reinstate Mr. Barnstaple, and he reluctantly agrees. In the end, Mr. Barnstaple thanks Lightning for getting his job back, and they decide to make amends.
289	17a	"The Gate Crushers Return"; Transliteration: "Gētokurasshāzu no Nerai" (Japanese: ゲートクラッシャーズの狙い)	May 29, 2022 (CA); September 1, 2022 (US)	October 28, 2022
Wagner and the Gate Crushers infiltrate an area with an Elemental hole and successfully close it by force using contraptions from Dusk Industries before making their escape, intending to sever the connection between Earth and Vestroia. The next day, Benton summons the AB and explains that the Gate Crushers are planning to sever the connection between Earth and Vestroia by using whatever means necessary to close all the Elemental holes by force, thinking that it will bring peace to the two planets to begin with. Knowing that Vestroia is in danger because of the Elemental Storm, the AB become determined to stop the Gate Crushers no matter what. Benton takes them to a warehouse where an Elemental hole has formed. However, unbeknownst to them, the Gate Crushers have already infiltrated the warehouse and have taken out the AAAnimus Security team who were guarding it from the start. As they set up the contraption while waiting for the process to charge, Wagner receives word that the AB and Benton have arrived. After landing near the warehouse, the AB and Benton confront Wagner, intending to stop him from closing the Elemental hole by force. This leads to an ensuing Bakugan battle; however, the Gate Crushers manage to prevent most of the AB from joining the battle, which means that it's up to Dan and Ajit to stop them once and for all. Despite using Non-Elemental Bakugan, Dan and Ajit seem to be winning, but Shun begins to suspect that something is not right after discovering the Gate Crushers battling pointlessly. Dan and Ajit manage to defeat most of the Gate Crushers, but in a shocking turn of events, the contraption begins to activate as it successfully closes the Elemental hole, and it is revealed that Wagner was just stalling for time. As the Gate Crushers prepare to disappear, Wagner reveals to Dan that he doesn't care about the existence of Bakugan, nor does he care about what will happen to them, even if he achieves his goal. After disappearing, Dan and the AB become determined to stop Wagner and the Gate Crushers from separating Earth and Vestroia, no matter the cost.
290	17b	"Team Short VS. Team Cubbo"; Transliteration: "Kabū ga Gakkō ni Yattekita" (Japanese: カブーが学校にやってきた)	May 29, 2022 (CA); September 1, 2022 (US)	October 28, 2022
Cubbo unexpectedly arrives at the Bakugan Academy to do a livestream there for his video channel. He explains to Coach Short that Marlowe Faustus asked him to come do a show here at the Bakugan Academy as a way to gain more viewers, and boost the students morale to begin with. Coach Short refuses to allow Cubbo to do the livestream at first, but Athena argues against him. Cubbo decides to settle this dispute with a contest between him and Short; if Cubbo wins, he gets to do his show here, but if he loses, he'll agree to advertise the Academy on his channel for free as a way to bring in more students in the process. Although reluctant at first, Coach Short eventually agrees with his terms of the contest. It turns out that the contest is a Bakugan version of capture the flag where the goal is to capture the flag from the captain of the opposing team. The game begins as Cubbo starts monitoring the actions of Team Cubbo (consisting of Athena, Dan, Wynton, Lia, and Lightning) and Team Short (consisting of Coach Short, Professor K, HB, Miss Bliss, and Omnivia Sykes). During the game, the teachers manage to defeat two of the AB. However, Athena already has a plan in motion that will ensure victory for them. She and Dan start making fun of Coach Short, provoking him into battle as he successfully defeats Dan. However, before he can battle Athena, he suddenly discovers that Team Cubbo has already obtained their flag, thus winning the game, and it is revealed that Athena and Dan distracted Coach Short by tricking him into abandoning his post by provoking him into battle, giving Lightning and Howlkor the chance to obtain the flag and win the game, all according to Athena's plan. It is also revealed that Athena is a big Cubbo fan. In a shocking turn of events, Cubbo reveals that he was actually streaming their contest this whole time in order to achieve a lot of views for his channel, which means that he was using the Brawlers all along. He then drives away from the Academy, having obtained his goal, leaving the AB completely dissatisfied at the moment.
291	18a	"The Masters of Disaster are Great?!"; Transliteration: "Tsuyoi Zo! Masutā Dezasutā" (Japanese: 強いぞ！マスター・デザスター)	June 5, 2022 (CA); September 1, 2022 (US)	November 11, 2022
The AB respond to an Elemental Storm threat, but they soon encounter "The Masters of Disaster" again as they easily defeat the Bakugan. More than that, the Elemental Storm has disappeared on its own, much to their confusion. While discussing the Elemental Storm threat, the AB become suspicious about everything that didn't add up with it (such as a Haos Bakugan in the presence of an Aquos Elemental Energy Surge, the Elemental hole disappearing on its own, and the Baku-Radar not being able to detect it). Suddenly, they discover another Elemental Energy Surge nearby, and a Bakugan attacking the area, but once again, "The Masters of Disaster" arrive and easily defeat the Bakugan. The AB confront them under suspicion that they're hiding something about the unexplained occurrence of the Elemental Storm and the rampaging Bakugan that they just defeated, but they suddenly run off. It turns out that Huxley Faber and George have been using the former's technology to create artificial Elemental Storms, as well as having their Bakugan stage rampages in the city and allowing "The Masters of Disaster" to defeat them as part of their plan to popularize Huxley's new Bakuversity. "The Masters of Disaster" return and ask Huxley to teach them his "Ultra Huxley Mode." While doing so, the AB arrive and expose his scam to "The Masters of Disaster," having figured out that the Elemental Storms were just holograms created by Huxley himself, which explains why they weren't detected on the Baku-Radar in the first place. In a shocking turn of events, a real Elemental Storm suddenly appears nearby as it begins to affect Master Red and his Bakugan as they easily defeat the other members. The AB rally together as they battle Master Red in their attempt to free him from the Elemental Storm that has affected his mind. Despite a rocky start, the AB manage to defeat Master Red, thus containing the Elemental Storm, and freeing him from the Elemental Energy corruption. Huxley and George then escape. In the aftermath, "The Masters of Disaster" explain to the AB that the reason they teamed up with Huxley Faber in the first place was because he offered to help their Bakugan get stronger, though they were completely unaware that they were being scammed all along. They eventually realize that the only way they can learn to evolve, is if they continue to get stronger on their own. With that being said, "The Masters of Disaster" become determined to master evolution in no time.
292	18b	"The Rare, Super-Ancient Bakugan"; Transliteration: "Maboroshi no Chō Kodai Bakugan" (Japanese: 幻の超古代爆丸)	June 5, 2022 (CA); September 1, 2022 (US)	November 11, 2022
HB takes the students on a field trip to an archaeological site as they start searching for fossils. He then takes them to a museum and shows them a diorama of what the world was like when the ancient Bakugan lived. While exploring the museum, Dan discovers an empty display. A staff member begins to explain that a fossil for a new dinosaur species is going to be put on that display very soon. It is said that this species hasn't been discovered yet, but it soon will be by Dr. Nokkenhammer, the person in charge of this dig. Dan, Wynton, and Lia soon discover him having a serious conversation with a funder named Graham who is threatening to cut all funds from his dig site if he fails to find a new species of Bakugan. Upon meeting him, Dr. Nokkenhammer reveals to them that they have discovered a Bakugan that arrived on Earth way before the Ancient Bakugan did, known as a Super-Ancient Bakugan. He shows the students the specimen, but refuses to allow it to be rolled out into battle, thinking that it would be too dangerous to do so because he believes that this Bakugan is too brutal and fearsome due to the fact that it had to survive in an extreme environment. However, after being convinced by HB to go through with it, Dr. Nokkenhammer reluctantly agrees. While waiting for him to bring out the ancient Bakugan, the staff member informs the class that he has disappeared without a trace. Dan, Wynton, and Lia start searching for Dr. Nokkenhammer and manage to find him at a cave entrance. He tells them that after they left, a thief showed up and stole the Super-Ancient Bakugan, which led him to track them here to begin with. They soon hear a rumbling sound, thinking that the Super-Ancient Bakugan is nearby. The trio begin to battle the Bakugan, revealed to be a Darkus Fade Ninja as it starts attacking them from the shadows. Luckily, using their combined strategic efforts, they manage to defeat the Bakugan, and it is revealed that it was being controlled by Dr. Nokkenhammer all along, whom Wynton caught all of a sudden, having created this setup in the first place. After learning that the Super-Ancient Bakugan was a fake all along, Dr. Nokkenhammer apologizes to the trio for lying about its existence, and the fake story about it getting stolen in the first place and reveals that the Bakugan he was using was just a normal Bakugan that he painted to make it look old. He explains that the reason he did it in the first place was because the funding that Graham gave him is about to run out because he failed to find a new species of Bakugan. Knowing that Graham will find out the truth eventually, even if Dr. Nokkenhammer apologizes to everyone, the trio reveal to him that they know someone who might be able to help him out. Later, the AB watch a news report, and it is revealed that Dan, Wynton, and Lia managed to convince Benton to have Dusk Industries contribute funding towards Dr. Nokkenhammer's excavation discovery of Ancient Bakugan as he presents a fossil of a new dinosaur species to the public.
293	19a	"The Return of Faustus"; Transliteration: "Shin no Gakuen-Chō wa Dareda" (Japanese: 真の学園長は誰だ)	June 12, 2022 (CA); September 1, 2022 (US)	November 25, 2022
Marlowe Faustus has returned to the Bakugan Academy at the behest of AAAnimus, much to everyone's delight. Benton and Kravitz begin to explain that they need his help to activate the Elemental Inductor, thinking that it can be used to gather up all the Elemental Energy Surges at once, thus putting an end to the Elemental Storm once and for all. Coach Short and some of the students aren't willing to trust him though because he was the one that caused the Elemental Storm in the first place. Faustus and Athena share a tender moment with each other, and the former reveals that he is ready to resume his role as Headmaster once again. However, Coach Short objects to his return because he still doesn't trust him. Sykes proposes a Baku-battle to settle this dispute, but since Faustus doesn't have a Bakugan to use, the rules state that someone will battle in his place. Coach Short decides to make this a three-on-three match and selects Athena, Chet, and Callie for his team, while Faustus selects Dan, Lia, and Ajit for his team. The winning team will decide who gets to run the Bakugan Academy. In the midst of the battle, Dan successfully defeats Chet and Callie with help from Lia and Ajit, leaving Athena as the only Brawler standing. Despite making a successful comeback, she prepares to summon her Nano-Gear at the behest of Coach Short, but she suddenly hesitates to do so, giving Dan the chance to defeat her with his Nano-Gear, and it is implied that Athena let Dan win on purpose because she prefers having Faustus as the one and true Headmaster. Despite Dan's victory, Coach Short refuses to work for Faustus again and decides to leave the Academy. In the end, the AB and Athena decide to work with Faustus to fix the Elemental Inductor in their attempt to eradicate the Elemental Storm once and for all, and most likely earn back everyone's trust again.
294	19b	"The Battle of the TV Station"; Transliteration: "Geki to Erementaru" (Japanese: 激撮エレメンタル)	June 12, 2022 (CA); September 1, 2022 (US)	November 25, 2022
Several students and staff members, including Coach Short have decided to leave the Bakugan Academy on account that they can no longer trust Faustus because he caused the Elemental Storm in the first place, much to the dissatisfaction of everyone who chose to stay behind to work with Faustus. Suddenly, the AB and Athena receive an alert about an Elemental Storm threat erupting in the middle of Los Volmos. They travel there with Faustus and Sykes where a large group of Elemental Energy Surges have started to erupt around the TV Station where Lia's mom works. They soon learn from a couple of AAAnimus soldiers that Veronica and her TV crew have chosen to stay behind to record the event. Faustus sends Lia and Athena to go and rescue Veronica and the TV crew, while he advises the rest of the Brawlers to deal with the Elemental Energy Surges all around Los Volmos. Upon arrival, they discover a young boy under the effect of an Elemental Energy Surge, revealed to be an actor from a TV show. After saving Veronica and the TV crew, Lia and Athena attempt to defeat his Bakugan, to no avail as it continues to cause major damage around the city. Determined to help his students, Faustus unleashes a smokescreen on the Bakugan before crash landing in the city unharmed. In a turn of events, Lia evolves Pegatrix to Speed Mode and successfully defeats the Bakugan, thus containing all the Elemental Energy Surges around the city, and freeing the boy from the Elemental Energy corruption. In the aftermath, things have started to settle down at the moment as Veronica makes an announcement about Faustus's success in stopping that Elemental Storm to begin with. She even thanks Athena for supporting Lia and helping her all the time, much to her satisfaction.
295	20a	"When Benton Disappeared"; Transliteration: "Benton Dakkan Sakusen" (Japanese: ベントン奪還作戦)	June 19, 2022 (CA); September 1, 2022 (US)	December 9, 2022
Faustus tells the AB that Benton is visiting the Academy today because he's bringing him data that he needs for some important research and asks them to give him a tour of the campus. However, he soon learns that Benton hasn't arrived yet. They soon discover that his airship was intercepted halfway through his journey, until Dusk Industries lost contact with it at the location where it was intercepted. The AB become determined to find Benton, no matter what. It turns out that Benton has been captured by the Gate Crushers, and Wagner needs him to unlock the briefcase with the data inside that he plans to use for his own purpose. He starts using his cracking program as it starts working through the locks in an attempt to unlock the case, and retrieve the data inside. Meanwhile, the AB arrive on the island and discover the airship that Benton was in, deducing that he might have been taken by someone. They start searching for him, which leads them to a cave. However, they soon get caught up in a series of traps set by Wagner after discovering their presence as he attempts to slow them down. The AB begin to fight through the traps, but they end up separated from Dan in the process. This leads to a confrontation between Dan and Wagner who was behind Benton's kidnapping all along. As he battles him, Wagner uses a device to his advantage that has the ability to eliminate all Baku-cores within this area, leaving Dan at a standstill. Elsewhere, one of the Gate Crushers forces Benton to open the case with his fingerprint and succeeds in unlocking the last lock, thus retrieving the data. Benton then escapes and intercepts Wagner, giving Dan the chance to power up Drago as he successfully defeats their Bakugan. After regrouping with the rest of the AB, Wagner initiates the self-destruct sequence on the island and escapes with the stolen data, prompting the AB and Benton to escape as well. After escaping, Benton remains concerned about the data that is now in the hands of the Gate Crushers. It turns out that the data is Benton's research on gate technology which Wagner plans to use to complete his ultimate goal, separating Vestroia from Earth.
296	20b	"Lightning's Elegant Day"; Transliteration: "Madamu no Kiken na Korekushon" (Japanese: マダムの危険なコレクション)	June 19, 2022 (CA); September 1, 2022 (US)	December 9, 2022
Lightning is enjoying himself in a luxurious place, much to Howlkor's concern. Earlier, Lightning and Howlkor decided to take a walk around the town. A wealthy woman named Madame Marie spots Lightning and becomes intrigued with him because he has a Bakugan with him. Determined to keep him as her own, Madame Marie lures Lightning to her and takes him back to her mansion as her servants start showering him with food and gifts, much to his delight. He soon meets a scarred dog named Hank who explains that he was taken in by Madame Marie and was given a job as a guard dog. She has a lot of expensive tastes, which is why she brings certain animals back to her home after spotting them, but they all ran away because they couldn't stand the terrible treatment that they endured from her. This leaves Lightning concerned about it. Suddenly, the servants arrive and take Lightning to a room where he shockingly discovers pictures of all the animals that received the same treatment from Madame Marie, then he deduces her true intention; she intends to keep Lightning with her forever by dressing him up in a ridiculous outfit under a new name. Refusing to live this lifestyle, Lightning escapes as the servants, including Hank start chasing him all over this place. Lightning escapes the mansion, only to be stopped by Hank's Bakugan. He decides to challenge Hank to a battle which he accepts; if he wins, Hank will have to let him go, but if Hank wins, Lightning will be forced to live in Madame Marie's house from now on. Although evenly matched, Lightning summons his Nanogan Shadow and successfully defeats Hank, much to his disappointment. Lightning then escapes. Madame Marie returns and soon discovers Hank as her servants fill her in on the story, and in a surprising turn of events, she becomes intrigued with Hank because he rolled out a Bakugan for the first time. Therefore, she decides to rename him, thus fulfilling Hank's wish. In the aftermath, Lightning returns to the Academy all tired out, having realized that he's better off with the AB, rather than Madame Marie. Later, Athena returns to her dorm room and shockingly discovers Lightning sleeping on her stuffed Cubbo, much to her annoyance.
297	21a	"Get Back the Baku-Balls!"; Transliteration: "Bakugan Gansaku-ka" (Japanese: 爆丸贋作家)	June 26, 2022 (CA); September 1, 2022 (US)	December 23, 2022
The AB visit a museum where Dan is excited to see the Ancient Bakugan exhibit. While looking at the displays, Ajit reveals that they're all fakes, much to their complete shock. Director Robert is informed of the counterfeit, and Dan proves it by rolling one of them out, revealed to be a fake all along. Ajit deduces that the person who switched out the real Bakugan with fakes was Sterling Glatman, a criminal counterfeiter who always leaves his signatures on every fake that he leaves behind. The AB decide to catch him in the act, thinking that he will go after the Ancient Golden Bakugan next. Late at night, the AB successfully catch who they believe is Sterling, but they end up catching a security guard instead. However, Ajit deduces that he's working for Sterling, so they force him to lead them to his hideout. Upon arrival, Dan, Wynton, and Lia battle Sterling, and it is revealed that this is Ajit's plan, distracting him while he and Shun search for the real Ancient Bakugan inside his hideout. After a long search, Ajit activates a switch revealing his secret hiding spot, thinking that the Ancient Bakugan are in there. Shun and Ajit then contact Dan and reveal to him that they have found the real Ancient Bakugan, and that they've already called the authorities to have Sterling arrested before Dan successfully defeats him. In the aftermath, the AB return the real Ancient Bakugan to Robert as they are put on display for the public to see.
298	21b	"The Return of Lord Brakken!"; Transliteration: "Kurisutaru ni Koishite" (Japanese: クリスタルに恋して)	June 26, 2022 (CA); September 1, 2022 (US)	December 23, 2022
Lord Brakken arrives at the Bakugan Academy to profess his love to Lia who immediately rejects him. This leads to a battle where the latter easily defeats him. However, Dan and Wynton soon learn that he has now turned his attention towards Crystal Blue, much to their shock. He asks them to help him get her attention and offers them a huge reward if they do so; Dan and Wynton reluctantly agree. They start presenting some artwork, thinking that it will get her attention, but Crystal Blue shows no reaction to them. With no other options left, Dan suggests to Brakken that he challenge her to a Baku-battle, thinking that it will get her attention this time. Crystal Blue refuses to battle him at first, but Dan and Wynton manage to convince her to do so after revealing that Brakken will offer her all kinds of food made with beans if she wins; Crystal Blue reluctantly agrees. In the midst of the battle, Dan and Wynton become worried that they won't get their award if Brakken loses. They prepare to give him some advice to ensure that he wins, only to be stopped by Lia and Athena who try to prevent them from interfering. This leads to an ensuing battle between the four Brawlers. However, Brakken suddenly becomes infatuated with Athena as well. Later, he contacts Dan and Wynton and tells them that he has considered Lia, Crystal Blue, and Athena his soulmates, and that he plans to visit the Academy soon, much to their dissatisfaction. This leads to an angry confrontation with Lia and Athena who found out that they did this all for a reward. Elsewhere, Crystal Blue is happily enjoying her meal from Brakken, hoping to battle him again soon, and it is implied that she has started to develop feelings for him.
299	22a	"Gate Crisis!"; Transliteration: "Gyakushū no Wāgunā" (Japanese: 逆襲のワーグナー)	September 11, 2022 (CA); September 1, 2022 (US)	January 6, 2023
Dan tells the AB that he's going to Vestroia with Drago because the latter is attending a Supreme Bakugan Council meeting about the Elemental Storm that is causing a lot of damage on Vestroia as requested by Pyravian. Since Faustus and Jenny are using the mobile gate to work on the Elemental Inductor, Dan suggests that they ask Benton for help. Luckily, he agrees to allow the former to use the gate at his facility which will take him and Drago to Vestroia. Soon after their departure, Benton and the AB discover that someone has hacked into the Gate Control Tower Security System (which was built to protect all the gates around the world), revealed to be Wagner who is planning to use Benton's data to complete his ultimate goal, separating Vestroia from Earth. Since they only have one hour until all the gates close completely, the AB decide to split up; Wynton and Shun will go to the control tower to bring the security system back online, while Lia, Lightning, and Ajit stay behind to help Benton protect this facility from Wagner. Shun and Wynton arrive at the Gate Control Tower in their attempt to bring the security system back online, but they are soon intercepted by Wagner's drones which trap them in a Tusk Guard shield. Despite using Nanogan and Strength Mode, it is still not enough to break free. Luckily, in a shocking turn of events, Wynton summons his Nano-Gear, and together with Shun, they successfully break free from the Tusk Guard shield, as well as destroying the drones. However, it is already too late because time is up. At first they start to believe that they failed to complete their objective, but in a surprising turn of events, Lia contacts them and tells them that Benton was able to protect the gate back at the facility, which means that Earth and Vestroia haven't been severed yet. It also means that Shun and Wynton still have a chance to get the security system back online. Elsewhere, Wagner finds out about the one gate that still remains and becomes determined to close it on his own.
300	22b	"The Last Gate!"; Transliteration: "Saigo no Gēto" (Japanese: 最後のゲート)	September 11, 2022 (CA); September 1, 2022 (US)	January 6, 2023
Dan and Drago arrive in Vestroia where they are greeted by Fenneca who takes them to the Council Chamber. Upon arrival, the Council members start discussing what course of actions to take in order to eradicate the Elemental Storm completely. Dan tells them about the Elemental Inductor which can be used to do so. Fenneca also mentions Wrath's disappearance, and who knows where he could be now. The Council is soon informed that all but one of the gates have been closed completely, prompting them to investigate further. Back on Earth, the remaining AB become determined to protect the last gate that remains at this facility. Benton informs them that intruders have broken into the facility, prompting Lightning and Ajit to go and investigate, but they find nothing out there. Suddenly, a Tusk Guard shield begins to envelop around the facility, preventing them from getting back in, and it is revealed that this is Wagner's doing as he begins to close the final gate, which means that Dan and Drago can't get back to Earth. This leads to an ensuing Baku-battle between Lia and Wagner who reveals that he orchestrated this diversion in order to split up the AB. Despite using Nanogan and Strength Mode, Lia is still outmatched by all of Wagner's Bakugan. She soon hears Fenneca's voice, and after being inspired by her words, Lia summons her Nano-Gear and successfully defeats Wagner. Wynton makes contact with them and reveals that he and Shun have managed to get the security system at the Gate Control Tower back online just as Dan and Drago return from Vestroia. Just then, McQ suddenly arrives to retrieve Wagner as ordered by their sponsor as they make their escape, and it is implied that they're working together. After escaping, McQ tells Wagner that he has a plan to close all of the gates once and for all, much to his complete shock.
301	23a	"Showdown with Short's Bakugan Academy!"; Transliteration: "Shōto Bakugan Akademī" (Japanese: ショート爆丸アカデミー)	September 18, 2022 (CA); September 1, 2022 (US)	January 20, 2023
The Brawlers are hanging out at the beach while awaiting a barbecue that Shun is planning, until Coach Short (having created his own Bakugan Academy) and his students arrive to set up their base camp here at this beach, much to the Brawler's dissatisfaction. This leads to a confrontation where Athena stands up for Shun by calling out Chet and Callie for leaving the Bakugan Academy with Short because they used to be a team who vowed to save the world together. Short decides to settle this dispute with a Baku-battle to see who gets the beach which they accept. The battle will be Shun and Athena vs. Short. In the midst of the battle, Athena summons her Nano-Gear, but Short summons his Nano-Gear as well and nearly defeats her. Luckily, Shun, after calling out Chet and Callie for abandoning Athena, summons his Nano-Gear and successfully defeats Short. In the aftermath, Short and his students prepare to leave the beach, but Shun and Athena manage to convince them to stay because they want to share the beach as well; Short reluctantly agrees. In the end, the Brawlers start to enjoy their barbecue that Shun has prepared for them, much to the dismay of Chet and Callie.
302	23b	"Magnus Gets an Apprentice?!"; Transliteration: "Shishō wa Magunasu" (Japanese: 師匠はマグナス)	September 18, 2022 (CA); September 1, 2022 (US)	January 20, 2023
Magnus and Nillious are searching for Wrath, thinking that he's somewhere in Los Volmos. Elsewhere, "The Masters of Disaster'" are in a confrontation with a Gate Crusher who is attempting to close a gate that they're guarding. This leads to Masters Red and Green running away out of fear. Before the Gate Crusher can hurt Master Blue, Magnus arrives and saves him, causing him to retreat. Master Blue becomes intrigued with Magnus and asks him to make him his apprentice, but he refuses because he prefers to work alone. Nevertheless, he continues to follow Magnus around, much to his annoyance. He then receives a signal from a gate that is nearby and heads there with Master Blue, revealed to be the same location where he saved him from the Gate Crusher from earlier. Upon arrival, Masters Red and Green return to apologize to Master Blue, but he's still upset with them for abandoning him in the first place. The Gate Crusher soon returns and captures the former and the latter, holding them hostage in the process. This leads to a battle between him and Magnus. Seeing his friends in danger, Master Blue joins in and frees them, and they decide to make amends. Magnus then summons his Nano-Gear and successfully defeats the Gate Crusher who attempts to retreat again, but he manages to capture him. He then interrogates him, demanding to know the name of the sponsor that he's working for, who just happens to be a collector of rare Golden Bakugan. The Gate Crusher reveals that the name of his sponsor is Ted Janssen, the president of Janssen Tech, whose real name is Gregorius Reed, much to his complete shock before AAAnimus arrives to collect him. He then flies away to parts unknown.
303	24a	"Roommate Battle"; Transliteration: "Rūmumeito Batoru" (Japanese: ルームメイト・バトル)	September 25, 2022 (CA); September 1, 2022 (US)	February 3, 2023
Ajit witnesses Shun using his Nano-Gear during a practice match with Chad and wishes he could summon his own Nano-Gear as well. However, the other Brawlers are too busy to help him because today is roommate bonding week; Dan is too busy studying with Wynton, and Lia and Riot are working on a music video. At one point, he decides to track down his roommate and asks Lightning for help, to no avail. Lia and Riot soon show up and ask for Ajit's help with the video shoot, and he reluctantly agrees. Arriving at the set, he discovers Lia and Riot arguing over their different ideas for the video. This results in a Baku-battle where they inadvertently unleash an Elemental Energy Surge which suddenly begins to affect one of the actress's Bakugan. Lia and Riot attempt to defeat it, but their constant arguing begins to affect their focus. Ajit joins in as he persuades them to put their differences aside and work together. With some encouragement from Pharol, Ajit makes a comeback with help from Lia and Riot. He then summons his Nano-Gear and successfully defeats the Bakugan, thus containing the Elemental Energy Surge. In the aftermath, Lia and Riot seem to have reached an agreement on how to make their video, especially with some of Lia's ideas, but another argument rises once again, much to Ajit's dismay.
304	24b	"The Gate Crushers Attack!"; Transliteration: "Nerawareta Akademī" (Japanese: 狙われたアカデミー)	September 25, 2022 (CA); September 1, 2022 (US)	February 3, 2023
Faustus informs the AB and Athena that someone has hacked into their main server. They soon learn that an Elemental Storm has erupted on the Academy's training area. Upon arrival, they soon discover that this was all a diversion created by Wagner who reveals that McQ told him about a diamond that possesses a huge amount of Elemental Energy, which is part of the Elemental Inductor that he plans to use to destroy all of the gates. McQ suddenly appears and captures Faustus and Jenny as Wagner forces the AB and Athena to hand over their Baku-Balls. However, Lightning suddenly appears and frees Faustus and Jenny after tying up McQ and his goons. He then regroups with the AB and Athena as Wagner initiates a battle against him. In the midst of the battle, despite being outmatched, Lightning manages to defeat half of his Bakugan, but the rest of them continue to overpower him and they nearly defeat him. Inspired by Howlkor's words after he stands up for him, Lightning summons his Nano-Gear and successfully defeats Wagner. He then reclaims the stolen Baku-Balls and returns them to the AB and Athena. Wagner and McQ then escape while swearing revenge on them.
305	25a	"Battle for the Academy"; Transliteration: "Tomoni Tatakau Nakama" (Japanese: 共に闘う仲間)	October 2, 2022 (CA); September 1, 2022 (US)	February 17, 2023
Faustus, Benton, Wynton, and Jenny attempt to activate the Elemental Inductor, to no avail. Benton suspects that the destabilizing gates are interfering with its activation. As a last resort, Faustus reveals that he knows someone who might be able to help them. The next day, all the members of Shorts Bakugan Academy arrive, and it is revealed that Faustus asked them to come here because he not only needs Professor K's help since he's an expert on Elemental Energy, but also everyone's help in order to combat the Gate Crushers. Short is reluctant to accept Faustus's request due to his trust issues with him. This results in Athena and the AB standing up to him, proclaiming that they've come a long way thanks to Faustus. Short decides to challenge them to a battle which they accept; if they win, Short's faction will cooperate with them, but if he wins, his faction will not only take over this campus, but the remnants of Faustus's faction will be forced to go along with his teaching methods once again. The battle will be Dan and Athena vs Short and Professor K. Despite a rocky start, Dan and Athena manage to make a successful comeback with their combined teamwork. Short and Professor K summon their Nanogan, and Athena prepares to summon her Nano-Gear, but Professor K stops her from doing so. Short prepares to finish Dan off, but Athena manages to block the attack, giving Dan the chance to summon his Nanogan, as well as his Nano-Gear as he successfully defeats Short and Professor K. As a result, the students and teachers that left in the first place agree to return to the Academy as promised. Short reluctantly agrees to return as well for the sake of the Earth upon realizing that he can help all the students become ideal Brawlers just like Dan and Athena. He then resumes his role as gym teacher once again.
306	25b	"Showdown With the Gate Crushers!"; Transliteration: "Wāgunā to no Kessen" (Japanese: ワーグナーとの決戦)	October 2, 2022 (CA); September 1, 2022 (US)	February 17, 2023
The AB, Benton, and the AAAnimus Security Force travel to the Gate Crushers hideout in their attempt to stop the Gate Crushers once and for all. It is also revealed that earlier, Magnus told the AB that the president of Janssen Tech is Gregorius Reed who has teamed up with the Gate Crushers in order to help them achieve their ultimate goal. He also told them that he gave the location of their hideout to AAAnimus. After being ambushed by McQ upon their arrival, Lia, Shun, and Ajit decide to remain behind to hold him off, while Benton, Lightning, Dan, and Wynton head for the Gate Crushers secret hideout. Upon arrival, Wagner and the Gate Crushers appear before them, including Gregorius Reed who reveals that he plans to eradicate all Bakugan from Earth as revenge for losing everything he once had, including his wealth after he was betrayed by Viloch. At one point, the Security Force arrives to assist the AB, but Wagner uses a device from Janssen Tech to prevent that from happening, which also has the ability to control the Baku-cores at will, and provide shields for him and his followers (McQ also has a device with those same abilities), leaving the AB at a huge disadvantage. Determined to create a bright future together with their Bakugan, Dan successfully summons an Elemental Core and evolves Drago to Strength Mode as he makes a comeback. However, in a shocking turn of events, the Gate Crushers discover that the control room has been destroyed, and it is implied that this was Magnus's doing, which means that Wagner (and McQ) no longer have control of the Baku-cores, giving the AB the advantage needed to win. Wagner and Reed attempt to escape, but they are soon caught by Benton, Kravitz, and the Security Force, having raided all of their hideouts to begin with. After they are taken into custody, the AB learn from Magnus that Wrath destroyed the control room, not him, much to their confusion. Still, Dan and the AB are determined to stop Wrath once and for all.
307	26a	"The Elemental Inductor"; Transliteration: "Kirifuda no Kansei" (Japanese: 切り札の完成)	October 9, 2022 (CA); September 1, 2022 (US)	March 3, 2023
Life at the Academy has returned to normal, whereas the teachers are keeping a lookout for Wrath, thinking that he plans on going after the Elemental Inductor. The next day after a heartwarming speech, Faustus prepares to activate the Elemental Inductor, intending to put an end to the Elemental Storm completely on both Earth and Vestroia, but unbeknownst to everyone, McQ, disguised as an AAAnimus soldier appears and takes over the Elemental Inductor which he uses to release the Elemental Energies everywhere as they begin to affect the soldiers and half of the teachers nearby. Dan sends Lia, Athena, and Ajit to the observatory, while he and the others deal with the rampaging Bakugan. Both the teachers and a couple of the students put up a massive fight, but despite their best efforts, they all end up defeated. Dan, Shun, and Lightning are then left at a standstill against the rampaging Bakugan.
308	26b	"Wrath's Purpose"; Transliteration: "Rāsu no Yabō" (Japanese: ラースの野望)	October 9, 2022 (CA); September 1, 2022 (US)	March 3, 2023
The rampaging Bakugan affected by the Elemental Energies continue to overpower Dan, Shun, and Lightning (they're already defeated except for Dan), until Magnus arrives to assist them. Elsewhere, Wynton continues his attempts to activate the Elemental Inductor in order to absorb all the Elemental Energies that were released from the machine, and free everyone from the Elemental Energy corruptions. McQ breaks free from Faustus and summons Wrath, whom he is working for. The AB and their allies attempt to defeat him, but suffer heavy casualties. Wrath advises McQ to activate the Elemental Inductor so that he can absorb the entire Elemental Storm, which he does. Faustus deduces that this was Wrath's goal all along; absorbing the entire Elemental Storm, which is why he attacked the control room in the first place, thus stopping the Gate Crushers in order to do so. But it's not just the Elemental Storm that he's after, but also the energies from the faction crystals on Vestroia. He has remained in hiding all this time, waiting until Faustus fixed the Elemental Inductor which he plans to use for that single purpose, all according to plan. Professor K steps in to battle Wrath while he advises the others, mainly Wynton, to deal with the Elemental Inductor, but he fails to stop McQ from activating it as it begins to absorb the entire Elemental Storm. This begins to have drastic effects in the faction realms of Vestroia. McQ then transfers the energies to Wrath as he begins to grow in power, leaving everyone completely shocked by what he has become.
309	27a	"A New Power Genesis"; Transliteration: "Zetsubō no Toki" (Japanese: 絶望の時)	October 16, 2022 (CA); September 1, 2022 (US)	March 17, 2023
Wrath has become the most powerful Bakugan in the world after absorbing the entire Elemental Storm. Faustus and Wynton attempt to use the Elemental Inductor to absorb the Elemental Energy that's inside of Wrath, but he easily destroys it. Dan, Magnus, and Athena rally together once more as they attempt to take down Wrath, but he easily defeats both Magnus and Athena. At first it is implied that Wrath has won, but Athena and the AB encourage Dan and Drago to fight back as the diamond begins absorbing their energy. Despite Faustus's warning, Dan and Drago begin absorbing the energy from inside the diamond, allowing them to unlock an even greater power/evolution known as Dragonoid Genesis. The final showdown continues.
310	27b	"Dragonoid Genesis!"; Transliteration: "Doragonoido Jeneshisu" (Japanese: ドラゴノイドジェネシス)	October 16, 2022 (CA); September 1, 2022 (US)	March 17, 2023
Drago has become Dragonoid Genesis, which means that his power level is now equal to Wrath's. It also means that he now has the power of Strength and Speed combined. Despite being evenly matched, Wrath is still powerful from the Elemental Energy he absorbed from the Elemental Storm, but Dan and Drago begin to increase their power from the strength of everyone at the Academy as they successfully defeat Wrath from their comeback. Faustus attempts to offer Wrath a chance for redemption, but instead, he rushes towards the diamond and begins absorbing the Elemental Energy from it in an attempt to achieve Genesis Evolution just like Drago despite the former's warning, but he is presumably destroyed in the process. With peace restored on Earth and Vestroia, following the end of the Elemental Storm, things have finally returned to normal. Despite the damage that has happened to the Academy, and the passing of the Elemental Storm, Athena tells Faustus that she wants to stay and help him rebuild the Bakugan Academy in order to continue her studies here, and he happily agrees. Elsewhere, the AB have returned to their old school, but Dan is nowhere to be seen. It turns out that he and Drago have decided to return to the Bakugan Academy because they want to help rebuild it, and continue their studies there as they are determined to keep getting stronger than before.
311 312	28	"The Wrath Of Wrath"; Transliteration: "Shin no Rāsu" (Japanese: 真のラース)	October 23, 2022 (CA); September 1, 2022 (US)	March 17, 2023
A few months after Wrath's defeat/"demise," the AB continue to defend Los Volmos with their Bakugan by stopping criminals while using their Dromes to prevent any damage from happening. However, Lieutenant Dorman, the second-in-command of AAAnimus doesn't trust them. After Dan demonstrates his Genesis Evolution at the Bakugan Academy, Faustus announces that the AB are gonna be attending a ceremony at the civic center in their honor. Meanwhile, Lightning is enjoying a meal at his favorite restaurant, until Howlkor begins to sense a Bakugan nearby, including Lightning himself, presumably Wrath, thought to have been destroyed. They attempt to set up a Drome with a gate card, but Wrath easily destroys it, thus preventing them from setting up a Drome and attacks the area, including Howlkor (who crashes into the restaurant). As a result, Lightning is blamed for the damage. The next day, Kravitz and Dorman visit the AB in search of Lightning because they believe that he and Howlkor caused damage to some buildings from yesterday, including the restaurant as well. After they leave, Dorman continues his suspicions against the AB, still believing that they're a threat to Los Volmos, but Kravitz refuses to believe him. Back at Studio D, Howlkor begins to explain the events that happened yesterday to the AB, much to their disbelief. However, they soon discover later in the day that the damage to the restaurant from yesterday has reached the news, and the people are beginning to judge the AB too quickly because of it. At the ceremony, a large crowd has begun to protest against the AB because they still blame them for the recent damage that happened yesterday. Unbeknownst to everyone, Wrath soon appears, but only the Bakugan can see him; to the humans, they can't see him, prompting the AB to take action. However, Wrath tricks them into causing damage to the civic center as part of his plan to ruin the AB's reputation. At one point, Dan and Drago attempt to achieve Genesis Evolution, but Wrath quickly stops them from doing so. Kravitz orders Lieutenant Dorman to stop Wrath, but instead, he and his forces begin attacking the AB Bakugan. Dan tries but fails to persuade Dorman that Wrath is responsible for the damage that he caused in the first place, not the AB. Wrath attacks again as Kravitz succeeds in saving the mayor at the cost of getting injured in the process. The AB are blamed for her injury, and Dorman prepares to arrest them, but Magnus intervenes as they manage to escape. They follow him underground in order to avoid detection from the public. While hiding from the public, Ajit returns with disguises, thinking that they can blend in without being recognized. However, the AB soon discover that Faustus was at the ceremony before the attack happened, much to their suspicion. They decide to go talk to him, and Wynton suggests that they travel through Vestroia in order to reach the Bakugan Academy undetected. They show up in Athena's dorm room and inform her of Wrath's return, as well as the situation they're in now, having been framed by him. Athena takes the AB to Faustus as they ask him about his presence at the ceremony. Faustus lies that he was at the ceremony, and that he got called back to the Academy because someone tried to break into his office. The AB inform him of Wrath's return, including the fact that he framed them for all the damage that he caused to the city, including the restaurant and the ceremony. They also suspect that he's using Genesis Evolution to his advantage. Faustus shows the AB an improved version of the Elemental Inductor, equipped with a Stasis Modulator which he plans to use to cut off Wrath's power and trap him in a cage. The next day, the AB prepare to use the Elemental Inductor to trap Wrath in the cage, all according to plan, but in a shocking turn of events, Faustus suddenly turns on them and traps them in the cage instead as he contacts AAAnimus. Faustus reveals that he is Wrath and explains that he was presumably "destroyed" after he attempted to use the diamond to evolve to Genesis as well, but the light restored the former's evil personality, only this time, he and Wrath became one as a result. He soon transforms into Wrath and disappears before AAAnimus arrives to arrest the AB and Athena. It is also implied that Faustus/Wrath plans to fuse Earth and Vestroia into one planet. As the AB and Athena are being interrogated, AAAnimus is soon alerted to a Bakugan threat in the city, possibly Wrath, prompting Dorman to leave them behind while he deals with it. Vestroia begins fusing with Earth, causing a lot of chaos in the city as a result, which was Wrath's plan all along. In a shocking turn of events, Sharktar, Falcron, Fenneca, Ferascal, and Pincitaur arrive to rescue the AB. As the chaos continues to spread across Los Volmos, which is being caused by Wrath, Dan advises Athena to team up with Falcron and the others and help save the people in the city, leaving the AB to deal with Wrath on their own. Dorman and his forces attempt to take down Wrath, to no avail due to his extreme power level. The AB soon arrive, as well as Kravitz who has recovered from her injuries as she angrily attacks Dorman for falsely accusing the AB for being criminals and arresting them in the first place. After evolving to Genesis, the AB prepare to battle Wrath in order to stop him from merging Earth and Vestroia completely. They put up a massive fight, but suffer heavy casualties. Dan continues the battle, but Wrath is still too powerful. He suddenly realizes that the only way to beat him is to elementally evolve again. The AB tap into their Elemental Energies again as Drago becomes equally matched to Wrath, but all of a sudden, he begins to struggle in the process because he is unable to control it well as he nearly gives in to the elemental rage. This begins to affect Dan as well, until Magnus, Athena, and the Guardian Bakugan arrive to help him overcome the energy inside of him and Drago. With everyone's help, Dan and Drago manage to overcome the excess amount of Elemental Energy inside of them as they make a successful comeback against Wrath, in which they ultimately defeat him, thus preventing Earth and Vestroia from merging into one planet (the Elemental Energy that they borrowed has returned to Vestroia). Since Faustus is still fused with Wrath, Sharktar says that they will take the latter back to Vestroia, to the realm of Aquilia so that the healing waters can repair him as they return to Vestroia. In the aftermath, things have returned to normal, and the AB names have finally been cleared as they are once again honored for their heroism for saving the world.
