= Bakugan: Battle Planet =

Television anime series

- Japanese promotional image.
- Also known as: see list: Bakugan: Armored Alliance (Note: In Japanese: 爆丸アーマードアライアンス (Bakugan Āmādo Araiansu)) (season 2); Bakugan: Geogan Rising (Note: In Japanese: 爆丸ジオガンライジング (Bakugan Jiogan Raijingu)) (season 3); Bakugan: Evolutions (Note: In Japanese: 爆丸エボリューションズ (Bakugan Eboryūshonzu)) (season 4); Bakugan: Legends (Note: In Japanese: 爆丸レジェンズ (Bakugan Rejenzu)) (season 5)
- Created by: Spin Master
- Story by: Kazuhiko Inukai (S1–S2); Isao Murayama (S3–S5)
- Directed by: Kazuya Ichikawa (S1–S2); Hideki Okamoto (S3–S5)
- Music by: International version; Voodoo Highway (Note: A team of music composers consisting of Brian Pickett, Graeme Cornies, David Kelly and James Chapple); Japanese version; Yasuharu Takanashi
- Countries of origin: Japan; Canada
- Original language: English
- No. of seasons: 5
- No. of episodes: 169 (Note: 338 segments.) (list of episodes)

Production
- Executive producers: Toshi Sugimoto; Pam Westman; Jennifer Dodge; Mark Segal; Ronnen Harary; Scott Dyer (S1–S3); Yoshiharu Suzuki (S1); Tadashi Takezaki (S2–S3)
- Producers: Daisuke Kawanabe; Michael Tillman; Thomas Tretter; Dave Beatty (S1–S4); Mike G. Moore (S1–S4); Jonah Stroh (S1–S4); John Blaney (S1); Patricia Burns (S1); Matt Beatty (S2–S4); James Martin (S2); Adam Hyman (S3–S5); David Sharples (S4); Liam Beirne (S4–S5); Eric Steinhart (S5); Michael Lee (S5)
- Editor: Man of Action
- Running time: 22–23 minutes
- Production companies: Nelvana; Spin Master Entertainment; TMS Entertainment Co., Ltd.

Original release
- Network: Cartoon Network (United States, S1-2); Teletoon (Note: Teletoon was rebranded as Cartoon Network Canada in 2023.)/YTV (Canada); TXN (TV Tokyo) (S1)/YouTube (S2–S5) (Japan)
- Release: December 31, 2018 – March 1, 2023

Bakugan: Battle Planet (爆(ばく)丸(がん)バトルプラネット, Bakugan Batoru Puranetto) is an anime television series serving as a reboot of the 2007–2008 series Bakugan Battle Brawlers. The series is produced by Nelvana, Spin Master Entertainment and TMS Entertainment, and story edited by Man of Action Entertainment. Battle Planet premiered in North America in December 2018, airing on Teletoon in Canada and Cartoon Network in the United States, and later debuted in Japan in April 2019.

The second season, titled Bakugan: Armored Alliance (爆(ばく)丸(がん)アーマードアライアンス, Bakugan Āmādo Araiansu), premiered on February 16, 2020, in Canada, and on March 1 in the U.S. It was released exclusively online in Japan on April 3, 2020.

The third season Bakugan: Geogan Rising (爆(ばく)丸(がん)ジオガンライジング, Bakugan Jiogan Raijingu) premiered on January 24, 2021, in Canada, with its first thirteen episodes streaming on Netflix in the United States starting April 15, 2021. The second half was released on Roblox's Bakugan hub on September 8, 2021, and on Netflix on September 15.

A fourth season, Bakugan: Evolutions, debuted in Canada on Teletoon on February 6, 2022.

A fifth and final season titled Bakugan: Legends streamed on Netflix on March 1, 2023.

On June 16, 2023, a trailer for another Bakugan reboot was released on YouTube. The reboot was released on Netflix on September 1, 2023, and also started airing on Disney XD on September 23, 2023. The first two episodes were previewed on Roblox on August 4, 2023.

== Plot ==
The series follows preteens Dan Kouzo, Shun Kazami, Wynton Styles, Lia Venegas, and their dog Lightning. They are known as the "Awesome Ones" (later the "Awesome Brawlers") and make videos on the website ViewTube. Eventually, they stumble across a race of battling biomechanical creatures called Bakugan. They soon befriend the Bakugan and begin to battle each other with them, all while defending their neighborhood from thugs who use the Bakugan for malicious purposes. They encounter many foes such as Philomena Dusk and the mysterious Magnus, bent on beating Dan in a Bakugan Battle to be the best brawler.

As the Awesome Ones continue to learn more about the Bakugan, they befriend the enigmatic billionaire Benton Dusk, Philomena's brother. Benton uncovers a mysterious underground world he dubs "The Maze", where the Bakugan are enhanced. When a Bakugan hunter named Strata kidnaps several Bakugan, a Bakugan named Phaedrus escapes and warns the Awesome Ones. They go to the Maze and rescue the others, but fall even deeper into it. As they try to make their way home, the Awesome Ones encounter a strange evil Bakugan named Tiko. Drago and the others find a powerful artifact called the Core Cell within the Maze and protect it from Tiko. However, when Drago is injured by the corrupting V Virus, he and Dan retreat into the Core Cell, and Tiko makes it inside. Drago is healed and experiences a power upgrade called a Bakugan Evolution. Drago evolves into Hyper Drago and defeats Tiko. The Awesome Ones then escape the Maze. Soon after, they learn that Magnus is working with Philomina, along with several other of their old rivals, as AAAnimus' publicity team, The Exit. In order to combat them, the Awesome Ones learn, one by one, to evolve their Bakugan without going inside the Core Cell. Eventually, they defeat the Exit and they are fired. Despite their efforts, AAAnimus learns that there are more Core Cells within the Maze, and they successfully extract one. They use it to take control of the Awesome Ones' primary Bakugan. Benton creates a plan to stop them. They break into AAAnimus' headquarters, and while Benton dismantles their network, the Awesome Ones act as decoys. The plan works, and they defeat Philomina. Benton informs the Awesome Ones of his plan to make all the Core Cells open-sourced, which sets them on an adventure around the world. However, even greater threats lurk in the shadows. Tiko survived his battle in the Core Cell, and hatches a plan of his own.

== Characters ==
Dan Kouzo (ダン・クーソー, Dan Kūsō; Dan Kuso in Japan)
Voiced by: Rie Takahashi (Japanese), Jonah Wineberg (English)
Dan is optimistic, forthcoming and intense. Like his Battle Brawlers counterpart Daniel Kuso, Dan can sometimes be overconfident and has shown that goes on his knees when he loses a battle.
Wynton Styles (ウィントン・スタイルズ, Uinton Sutairuzu)
Voiced by: Jun Fukushima (Japanese), Deven Mack (English)
For his age, Wynton is highly intelligent. Wynton's intelligence is high enough for him to make his own devices. For example, he was smart enough to devise a Core Cell Tracker which would lead them to a place with the most concentration of the Core Cell.
Lia Venegas (リア・ヴェネガス, Ria Venegasu)
Voiced by: Chinatsu Akasaki (Japanese), Margarita Valderrama (English)
Lia is a caring and eccentric brawler. Lia often has a camera with her to show the world about new discoveries of Bakugan and mainly because her mother is a news reporter. Lia is very confident of her abilities similar to Dan, but unlike Dan, Lia's confidence never shifts into arrogance.
Shun Kazami (シュン・カザミ)
Voiced by: Yumi Uchiyama (Japanese), Ticoon Kim (S1), Jaimee Joe Gonzaga (S2-5) (English)
Much like Shun's Battle Brawlers counterpart, he is very reserved but also very calm, he is also very thoughtful, thinking very well about things that may be something great but potentially not. An example is when he starts to think if giving the Core Cell's energy worldwide is really a good idea.
Lightning (ライトニング, Raitoningu)
Voiced by: Aki Kanada (Japanese), Will Bowes (English)
Lightning has white fur with brown parts. He has brown ears, brown patches on the sides of his head, brown eyes, a brown heart-like symbol on the side of his body and a small brown tail.
Benton Dusk (ベントン・ダスク, Benton Dasuku)
Voiced by: Shin-ichiro Miki (Japanese), Will Bowes (English)
Magnus Black (マグナス・ブラック, Magunasu Burakku)
Voiced by: Shohei Kajikawa (Japanese), Julius Cho (English)
Magnus has a dark personality along with being highly enigmatic. He is normally quiet though he can get angry quite easily if annoyed by constant talking, shown in episode 60 with Dan. Magnus doesn't really like being around anyone either, due to his shame in the past.
China Riot (チャイナ・リオット, Chaina Raiotto)
Voiced by: Mei Shibata (Japanese), Josette Jorge (English)
China is quite vicious and witty in battle. However outside of battle, she is very cheeky, arrogant and spoiled. She also thinks she is entitled to everything such Col. Armstrong Tripp's Bakugan, and is very bossy and somewhat lazy as shown by the fact that she has waitresses that do what she says and tried to get the most credit when Dan defeated Magnus which increased her smugness.
Tiko (ティコ)
Voiced by: Junichi Yanagita (Japanese), Rob Tinkler (English)
Colonel Tripp (トリップ, Torippu)
Voiced by: Jiro Saito (Japanese), Martin Roach (English)

== Development ==
News on a relaunch of the Bakugan property first broke in late 2015 through an investor presentation conducted by Spin Master. Information on the project remained scarce until November 2017 when the company revealed that the new series would launch in 2018/2019. Shortly after, it was discovered that Spin Master had filed a trademark for the name "Bakugan Battle Planet". The following January, Corus Entertainment confirmed its Nelvana subsidiary would again collaborate with TMS Entertainment on the animated series.

In preparation for the relaunch, Spin Master filed patent infringement lawsuits against Alpha Group, GuangZhou Lingdong Creative Culture Technology and Mattel for allegedly violating Bakugan patents in their Screechers Wild, Monster Hunter and Mecard toylines. Spin Master co-CEO Ronnen Harary stated that Bakugan would be reintroduced globally in 2019.

In March 2018, Harary described the new animated series as utilizing an eleven-minute format. This was done at the request of broadcast partner Cartoon Network, who felt the original's 22-minute episode runtime would not appeal to the current generation of kids. A decision to include more comedic elements was also made. A promotional image for the reboot first surfaced in June 2018 through another Spin Master investor document.

Spin Master formally announced Bakugan Battle Planet on October 9, 2018, announcing that Cartoon Network would broadcast the series in the US, Europe, MENA territories, Latin America, Australia and New Zealand, while Teletoon would air the series in Canada. Spin Master also announced that Cartoon Network Enterprises would once again be the franchise's licensing agent outside Asia. In Asia, TMS Entertainment would handle distribution of the series while Takara Tomy would handle the toyline.

On October 16, 2019, it was announced that it was renewed for a second season titled Bakugan: Armored Alliance, which debuted in 2020.

== Media ==
=== Animation ===
Like its predecessor, Bakugan: Battle Planet is an international co-production. The series was produced by Canadian companies Nelvana and Spin Master Entertainment and animated by Japanese studio TMS Entertainment with additional assistance from Studio Hibari. Kazuya Ichikawa directed the series. Kazuhiko Inukai as well as Man of Action Studios act as story editors. The episode scripts are primarily written in Japan, with American writers occasionally contributing. The first season consists of 100 eleven-minute episodes that are also distributed as 50 twenty-two minutes. Nelvana Enterprises handles worldwide distribution outside of Japan and Asia which is handled by TMS.

Bakugan Battle Planet debuted in the United States on Cartoon Network on December 23, 2018, with the first 20 episodes made available on the channel's video-on-demand services in the days prior. The series then had a five-day linear premiere event before settling into its regular slot on January 12, 2019. In Canada, the series launched on Teletoon on December 31, 2018, through a similar five-day premiere stunt before the show debuted in its regular slot on January 12, 2019. Reruns began airing on sister channel YTV on the 11th. In the UK, the series premiered on Cartoon Network on 23 March 2019, with a free-to-air broadcast on Pop following on 2 September. In Australia, the pay-TV premiere occurred on Cartoon Network on 6 April 2019 with a terrestrial broadcast on 9Go! beginning on 14 July.

The first season launched in Japan on TV Tokyo and other TX Network stations on April 1, 2019. The opening theme song is titled "Jounetsu Jamboree" (情熱ジャンボリー, Jōnetsu Janborī; "Passionate Jamboree") with the ending theme is titled "Be my story", both songs performed by HiHi Jets. The Japanese version also features an entirely different musical score composed by Yasuharu Takanashi.

Alongside the television series, Spin Master launched a series of animated web-shorts called Bakugan: Beyond the Brawl on YouTube. They feature the Bakugan creatures in comedic situations.

=== Game ===
Spin Master has launched a new tabletop game that mixes the traditional transforming Bakugan marbles with a full-fledged trading card game. Co-designed by Justin Gary, the game is intended to appeal to both younger audiences and those wanting a competitive scene.

The game launched in January 2019 in Canada and the United States, with additional markets set throughout the rest of the year.

=== Video games ===
In December 2018, Spin Master launched the Bakugan Battle Hub app for iOS and Android devices. It offers character profiles, videos and a simplified version of the tabletop game.

On July 10, 2020, Warner Bros. Interactive Entertainment announced the Bakugan: Champions of Vestroia action role-playing game. Developed by WayForward, it released exclusively on the Nintendo Switch in North America on November 3, 2020.
