= List of programmes broadcast by Pop and sister children's television channels =

The following is a list of programming which was broadcast by Pop, along with its sister channels.

== Final programming ==
=== Pop ===
The channel sourced its programming from multiple production and distribution studios. Programming included original shows such as Swipe It! With Joe Tasker, and acquired programming such as Miraculous: Tales of Ladybug & Cat Noir and Pokémon. The channel also broadcast Barbie media and the Monster High television series.

==== Original programming ====
- Swipe It! With Joe Tasker

==== Acquired programming ====
- 44 Cats
- Alien Monkeys
- Annedroids
- Bakugan
  - Bakugan: Evolutions
  - Bakugan: Geogan Rising
  - Bakugan: Legends
- Barbie: It Takes Two
- Barbie: A Touch of Magic
- Best & Bester
- Care Bears: Unlock the Magic
- Dragon Ball Super (Note: Censored dub; Up to episode 67 since Q3 2023)
- Droners
- EthanGamer
- EthanGamer and Fans Minecraft World
- EthanGamer Plays Roblox
- Grizzy & the Lemmings (also on Boomerang, CBBC and BBC iPlayer)
- The InBESTigators
- Jade Armor
- Kipo and the Age of Wonderbeasts
- Kung Fu Sock
- Lego City Adventures (also on Nickelodeon)
- Lego Dreamzzz: Trials of the Dream Chasers (also on ITVX)
- Lego Friends: Girls on a Mission
- Lego Friends: The Next Chapter
- L.O.L. Surprise! House of Surprises!
- Mermicorno: Starfall
- Miraculous: Tales of Ladybug & Cat Noir (also on Disney+, CBBC and BBC iPlayer)
- Moley
- Monster High (also on Nickelodeon)
- Om Nom Stories
- Operation Ouch!
- PocketWatch Ultimate MishMash
  - Art for Kids Hub
  - Denis
  - LankyBox
- Pokémon
  - Pokémon Master Journeys: The Series
  - Pokémon Ultimate Journeys: The Series
- Polly Pocket
- Power Players
- Power Rangers
  - Power Rangers Dino Fury
- Rainbow Butterfly Unicorn Kitty
- Sadie Sparks
- Shasha & Milo
- She-Ra and the Princesses of Power
- Skylanders Academy
- Squish
- Team Jay
- Total DramaRama (also on CBBC and BBC iPlayer)
- Totally Spies!
- Unicorn Academy
- Yu-Gi-Oh SEVENS

==== Films and specials ====
- Barbie & Chelsea: The Lost Birthday
- Barbie: Big City, Big Dreams
- Barbie: Mermaid Power
- Barbie: Princess Adventure
- Barbie: Spy Squad
- Master Moley By Royal Invitation
- Miraculous World: New York, United Heroez
- Miraculous World: Shanghai, The Legend of Ladydragon
- Monster High: The Movie
- Pokémon: Lucario and the Mystery of Mew
- Pokémon the Movie: Kyurem vs. the Sword of Justice (also on CBBC and BBC iPlayer)
- Pokémon the Movie: Diancie and the Cocoon of Destruction (also on CBBC and BBC iPlayer)
- Pokémon the Movie: Hoopa and the Clash of Ages (also on CBBC and BBC iPlayer)
- Pokémon the Movie: I Choose You! (Note: Uncut dub) (also on CBBC and BBC iPlayer)
- Pokémon the Movie: The Power of Us (also on CBBC and BBC iPlayer)
- Pokémon the Movie: Volcanion and the Mechanical Marvel (also on CBBC and BBC iPlayer)
- Pokémon Ranger and the Temple of the Sea

=== Tiny Pop ===
Tiny Pop aired preschool programs such as Gabby's Dollhouse, Super Wings and PJ Masks.

==== Original programming ====
- DinoCity
- The MiniWhats

==== Acquired programming ====
- Agent Binky: Pets of the Universe
- Apollo's Tall Tales
- Baby Born
- Barbie Dreamhouse Adventures
- Barbie: It Takes Two
- Barbie: A Touch of Magic
- Billy the Cowboy Hamster
- Bubble's Hotel
- Care Bears: Unlock the Magic (2019–2026)
- Caring for Each Other
- Cookie Monster's Foodie Truck
- Cookie's Crumby Pictures
- Dino Ranch
- Ella, Oscar & Hoo
- Elmo and Tango's Mysterious Mysteries
- Elmo's World
- Esme & Roy
- Gabby's Dollhouse
- Gigantosaurus (2020–2026)
- Go! Go! Cory Carson
- GoGo Dino Explorers
- Grizzy & the Lemmings (also on Boomerang, CBBC and BBC iPlayer)
- Gus – The Itsy Bitsy Knight
- Hello Kitty: Super Style!
- Jeremy & Jazzy
- Little Bear (English dub of Pompon Ours)
- Masha and the Bear (also on Cartoonito)
- Me Want Cookie
- Mighty Express (2022–2026)
- Molang (2018–2026)
- Monchhichi
- Mush-Mush and the Mushables
- My Little Pony: Pony Life (2020–2026)
- Petronix Defenders (2022–2026)
- PJ Masks (2017–2026)
- Remy & Boo
- Robocar Poli
- Simon
- Smart Cookies
- Strawberry Shortcake: Berry in the Big City (2022–2026)
- Super Grover 2.0
- Super Wings (2017–2026)
- Trotties
- Tulipop
- Yeti Tales

== Former programming ==
=== Pop ===
- 3 Amigonauts
- The Adventures of Chuck and Friends
- Adventures of Sonic the Hedgehog
- The Adventures of Super Mario Bros. 3
- Alan the Last Dinosaur
- Alvinnn!!! and the Chipmunks (also on Nickelodeon)
- The Amazing Adrenalini Brothers (now on S4C)
- Angry Birds MakerSpace
- Angry Birds Toons
- Animal Exploration with Jarod Miller
- The Animal Shelf
- Archie's Weird Mysteries
- Artzooka!
- The Babaloos
- Babar
- Backyard Science
- Bakugan: Battle Planet
- Barbie Dreamhouse Adventures
- Battle B-Daman
- The Berenstain Bears
- Big Red the Bike
- Big Top Academy
- Big Top Academy: School's Out Edition
- Bimble's Bucket
- Bindi the Jungle Girl
- Blazing Dragons
- Bump in the Night
- Buzz Bumble
- Captain Flinn and the Pirate Dinosaurs
- The Care Bears Family
- Care Bears: Welcome to Care-a-Lot
- Clang Invasion
- Clay Kids
- Clifford the Big Red Dog
- Corduroy
- Cosmic Quantum Ray
- Counterfeit Cat
- Cubix
- Cupcake & Dino: General Services
- Cyberchase
- Dennis the Menace
- Digimon Data Squad
- Dinotrux
- Dr. Dimensionpants
- Eliot Kid
- Ella the Elephant
- Elliot Moose
- Erky Perky
- Fairy Tale Police Department
- Fantomcat
- Finding Stuff Out
- Flatmania
- Freaktown
- Funnymals
- Gasp!
- Gawayn
- The Gees
- George and Martha
- Girlstuff/Boystuff
- Grojband
- Grossology
- H_{2}O: Just Add Water
- Hanazuki: Full of Treasures
- Hareport
- Harry and His Bucket Full of Dinosaurs
- Iggy Arbuckle
- I.N.K. Invisible Network of Kids
- Insectibles
- Inspector Gadget (now on FilmRise)
- Jamie's Got Tentacles!
- Kaleido Star
- Kampung Boy
- Kid Detectives
- Kikoriki
- King
- King Arthur's Disasters
- Kirby: Right Back at Ya!
- Larva
- The Legend of Calamity Jane
- The Legend of White Fang
- LEGO Nexo Knights
- Little Wizard Tao
- Littlest Pet Shop (now on Sky Kids)
- Littlest Pet Shop: A World of Our Own (now on Sky Kids)
- Loggerheads
- Lola & Virginia
- Madeline
- Magi-Nation
- The Magic School Bus
- Marvin the Tap-Dancing Horse
- Mega Man: Fully Charged
- Milly, Molly
- Mischief City
- The Mr. Peabody & Sherman Show
- Mona the Vampire
- My Little Pony: Friendship Is Magic
- Nate Is Late
- The New Adventures of Lassie
- The New Adventures of Nanoboy
- The New Yogi Bear Show
- Noah's Island
- Numb Chucks
- Numberjacks
- Oggy and the Cockroaches
- Oh No! It's an Alien Invasion (now on FilmRise)
- Old Tom
- Oscar's Oasis
- Out of the Box
- Pandalian
- Pat & Stan
- Patrol 03
- Pearlie
- Peg + Cat
- Pigeon Boy
- PINY: Institute of New York
- Pippi Longstocking
- Pirate Express
- Pokémon
  - Pokémon the Series: The Beginning
    - Pokémon: Indigo League
  - Pokémon the Series: Diamond and Pearl (now on CBBC and BBC iPlayer)
    - Pokémon: Diamond and Pearl
    - Pokémon: Diamond and Pearl: Battle Dimension
    - Pokémon: Diamond and Pearl: Galactic Battles
    - Pokémon: Diamond and Pearl: Sinnoh League Victors
  - Pokémon Journeys: The Series
  - Pokémon the Series: Sun & Moon (now on CBBC and BBC iPlayer)
    - Pokémon the Series: Sun & Moon
    - Pokémon the Series: Sun & Moon – Ultra Adventures
    - Pokémon the Series: Sun & Moon – Ultra Legends
  - Pokémon the Series: XY and XYZ (now on BBC iPlayer)
    - Pokémon the Series: XY
    - Pokémon the Series: XY Kalos Quest
    - Pokémon the Series: XYZ
- Power Rangers
  - Power Rangers Beast Morphers
  - Power Rangers Dino Charge
  - Power Rangers Megaforce
  - Power Rangers Ninja Steel
- Rabbids Invasion
- The Raggy Dolls
- Redwall
- Rekkit Rabbit
- Robin Hood: Mischief in Sherwood
- Robinson Sucroe
- Rocky and the Dodos
- Ruby Gloom
- Rupert
- Sabrina: Secrets of a Teenage Witch
- Sally Bollywood
- SamSam
- Santo Bugito
- Scaredy Squirrel (now on FilmRise)
- Seven Little Monsters
- Sherlock Yack
- Shopkins (aired during adverts)
- Slugterra (now on FilmRise)
- The Smurfs
- Snorks
- Sonic the Hedgehog
- Sonic Underground
- Space Chickens in Space
- Sparkle Friends
- Spirit Riding Free
- Stickin' Around
- The Strange Chores
- Super Duper Sumos (2006–2010)
- Super Mario World
- Talking Tom and Friends
- Talking Tom Heroes
- Timothy Goes to School
- Toca Life Stories
- The Tom and Jerry Comedy Show
- Tom & Vicky
- Tracey McBean
- Tractor Tom
- The Transformers
- Transformers: Cyberverse
- Transformers: Rescue Bots
- The Trap Door
- Trollhunters: Tales of Arcadia
- Trolls: The Beat Goes On!
- Tube Mice
- Twipsy
- Vic the Viking
- Voltron: Legendary Defender
- The Wacky World of Tex Avery
- What-A-Mess (DiC version)
- What About Mimi?
- Wild But True
- Wild Kratts
- Winx Club
- The Wizard of Oz
- Yam Roll
- YooHoo & Friends
- Yu-Gi-Oh! Zexal
- Zak Storm
- Zatch Bell!
- Zorro: Generation Z

=== Tiny Pop ===
- 44 Cats
- The Adventures of Paddington Bear
- Aesop's Theatre
- Alphabet Month
- Arpo
- Ava Riko Teo
- The Babaloos
- Babar (now on FilmRise)
- Babar and the Adventures of Badou
- Barbie Dreamtopia
- Benjamin the Elephant
- The Berenstain Bears
- Big Red the Bike
- Billy
- Bindi the Jungle Girl
- Blinky Bill
- Blippi
- Brambly Hedge
- The Busy World of Richard Scarry
- Caillou
- Captain Mack (8 February 2010 – 6 December 2013)
- The Care Bears Family
- Chirp
- Clifford the Big Red Dog
- Cocomelon
- Connie the Cow
- Corduroy
- Cosy Corner
- Cushion Kids
- Dig & Dug with Daisy
- Dive Olly Dive!
- The Doodlebops Rockin' Road Show (6 August 2012 – 1 September 2013)
- Dot.
- Dragon Tales
- Earth to Luna!
- Elliot Moose
- Enchantimals: Tales from Everwilde
- Flipper & Lopaka
- Fraggle Rock
- Franklin
- Franklin and Friends
- Franny's Feet
- George and Martha
- GoGoRiki
- Happy Valley
- Harry and His Bucket Full of Dinosaurs (15 April 2013 – 4 September 2016)
- The Hive
- Hurray for Huckle!
- Jasper the Penguin
- Jay Jay The Jet Plane (18 May 2004 – 18 May 2012)
- Joe and Jack
- Justin Time
- Kipper the Dog
- Lapitch the Little Shoemaker
- Lazy Lucy
- Letters from Felix
- Lilybuds
- Little Bear
- Little Rosey
- Littlest Pet Shop
- Loopdidoo (5 June 2007 – 6 December 2013)
- Madeline
- Marvin the Tap-Dancing Horse
- Maryoku Yummy
- Masha's Tales
- Maya the Bee
- Meg and Mog (18 May 2009 – 6 December 2013)
- Miffy's Adventures Big and Small
- Mike the Knight
- Milly, Molly
- Monkey See Monkey Do (2 May 2011 – 6 December 2013)
- Morphle
- Mumble Bumble
- Mummy Nanny
- My Little Pony
- My Little Pony: Friendship Is Magic (2013–2022)
- Nelly and Caesar
- Noonbory and the Super Seven
- Numberjacks
- PB Bear and Friends
- Peg + Cat (now on Sky Kids)
- Peep and The Big Wide World (2012–2015)
- Pocket Dragon Adventures
- Postman Pat
- The Raggy Dolls (2008–2010)
- Rainbow Fish
- Ranger Rob
- Rolie Polie Olie
- Rubbadubbers (4 July 2005 – 6 December 2013)
- Rupert
- SamSam (2 May 2011 – 6 December 2013)
- Scruff
- See How They Grow
- The Smurfs
- Stella and Sam
- Strawberry Shortcake
- Strawberry Shortcake's Berry Bitty Adventures
- Super Grover 2.0
- Super Why!
- Sydney Sailboat
- Tabaluga
- Timothy Goes to School
- Tip The Mouse
- Toopy and Binoo
- Toybox
- Tractor Tom
- Transformers: Rescue Bots
- Trolls: The Beat Goes On! (also on Sky Kids)
- Trucktown (2016–2018)
- True and the Rainbow Kingdom (2020–2023)
- Vic the Viking
- WellieWishers
- The Wheels on the Bus (5 June 2007 – 6 December 2013)
- Wiggly Park
- Wild Animal Baby Explorers (7 February 2011 – 6 December 2013)
- Wildernuts
- Will and Dewitt (30 December 2009 – 6 December 2013)
- The Wombles
- Woolamaloo
- Zumbers

=== Kix/Pop Max ===
- 100 Deeds for Eddie McDowd
- 3 Amigonauts
- Alvinnn!!! and the Chipmunks (also on Nickelodeon)
- Angry Birds MakerSpace
- Angry Birds Toons
- Annedroids
- Bakugan
- Bakugan: Armored Alliance
- Bakugan: Battle Brawlers (now on FilmRise)
- Bakugan: Battle Planet
- Bakugan: Evolutions
- Bakugan: Geogan Rising
- The Batman
- Batman Beyond
- Beyblade
- Beyblade Metal Fusion (now on YouTube)
  - Beyblade: Metal Fury
  - Beyblade: Metal Fusion
  - Beyblade: Metal Masters
- Beyblade Burst
- Biker Mice from Mars (2006 series)
- Bunny Maloney
- Code Lyoko
- Clay Kids
- Cosmic Quantum Ray
- Counterfeit Cat
- Cupcake & Dino: General Services
- Detentionaire
- Digimon Data Squad
- Dinosaur King
- DinoSquad
- Dr. Dimensionpants
- Dragon Ball GT
- Dragon Ball Super
- Dragon Ball Z
- Dragon Ball Z Kai
- Droners
- The Dukes of Broxstonia
- EthanGamer
- EthanGamer and Fans Minecraft World
- EthanGamer Plays Roblox
- Freaktown
- Get Ace
- Grizzy & the Lemmings
- Grojband
- Hanazuki: Full of Treasures
- The High Fructose Adventures of Annoying Orange
- Inazuma Eleven (seasons 1 and 2 only; now on YouTube)
- The InBESTigators
- Iron Man: Armored Adventures
- Justice League
- Justice League Unlimited
- Kipo and The Age of Wonderbeasts
- Kung Fu Sock
- Lab Rats Challenge
- Legend of the Dragon
- Lego City Adventures
- LEGO Legends of Chima
- LEGO Nexo Knights (now on CITV and ITVX)
- Medabots
- Mega Man: Fully Charged
- Metajets
- Miraculous: Tales of Ladybug & Cat Noir
- The Mr. Peabody & Sherman Show
- Monster High (also on Nickelodeon)
- Monster Warriors
- ¡Mucha Lucha!
- My Dad the Rock Star
- The Mysterious Cities of Gold
- Naruto
- Naruto Shippuden (censored version)
- Nate Is Late
- Ninja Turtles: The Next Mutation
- Numb Chucks
- Oggy and the Cockroaches
- Oh No! It's an Alien Invasion
- Pinky and the Brain
- Pirate Express
- PocketWatch Ultimate MishMash
  - Art For Kids Hub
  - Denis
  - LankyBox
- Pokémon the Series
  - Pokémon the Series: Diamond and Pearl (now on CBBC and BBC iPlayer)
    - Pokémon: Diamond and Pearl
    - Pokémon: Diamond and Pearl: Battle Dimension
    - Pokémon: Diamond and Pearl: Galactic Battles
    - Pokémon: Diamond and Pearl: Sinnoh League Victors
  - Pokémon the Series: Black & White (now on CBBC and BBC iPlayer)
    - Pokémon: Black & White: Rival Destinies
    - Pokémon: Black & White: Adventures in Unova
    - Pokémon: Black & White: Adventures in Unova and Beyond
  - Pokémon Journeys: The Series
  - Pokémon the Series: Sun & Moon (now on CBBC and BBC iPlayer)
    - Pokémon the Series: Sun & Moon
    - Pokémon the Series: Sun & Moon – Ultra Adventures
    - Pokémon the Series: Sun & Moon – Ultra Legends
  - Pokémon the Series: XY and XYZ (to be on BBC iPlayer)
    - Pokémon the Series: XY
    - Pokémon the Series: XY Kalos Quest
    - Pokémon the Series: XYZ
- Pokémon Journeys: The Series
  - Pokémon Journeys: The Series
  - Pokémon Master Journeys: The Series
  - Pokémon Ultimate Journeys: The Series
- Power Players
- Power Rangers
  - Power Rangers Beast Morphers
  - Power Rangers Dino Charge
  - Power Rangers Dino Fury
  - Power Rangers Dino Thunder
  - Power Rangers in Space
  - Power Rangers Jungle Fury
  - Power Rangers Megaforce
  - Power Rangers Mystic Force
  - Power Rangers Ninja Steel
  - Power Rangers Ninja Storm
  - Power Rangers Operation Overdrive
  - Power Rangers R.P.M
  - Power Rangers Samurai
  - Power Rangers S.P.D.
  - Power Rangers Time Force
  - Power Rangers Wild Force
- Rated A for Awesome
- Scan2Go
- Shasha & Milo
  - Shasha & Milo: Shorts
- She-Ra: Princess of Power
- SheZow
- Skylanders Academy
- Slugterra
- Sonic Boom (now on Sky Kids)
- Sonic the Hedgehog
- Sonic Underground
- Space Chickens in Space
- The Spectacular Spider-Man
- Squish
- Storm Hawks
- The Strange Chores
- Swipe It! With Joe Tasker
- Tales from the Cryptkeeper
- Talking Tom & Friends
- Total Drama Island
- Total DramaRama
- The Transformers
- Transformers Cybertron
- Transformers: Rescue Bots
- Trollhunters: Tales of Arcadia
- Trolls: The Beat Goes On!
- Ultimate Muscle
- Voltron: Legendary Defender
- Winston Steinburger and Sir Dudley Ding Dong
- Wolverine and the X-Men
- X-Men: Evolution
- Yu-Gi-Oh!
  - Yu-Gi-Oh!
  - Yu-Gi-Oh! GX
  - Yu-Gi-Oh! Zexal
- Zak Storm

==== Films and specials ====
- Matilda
- Monster High
- Monster High: Electrified
- Pokémon the Movie: Black—Victini and Reshiram and White—Victini and Zekrom (now on CBBC and BBC iPlayer)
- Pokémon the Movie: Genesect and the Legend Awakened (now on CBBC and BBC iPlayer)

=== Pop Girl ===
- 15/Love
- 6teen
- Angela Anaconda (2007–2010)
- Bindi the Jungle Girl
- Black Hole High
- Blue Water High (2010–2014)
- Braceface
- Cake
- Clue
- Dance Revolution
- Dance Studio
- Even Stevens (2008–2013)
- The Fairies
- Family Biz
- Flight 29 Down
- Foreign Exchange
- G2G
- Girlstuff/Boystuff
- H2O: Just Add Water (2010–2014)
- High Flyers
- Horseland
- How to Be Indie
- The Latest Buzz
- Lazy Lucy
- Life with Derek
- Littlest Pet Shop (2012)
- Lizzie McGuire
- Lola & Virginia (2007–2010)
- Madeline (2009–2013)
- Majority Rules!
- Mary-Kate and Ashley in Action!
- Mew Mew Power (2007–2011)
- Missy Mila
- Mortified
- My Babysitter's a Vampire
- My Dad the Rock Star
- My Little Pony: Friendship Is Magic
- Naturally, Sadie (2009–2012)
- The Next Star
- Outriders
- Pearlie
- Pippi Longstocking
- Pop Party
- Pretty Cure (September 2010 – 2012)
- Really Me
- Ruby Gloom (2009–2012)
- Sabrina: The Animated Series (now on FilmRise)
- Sabrina, the Teenage Witch
- Sabrina's Secret Life
- The Saddle Club (2007–2015)
- Sally Bollywood
- Saved by the Bell
- Scout's Safari
- The Sleepover Club (2009–2013)
- Spotlight
- Starla and the Jewel Riders
- Strawberry Shortcake
- Strawberry Shortcake's Berry Bitty Adventures
- Surprise! It's Edible Incredible!
- Totally Spies!
- Trollz
- Two of a Kind
- Unfabulous (2007–2015)
- What About Mimi?
- What's Up Warthogs!
- Winx Club (now on YouTube)
- Z–Squad (2009–2010)
- Zoey 101

=== AnimeCentral ===
- Bleach
- Cowboy Bebop (now on ITVX)
- Fullmetal Alchemist
- Ghost in the Shell: Stand Alone Complex (1st GIG)
- Ghost in the Shell: Stand Alone Complex (2nd GIG)
- G.I. Joe: A Real American Hero
- Gundam SEED
- .hack//SIGN
- Planetes
- s-CRY-ed
- Transformers: The Headmasters
- Transformers: Super-God Masterforce
- Transformers: Victory
- Vision of Escaflowne (now on ITVX)
- Witch Hunter Robin
- Wolf's Rain

== Pop Player exclusive programming ==
- Big Top Academy: School's Out Edition
- EthanGamer (Note: Not a show, but content from YouTuber EthanGamer)
- Talking Tom Heroes
- Total Drama Island

=== Pop Kids programming (only on Samsung TV Plus) ===
- Agent Binky: Pets of the Universe
- Care Bears: Unlock the Magic
- Cookie Monster's Foodie Truck
- Dragon Ball Super
- Kung Fu Sock
- Miraculous: Tales of Ladybug & Cat Noir
- Pokémon
- Simon
- Squish
