= Spotlight =

Spotlight or spot light may refer to:

== Lighting ==
- Spot light, an articulating automotive auxiliary lamp
- Spotlight (theatre lighting)
- Spotlight, a searchlight
- Stage lighting instrument, stage lighting instruments, of several types

== Art, entertainment, and media ==
=== Films ===
- Spotlight (film), a 2015 American drama film
- The Spotlight (film), a 1927 American comedy silent film

=== Music ===
==== Albums ====
- Spotlight, a 2001 album by Tír na nÓg
- Spotlight, a 2007 album by Djumbo
- Spotlight, a 2009 album by Antoine Clamaran
- Spotlight, a 2016 EP by Up10tion

==== Songs ====
- "Spotlight" (Madonna song), 1988
- "Spotlight" (Jennifer Hudson song), 2008
- "Spotlight" (Gucci Mane song), 2009
- "Spotlight" (Mutemath song), 2009
- "Spotlight" (Marshmello and Lil Peep song), 2018
- "Spotlight" (Jessie Ware song), 2020
- "Spotlight" (Xiao Zhan song), 2020
- "Spotlight", song by Kylie Minogue from the album Disco, 2020
- "Spotlight". song by The Sweet from the album Funny How Sweet Co-Co Can Be, 1971
- "Spotlight", song by Selena Gomez & the Scene from the album A Year Without Rain, 2010
- "Spotlight", song by Shakira from the album Shakira, 2014
- "Spotlight", song by Fayray, 2005
- "Spotlightz", song by XO-IQ, featured in the television series Make It Pop

=== Periodicals ===
- Spotlight, British publication founded in 1927, to connect theatre directors and casting directors with actors
- SPOTLIGHT, Con Edison's newsletter
- The Spotlight, a weekly American newspaper, now out of print

=== Television ===
- Spotlight (BBC News), BBC's regional news programme for the southwest of England
- Spotlight (BBC Northern Ireland television programme), a current affairs programme in Northern Ireland
- Spotlight (Canadian TV program), a 1975 Canadian current affairs television program that aired on CBC
- Spotlight (South Korean TV series), a 2008 South Korean television series that aired on Munhwa Broadcasting Corporation (MBC)
- Spotlight (TV channel), a defunct premium movie channel
- Spotlight TV, a British music channel
- Spotlight 2 (web series), an Indian web series

== Enterprises and organizations ==
- Spotlight (Boston Globe), a newspaper investigative team, in US
- Spotlight (company), a UK casting service company featuring directories of actors and actresses
- Spotlight Group, Australian retail conglomerate
- Spotlight PA, investigative reporting partnership of Pennsylvania news organizations

== Technology ==
- Spotlight (Apple), search technology integrated into macOS and iOS
- DBpedia Spotlight, named entity extraction for DBpedia resources
- Spotlight SAR, a technique to improve resolution for synthetic-aperture radar
- SpotLight GPS Pet Locator, a product of Positioning Animals Worldwide
- Windows Spotlight

== Other ==
- Spotlight effect, phenomenon in which people tend to believe they are being noticed more than they really are
- Celebrity, the spotlight

== See also ==
- Light (disambiguation)
- Limelight (disambiguation)
- Spot (disambiguation)
