= Limelight (disambiguation) =

Limelight is a type of stage lighting used during the nineteenth century.

Limelight may also refer to:

== Films ==
- Limelight Department, an Australian film studio
- Limelight (1936 film), a British film starring Anna Neagle
- Limelight (1952 film), a film by and starring Charlie Chaplin
- Limelight, a 2009 television film starring Oded Fehr
- Limelight (2011 film), a documentary by Jen Gatien and Billy Corben

== Music ==
- LimeLight, former name of Madein, a South Korean pop group
- Limelight (club night), a classical club night at the 100 Club, Soho, London
- Limelight (magazine), an Australian music, arts and culture magazine
- Limelight: The Story of Charlie Chaplin, a 2010 musical by Christopher Curtis
- Limelight Records, a record label
- Limelights, fans of the band Why Don't We

=== Albums ===
- Limelight, by Steve Taylor, 1986
- Limelight (Marti Webb album), 2003
- Limelight (Colin James album), 2005

=== Songs ===
- "Limelight", by XTC from Drums and Wires, 1979
- "Limelight" (song), by Rush, 1981
- "Limelight", by the Alan Parsons Project from Stereotomy, 1985
- "Limelight", by Two Hours Traffic from their 2005 self-titled debut album
- "Limelight", by Alizée from Une enfant du siècle, 2010
- "Limelight", by Reks from Rhythmatic Eternal King Supreme, 2011
- "Limelight", by Agnes, 2019

== Venues ==
- Limelight (Belfast), a nightclub and music venue in Belfast
- Limelight (Montreal), a nightclub and music venue in Montreal
- The Limelight, a chain of nightclubs
- Limelight Gallery and Coffeehouse, a New York City photography gallery 1954–1961

== Other uses ==
- Limelight (health centre), a health centre in England
- Limelight Editions, an imprint owned by book publisher Rowman & Littlefield
- Limelight Networks, a digital media content delivery network

== See also ==
- Light (disambiguation)
- Lime (disambiguation)
- The Limeliters, an American folk-singing group
- Lime Point Light, lighthouse at Lime Point
- Spotlight (disambiguation)
