= The Babaloos =

1995 Canadian-French TV series or program

- Title screen
- Genre: Animated series
- Countries of origin: Canada; France
- Original language: English
- No. of episodes: 105

Production
- Running time: 4–5 minutes
- Production companies: CINAR Films; France Animation; Ravensburger Film + TV

Original release
- Network: CBC Television (Canada); TVOntario (Canada); Canal J (France); France 3 (France)
- Release: February 7, 1995 – January 23, 1998

The Babaloos is an animated series produced by CINAR Films, France Animation, and Ravensburger Film + TV.

== Plot ==
The show is about a group of home appliances that live in a suburban house. They are nocturnal, meaning they are able to sleep in the day and be awake in the night. Among these characters are staunch Mrs. Fork, gentle Spoon, cheerful Mr. Bowl, curious Baby Towel, his caring mother Mommy Towel, and adventurous and intelligent Pencil. In each episode, they encounter an everyday problem that they must conquer before Kevin, the boy living in the house, wakes up.

== Characters ==
=== Main ===
- Mrs. Fork (voiced by Julie Lemieux) -
- Spoon (voiced by Dan Hennessey) -
- Mr. Bowl (voiced by John Stocker)
- Sponge (voiced by Stephanie Morgenstern) -
- Mother Towel (voiced by Tracey Moore) -
- Baby Towel (voiced by Cedric Smith) -
- Screwdriver (voiced by Annick Obonsawin) -
- Pencil (voiced by Bruce Dinsmore) -
- Miss Toothbrush (voiced by Stacey DePass) -
- Alarm clock (voiced by Joseph Motiki) -
- Slipper (voiced by Alyson Court) -
- Shovel (voiced by Colin Fox) -
- Fishing Rod (voiced by Scott Wentworth) -
- Hammer (voiced by Neil Crone) -

== Telecast ==
The series aired first on CBC. The series aired on Cartoon Network in the United States as part of Small World. The series also aired on Kika (Germany), Club Súper 3 (Spain) and Canal J (France).
