= Kung Fu Sock =

Chinese animated television series

- Promotional poster
- Also known as: Kung Fu Sock
- Genre: Fantasy; Comedy; Action; Magical girl
- Written by: Bo Fan; Xin Zheng
- Directed by: Bo Fan
- Composers: Bo Fan; Jordan Matthew Cox; Rich J. Dickerson
- Country of origin: China
- Original language: Mandarin
- No. of seasons: 1
- No. of episodes: 52

Production
- Executive producers: James Chen Gu; Selina She
- Producers: Thirty Sun; Xiaoqiu Zhong; Suman Wang
- Running time: 11 minutes
- Production companies: UYoung; Tencent Penguin Pictures

Original release
- Network: Tencent Video; CCTV-14
- Release: 3 August 2021 – present

Kung Fu Sock
- Simplified Chinese: 天真与功夫袜
- Traditional Chinese: 天真與功夫襪
Transcriptions
Standard Mandarin
- Hanyu Pinyin: Tiānzhēn yǔ Gōngfu Wà

Kung Fu Wa! (known as Kung Fu Sock in the English Dub; Chinese: 天真与功夫袜; pinyin: Tiān Zhēn Yǔ Gōng Fū Wà) is a Chinese animated children's television series produced by UYoung Media and Tencent Penguin Pictures. The series follows a young girl who is bestowed with superpowers through the aid of a martial arts master turned into an anthropomorphic sock.

The first season premiered on 3 August 2021 on Tencent Video in China, and on 25 July 2022 on Pop in the United Kingdom, as part of Pop's Silly Selfie Summer. On August 31, 2022, the series was renewed for a second and final season.

== Synopsis ==
Eight-year-old Tee Zeng finds an unusual sock that is actually a Kung Fu master named Kung Fu Wa from another world. Wearing the sock transforms Tee Zeng into super heroine Kung Fu Girl. She and Kung Fu Wa must complete missions and protect their home, Starry Island.

== Characters ==
- Tee Zeng (alternatively named Tea Zen or TZ (English dub) and Tee Yang (Spanish dub); voiced by Zhou Zhou (Chinese), Sofia Gomez (English) and Belén Marín (Spanish)) – an 8-year-old girl who lives above her family's laundrette, who turns into Kung Fu Girl through the aid of Master Kicko
- Master Kicko (alternatively named Kung Fu Wa (English dub); voiced by Fu Bowen (Chinese), Alex Teixeira (English) and Juan Pablo Muñoz (Spanish)) – a Kung Fu master who was transformed into a sock
- Hiro Hao/Sword Master (voiced by Jiasi Li (Chinese), Alex Machado (English) and Óscar Olivares (Spanish)) – Tee Zeng's friend from school
- Manipulens (also known as Evil Star Lord; voiced by Zhankun Zhang (Chinese), Travis Roig (English) and Cristóbal Areite (Spanish)) – Kicko's rival who was transformed into a pair of glasses
- Min (voiced by Mu Qiu (Chinese), Dariana Fustes (English) and Niksi Marín (Spanish)) – Tee Zeng's introverted, but adventurous best friend
- Tee Zeng's mom (voiced by Chenjie Xiong (Chinese), Ghia Burns (English) and Betsabé Gutiérrez (Spanish)) – the owner of a local laundromat in Starry Island

== Episodes ==
No.	Title	Written by	Storyboarded by	Original release date	Pop (UK) release date	Prod. code
1	"A Sock with Kung Fu"	Unknown	TBA	August 3, 2021	July 25, 2022	TBA
2	"First Day at School"	Unknown	TBA	August 3, 2021	July 25, 2022	TBA
3	"Dragonface"	Unknown	TBA	August 3, 2021	July 26, 2022	TBA
4	"Home Not So Alone"	Unknown	TBA	August 3, 2021	July 27, 2022	TBA
5	"Rainbow Cat"	Unknown	TBA	August 10, 2021	July 28, 2022	TBA
6	"Fishing"	Unknown	TBA	August 10, 2021	July 29, 2022	TBA
7	"Bun House Mystery"	Unknown	TBA	August 17, 2021	August 1, 2022	TBA
8	"Old Comb"	Unknown	TBA	August 17, 2021	August 2, 2022	TBA
9	"Daddy's Gift"	Unknown	TBA	August 24, 2021	August 3, 2022	TBA
10	"Wishing Well"	Unknown	TBA	August 24, 2021	August 4, 2022	TBA
11	"Relaxation With Tee Zeng"	Unknown	TBA	August 31, 2021	August 5, 2022	TBA
12	"Manipulens: Part 1"	Unknown	TBA	August 31, 2021	August 8, 2022	TBA
13	"Manipulens: Part 2"	Unknown	TBA	September 7, 2021	August 9, 2022	TBA
14	"Master and Student"	Unknown	TBA	September 7, 2021	August 10, 2022	TBA
15	"Sword Hero's Arrival"	Unknown	TBA	September 14, 2021	August 11, 2022	TBA
16	"New Classmate"	Unknown	TBA	September 14, 2021	August 12, 2022	TBA
17	"Kung Fu Girl's Show"	Unknown	TBA	September 21, 2021	August 15, 2022	TBA
18	"The Magician"	Unknown	TBA	September 21, 2021	August 16, 2022	TBA
19	"Hero's Defeat"	Unknown	TBA	September 28, 2021	August 17, 2022	TBA
20	"The Duel"	Unknown	TBA	September 28, 2021	August 18, 2022	TBA
21	"Cyber Battle"	Unknown	TBA	October 5, 2021	August 19, 2022	TBA
22	"Animal Shelter Encounter"	Unknown	TBA	October 5, 2021	August 22, 2022	TBA
23	"Cave Rescue"	Unknown	TBA	October 12, 2021	August 23, 2022	TBA
24	"Kung Fu Sock's Injury"	Unknown	TBA	October 12, 2021	August 24, 2022	TBA
25	"Night of the Shooting Stars"	Unknown	TBA	October 19, 2021	August 25, 2022	TBA
26	"Hao's Disappearance"	Unknown	TBA	October 19, 2021	August 26, 2022	TBA
27	"Hao's Secret"	Unknown	TBA	January 4, 2022	December 5, 2022	TBA
28	"Hao's Memory"	Unknown	TBA	January 4, 2022	December 5, 2022	TBA
29	"Wake Up, Hao"	Unknown	TBA	January 11, 2022	December 6, 2022	TBA
30	"Broken Glass"	Unknown	TBA	January 11, 2022	December 6, 2022	TBA
31	"Sweet vs. Spicy"	Unknown	TBA	January 18, 2022	December 7, 2022	TBA
32	"Who is Kung Fu Girl?"	Unknown	TBA	January 18, 2022	December 7, 2022	TBA
33	"A Cold Day"	Unknown	TBA	January 25, 2022	December 8, 2022	TBA
34	"Friendship Repair"	Unknown	TBA	January 25, 2022	December 8, 2022	TBA
35	"The Board Game"	Unknown	TBA	February 1, 2022	December 9, 2022	TBA
36	"Hero Manipulens"	Unknown	TBA	February 1, 2022	December 9, 2022	TBA
37	"The Lotus Pond"	Unknown	TBA	February 8, 2022	December 12, 2022	TBA
38	"Hao's Plan"	Unknown	TBA	February 8, 2022	December 12, 2022	TBA
39	"Hao's Return"	Unknown	TBA	February 15, 2022	December 13, 2022	TBA
40	"Student and Master"	Unknown	TBA	February 15, 2022	December 13, 2022	TBA
41	"Manipulens' Past"	Unknown	TBA	February 22, 2022	December 14, 2022	TBA
42	"Team Work"	Unknown	TBA	February 22, 2022	December 14, 2022	TBA
43	"Dear Diary"	Unknown	TBA	March 1, 2022	December 15, 2022	TBA
44	"Tee Zeng's Birthday"	Unknown	TBA	March 1, 2022	December 15, 2022	TBA
45	"Thunder Storm"	Unknown	TBA	March 8, 2022	December 16, 2022	TBA
46	"Kung Fu Girl's Defeat"	Unknown	TBA	March 8, 2022	December 16, 2022	TBA
47	"Escape"	Unknown	TBA	March 15, 2022	December 19, 2022	TBA
48	"What If"	Unknown	TBA	March 15, 2022	December 19, 2022	TBA
49	"Game Over"	Unknown	TBA	March 22, 2022	December 20, 2022	TBA
50	"Kung Fu Sock's Plan"	Unknown	TBA	March 22, 2022	December 20, 2022	TBA
51	"Final Battle"	Unknown	TBA	March 29, 2022	December 21, 2022	TBA
52	"The Most Powerful Kung Fu"	Unknown	TBA	March 29, 2022	December 21, 2022	TBA

== Broadcast ==
The series was first released on Tencent Video in China in August 2021. In June of that year, Federation Kids & Family, the family entertainment subsidiary of Paris-based film distributor Federation Studios, acquired the program’s distribution rights for most international markets; UYoung Media, however, would maintain foreign distribution rights for the Latin America market.

In April 2022, UYoung reached a deal with Discovery Kids Latin America to distribute localized dubs of the program in Portuguese (Brazil) and Spanish (for other Latin American markets). The Spanish dub premiered linearly on Discovery Kids on April 11, 2022, while the Brazilian Portuguese dub debuted on the regional version of the Discovery+ streaming service eleven days later on April 22. That same month, Federation reached a deal with British/Irish children’s networks Pop and Pop Max for the rights to an English-language dub of the series. The English version, given the modified title Kung Fu Sock, debuted on Pop on July 25, 2022.

A Russian dub was released via streaming on Kinopoisk on December 1, 2022 and ivi on December 3, 2022; fledgling family entertainment channel FamilyJam acquired the linear television rights to the Russian dub in early 2023.
