= Bakugan: Geogan Rising =

- Season 3
- No. of episodes: 26 (52 segments)

Release
- Original network: Teletoon (CA); Netflix (US); YouTube (JP); 9Go! (AU)
- Original release: January 24 – September 12, 2021

Season chronology
- ← Previous; Bakugan: Armored Alliance Next → Bakugan: Evolutions

Bakugan: Geogan Rising (爆(ばく)丸(がん)ジオガンライジング, Bakugan Jiogan Raijingu) is the third season of the animated television series Bakugan: Battle Planet. It was formally announced in November 2020 and consists of 52 eleven-minute episodes (26 twenty two-minute episodes).

The season debuted in Canada on Teletoon on January 24, 2021, and was later rebroadcast on YTV starting March 5, 2021. On March 12, 2021, the Japanese version debuted bi-weekly on April 2, 2021. Netflix streamed the first half of Bakugan: Geogan Rising on April 15, 2021. The second half was released on Roblox on September 8, 2021, and on Netflix on September 15, 2021.

== Episode list ==
No. overall	No. in season	English Title Japanese title	Original release date	Japanese release date
205	1a	"Drago Returns!"; Transliteration: "Dorago Fukkatsu!" (Japanese: ドラゴ復活！)	January 24, 2021 (CAN); April 15, 2021 (US)	April 2, 2021
Six months after defeating Haavik, the Awesome Brawlers have returned to their normal lives so far, but still remain sad because all of their Bakugan had to go into a years long hibernation, following the battle against Sabrus. Everything starts off with the AB attempting to shoot new videos for their channel, to no avail because it's just not the same without their Bakugan since they had to go into a years long hibernation to begin with. Still depressed over missing their Bakugan partners, Dan suggests that they go visit them in Vestroia despite the other AB small objections because they promised to wait for their return, but they eventually agree. Wynton activates the mobile gate, but just before they can enter it, a strange light flashes before their eyes, causing the gate to collapse all of a sudden, much to everyone's shock. The next day, Wynton tells the AB that he spent all night working on the mobile gate with Benton, but couldn't find anything wrong with it. He deduces that Vestroia could have done this. Suddenly, they encounter Chad and Chester again where Chad reveals that they have started their own video channel, hoping to get a lot of views from the videos they make. He challenges them to a battle, but without their Bakugan, the AB are unable to brawl. They manage to set up the Drome in time to prevent any destruction from happening so far. However, during the ensuing brawl, Crakanoid accidentally causes damage to the Drome, which has never happened before, much to the AB's shock, worried that the buildings will get permanently damaged in the process if this keeps up. Crakanoid continues to cause damage to the Drome, but in a shocking turn of events, a gateway opens up, and much to Dan's surprise, Drago suddenly emerges from it. Now reunited with his partner, Dan makes a comeback and successfully defeats Chad. However, Crakanoid suddenly disappears after a gate appears and drags him down below, leaving the AB and Drago bewildered by what they have just witnessed.
206	1b	"The Bakugan of Junk Island"; Transliteration: "Garakuta Shima no Bakugan" (Japanese: ガラクタ島の爆丸)	January 24, 2021 (CAN); April 15, 2021 (US)	April 2, 2021
The AB are thrilled that Drago is back, but remain concerned about the other Bakugan still hibernating. Drago begins to explain that they shared their remaining strength with him, which is why he was able to return earlier in the first place. He also explains that while they were waiting for their life force to recover, they sensed a strange occurrence. The connection that keeps Earth and Vestroia fused together is starting to weaken. This explains why the AB couldn't enter the maze in the first place; the portal collapsed before they could enter it. Drago was the only one who found an unstable gate and managed to get through it, barely, while also discovering the malfunction in the Drome, and the disappearance of that Bakugan (which was Crakanoid). He deduces that these events are connected to these strange occurrences to begin with. Because of that, the AB can't go to Vestroia, nor can their Bakugan return. However, Wynton reveals that he has found a way to get to Vestroia, and it is revealed that he has summoned Benton to assist them. It is also revealed that they have built and developed a new mobile gate which will allow the AB to travel to Vestroia. They test it out and manage to get it working (the first test didn't work, but the second one did) as the AB enter the gate despite Benton attempting to warn them that the gateway is still unstable, and that passing through it would be dangerous, but the AB assure him that they'll come back safe and sound. Reaching their destination, the AB at first believe that they're still on Earth when they discover a huge junk pile, but Drago confirms that they're definitely on Vestroia. While trying to figure out how all these items from Earth ended up in Vestroia, the AB encounter new Bakugan, consisting of Sharktar, Fenneca, Falcron, Ferascal, and Pincitaur fighting over the Earth items at first, believing that they're treasures to them (they also think that the AB are treasures to them as well). Surrounded by the new Bakugan, Dan battles them, but since Drago is outmatched and is starting to get tired in the process, Wynton opens up a gate in their attempt to escape from them. The Bakugan try to catch the AB, but Drago stops them and advises them to go through the gate while he holds them off. He manages to push them back, giving him and the AB enough time to get through the gate and back up to the surface. However, the Bakugan have managed to follow them through the gateway, much to their complete shock.
207	2a	"Lia and Fenneca"; Transliteration: "Ria to Feneka" (Japanese: リアとフェネカ)	January 31, 2021 (CAN); April 15, 2021 (US)	April 16, 2021
The Bakugan that followed the AB back to Earth start causing chaos in Studio D. Fenneca, having had enough of this, runs away with Lia pursuing her. She manages to catch up to her after she inadvertently crashes into a windshield of a car, only to be blamed for the damage by a passerby. However, Everett arrives and offers to pay for the damage, much to Lia's suspicion. He challenges her to a Bakugan battle which Fenneca accepts despite Lia attempting to warn her that she might disappear if she loses, which she brushes off easily, saying that she has no intention of losing this battle. Arriving at their destination, Everett points out that this battle zone is the perfect place for a Bakugan battle because no damage will occur here since the Dromes are no longer functioning properly. He also reveals that he's streaming this battle live due to the phenomenon that's occurring where Bakugan disappear after they lose a battle. Suddenly, Duran shows up ready to battle Lia despite her warning about the Bakugan disappearing after losing a battle, which he is already aware of, intending to defeat her so that it won't happen to him. During the battle, Fenneca refuses to allow Lia to guide her, thinking that she can handle this by herself (she also blames her for distracting her in the battle), resulting in an argument between the two. The AB, having found out about the battle between Lia and Duran arrive to watch it. Duran, deciding to use their argument to his advantage, makes a comeback, and successfully defeat's Fenneca. At first, Lia thinks she's going to disappear, but she doesn't, much to her shock. Lia reminds Fenneca that she could have won if they fought together, but again, Fenneca refuses her proposal and ends up blaming her for losing the battle, resulting in another argument. From afar, Everett contacts a mysterious man that he's most likely working for, having seen his live stream. He becomes interested in the idea of Bakugan that don't follow rules and decides to use this opportunity for his upcoming plan.
208	2b	"Lightning and Ferascal"; Transliteration: "Raitoningu to Ferasukaru" (Japanese: ライトニングとフェラスカル)	January 31, 2021 (CAN); April 15, 2021 (US)	April 16, 2021
Ferascal starts to mess with Lightning while the AB talk with Benton about why Fenneca didn't disappear after she lost the battle against Duran. He suspects that the phenomenon only happens with Fenneca and wants to examine her more closely in order to learn more about this occurrence, much to her annoyance. Since Fenneca came from Junk Island, the AB theorize that the same thing won't happen to the other Bakugan. The only way to test out that theory is to lose on purpose, and then find out whether they disappear or not, which Shun believes that they shouldn't do because it's too risky. Suddenly, a mysterious girl appears in Studio D all of a sudden, much to the AB's shock. Lia recognizes her as Crystal Blue who is known as "The Bakugan Girl" who has psychic abilities that allow her to read the minds of people and animals; she can also track down Bakugan as well. Crystal Blue begins to explain that the reason she came here was because she sensed a power coming from the Bakugan that followed the AB back to Earth and asks them to show her what a Bakugan battle is like. Lia happily agrees, thinking that Crystal Blue might learn more about Fenneca and the other Bakugan with her psychic powers. This leads to a battle between her and Dan. The AB reveal to Crystal Blue that since Drago is at risk of disappearing, he plans to carry out this battle smoothly so that he won't end up defeating Fenneca. He'll know when to stop the battle at that exact point. The battle commences as Fenneca gains the upper hand on Drago. However, Ferascal decides to take part in the battle as well. Although Lightning is reluctant, he eventually joins in on Lia's urging. Fenneca, annoyed by Ferascal's interference attempts to defeat her, but she uses her deception tactics to her advantage. She then turns her attention on Drago who lands a huge attack on her, knocking her out in the process. However, Ferascal strikes back hard against him, and it is revealed that she tricked Drago into thinking that she was defeated, which she used to her advantage. She also saddens Lightning when she says that she doesn't need his help, thinking that she can handle this battle on her own. Nearing the end, Drago accidentally defeats Ferascal. Lightning at first fears that she might disappear, but she doesn't all of a sudden, all while tricking him, angering Lightning in the process. This proves that the other Bakugan won't disappear whenever they lose a battle. Much to the AB's shock, they discover that Crystal Blue has disappeared. Elsewhere, she contacts the mysterious man and informs him that the new Bakugan that came from Vestroia don't disappear, who in turn becomes satisfied with the news so far.
209	3a	"A Former Thief and a Laid Back Dude"; Transliteration: "Pinchi Taurā no Himitsu" (Japanese: ピンチタウラーの秘密)	February 7, 2021 (CAN); April 15, 2021 (US)	April 30, 2021
The AB are waiting for Dan to get out of class since he was the one that suggested shooting a video after school today. Ajit on the other hand goes to check on Pincitaur who is proven to have a laid back personality. Ferascal explains that there's more to Pincitaur that he doesn't know about and warns him not to make him angry. Suddenly, the AB discover Strata who plans to capture their Bakugan in order to make a fortune. He captures Fenneca and Ferascal, puts them under his control with his new device, and initiates a Baku-battle, hoping to capture the others as well. Determined to get them back, Ajit and Wynton decide to battle Strata. During the battle, Falcron refuses to listen to Wynton while Ajit has trouble getting Pincitaur to battle due to the latter's laid back personality. He doesn't even realize that Fenneca and Ferascal are being controlled by Strata. With Falcron at the brink of defeat, Ajit finally comes up with an idea. He suddenly angers Pincitaur who gains the upper hand on Fenneca and Ferascal, and it is revealed that earlier, Ferascal told Ajit that Pincitaur gets angry when he's mistaken for a scorpion, and that in reality, he's actually a sandcrab. Using this to his advantage, Ajit pins the blame on Strata, causing Pincitaur to chase after him in anger, while also defeating Fenneca and Ferascal, thus freeing them from Strata's control. In the meantime, Dan meets up with everyone after class and witnesses Pincitaur getting rid of Strata, much to his surprise.
210	3b	"My Name is Sharktar"; Transliteration: "Ore no na wa Shākutā" (Japanese: 俺の名はシャークター)	February 7, 2021 (CAN); April 15, 2021 (US)	April 30, 2021
Following the battle against Strata, the AB and their Bakugan clean up the school since the Drome wasn't able to fix it in the first place. Meanwhile, Shun and Sharktar travel to a remote island and meet up with Masato who refused Shun's request earlier to use Kazami's technology to stabilize the Drome, thinking that it's no longer needed. He begins to explain that he is aware of the Bakugan disappearing after losing battles, making them too dangerous in the process, therefore, a movement has been established to ban all outdoor battles. He then shows Shun a satellite defense system that the company has been working on that will be able to detect universal threats since Haavik threatened to destroy Earth and Vestroia to begin with. The whole point of this system is to identify these threats so that they can be prepared if those threats ever come to Earth. It will send out special electromagnetic waves that can stop any life forms in its tracks. Masato believes that with this system, they will no longer have to rely on Bakugan. Suddenly, an intruder blinds Shun and Masato with a smokescreen, steals the satellite controls, and flees with Shun in pursuit. He manages to catch up to him, revealed to be McQ who manages to escape in the ensuing chase. Convinced by Sharktar, Shun sends him to intercept McQ and prevent his escape. He starts attacking him and Cycloid, causing McQ to attempt to escape with an escape pod. Shun arrives to help Sharktar who refuses his help at first, thinking that he can handle this battle on his own. In order to turn the tides on this battle, McQ orders Cycloid to attack the submarine with Shun and Masato still inside, but Sharktar defends them. Nearly defeated because he keeps moving in the same predictable way, which has given McQ a bit of an advantage, Shun advises Sharktar to change things up a bit by doing something unpredictable, like the jellyfish that drift with the ocean currents. When Cycloid attacks again, Sharktar manages to evade his attacks by drifting with the current, giving him the upper hand in the process, causing McQ and Cycloid to retreat for now. In the aftermath, Masato has come to realize the bond that humans and Bakugan share together. Therefore, he decides to launch an investigation on the Drome immediately, much to Shun's delight.
211	4a	"Wynton's Friend"; Transliteration: "Ten'nyūsei Haketto" (Japanese: 転入生・ハケット)	February 14, 2021 (CAN); April 15, 2021 (US)	May 14, 2021
A new student named Jenny Hackett is introduced to the class, including the AB. She soon becomes infatuated with Wynton because she is a big fan of his work based on Bakugan, having watched the AB videos. She is also infatuated with the Bakugan that don't vanish. In sadness, Jenny reveals to the AB that she found out about the Bakugan disappearing after losing battles and wants to help prevent this phenomenon from happening (in other words, finding the source of this occurrence). Wynton decides to ask for her help and takes her to his research lab set up by Benton. He explains that he's working on an improved version of the mobile gate which they can use to travel to Vestroia and find out why the Bakugan are disappearing after losing battles. Falcron begins to have suspicions about Jenny, but Wynton dismisses them. He and Jenny begin their work on the mobile gate and manage to complete it in working condition. Seeing how tired Wynton is, she suggests that they rest up for the night before heading back to the AB; Wynton agrees. While resting up, Jenny takes the mobile gate, only to be confronted by Falcron who deduces her true nature; her plan was to steal the mobile gate all along. In a shocking revelation, Jenny destroys Wynton's equipment and escapes with the mobile gate, alerting his presence in the process. Wynton and Falcron chase after her as she summons a Haos Cyndeous to hold them off. However, Wynton becomes torn between stopping Jenny or saving Falcron despite Falcron urging him to stop Jenny. Eventually, he decides to save Falcron who successfully defeats Cyndeous before he disappears. Even though Falcron is upset with Wynton for allowing Jenny to get away with the mobile gate, he says that he can always build another one. Elsewhere, Jenny gives the mobile gate to the mysterious man who plans to use it to travel to Vestroia and capture as many Bakugan as possible.
212	4b	"Magnus Returns!"; Transliteration: "Magunasu Futatabi" (Japanese: マグナス再び)	February 14, 2021 (CAN); April 15, 2021 (US)	May 14, 2021
The AB discuss the events that happened with Wynton when Jenny stole his mobile gate and destroyed the equipment in his lab; he can always build another one despite his explanation that it's not that easy to build. Suddenly, they discover a Ventus Cubbo who has kidnapped Emily all of a sudden and chase after it. It takes her to the battle zone where it is revealed that Everett and Strata have orchestrated her capture as they attempt to force her to battle against Strata. Everett reminds her about the phenomenon that occurs where Bakugan disappear after losing in battle, which has brought a sudden decrease on Brawlers willing to battle, afraid that they'll lose their Bakugan if they do so. This means that there are fewer people out there watching battles. Emily fears that if she loses this battle, her Bakugan will disappear. However, the AB arrive where Dan decides to battle Strata despite Lia's objections, out of fear that Drago will disappear if he loses. During the battle, Strata gains the upper hand on Dan. Before Emily can join in because she blames herself for getting Drago into this mess, much to her and the AB's surprise, Magnus arrives to deal with Strata, much to his complete shock. Everett becomes happy in the process because he believes that Drago and Nillious battling together will get him higher ratings. However, Magnus orders Nillious to destroy the cameras, thus ending the live stream, then he tells Dan to stand down because he intends to defeat Strata on his own. Continuing on with the battle, Magnus gains the upper hand on Strata, having gotten stronger than last time and successfully defeats Krakelios who then disappears (Cubbo is also defeated when he chooses to give up), causing Strata to flee in anger. In the aftermath, Magnus explains to everyone, including Emily that he has been building up his strength for his upcoming battle with Dan, still holding an intention to settle their score someday in the future. He then flies off to parts unknown, leaving the AB and Emily happy for his return.
213	5a	"Gregorius Reed Arrives"; Transliteration: "Hīringu Koaseru" (Japanese: ヒーリング・コアセル)	February 21, 2021 (CAN); April 15, 2021 (US)	May 28, 2021
Drago tells Dan that he received a message from Pyravian and asks him to contact the other AB for him, much to his confusion. They follow him to where the Healing Core Cell is located where he explains that Pyravian told him that a human with malicious intent came to Vestroia and stole the Healing Core Cell which he took back to Earth and advised him to find and recover that Core Cell at any cost. Arriving at the location, revealed to be a huge estate, Lia recognizes the place belonging to Gregorius Reed, a famous billionaire and a Bakugan collector. Not knowing what he'll do with the Core Cell, the AB become determined to find and recover it no matter what. They decide to split up to cover more ground, which will make the search faster, but they are soon ambushed by Strata, Everett, and Crystal Blue who are revealed to be working for Reed. They attempt to stop them from interfering with Reed's plan, but despite their best efforts, the AB manage to defeat them all, which includes Lia and Lightning improving their relationships with Fenneca and Ferascal (Strata is almost defeated, but he just flees for now). Suddenly, a tremor occurs as Wynton and Falcron investigate the source, leading them to an underground stairway which they prepare to enter.
214	5b	"A Mysterious Bakugan"; Transliteration: "Densetsu no Sonzai" (Japanese: 伝説の存在)	February 21, 2021 (CAN); April 15, 2021 (US)	May 28, 2021
Wynton and Falcron enter the underground passageway which leads them to a hidden laboratory. There, they discover the Healing Core Cell. Jenny confronts them, and Wynton deduces that she obtained it by using the mobile gate that she stole from him. Reed appears and reveals that he plans to make his dream a reality by using the Healing Core Cell to control a different kind of Bakugan species called Geogan since he couldn't find the perfect Bakugan for himself to begin with. A battle ensues between Wynton and Jenny who is determined to prevent him from stopping Reed's experiment. In the meantime, Reed begins to extract the Healing Core Cell's power in an attempt to obtain the Geogan. Jenny tries to warn Reed that he's overloading the Core Cell, but he ignores her and continues the extraction, causing the Core Cell to shatter all of a sudden. Suddenly, a strange Baku-core appears near Jenny which she uses to summon her Geogan called Mutasect, and it is revealed that these creatures have existed on Vestroia since ancient times. Mutasect easily overpowers Falcron due to his extraordinary power, nearly defeating him in the process before disappearing. Realizing that they don't stand a chance against Jenny now because of her Geogan that overpowered Falcron, Wynton calls for a retreat, much to Falcron's disappointment as they fly away in shock due to the existence of Geogan.
215	6a	"The Search for Geogan!"; Transliteration: "Jiogan" (Japanese: ジオガン)	February 28, 2021 (CAN); April 15, 2021 (US)	June 11, 2021
The AB discuss the event that happened last night when they witnessed a Geogan (Mutasect) that was recently summoned from the Healing Core Cell before it disappeared all of a sudden, prompting Dan to suggest that they search for one. Wynton leads them to the location of Reeds research lab where the previous Geogan disappeared from, then they decide to split up (as suggested by Dan) in order to make their search faster. While searching for Geogan, Lightning and Ferascal encounter Everett and Strata (and then later, Crystal Blue) who deduce that they're also after Geogan. Lia and Ajit arrive in time which leads to an ensuing battle. During the battle, the AB seem to have the upper hand, but Strata, having been sent by Crystal Blue to investigate strange voices that she heard earlier returns with three strange Bakucores (dubbed as Geocores) which they use to summon their Geogan, consisting of Viperagon, Sluggler, and Stardox. Using their new advantage, they successfully defeat the AB. Dan, Wynton, and Shun arrive, only to witness their friends defeated by the trio's Geogan. Dan and Wynton prepare to battle them, but Shun tells Dan to withdraw for now, much to his reluctance. However, realizing that they don't stand a chance against the trio now because of their Geogan, and the fact that his friends have all been defeated by them, he eventually gives in and the AB retreat for now.
216	6b	"The Geogan Arcleon!"; Transliteration: "Ākireon" (Japanese: アーキレオン)	February 28, 2021 (CAN); April 15, 2021 (US)	June 11, 2021
The AB are searching for a missing AAAnimus transport plane that was carrying confiscated Bakugan. They deduce that the reason AAAnimus were collecting these Bakugan is because they were caught battling illegally. Because the Drome no longer functions properly, they had no choice but to ban battling for their own protection. Still searching for the plane, Dan suggests that they split up in order to make their search faster. During the search, Dan is dissatisfied that Bakugan are being taken away from their partners, even though it's for their own protection. Drago claims that he's not like the other Bakugan that don't disappear when they lose and worries that he might disappear if he loses in battle, but Dan assures him that they won't lose. They manage to locate the transport plane and discover McQ who has hijacked it all of a sudden. After making a forced landing on him, the AB confront McQ who flees with the captured Bakugan where he plans to sell them in order to make a fortune. Dan and Shun chase after him while the AB go to check on the transport crew. They manage to intercept him, leading to an ensuing Bakugan battle. During the battle, Dan and Shun seem to have the upper hand, but McQ discovers a Geocore which he uses to summon his Geogan called Surturan. Using his new advantage, Surturan overpowers Drago, but before he can finish him off, Sharktar sacrifices himself to save Drago, worried that he'll disappear if he loses in battle. Surturan continues to pummel Drago, but before he can finish him off, Dan, who is determined to not lose this battle discovers a Geocore which he uses to summon his Geogan called Arcleon. Using his new advantage, Arcleon successfully defeat's Surturan before disappearing, having fulfilled Dan's wish. Left with no other choice because he is currently outmatched by all of the AB, McQ eventually surrenders and relinquishes the captured Bakugan to them. Much to Dan's shock, Drago reveals to him that he saw the battle from his heart that sensed it this whole time. Because Dan summoned his first Geogan, this has prompted the AB to learn more about them in the future. However, they soon discover that McQ has escaped all of a sudden, much to their complete shock.
217	7a	"Chase the Mysterious Bakugan!"; Transliteration: "Nazo no Bakugan o oe" (Japanese: 謎の爆丸を追え)	March 7, 2021 (CAN); April 15, 2021 (US)	June 25, 2021
The AB are preparing to shoot a Bakugan battle video from a dog's eye view, but all of a sudden, they discover some guy offering his fixing services to everyone in Los Volmos because he believes that Bakugan are causing damage everywhere. Shun recognizes him as Bubba Blakelee who owns a fixing company called the "Baku-bust Fixit Company," capable of fixing things that were broken by Bakugan during their battles. Pretty soon, the AB and everyone else will stop worrying about the Bakugan doing more damage to the town because the Kazami's are working on a new Drome, hoping that it will also contain the power of the Geogan as well. If the new Drome succeeds in working well, the AB will be able to go all out in every battle so far. Suddenly, Kravitz appears and asks for the AB's help at once. She explains that a masked Brawler has been causing damage to Los Volmos at night, and that the Security Force didn't have the resources to find him, which is why she asked for their help in the first place. The AB search for the masked Brawler, until Wynton contacts the others and tells them that he's at the school. They manage to intercept him before he can attempt to cause damage to the school, leading to an ensuing Bakugan battle. However, since he's currently outmatched and is unable to handle all of the AB at once, he flees. Lightning and Ferascal spot him and stow away on his truck where they overhear him revealing that he was responsible for the destruction all around town so that he could scam people to pay him to fix everything. He plans to do more damage before the new Drome is ready. Arriving back at his place, Lightning appears and pulls off his mask, revealed to be Bubba who was behind the destruction all along. This leads to an ensuing Bakugan battle where Ferascal easily gains the upper hand and successfully defeats Maxodon who disappears. As a result, Bubba's place ends up completely destroyed as the Security Force arrives and arrests him. In the aftermath, Lia is thrilled that Lightning was able to record everything that Bubba said, which is all the proof they need, and as a result, Kravitz decides to offer him a huge reward, revealed to be a pile of bones which he starts to enjoy, much to Ferascal's annoyance.
218	7b	"Drago in the Crosshairs"; Transliteration: "Nerawa Reta Dorago" (Japanese: 狙われたドラゴ)	March 7, 2021 (CAN); April 15, 2021 (US)	June 25, 2021
Dan and Shun prepare to test out the new Drome developed by the Kazami's latest tech, the Drome generator since the old Drome has become unstable for an unknown reason. If this Drome is a success, then Brawlers all over the world will be able to battle just like they used to. While testing out the new system, the Drome is revealed to be invulnerable to Bakugan attacks, which means that the system works perfectly (although it is still a prototype, which means it can only be used in certain locations). However, Wynton suggests that they perform one more test in order to find out if a Bakugan will still disappear after losing in battle. Since the AB's Bakugan are not able to disappear because they are different for starters, Drago asks Sharktar to attack him, much to his reluctance. Still, Dan is willing to take that risk and prepares to battle Shun in order to find out if Drago will disappear or not, in which he plans to grab hold of him the moment he's about to vanish. Sharktar easily defeats Drago in one hit, causing Dan to freak out, worried he'll disappear following his loss, but he doesn't all of a sudden, which means that the test was a huge success. Following that, the AB soon learn that everyone is starting to battle once again because of the new Drome, which has also increased the popularity of Bakugan all around the world, thanks to Dan and Drago. Suddenly, Lightning spots something in the video where the AB discover a new Golden Bakugan interfering in a battle in an attempt to draw out Drago. He continues to ruin many battles everywhere in an attempt to get his attention so that he can battle him, which has led the people to blame the AB for this occurrence, thinking that they were involved somehow. Dan decides to lure him to their location so that he and Drago can defeat him with their full strength, much to the AB's reluctance. He sets up the Drome in an attempt to lure him here, which doesn't work at first. Eventually, the Golden Bakugan, whose name is Spartillion, actually shows up ready to battle Drago. During the battle, Spartillion reveals that he was sent by the Supreme Bakugan Council to most likely retrieve Drago for some particular reason as ordered. At first, Dan and Drago seem to have the upper hand, but in a shocking turn of events, Spartillion destroys the Drome generators, forcing Drago to hold back his strength. As a result, he successfully defeats Drago as he prepares to disappear. Before doing so, Dan rushes towards him and grabs hold of him as the gateway drags both of them down below to an unknown location, most likely somewhere in Vestroia. Spartillion then leaves, having completed his mission.
219	8a	"Magnus of the Wild"; Transliteration: "Atarashiki Niriasu" (Japanese: 新しきニリアス)	March 14, 2021 (CAN); April 15, 2021 (US)	July 9, 2021
Following Dan and Drago's disappearance, the AB are attempting to figure out a way to get to Vestroia so that they can go and rescue them. Magnus suddenly shows up in search of Dan because he intends to fulfill his promise to him by challenging him to a Bakugan battle. He begins to explain that he has spent a long time trying to figure out how to defeat Dan and Drago because he had a hard time trying to understand why he couldn't defeat them to begin with, until he and Nillious developed new powers which they plan to use to settle the score. Because Dan is not here because he disappeared along with Drago, the AB decide to battle him in his place for now, which Magnus accepts. During the battle, Lia, Ajit, and Lightning seem to have the upper hand, but all of a sudden, Magnus summons a Geocore which he uses to summon his Geogan called Hyenix who easily defeats the trio. Wynton and Shun join in next and manage to defeat Nillious, but not before he destroys the Drome generators. That's when the AB realize that Magnus intended to lose on purpose in order to travel to Vestroia to find Dan as he and Nillious disappear through the gateway.
220	8b	"Gate Card, Set!"; Transliteration: "Gēto Kādo" (Japanese: ゲートカード)	March 14, 2021 (CAN); April 15, 2021 (US)	July 9, 2021
Wynton is designing a new mobile gate in order to travel to Vestroia to find Dan and Drago which requires an incredible amount of power in order to do so. Shun arrives and shows him a new Gate Card system developed by the Kazami's which includes a gauntlet capable of setting up portable Drome's wherever possible, and Gate Cards which draw in and amplify energy, making it possible to set up Dromes. If this system gets out to the public, then Brawlers all over the world will be able to battle wherever they want. He suggests that Wynton use one of the cards to generate enough power to open the mobile gate, which should work since they can stabilize a Drome for starters. While continuing his work on the mobile gate, Falcron begins to question Wynton's importance to Dan because he doesn't understand friendship, but he harshly dismisses him, much to his annoyance. The next day, Wynton sets up the Drome using one of the Gate Cards. However, before the AB can battle each other in order to power up the mobile gate, Jenny shows up and steals it. Determined to get it back, Wynton decides to battle her. As the battle commences, Falcron decides to handle it himself and refuses Wynton's help, much to his sadness. However, Jenny summons Mutasect who easily overpowers Falcron. Nearly at the brink of defeat, Wynton suddenly realizes how hard he was on Falcron last night, which explains why he rejected his help at the start of the battle. Determined to fix his partnership with him, Wynton states that he will battle alongside Falcron because he considers him his friend, and as a result, he summons a Geocore which he uses to summon his Geogan called Talan who successfully defeat's Mutasect. As a result of Jenny's defeat, she returns the mobile gate in a fit of anger and leaves. In the aftermath, not only have Wynton and Falcron made amends with each other, but their battle has successfully charged the mobile gate fully. He then uses it to open up a gateway to Vestroia as the AB enter it, still determined to find Dan and Drago, no matter the cost.
221	9a	"Supreme Council Calculations"; Transliteration: "Saikō Hyōgi-kai no Omowaku" (Japanese: 最高評議会の思惑)	March 21, 2021 (CAN); April 15, 2021 (US)	July 23, 2021
The AB arrive in Vestroia in search of Dan and Drago, until Spartillion appears and tries to stop them from finding Drago. This leads to a battle where he defeats most of the Brawlers, until Drago arrives and subdues him. He manages to clear up the misunderstanding by telling the AB that he has fully recovered his energy, and that Spartillion is the messenger of the Supreme Bakugan Council who was sent to retrieve him as ordered. He also tells them that Dan is perfectly safe; in reality, he's actually asleep somewhere. He then takes the AB to the Council Chamber to meet the Supreme Bakugan Council, the group that makes important decisions on Vestroia, and it is revealed that they summoned Drago here to begin with; the Council consists of Pyravian, Goreene, and Viloch. Viloch begins to explain that a human, referring to Gregorius Reed came to Vestroia and stole the Healing Core Cell which he took back to Earth and used its power to summon the Geogan. In ancient times, the Geogan flourished alongside the Bakugan, but things changed and the Geogan decided to remove themselves from Vestroia. Despite Pyravian claiming that not all humans are bad, Viloch states that ever since Vestroia fused with Earth, humans have been abusing the power of Bakugan through capture and control. He also reminds Goreene about the time he was captured by Shun's father and used as a power source. Viloch proposes that the only way to save all Bakugan and Geogan is to separate Vestroia from Earth, much to the AB's and Dan's shock. This leads to a debate among the Council members whether to go through with this decision or not. Goreene decides to agree with Viloch's proposal because he's concerned about protecting the future of all Bakugan despite the AB attempting to explain that they need their Bakugan because of the strong bonds they share together. Drago argues that their opinions are important and begins to explain that the bonds between humans and Bakugan have the potential to create a new world where they can coexist together. Therefore, he stands against Viloch's decision to separate Vestroia from Earth. Even though Viloch and Goreene still intend to separate the two planets as per their vote, Pyravian, touched by Drago's words reveals that the Council is incomplete because Tiko is no longer with them; therefore she decides to nominate Drago for a seat on the Supreme Bakugan Council, much to everyone else's shock.
222	9b	"Drago's Challenge"; Transliteration: "Dorago no Chōsen" (Japanese: ドラゴの挑戦)	March 21, 2021 (CAN); April 15, 2021 (US)	July 23, 2021
Picking up where we left off, Pyravian has nominated Drago for a seat on the Supreme Bakugan Council. Drago agrees to join the Council as long as Earth and Vestroia remain unseparated. However, Viloch states that he needs to pass a test first by taking part in a Bakugan battle in order to prove himself worthy enough to earn his place on the Supreme Bakugan Council. Dan decides to battle alongside Drago in which Viloch agrees because he's interested in seeing the bond they share together. Right before the test, Pyravian tells Dan and Drago that the reason she nominated Drago was because she was moved by his words in the Council Chamber, which is why she decided to bet on their bond which will help them win this battle. She also advises Dan to be a second set of eyes for Drago because he can see things that Drago cannot, much to Dan's confusion. The battle is about to begin where Drago must defeat the Auratoa, the guardians of Vestroia. In order to qualify for the Supreme Bakugan Council, he must battle and defeat all three of these Bakugan at once. During the battle, Drago manages to defeat the first Auratoa, but the other two gain the upper hand on him while the AB deduce that they were observing Drago in order to anticipate his moves as per their advantage, which Viloch confirms easily. Nearly at the brink of defeat, Dan summons Arcleon who manages to defeat the second Auratoa. However, before the third Auratoa can finish off Drago, Dan, remembering what Pyravian told him before the test locates a Bakucore, powers up Drago with it, and successfully defeat's the third and final Auratoa, thus completing the test and earning his position on the Supreme Bakugan Council as they celebrate their victory.
223	10a	"Drago Joins the Supreme Council"; Transliteration: "Kudasa Reru Ketsudan" (Japanese: 下される決断)	March 28, 2021 (CAN); April 15, 2021 (US)	August 6, 2021
Having passed the test, Drago is now a member of the Supreme Bakugan Council who becomes determined to prevent the separation of Vestroia and Earth. Meanwhile, Lightning and Ferascal accidentally upset Apollyon, a Golden Bakugan who, annoyed by their antics, starts to chase after them. In the Council Chamber, the Bakugan Council members cast their votes on whether to separate Earth and Vestroia or not, which results in a tie. Unable to decide on what to do because of the tie, Dan suggests a Bakugan battle to settle it. Goreene is reluctant to accept Dan's proposal because a battle between the four members of the Council would never end, meaning that nothing would get decided immediately. Viloch, referring to the Supreme Bakugan Council Constitution proposes a Battle Judgment, meaning that each Council member will choose a Bakugan champion to battle in their place. The winner's opinion will claim the deciding vote. Furthermore, each Council member shall establish one rule each for the upcoming tournament. Goreene's rule decrees that the battles will take place in all six faction realms, Pyravian's rule decrees that each Council member shall choose three Bakugan to fight for them, and Drago's rule decrees that the Bakugan will be allowed to fight alongside their human partners, mainly the AB because of the bonds they share together. Before Viloch can cast his rule, Apollyon chases Lightning and Ferascal into the Council Chamber, interrupting the meeting in the process. Enraged by their antics, he challenges them to a battle which Lightning accepts. During the battle, Apollyon easily overpowers Ferascal. Nearly defeated, Lightning comes to Ferascal's defense by claiming that despite their differences due to her childish personality, they are still partners willing to stand up to Bakugan like Apollyon. This results in Lightning summoning a Geocore which he uses to summon his Geogan called Montrapod who easily defeats Apollyon. In the aftermath, Viloch, impressed by Lightning's battle, especially with his Geogan, casts his rule by decreeing that summoning Geogan will be allowed in the tournament in order to give the AB a fair chance of winning, leading the other Council members to agree as well. It's now up to the AB to win their battles and save the bond between humans and Bakugan once and for all.
224	10b	"Find the Triplets!"; Transliteration: "Mitsugo o Sagase" (Japanese: 三つ子を探せ)	March 28, 2021 (CAN); April 15, 2021 (US)	August 6, 2021
The AB are preparing for the upcoming Battle Judgement tournament in order to prevent the separation of Earth and Vestroia. Their training is soon interrupted by a couple, revealed to be the Rowdy Red's parents who explain that they ran away from home. According to their letter, the reason they ran away is because they got upset about moving away from Los Volmos because of their dad's new job, and that they want to remain close to the Bakugan, as well as the AB themselves. The AB start searching for the Rowdy Reds, with no luck whatsoever. During the search, Shun and Ajit discover a group of sad kids who reveal that their Bakugan were stolen a while ago. Ajit discovers a set of footprints and deduces that the Rowdy Reds have resorted to stealing in order to survive on their own. They decide to follow the tracks, hoping that they will lead them to the triplets. Meanwhile, Strata, whom the Rowdy Reds have been working with earlier, attempts to persuade them to take up a life of thievery in order to survive, much to their reluctance. However, Shun and Ajit manage to find them and attempt to convince them to return to their parents, but they refuse, still upset about the move. This leads to an ensuing Bakugan battle where they seem to have the upper hand at first, but Pincitaur makes a comeback and successfully defeats them. Strata steals their Bakugan for their failure and attempts to flee, but Ajit summons a Geocore which he uses to summon his Geogan called Titan King who manages to prevent Strata from getting away by defeating him, thus reclaiming the Bakugan that he stole from the triplets. In the aftermath, the Rowdy Reds return the stolen Bakugan to the kids, promising that they will never steal anymore of them again. They also reunite with their parents who reveal that they have decided not to move away because they now understand how important Los Volmos is to them, mostly because of their Bakugan, and the AB themselves, much to their delight.
225	11a	"Butt Out of the Bakugan Show"; Transliteration: "Wakuwaku Bakugan Shō" (Japanese: わくわく爆丸ショー)	April 4, 2021 (CAN); April 15, 2021 (US)	August 20, 2021
The AB discover an event called the Bakugan Show that is happening on Sunday at the Los Volmos Mall where Bakugan and Brawlers compete in a variety of contests. They decide to enter it because the winner of each contest will receive a trophy. During the show, Ajit loses the strength contest, Lightning loses the speed contest, and Dan forgets to sign up for the funny contest. The only contest that remains is the beauty contest which Lia and Fenneca have signed up for. Suddenly, they discover a sad kid who recently won the strength contest who reveals that the sponsor who gave him the trophy also forced him to give him his Bakugan despite protesting against it. The AB eventually realize that the only way to see him in person is for Lia and Fenneca to win the beauty contest. During that contest, Lia and Fenneca manage to score big. Duran shows up attempting to take the lead in this contest as well, but ends up receiving a very low score. As a result, Lia and Fenneca win the beauty contest. She is then taken to meet the sponsor of this show, revealed to be Everett and deduces that he orchestrated this show in the first place in order to steal everyone's Bakugan. Everett explains that he's doing this in order to receive money from high ratings. Lia, determined to stop him, initiates a Bakugan battle, prompting Duran to challenge her on Everett's persuasion, believing that his popularity will rise if he does so. During the battle, Duran seems to have the upper hand, but Lia summons a Geocore which she uses to summon her Geogan called Arachnia who successfully defeats Duran. In the aftermath, Lia exposes Everetts plan, causing everyone to turn on him. Fenneca on the other hand becomes happy for winning the trophy because she considers it a hard-earned treasure for her beauty, much to Lia's satisfaction.
226	11b	"Crystal Blue the Songstress"; Transliteration: "Utahime Kurisutaru Burū" (Japanese: 歌姫クリスタル・ブルー)	April 4, 2021 (CAN); April 15, 2021 (US)	August 20, 2021
The AB discover that Chad and Chester are hosting a concert at the Los Volmos Bowl on Sunday where they plan to finish off their show with a Bakugan battle between Chad and Dan as their special guest, prompting Dan to accept their request. At the concert, the AB and Dan become shocked when they discover that Crystal Blue is their lead singer, which explains how Needles became popular in the first place. As she starts singing, her soothing voice begins to put the entire audience in a hypnotic state all of a sudden, including the AB and Dan. Luckily, Ferascal, unaffected by the song manages to wake up Lightning who was asleep during the song. He then wakes up Dan who discovers that Crystal Blue is controlling everyone with her singing (as explained by Ferascal). He suddenly catches Strata stealing everyone's Bakugan, and it is revealed that this was their plan all along; their plan was to use this concert (hosted by Needles) to steal the audience's Bakugan while Crystal Blue used her singing voice to keep them in a hypnotic state in order to prevent everyone from discovering their plan as ordered by Reed. Determined to stop them, Dan and Lighting initiate a Bakugan battle against Crystal Blue and Chad. During the battle, Lightning manages to free the audience, including the other AB from Crystal Blue's trance, resulting in Strata getting caught by everyone as they start attacking him for stealing their Bakugan. Reed contacts Crystal Blue who leaves all of a sudden, leaving Chad behind to continue the battle on his own. Despite his best efforts, Lightning summons Montrapod who easily defeats him. In the aftermath, Needle's concert is a disaster as the audience start throwing away their merchandise, having been scammed by Crystal Blue and Strata. Nevertheless, Chad and Chester start to get over it pretty quickly because they got to live their dream, even though it lasted for a short amount of time. They hope that someday, they can host more concerts on their own in the future due to their rock and roll spirits.
227	12a	"Magnus's Journey"; Transliteration: "Magunasu no Tabi" (Japanese: マグナスの旅)	April 11, 2021 (CAN); April 15, 2021 (US)	September 3, 2021
Magnus travels through Vestroia in search of Dan and Drago, until he and Nillious discover a Cubbo tribe being attacked by a Bakugan named Serpillious. Luckily, he manages to save them, causing him to flee. Magnus attempts to ask the Cubbo's where Dan is, but, believing that they can't understand him, he prepares to leave, only to be stopped by Crystal Blue who explains that the tribe needs his help since she can understand them to begin with, saying that Serpillious has been attacking them numerous times for his own fun. If he helps them, they'll give him what he seeks. The Cubbos take Magnus to their treasure, revealed to be a radiant stone, which was the power that Crystal Blue sensed this whole time, revealing that the light from the stone opens a door for the conquering hero, a legend passed down in this tribe. Crystal Blue claims that if he rids them of Serpillious, the Bakugan that attacked the Cubbos in the first place, the title will be his, as well as the stone. Magnus, still determined to find Dan in Vestroia, refuses their gift and leaves. One of the Cubbos catches up to him, causing Magnus to point out in frustration that all that the Cubbos do is run away without battling, claiming that he will not let fear stand in his way, that is if the Cubbo could understand him. Crystal Blue confirms that he does understand him, but only from his heart. Suddenly, Serpillious returns, preparing to attack the Cubbo tribe once again. Magnus battles him, but despite his best efforts, Serpillious overpowers Nillious. Cubbo, seeing Nillious in danger comes to his defense and, remembering Magnus's words saying that he won't let fear stand in his way, manages to land a small attack on Serpillious. Before he can finish him off, the Cubbo tribe, inspired by Cubbo's bravery which they all witnessed, rally together against Serpillious by repelling his attack, causing him to flee once again. In the aftermath, Magnus is about to leave to continue his search for Dan, but Cubbo, claiming him as the real hero decides to give him the radiant stone instead, having discovered his plan where he had Nillious pretend to be defeated in order to inspire the Cubbo tribe to take action by conquering their fear in order to stand up to Serpillious. Because of their newfound bravery, they have the courage to protect themselves from now on. Although Magnus refuses the stone once again, he eventually relents and decides to accept it after being persuaded by the tribe. It suddenly opens up a gateway back to Earth where Crystal Blue reveals that Dan has returned to Los Volmos before entering it herself, much to Magnus's shock. He and Nillious then enter the gateway back to Earth, still determined to find and challenge Dan once and for all.
228	12b	"Beach Battle"; Transliteration: "Bīchi de no Bakugan Batoru" (Japanese: ビーチでの爆丸バトル)	April 11, 2021 (CAN); April 15, 2021 (US)	September 3, 2021
Shun has called a strategy meeting for the AB because it's only a matter of time before the Battle Judgement tournament begins where they will have to battle the Council members Viloch and Goreene. Since the battles will be taking place in all six faction realms, the AB believe that they'll have the advantage in their battles so far. However, Sharktar discovers that Shun has a lack of swimming, prompting the AB to help him out with some special training. They take him to the beach to get him prepared, but only end up doing beach activities instead, resulting in an argument between Dan and Lia about how to get Shun properly prepared for the upcoming tournament. Sharktar offers to teach Shun how to swim instead, to no avail due to his aquaphobia. Suddenly, a group of surfer fans approach Shun, whom they recognize as one of the AB and offer to have him join them on the water for a picture shot, but due to his aquaphobia, they start to make fun of him. The female surfer attempts to persuade Sharktar to partner up with her, but despite interference from Dan, Sharktar reluctantly agrees if she and her friends can defeat him and Shun in a Bakugan battle, which they accept. During the battle, the surfers use their surfing skills to their advantage and easily gain the upper hand on Sharktar. Shun, determined to help Sharktar manages to conquer his fear and jumps into the water using a high tech diving suit developed by the Kazami's, but despite some difficulties swimming for the first time, Sharktar manages to save him, only to be overpowered by the surfers. Nearly defeated, Shun discovers a Geocore which he uses to summon his Geogan called Stingzer who successfully defeat's the surfers. In the aftermath, Shun has won the respect of the surfers, having conquered his aquaphobia from the start. He knows that as long as he's with Sharktar, he will no longer be afraid of the ocean.
229	13a	"The Mysterious Masked Bandits!"; Transliteration: "Maddo Masuku-dan" (Japanese: マッドマスク団)	April 18, 2021 (CAN); April 15, 2021 (US)	September 17, 2021
A group of masked bandits called the Mad Masks break into a museum and steal a couple of ancient Bakugan. The AB soon learn about the theft from last night where Wynton suggests tracking down the energy source first using his Baku-Radar app that he created which has the ability to detect different kinds of Bakugan energy, hoping that it will lead them to the Mad Masks who are also after it to begin with. The AB start searching the city for the energy source, with no luck whatsoever. Wynton's search on the other hand leads him underground, deducing that the energy spike is nearby. Ajit joins up with him as well, having followed the Mad Masks who went underground after spotting them. Deducing that they're after another ancient Bakugan, Wynton and Ajit follow them to an underground location where they discover the Mad Masks about to break down a wall. Wynton becomes surprised when he learns from his app that the mysterious energy from last night came from them. Determined to stop the Mad Masks from stealing the ancient Bakugan on the other side of the wall, Wynton and Ajit confront the Mad Masks and initiate a Bakugan battle against their leader. During the battle, he overpowers them at first, but Wynton turns the tides by summoning Talan who successfully defeats the leader, who turns out to be Strata. Unbeknownst to them, Reed contacts Strata and orders him and the Mad Masks to retreat for now. Meanwhile, Dan's search for the energy spike leads him to AAAnimus HQ where he discovers Reed addressing the media during his visit at the facility. Dan angrily confronts him for what he did to the Healing Core Cell recently, but Reed becomes delighted to meet him for the first time, hoping that they'll be seeing each other again soon enough.
230	13b	"The Mysterious Brawler"; Transliteration: "Maddo Masuku no Bosu" (Japanese: マッドマスクのボス)	April 18, 2021 (CAN); April 15, 2021 (US)	September 17, 2021
Wynton and Ajit learn about Dan's confrontation with Gregorius Reed, which took place around the same time when they were battling the Mad Masks led by Strata. They soon get a message from Kravitz asking for their presence immediately. Arriving at AAAnimus HQ, Kravitz explains that the Mad Masks are planning to steal an ancient Bakugan that has been placed in AAAnimus custody, which is why she asked for the AB help in the first place because she deduces that they'll return to make another attempt yet again. Unbeknownst to them, Strata and the Mad Masks skydive into the facility, alerting the AB in the process. In order to cover all the bases, Shun suggests splitting up where he advises Dan and Drago to go to where the ancient Bakugan is being kept while the rest of the AB guard the facility from the outside. While the AB battle the Mad Masks, Dan and Drago head towards the ancient Bakugan being kept in AAAnimus custody, but arrive too late as it is already stolen. They manage to catch up to the Mysterious Brawler, who turns out to be Reed. Determined to stop him from getting away with the ancient Bakugan, Dan initiates a battle against him. However, they become shocked when they discover that his Bakugan is Spartillion. During the battle, Spartillion overpowers Drago, but Dan summons Arcleon who manages to turn the tides on Spartillion, in which Reed inadvertently drops the ancient Bakugan. Kravitz manages to retrieve it, and it is revealed that the Mad Masks fled after the AB defeated them. In a shocking turn of events, Reed escapes the facility, hoping that he and Dan will meet again soon. As he flies away, Strata is still upset about failing the mission, but Reed is still satisfied with the outcome because he most likely got to meet and battle Dan for the very first time.
231	14a	"Princess of the Garbage Heap, Bethany!"; Transliteration: "Gomi Yama no Purinsesu" (Japanese: ゴミ山のプリンセス)	April 25, 2021 (CAN); September 15, 2021 (US)	October 1, 2021
The AB head to a junkyard to throw away a bunch of junk that the Bakugan have collected recently, which made Lia furious to begin with. Upon arrival, while exploring the junkyard, they soon meet a young girl named Princess Bethany who claims that the junkyard is her kingdom. Eventually, she decides to put aside their actions for now due to their "assumed" loyalty. Meanwhile, Lightning and Ferascal continue to explore the junkyard, until Lightning accidentally collapses a huge junkpile while attempting to retrieve a bone flag. Enraged that her tower is now destroyed, and after discovering Lightning with her flag, assuming that he's attempting to steal it, Bethany initiates a Bakugan battle against him. During the battle, Bethany seems to have the upper hand due to her advantage in the junkyard, but luckily, Lightning summons Montrapod who successfully defeats her. Having accepted her loss, Bethany leaves for home and decides to relinquish her kingdom to Lightning and Ferascal. However, they catch up to Bethany and proclaim that they want to share the kingdom and its treasures with her. Delighted by that idea, Bethany decides to continue to rule over the junkyard once again.
232	14b	"Find the Mysterious Cryptid, Wolfman!"; Transliteration: "Nazo no Yūma Ramaman" (Japanese: 謎のUMA・ラママン)	April 25, 2021 (CAN); September 15, 2021 (US)	October 1, 2021
Lia discovers that the views on the AB's video channel have been decreasing a lot lately since they've been busy training for the upcoming Battle Judgement tournament. While begging for new video ideas, Wynton suggests that they investigate the existence of the Wolfman, a mysterious cryptid living out in the forests all around Los Volmos, much to Lia's shock. He is determined to catch the Wolfman on camera in order to prove his existence to the public despite Lia refusing to believe he is real. After setting up camp, around nighttime, Lia begins to hear strange noises, assuming it was Lightning at first, but she suddenly spots what she believes is the Wolfman, causing her to faint all of a sudden. Her commotion wakes up the AB as Wynton uses one of his light spheres to draw out the Wolfman. Determined to capture the Wolfman, Wynton decides to battle him. During the battle, the Wolfman overpowers Falcron with his super strength and speed due to his size, but luckily, Wynton summons Talan who successfully defeats him. As a result, the AB deduce the Wolfman's identity, who turns out to be a hairy old man and his Bakugan. After apologizing to him, the Wolfman begins to explain that the reason he was driving away the humans from the forest is because he was trying to protect an endangered wolf pack, including the grey wolf: In the beginning, people have been coming here to set up camp, and he didn't like it when they caused damage to the forest, which is why he came up with the urban legend about the Wolfman in the first place in order to drive them away from the forest in order to protect the wolves. Worried that the legend will most likely attract more people in the process, Wynton comes up with an idea that will keep them away from the forest for good. Back at Studio D, according to Wynton's video that he created, it is revealed that he scared many viewers into never returning to that forest again by explaining their encounter with the Wolfman that attacked them (he didn't really attack the AB, this was part of Wynton's plan all along). Even though Lia never saw him because she fainted, she vows to never go back to that forest again. Elsewhere, the Wolfman and his wolf pack look beyond Los Volmos from a distance, now completely satisfied that the forest is safe once again.
233	15a	"The Mascot Cat!"; Transliteration: "Uwasa no Kanban Neko" (Japanese: 噂の看板猫)	May 2, 2021 (CAN); September 15, 2021 (US)	October 15, 2021
Lightning and Ferascal are on their way to Lightning's favorite steakhouse to enjoy a free feast, but they soon learn from its owner that a new sushi restaurant has opened across the street which has started to attract a lot of customers in the process, which has put a strain on its business for starters. Heading to the restaurant, Lightning and Ferascal discover that Ebony has become its mascot responsible for attracting all the customers to this place, much to their shock. Ebony begins to explain that after she returned to her life as a stray, the owner of the sushi restaurant took her in. Since then, she has started working here by becoming its mascot and putting on a variety of entertainment shows every day in her attempt to attract a lot of customers in exchange for sushi. Lightning attempts to persuade Ebony not to attract a lot of customers because he needs some of them in order to enjoy his steak meals, to no avail. This leads to an entertainment competition between him and Ebony in their attempts to attract customers to their restaurants. Frustrated over losing a bunch of customers to Lightning's dance shows, Ebony and her cat companions scheme to foil his plans, only to be startled by Ferascal's presence after she overheard her plan. She attempts to convince Ferascal to stop Lightning's dance shows by pranking him, but she refuses because she has her own prank standards, and that she's not interested in her idea. This leads to an ensuing Bakugan battle where Ebony seems to have the upper hand, but luckily, Lightning summons Montrapod and successfully defeats her. Afterwards, Lightning tells Ebony that they should continue to protect their favorite foods at their favorite restaurants because there are people that will like both sushi and steak equally. Back at Studio D, Lightning discovers that Ferascal stopped by the steakhouse and picked up a steak for him just the way he likes it, only to be pranked by her once again.
234	15b	"The AB's Grand Adventure!"; Transliteration: "Ōsamu Wan no Dai Bōken" (Japanese: オーサム・ワンの大冒険)	May 2, 2021 (CAN); September 15, 2021 (US)	October 15, 2021
The AB discover that the Bakugan Coliseum is hosting a Medieval adventure game where contestants compete in challenges to win. They receive their costumes based on their personalities and abilities although Dan is disappointed that he was chosen as a court jester. Moving forward, the AB manage to win their challenges based on their specialties while Dan fails most of them. However, arriving at the last challenge where the AB must place their Baku-balls in the correct order to open the castle gates, Dan has Drago destroy the gate instead, creating a big hole in the process. Much to their shock, they encounter Everett. Furthermore, Ajit discovers dozens of Bakugan in his possession, and it is revealed that he orchestrated this adventure game in order to steal the contestants' Bakugan by tricking them into putting them through the gate. He then initiates a battle using his new Bakugan Demorc. During the battle, Dan discovers that Demorc has the ability to predict Drago's fighting pattern, which has given him the advantage needed to win. Realizing that he needs to get into character based on the outfit he was chosen to wear based on his own personality and abilities, Dan decides to change up his battle style where he and Drago use unpredictable clown moves to their advantage, confusing Demorc in the process, much to Everett's annoyance, thus making a successful comeback. The Security Force suddenly arrives, causing Everett to flee all of a sudden. In the aftermath, Dan starts to believe that he and Drago should use this kind of battle style from now on, much to the latter's protest.
235	16a	"The Taste of Memories"; Transliteration: "Omoide no Aji" (Japanese: 思い出の味)	May 9, 2021 (CAN); September 15, 2021 (US)	October 29, 2021
After doing some training for the Battle Judgement tournament, during a lunch break, the AB learn from Ajit that he used to eat a lot of lentil curry growing up. However, he becomes depressed because there aren't any restaurants around that serve that kind of dish. On Pincituar's request, the AB decide to make him a surprise dinner by making their own lentil curry just for him. Meanwhile, Shun attempts to keep their secret from Ajit for now while the other AB attempt to make the lentil curry, to no avail. He also learns from them that the store they're at is sold out of lentils (and other beans too). Taking matters into his own hands, Shun manages to locate a store that is selling the last bag of lentils. Before he can buy them, Crystal Blue appears, also after the bag of lentils because she hasn't eaten them for a long time since she was in Vestroia recently. They decide to have a battle to determine who gets the last bag of lentils. During the battle, Crystal Blue's new Bakugan Apophix overpowers Sharktar. Shun summons Stingzer who makes a successful comeback by overpowering Apophix, nearly defeating him in the process. Shun proclaims that the reason he needs the bag of lentils is because he is making lentil curry for Ajit. Moved by his words, Crystal Blue decides to allow Shun to keep the bag of lentils in exchange for one request. Later, Shun brings Ajit to Wynton's house as he and the other AB surprise him with a lentil curry dinner. However, Ajit reveals to them that he doesn't like lentil curry at all because it was Storm's favorite food, not his. This makes Pincituar realize that the reason Ajit was upset the other day was because of the memory of how much he didn't like lentil curry at all. Still, Ajit decides to try it anyway and has come to like it because it's not spicy; in other words, Storm prefers spicy food, which is not his favorite. Suddenly, the AB discover Crystal Blue in their presence, but Shun reveals to them that he agreed to let her try the lentil curry in exchange for the bag of lentils. Nevertheless, the AB decide to enjoy their well-prepared dinner that they made for Ajit.
236	16b	"Virtual Brawl"; Transliteration: "Bācharu Batoru" (Japanese: バーチャルバトル)	May 9, 2021 (CAN); September 15, 2021 (US)	October 29, 2021
Lia and Fenneca test out Benton's new VR simulator which will help her and the other AB prepare for the upcoming Battle Judgement tournament, run by an AI program called Vision, capable of bringing the consciousness of humans and Bakugan into a virtual world. While battling a simulated version of Talan, Vision starts to go rogue and corrupts Talan as he starts to pummel Fenneca. Benton theorizes that Talan's power was too much for Vision's processors to handle, which means that his strength has overwritten its parameters, which explains why Vision went rogue in the first place; it wasn't able to process the data from him. Wynton and Benton attempt to free Lia and Fenneca from the simulation by stopping it, but Vision locks them out. Falcron attempts to yank them out of there, but Benton warns him that doing so would bring permanent damage to Lia and Fenneca. Wynton contacts Lia and tells her that the only way to stop Vision is to cut the power to the entire facility, therefore shutting down the machine that's creating the simulation. All she has to do is hang in there for a little while longer. After losing contact with her (in which Vision severs their connection), Benton locates the control room where the power supply is, but since Vision has locked the door to this room, they send Falcron through the air ducts to shut down the power generator manually. Wynton and Benton are determined to shut down the power before Vision becomes aware of their plan. Falcron arrives at the generator room and manages to break the generator's casing. He then throws a small piece of the casing at the generator, shutting down the power and Vision in the process, and freeing Lia and Fenneca from the simulation as well. Dan on the other hand finds out about the VR simulation and decides to give it a go, only to be stopped by Lia and Wynton who have vowed to never use VR technology again.
237	17a	"Volcanic Island S.O.S!"; Transliteration: "Kazanjima Esuōesu" (Japanese: 火山島SOS)	May 16, 2021 (CAN); September 15, 2021 (US)	November 12, 2021
The AB learn from Wynton that he can't join them for their training for the Battle Judgement because he has to watch his younger siblings, much to their complete dissatisfaction. While trying to figure out a way to continue their training, Dan suggests that they ask Benton for help. He takes them to a volcanic island that he owns as the perfect spot for their training. According to this island, Benton has been planning to build a research outpost there to begin with. He assures them that the volcanic activity will remain calm for this week and gives them heat resistant suits that will protect them from the rising heat. Arriving on the island, the AB begin their training while Ajit and Pincitaur explore the island. Suddenly, the volcano begins to erupt during their training. Benton calls the AB back and deduces that the volcano monitoring instruments that have been placed all around the island didn't go off because the temperature rose at a fast rate. He advises the AB to get off the island immediately, but they soon learn that Ajit is not with them since he's on the other side of the island. Benton suggests that they get to him with the airship, but Dan refuses due to the dangerous risk and decides to search for him with Drago. They manage to locate Ajit just as the volcano starts to erupt. Sharktar arrives to help and, using their combined teamwork, successfully stop the lava flow, saving Ajit and getting him off the island in the process. In the aftermath, despite the dangerous incident, the AB are still satisfied with the result because they got some good training in today.
238	17b	"Panic in Pin Point Park"; Transliteration: "Panikku in Pin Pointo Pāku" (Japanese: パニック・イン・ピンポイントパーク)	May 16, 2021 (CAN); September 15, 2021 (US)	November 12, 2021
Wynton is forced to stay behind to watch his younger siblings Anton and Jennifer as they start running around the house causing chaos everywhere. Upon seeing an advertisement where a bunch of Bakugan battles will be taking place at Pin Point Park, they beg him to take them there. Wynton refuses at first because they're supposed to stay at home, but after having second thoughts (in which he plans on showing his siblings his battle skills in the field), he changes his mind and decides to take them to Pin Point Park. Arriving at Pin Point Park, Anton and Jennifer start to run off, with Wynton chasing after them. This results in the siblings interrupting Chad and Chester's battle (they were about to start until the siblings got in the way), and Marco and Duran's battle. Enraged, Marco and Duran challenge Wynton to a battle which he accepts because this will give him the chance to impress Anton and Jennifer. During the battle, Marco and Duran overpower Falcron with their combined teamwork. Anton and Jennifer encourage Wynton and Falcron to not give up on this battle, which results in Wynton summoning a Geocore which he uses to summon Talan who overpowers and successfully defeats Marco and Duran. In the aftermath, Anton and Jennifer apologize to Wynton for running off and promise to not cause any more trouble for him, but despite that, they run off anyway to watch another Bakugan battle, with Wynton chasing after them once again.
239	18a	"Underground Panic"; Transliteration: "Andāguraundo Panikku" (Japanese: アンダーグラウンド・パニック)	May 23, 2021 (CAN); September 15, 2021 (US)	November 26, 2021
The AB head down to an underground mine owned by the Kazami's to continue their training. Arriving at a perfect battle location, Dan and Lightning begin their practice match. Meanwhile, Fenneca and Pincitaur run off to explore the mine for treasure. After Ajit and Lia catch up to them, a horrifying presence scares them away. They soon discover the other AB surrounded by an army of Bakugan that came from a gateway. They battle the Bakugan with all their might, but despite their best efforts, they become outmatched in the process. Luckily, in a surprising turn of events, Magnus shows up to assist them. Motivated, the AB and Magnus successfully drive the Bakugan back through the gateway. Afterwards, Wynton closes the gateway in order to prevent them from coming back. Next, Magnus begins to explain to the AB that he used a travel stone to return to Earth. After he was given the stone, he realized that Dan was back in Los Volmos, but instead of returning right away, he decided to stay in Vestroia to search for opponents to battle in order to become even stronger than before. When he returned to Earth, the gateway was still open when the Bakugan came through it, even though he managed to drive them back and sealed the gateway afterwards, which led him to suspect that Dan had something to do with it. Dan attempts to challenge Magnus to a battle, but he declines for now, saying that he has found a perfect stage to settle their score when the time is right. He then leaves through the gateway, presumably back to Vestroia, leaving the AB completely puzzled at the moment. In Vestroia, Magnus locates the stage, hoping that he and Dan will battle soon when the time comes.
240	18b	"We Are the EXIT!"; Transliteration: "U Īā, Egujitto!" (Japanese: ウィーアー、エグジット！)	May 23, 2021 (CAN); September 15, 2021 (US)	November 26, 2021
The AB continue their training for the Battle Judgement, until "The Exit" team show up asking for their help because they want to make a new video for their channel. They want to turn over a new leaf in order to make up for all the bad stuff they used to do in the past, so they started uploading new videos that they've made recently, but their view count seems to be low. Eventually, the AB agree to help "The Exit" team. They start off by doing volunteer work as suggested by the AB in order to prove to the people that they've changed, such as picking up trash and assisting the elderly at a senior center by cooking for them. But despite all that hard work, their view counts still haven't increased yet. "The Exit" team, dissatisfied that their hard work wasn't enough to increase their views for their channel, run off in frustration. They soon come across McQ and Strata planning to sell a bunch of illegal controlling devices on the black market. "The Exit" team confront the duo in their attempt to stop them, which leads to an ensuing Bakugan battle where they manage to retrieve some controlling devices in order to use their Bakugan. When the AB arrive, they discover "The Exit" team nearly defeated. Aay, determined to prove himself, as well as the other members, manage to make a successful comeback by using what they've learned from their volunteer work to their advantage, defeating the duo in the process, causing McQ and Strata to flee. Aay thanks the AB for their help and reveals that he has come up with an idea for "The Exit" team's videos. According to their video, it is revealed that "The Exit" team has spread their new idea to their audience which involves doing volunteer work that will help them with their battle skills. Because of that, their view counts have increased, which means they have fully redeemed themselves.
241	19a	"The Battle Judgement Begins!"; Transliteration: "Batoru Jajjimento Kaimaku" (Japanese: バトルジャッジメント開幕)	May 30, 2021 (CAN); September 15, 2021 (US)	December 10, 2021
The AB are about to compete in the Battle Judgement. While heading to the arena, Lia notices someone in the shadows and chases after it, only to run into a Bakugan. This leads to a battle where it is revealed that it was Everett hiding in the shadows. Luckily, the other AB arrive to help her, but after Apollyon interrupts them, Everett flees while Dan pursues him, but he disappears all of a sudden. As the ceremony is about to begin, since the vote is still tied because Pyravian and Drago are against the separation of Earth and Vestroia, but Viloch and Goreene are not, Viloch states how the tournament will go: Each council member will choose a Bakugan to participate in this tournament. As long as one of the AB wins, things will remain as is. Suddenly, Everett shows up again, and Shun deduces that he attacked Lia and Fenneca in order to gain the advantage in the Battle Judgement. However, the rest of the Brawlers, consisting of McQ, Crystal Blue, Strata, Jenny Hackett, and Gregorius Reed also show up unexpectedly, and it is revealed that he and Viloch have teamed up with each other to ensure the separation of Earth and Vestroia so that another incident like this can never happen again. Much to Dan's shock, Magnus also arrives, revealed to be a participant in the Battle Judgment where he is determined to defeat him no matter what. With everything in place now, Viloch commences the beginning of the Battle Judgement.
242	19b	"Viloch Takes the Lead!"; Transliteration: "Arutimetto Vairokku" (Japanese: アルティメット・ヴァイロック)	May 30, 2021 (CAN); September 15, 2021 (US)	December 10, 2021
The Battle Judgement Ceremony is about to begin where the opponents will be selected by the jewels. After the participants transfer their energies into the jewels, thus creating the match-ups, the first match begins with Ajit competing against Reed. During the battle, Ajit seems to have the upper hand, especially after summoning Titan King, but Viloch summons six Geocores which he uses to summon six Geogan that suddenly merge with him, forming Ultimate Viloch in the process. Using his new advantage, he successfully defeats both Titan King and Pincitaur, thus winning the first match. In the aftermath, while the AB attempt to figure out a way to defeat Viloch who has the ability to fuse with six Geogan at once, Pyravian tells them that the only way to defeat him is with the power of the faction artifacts, sources of power that protect the six faction realms of Vestroia. If they retrieve those artifacts from all six realms, they will give them extraordinary power capable of defeating Viloch and his six Geogan combined with him. Pyravian takes the AB to the first artifact located beneath the Battle Arena, revealed to be a sword. It is said that only the one who has been chosen by the artifacts can pull the sword out of the stone. Drago attempts to do so, thinking that he might be worthy because he has saved Vestroia from many dangers recently, to no avail. Luckily, Dan decides to help him and he succeeds. Afterwards, the sword's energy suddenly merges with Drago. Now that the Aureopolis artifact is in his possession, Pyravian advises Dan and Drago to collect the remaining five artifacts, which they agree to do.
243	20a	"The Battle of Aquilia"; Transliteration: "Mizu no Miyako Akuira" (Japanese: 水の都アクイラ)	June 6, 2021 (CAN); September 15, 2021 (US)	December 24, 2021
Pyravian takes the AB to Aquilia (the Aquos realm) because she wants to show them a very special place before the continuation of the Battle Judgement. Upon arrival, the AB discover a lot of Bakugan in a deep hibernation, including their own, and their former main partners. Pyravian explains that this place is a temple called "The Shrine of Restoration" where all the wounded Bakugan are healed. This also reminds Drago about the time he used to sleep here in order to recover his strength after the battle against Haavik, until the others transferred their remaining energy to him in order to send him back to Earth to be with Dan and the AB, which means they still have a long way to go before they can fully recover. Furthermore, the Bakugan that disappeared from Earth are also hibernating as well, which made Pyravian suspicious. She started investigating this mystery and found out that Viloch has been acting strangely recently. Therefore, she deduces that he was responsible for the phenomenon happening on Earth, which includes the broken and unstable Drome, the mobile gate not working in the AB's favor, and the disappearance of the Bakugan after losing in battle, in other words, he's trying to separate Earth and Vestroia, regardless of who wins the tournament. The AB become determined to stop Viloch from separating the two planets no matter what, but only if they continue to gather the remaining artifacts located in the other faction realms. Since the Aquilia artifact is located somewhere in the ocean, making it impossible to find it, Sharktar reveals that he has been sensing a strong power upon arrival, though he was unable to sense its presence before. In a surprising turn of events, Pyravian discovers that the Aureopolis artifact is resonating with the Aquilia artifact, which means that it can lead them to that artifact for starters. Dan and Drago decide to go and retrieve it. The next match between Shun and McQ is about to begin where Shun and Sharktar plan to stall for time while Dan and Drago go to retrieve the Aquilia artifact. During the battle, Sharktar dodges all of Toronoid's moves in their attempt to stall for time. Viloch summons the six Geocores near McQ where he attempts to use all of them at once, but suddenly, Toronoid, corrupted by the power of the six Geocores because it was too much for him to handle starts to go berserk as he starts causing damage everywhere, but luckily, Sharktar defeats him, thus winning the match. Despite their victory, Shun becomes worried that he and Sharktar weren't able to delay the battle long enough for Dan and Drago to retrieve the artifact, worried that they'll lose by default if they show up late.
244	20b	"The Aquilia Artifact"; Transliteration: "Gekiryū o Koete" (Japanese: 激流を超えて)	June 6, 2021 (CAN); September 15, 2021 (US)	December 24, 2021
Dan and Drago search for the Aquilia artifact and manage to locate it via a surge of light. After locating the artifact, they attempt to retrieve it, but they discover that a strong current is protecting it. They attempt to get through the current again, but during the struggle, Dan's oxygen tank gets damaged in the process. Worried that he won't survive much longer underwater following that incident, Drago advises Dan to wait for him and keep watch while he goes to retrieve the artifact on his own despite Dan's protest. Seeing Drago struggle more, Dan, remembering what Drago told him before, suddenly realizes that watching is exactly what he needs to do and comes up with an idea. Realizing that the current is moving in a specific pattern which has multiple currents converging here, with Dan's help, Drago maneuver's through the current pattern and successfully retrieves the Aquilia artifact where its energy suddenly merges with him just like the previous artifact from Aureopolis. Dan's oxygen tank runs out, but is saved by Sharktar and Shun who gives Dan a new oxygen tank. Back at the arena, before Viloch can declare Crystal Blue the winner, Dan and Drago manage to make it back in time for their match against her. As the battle commences, Apophix starts to attack the surroundings on purpose in order to create hiding places to attack Drago from the shadows. Dan, remembering what he and Drago did when they were trying to retrieve the Aquilia artifact, comes up with a strategy plan where he has Drago feel the flow of the water in order to predict Apophix's movements. Using his plan, they gain the upper hand on Crystal Blue. Viloch summons the six Geocores again near Crystal Blue, but she decides to use one of them instead and summons Swarmer because she's worried that the same thing might happen again to Apophix like it did to Toronoid if she uses all of the Geocores at once. Dan summons Arcleon who successfully defeats Swarmer, thus winning the match. The Battle Judgment continues.
245	21a	"Wynton vs. Magnus"; Transliteration: "Uinton no Hisaku" (Japanese: ウィントンの秘策)	June 13, 2021 (CAN); September 15, 2021 (US)	January 7, 2022
In Ventana (the Ventus realm), Dan and Drago go to retrieve the artifact while Wynton faces Magnus in their match. During the battle, Nillious overpowers Falcron, nearly defeating him in the process. Seeing how strong Magnus and Nillious have gotten, Wynton advises Falcron to take a different approach in this battle, believing that it might work. He summons Talan who overpowers Nillious. Magnus summons Hyenix who successfully defeat's Talan. However, Magnus discovers that Falcron has disappeared, but it turns out this was all a deception as Falcron manages to get up close to Nillious. According to Wynton's strategy, it is revealed that he advised Falcron to strike the moment Magnus swaps out with his Geogan because sometimes Brawlers let their guard down a bit at that moment. Falcron lands an attack on Nillious, but he survives it and successfully defeats him, thus winning the match. In the aftermath, Magnus has come to realize that Wynton has become stronger than he thought since he considered him weak from the beginning. Meanwhile, Dan and Drago come across some writing on a monument that says "If friends you be follow the light, and our power shall be yours." Dan starts to think that the writing is a hint about the artifacts location, but can't figure out what it means. Suddenly, a surge of light from the monument appears where Drago thinks that it will lead them to the artifact. They then follow the light, hoping that it will lead them to the Ventana artifact.
246	21b	"Ventana Adventure"; Transliteration: "Bentāna no Shiren" (Japanese: ベンターナの試練)	June 13, 2021 (CAN); September 15, 2021 (US)	January 7, 2022
Dan and Drago follow the light from the monument, hoping that it will lead them to the Ventana artifact, but instead, it leads them to another monument with the same message as the first one. It then transmits another surge of light in a different direction where Drago believes that this is all they have to do. Suddenly, a giant flytrap appears from out of nowhere, causing them to flee. After overcoming dangerous obstacles and more monuments, Dan and Drago manage to locate the Ventana artifact. Before they can claim it, a swarm of flytraps start to attack them. Meanwhile, Lia is about to face Reed in their match, but instead, Reed decides to substitute a different Brawler in his place since Viloch is still recovering from his last battle, revealed to be Strata. During the battle, Harperion seems to have the upper hand despite his lack of cooperation with Strata, but Fenneca makes a successful comeback. Strata summons Insectra who overpowers and restrains Fenneca, but before he can finish her off, Fenneca breaks free as Lia summons Arachnia who successfully defeat's both Insectra and Harperion, thus winning the match. This also means that Viloch has been eliminated from the competition, which he doesn't consider a problem. Meanwhile, Dan and Drago are still attempting to fight off the flytraps, to no avail. Dan, who now fully understands what the message means, tells Drago to allow the flytraps to capture him, much to his reluctance. Nevertheless, he does so anyway as the flytraps drag both of them into the pit. Much to their surprise, they discover the actual Ventana artifact; the one from above was just a fake. After reading the Ventana message, the artifact's energy suddenly merges with Drago, having realized that they're just here to borrow it for a while in order to win the tournament. With only three artifacts left to go, the search continues.
247	22a	"The Battle of Haora!"; Transliteration: "Hito to Bakugan" (Japanese: 人と爆丸)	August 15, 2021 (CAN); September 15, 2021 (US)	January 21, 2022
In Haora (the Haos Realm), Dan prepares to face Jenny in their match despite being warned that she's a tough opponent. Meanwhile, Jenny decides to do an experiment that involves summoning a Geogan at will, believing that it will help her win the match. As the battle commences, the arena begins to shift apart, which is not a big deal. Since he has the advantage in this realm because Drago can fly, Dan nearly defeats Jenny. However, Jenny reveals her experiment to them and summons Sky Horse who starts to overpower Drago, nearly defeating him in the process. Dan criticizes Jenny for mistreating her Bakugan just to get a Geogan, prompting him to use his newfound determination to make a successful comeback, and as a result, he successfully defeats Sky Horse. Crustillion starts to get upset at Jenny for mistreating him like that, but before he can attack her, Drago defeats him, thus winning the match and explains to Jenny that Bakugan like Crustillion aren't meant to be mistreated like that and advises her to learn from this experience. Fenneca, who has been hearing a strange ringing sound, goes to investigate the source and discovers that it's coming from this orb of light. When she touches it, it transforms into a few birds which suddenly fly away, leading her to deduce that this is the Haora Artifact. Dan and Drago then go to retrieve the artifact.
248	22b	"Chase the Haora Artifact!"; Transliteration: "Haorā no Ātifakuto o Oe" (Japanese: ハオラーのアーティファクトを追え)	August 15, 2021 (CAN); September 15, 2021 (US)	January 21, 2022
Dan and Drago are searching for the Haora Artifact that has taken the form of six birds made of light. They locate them and realize that they have to catch all of them, thinking that this is a test that they must pass. Before they can catch one of them, Drago unexpectedly reverts to his ball form, causing Dan to fall fast. Luckily, he manages to grab hold of a nearby structure. Drago deduces that their previous battles and the search for the remaining artifacts were the reason he reverted to his ball form. Nevertheless, Dan decides to continue on manually while giving Drago a break. He manages to locate a bird and grabs it, which suddenly transforms into a ball of light that merges with Drago, prompting them to collect the rest of the birds. Meanwhile, Shun is about to face Everett in their match. After a fierce battle which brings them to the point of summoning Geogan, Shun decides to delay that action, thinking that Everett will use the footage to analyze his Geogan. Nevertheless, Everett summons Ghost Beast who creates a black mist to his advantage and easily overpowers Sharktar. Shun summons Stingzer, but despite their best efforts, Ghost Beast successfully defeat's both Stingzer and Sharktar, thus winning the match. In the meantime, Dan and Drago have collected all but one of the birds. Although they manage to catch the last bird using their teamwork, Dan suddenly falls but is rescued by Magnus who has discovered what he and Drago have been up to. The balls of light suddenly transform into the Haora Artifact where its energy merges with Drago. Suddenly, a gateway appears and drags both Dan and Magnus to an unknown place, much to their complete shock.
249	23a	"True Power"; Transliteration: "Magunasu no Negai" (Japanese: マグナスの願い)	August 22, 2021 (CAN); September 15, 2021 (US)	February 4, 2022
Picking up where we left off after the gateway took Dan and Magnus to a strange place, most likely somewhere in Vestroia, they start to get into an argument about the fate of Earth and Vestroia, with Magnus proclaiming that the reason he joined up with Viloch is because he still intends to settle their score, not caring about what will happen to the two planets to begin with. Dan prepares to battle him, but all of a sudden, Drago and Nillious discover that he and Magnus have been turned into little kids and starts to recognize this place as the same one that recently turned the AB, including Dan into little kids. Dan and Magnus get chased by a swarm of flytraps, causing them to fall into a river leading to a whirlpool. Drago and Nillious chase after them as they enter the whirlpool through another gateway. Dan and Magnus soon wake up, having been restored to their normal ages. Dan soon learns from Magnus that they're in Darkavia (the Darkus Realm) where the next matches will take place because he has been here before. At the Darkavia arena, before Pyravian can declare Lightning the winner, Magnus arrives just in time for their match. As the battle commences, Magnus seems to be winning, but Lightning summons Montrapod who overpowers Nillious. Nearly defeated, Magnus runs towards Nillious, but much to his unexpected surprise, Nillious starts to speak to him. He reveals that the effect in the maze, mainly from the river must have somehow made Magnus a little younger, which has given him the ability to talk to Bakugan like Nillious. Now that he is a true Brawler, Magnus removes his device and prepares to continue the battle with his new strength and bond with Nillious. Together, they successfully defeat both Montrapod and Ferascal, thus winning the match as they celebrate their victory.
250	23b	"Showdown in Darkavia!"; Transliteration: "Dākabia no Shiren" (Japanese: ダーカビアの試練)	August 22, 2021 (CAN); September 15, 2021 (US)	February 4, 2022
Dan and Drago are searching for the Darkavia Artifact, with no luck whatsoever. They soon meet a new Bakugan named Ninjiton, the guardian of the Darkavia Artifact who has heard about them from Pyravian. He agrees to direct them to the Darkavia Artifact but tells them that the only way to claim it is to conquer the darkness that is capable of playing tricks on their minds. He warns them that if they fail, they will be forced to roam through the darkness forever. Ninjiton directs Dan and Drago to a door that will lead them to the artifact in which they will have to conquer the darkness in order to claim it. Upon entering it, Dan gets separated from Drago, but somehow reunites with him pretty quickly. However, he suggests that he rest for a while, which he agrees to do. However, on the other side, Dan suggests the same thing to Drago, unaware of what's really happening here. After a while, both of them discover that after finding out that they would never say anything about giving up, they suddenly realize the deception after encountering their illusions created by the darkness attempting to trick them into giving up. Having made a vow that they would conquer the darkness together, Dan and Drago destroy the illusions, causing the Darkavia Artifact to appear before them as Drago claims it. Afterwards, a door appears as they make their way out. Reuniting with Ninjiton, he explains that the mirror inside was the cause of their illusions which they managed to overcome, thus passing the test. With only one artifact left, Dan and Drago leave for Pyrule to retrieve it. At the same time, Lia prepares to face Magnus in their match. During the battle, Magnus, who is now relying on his new strength due to his strong bond with Nillious gains the upper hand on Lia. Lia summons Arachina, prompting Magnus to do the same by summoning Hyenix. However, both Geogan end up knocking each other out. Nevertheless, Magnus successfully defeats Lia, thus winning the match, and earning his place in the finals ready to battle Dan once and for all (if he wins against Everett). Elsewhere, Dan and Drago arrive in Pyrule in search of the Pyrule Artifact.
251	24a	"The Trial of Pyrule"; Transliteration: "Honō no Kizuna" (Japanese: 炎の絆)	August 29, 2021 (CAN); September 15, 2021 (US)	February 18, 2022
In Pyrule (the Pyrus Realm), the AB become concerned about Dan and Drago making it back in time for their match against Everett because they still have to retrieve the Pyrule Artifact. Ferascal comes up with a plan where she starts an argument with Fenneca, which then escalates into a fight, with Pincitaur joining in. According to Ferascals plan, it is revealed that she staged this fight in order to stall for time. Meanwhile, Dan and Drago arrive at a volcano called Gans Certus, thinking that the Pyrule Artifact is there. They soon meet Behemos, an old friend of Drago and the guide to the Pyrule Artifact. He says that the artifact is on top of the volcano, but warns Dan that it's dangerous because it's covered in thick smoke, making it impossible to reach the volcano by air. The only way to reach the top of the volcano is on foot. The journey to the top begins as Dan, Drago, and Behemos make their way through the dangerous obstacles that stand in their way. Worried that he'll lose more strength if he keeps going like this, Dan suggests to Drago that he rest for a while, which he reluctantly agrees to do, leaving Dan to continue the journey on foot with Behemos despite his protests, claiming that it's too dangerous for a human like him. Nearing the top, Behemos suggests that they take a different approach where he tells Dan to do what he does, and it turns out that they adjusted their sight in order to see in the dark, giving them the chance to anticipate the right moment to move fast. Moving on forward, Dan accidentally drops Drago just as a flow of lava comes rolling down the volcano. Luckily, he manages to grab him in time as they escape the lava flow. Dan and Behemos eventually arrive at the temple where the Pyrule Artifact is located. Suddenly, the temple starts to collapse with the artifact still inside. Luckily, Drago manages to retrieve it as its energy suddenly merges with him, which means that he now has all the artifacts in his possession. Meanwhile, the Bakugan have tired themselves out from their staged fight. Viloch eventually finds out that Dan and Drago have been collecting the ancient artifacts to begin with. Before he can declare Everett the winner, Dan and Drago manage to arrive in time as they prepare to face him in their match, determined to win this once and for all.
252	24b	"Passing Through Darkness"; Transliteration: "Yami o Koete Ike" (Japanese: 闇を越えて行け)	August 29, 2021 (CAN); September 15, 2021 (US)	February 18, 2022
Dan is about to face Everett in the second match of the semi-finals. Although he has collected all of the artifacts, he still doesn't know what to do next. Pyravian tells Dan that the power of the artifacts can only be unlocked when a true warrior is in need of them. Dan and Everett begin their match, with Dan gaining the upper hand on him. Everett summons Ghost Beast who creates the same black mist in an attempt to win the same way as he did before against Shun in Haora, easily overpowering Drago in the process. Nearly defeated, Dan suggests that they try to call the power of the artifacts, to no avail. He then summons Arcleon who starts attacking randomly as directed, thinking that it's Ghost Beast, but it turns out to be a trap, and it is revealed that Everett used the black mist to create an illusion in order to trick Dan into using most of Arcleon's power. This results in Ghost Beast easily defeating Arcleon. Dan is nearly defeated, until Magnus and Nillious appear and encourage him to not give up on this battle because he is destined to face them in the final battle, giving Dan and Drago the motivation needed to continue. Dan, remembering what he did with Behemos on the volcano advises Drago to do what he does, and as a result, they successfully land an attack on Ghost Beast since they anticipated his location in the mist by adjusting their sight so that they can see in the dark. Everett creates an illusion in order to turn the tides in his favor, but Dan and Drago manage to see through his trick, and as a result, they successfully defeat Ghost Beast along with Oxidox, thus winning the match, and earning their place in the finals. It all comes down to this as Dan and Magnus prepare for the final battle against each other.
253	25a	"The Fateful Final Battle!"; Transliteration: "Dan VS Magunasu" (Japanese: ダンVSマグナス)	September 5, 2021 (CAN); September 15, 2021 (US)	March 4, 2022
The final battle between Dan and Magnus is about to begin. In this battle, in order to prevent any unfair faction advantages, the battle arena will take place in both Pyrule and Darkavia, each split in half. As the battle commences, Dan and Magnus seem to be evenly matched, but Dan, still determined to prevent Earth and Vestroia from being separated, mainly because of his strong bond with Drago makes a successful comeback, nearly defeating Nillious in the process. Viloch suddenly interrupts the battle and attempts to manipulate Magnus into using the six Geocores that will give Nillious ultimate power so that he can win, causing him to hesitate on that matter. Reed attempts to use the Geocores on Nillious anyways, but Magnus uses the travel stone to prevent that from happening and proclaims that it wouldn't be a fair battle if he used the ultimate power, because he would rather use his own power instead. Even though the Battle Judgement isn't over yet, on Viloch's urging, Reed gives him the Geocores, forming Ultimate Viloch in the process. More than that, his true maniacal nature has finally been revealed.
254	25b	"Invincible Viloch"; Transliteration: "Kyūkyoku no Hate" (Japanese: 究極の果て)	September 5, 2021 (CAN); September 15, 2021 (US)	March 4, 2022
Viloch's true maniacal nature has finally been revealed. He starts off by summoning the six faction crystals where he intends to use their power to rise up beyond its limitations, and separate Earth and Vestroia by destroying the Great Nexus that binds the two planets together. Reed suddenly realizes that Viloch used him all along because after he used the Healing Core Cell to call forth the Geogan, Viloch obtained the power to summon the faction crystals. Feeling betrayed, Reed summons Spartillion, but he suddenly turns on him and reveals that he only teamed up with him because Viloch told him to. Pyravian and Goreene attempt to stop Viloch from using the power of the faction crystals, but he easily overpowers them. Magnus joins in but is forced to deal with Spartillion first. The AB rally together with Dan to take on Viloch, but despite their best efforts, Viloch easily overpowers them all. In a surprising turn of events, the AB state their own reasons and opinions on why they need Bakugan in their lives, and as a result, the power of the faction artifacts begin to activate. They then summon all of their Geogan which start to combine with Drago. Following the completion of the transformation process, Dan and the newly Geogan combined Drago prepare to battle and defeat Ultimate Viloch once and for all, with the fate of Earth and Vestroia resting in their hands.
255	26a	"Geo-Forge Drago!"; Transliteration: "Jiofōji Doragonoido" (Japanese: ジオフォージドラゴノイド)	September 12, 2021 (CAN); September 15, 2021 (US)	March 18, 2022
Now that Drago has been combined with the AB's Geogan, becoming Geo-Forge Dragonoid in the process, he prepares to battle and defeat Viloch alongside Dan, determined to stop him from separating Earth and Vestroia. He starts off by overpowering Viloch with his new power level, but Viloch absorbs the remaining faction crystals and overpowers him, nearly defeating him in the process. At one point, Crystal Blue begins to sense the Geogan suffering from being combined with Viloch. Jenny reveals that she recently visited the home of the Geogan, which gave her the ability to sense and feel both Bakugan and Geogan. Not only that, her assistance was the reason Jenny and the others were able to call forth the Geogan. In a shocking turn of events, Viloch summons the Great Nexus and prepares to destroy it, which will separate the two planets for good, with the intent of destroying Earth as well. However, since Drago still has everyone's power inside of him, he believes that they can save the Earth as well by lending their strength to him. As a result of this inspiration, the AB's Bakugan begin to transfer their power to Drago by resonating with the artifacts. The final showdown continues as Dan and Drago prepare to stop Viloch from destroying the Great Nexus once and for all.
256	26b	"At the End of the Fight..."; Transliteration: "Mirai o Tsunagu Mono" (Japanese: 未来を繋ぐもの)	September 12, 2021 (CAN); September 15, 2021 (US)	March 18, 2022
Dan and Drago still have a fighting chance to stop Viloch from destroying the Great Nexus since the Bakugan have transferred their powers to him because they're resonating with the artifacts. Despite making a successful comeback, Viloch begins to increase his power, which is sensed by Crystal Blue because it's only a matter of time before the Geogan's life force is depleted. In a surprising turn of events, Drago, relying on his strong bond with Dan summons all of the AB's former Bakugan as they share their power with him. He then strikes Viloch with an ultimate final attack, defeating him at last. Following their victory, Arcleon begins to explain that Geogan live to offer their assistance to those who need it while Insectra states that their power caused many victims to suffer. However, Crystal Blue admits that it was their fault because she and her allies were the ones that called for them in the first place. Although Reed was the one that summoned the Geogan in the first place, he claims that he had no idea that his actions would put Earth in danger to begin with. Now that the crisis is over, Dan proclaims that the Geogan are no longer needed although he did have fun battling alongside them. In the aftermath, Pyravian announces that the Council will guard the Great Nexus to ensure that it will never be threatened again, along with the faction crystals and artifacts as well. In a saddened turn of events, Drago tells Dan that he can't go with him back to Earth just yet because as a member of the Supreme Council, he has some things to do first on Vestroia, such as deciding Viloch's punishment, and choosing guardians for the six artifacts and crystals. Therefore, Pyravian asks Sharktar, Falcron, Fenneca, Ferascal, and Pincitaur to become those guardians, much to the AB's shock, meaning that they won't be able to return to Earth with them. Nevertheless, the Bakugan agree to guard the artifacts and crystals from every evil force that will try to use them for evil purposes, if it means protecting the Earth in the process. Back on Earth, the AB learn from a news report that Reed has been identified as the leader of a gang of thieves suspected of committing a string of Bakugan thefts. They also learn that Jenny is traveling with Crystal Blue in search of Bakugan. Suddenly, a gateway opens up outside as the AB are reunited with Drago and their original main partners. Elsewhere, the Junk Island Bakugan (formally partnered up with the AB) continue to remain in the faction realms, standing guard over the artifacts and crystals against opposing threats, while also entrusting Drago to protect the AB in their place.
