= Spotlight (Canadian TV program) =

- Genre: Current affairs
- Presented by: Doug Collins
- Country of origin: Canada
- Original language: English
- No. of seasons: 1

Production
- Producer: Mike Poole

Original release
- Network: CBC Television
- Release: 17 July – 4 September 1975

Spotlight is a Canadian current affairs television program which aired on CBC Television from July to September 1975.

== Overview ==
This interview program featured guests such as separatist Quebec premier René Lévesque, politicians Bob Andras and Philip Givens, conservationist Roderick Haig-Brown and Auditor General Maxwell Henderson.

== Scheduling ==
This half-hour program was broadcast Thursdays at 10:30 p.m. (Eastern time) from 17 July to 4 September 1975.
