= List of card games related anime and manga =

This list does not contain anime and manga that were either just the basis-or-inspiration for a card game created afterwards (examples include Final Fantasy TCG, Fire Emblem: Trading Card Game, Pokémon TCG...) or created at same time as anime/manga (examples include Juvenile Orion, Kaijudo...), and don't feature playing cards as in-universe items.

== List of anime and manga featuring playing cards ==
List of manga, anime, OVA, ONA in which playing cards as items are either featured as a source of power of the holder/owner (i.e. playing cards are major part of the power system in the universe) or used in a card game that is played, i.e. contested among characters, as part of the plot in the universe. In the latter case it's commonly known as a card game anime/manga. That is, stories that have some kind of card game mechanics (collecting and/or trading of cards, card play between characters, end of the turn/hand, winning a hand...). In some cases those manga/anime/OVA/ONA also originates from a card game.

Legend:

TCG - trading card game / collectible card game (CCG)
LCG - living card game
CBG - card battle game
DCG - digital card game
SNG - social network game
— doesn't exist (specifically for card games or card decks it means they don't exist in real life, they are in-universe only items)
Note: TCGs (and other variants) are usually named in the following fashion "Franchise's name Trading Card Game" (or "Franchise's name TCG" for short), but in this table the order is reversed, that is "TCG Franchise's name" is used, to optimize sorting.

Anime		Manga		Original medium			Playable card game -OR- Card deck		Ref(s)
Year	Title	Year	Title	Year	Creator(s)	Medium	Year	Type	Ref(s)
2012	Aikatsu!	—	—	2012	Bandai	Arcade TCG Aikatsu!	2012	ATCG Aikatsu!	
2021	Aikatsu Planet!	—	—	2020	Bandai	Arcade TCG Aikatsu Planet!	2020	ATCG Aikatsu Planet!	
—	—	2000	Aim to Be a Card Master!	2000	Interu	manga	?	TCG Pokémon	
—	—	2019	Akito Seems to Draw a Card	2019	Tsukumo Asakusa, Ryogo Kawada	manga	—		
2016	Ange Vierge	—	—	2014	Sega	Online TCG Ange Vierge	2014	OTCG Ange Vierge	
—	—	before 2012	Animal Kaiser	2007	Bandai Namco Entertainment	Arcade TCG Animal Kaiser	2007	TCG Animal Kaiser	
2006	BakéGyamon	2006	BakéGyamon	2006	Mitsuhisa Tamura, Kazuhiro Fujita	manga	—	?	
2023	Bakugan	—	—	2006/07	Sega Toys, Spin Master, Nelvana Limited	?	?	?	
2007	Bakugan Battle Brawlers	—	—	2006/07	Sega Toys, Spin Master, Nelvana Limited	anime/TCG Bakugan	2006	TCG Bakugan	
2018	Bakugan: Battle Planet	—	—	2006/07	Sega Toys, Spin Master, Nelvana Limited	?	?	?	
2012	Baku Tech! Bakugan	2010	Baku Tech! Bakugan	2006/07	Sega Toys, Spin Master, Nelvana Limited	?	?	?	
2008	Battle Spirits Series	—	—	2008	Bandai, Sunrise, Inc.	TCG Battle Spirits	2008	TCG Battle Spirits	
—	—	2017	Battling with an Elf Deck	2017	Kurou Ooma, Takashi Watanabe	manga	—	TCG Magic Walker	
2021	Build Divide	—	—	2021	Homura Kawamoto, Hikaru Muno	anime/TCG Build Divide	2021	TCG Build Divide	
2011	[C] – The Money of Soul and Possibility Control	—	—	2011	Noboru Takagi	anime	—	Midas Cards	
1998	Card Captor Sakura	1996	Card Captor Sakura	1996	Clamp	manga	—	Clow Cards, Sakura Cards, Clear Cards	
2011	Cardfight!! Vanguard	2010	Cardfight!! Vanguard	2010	Akira Itō, Satoshi Nakamura, Mitsuhisa Tamura, Takaaki Kidani	anime/manga/TCG Cardfight!! Vanguard	2011	TCG Cardfight!! Vanguard	
—	—	2003	Chaosic Rune	2003	Kenji Yamamoto	manga	?	?	
2012	Chōsoku Henkei Gyrozetter	2012	Chōsoku Henkei Gyrozetter	2012	Square Enix	Arcade TCG Chōsoku Henkei Gyrozetter	?	Machine Cards	
2011	Chihayafuru	2007	Chihayafuru	2011	Yuki Suetsugu	manga	n/a	karuta	
—	—	2022	Cipher Academy	2022	Nisio Isin, Yūji Iwasaki	manga		poker cards (Leaky Poker)	
2013	Day Break Illusion	2013	Day Break Illusion	2013	Haruyasu Akagi, Hidenori Tanaka, Michiko Itō	anime	n/a	tarot cards	
—	—	2018	Destroy All Humans. They Can't Be Regenerated.	1993	Wizards of the Coast	TCG Magic: The Gathering	1993	TCG Magic: The Gathering	
—	—	2024	Digimon Liberator	2024		online manga	—	TCG Digimon	
2001	Digimon Tamers	2004	Digimon Tamers	2001	Akiyoshi Hongo	anime	—	TCG Digimon	
2007	Ancient Ruler Dinosaur King DKidz Adventure	2006	Dinosaur King	2005	Sega	Arcade TCG Dinosaur King	2008	ATCG&TCG Dinosaur King	
2014	Dragon Collection	2011	Dragon Collection	2010	Konami	SNG Dragon Collection	?	?	
2002	Dragon Drive	2001	Dragon Drive	2001	Kenichi Sakura	manga	—	Dragon cards	
2002	Duel Masters (2002–?)	1999	Duel Masters (1999–2002)	1993	Wizards of the Coast	TCG Magic: The Gathering	1993	TCG Magic: The Gathering	
?	Duel Masters (since ?)	2002	Duel Masters (since 2002)	2002	Shigenobu Matsumoto	manga	2002	TCG Duel Masters	
2006	Duel Masters Flash	—	—	2006	Koji Ueda	anime	2002	TCG Duel Masters	
2017	Elegant Yokai Apartment Life	2011	Elegant Yokai Apartment Life	2003	Hinowa Kōzuki	light novel	n/a	tarot cards	
2015	Exchange Student Zero	—	—	2015		anime			
2013	Fantasista Doll	2013	Fantasista Doll	2013	Toho, Gorō Taniguchi	anime	—	TCG Fantasista Dolls	
2007	Fate/kaleid liner Prisma Illya	2013	Fate/kaleid liner Prisma Illya	2007	Hiroshi Hiroyama, Type-Moon	manga	—	Class Cards	
2014	Future Card Buddyfight	2013	Future Card Buddyfight	2013/14	Bushiroad	Online TCG Future Card Buddyfight	2013/14	OTCG Future Card Buddyfight	
2014	Gigant Big-Shot Tsukasa			2014	Bushiroad, Toru Hosokawa	anime	—	Menko cards	
2023	High Card	2022	High Card -♢9 No Mercy	2022/23	Homura Kawamoto, Hikaru Muno	anime/manga	n/a	poker cards (X-Playing cards)	
1999	Hunter × Hunter Greed Island Arc	1998	Hunter × Hunter Greed Island Arc	1998	Yoshihiro Togashi	manga	—	TCG (Specified Slot Cards, Spell Cards, Free Slot Cards, Game Master-only Cards)	
—	—	2017	Ijin Game!! (Great Man Game)	2017	Katou Hironobu	manga	—	TCG Grateful Magic	
2011	Kaiji: Against All Rules	1996	Kaiji	1996	Nobuyuki Fukumoto	manga	—	various (Note: Restricted Rock–Paper–Scissors game and E-Card game in Gambling Apocalypse: Kaiji, One Poker game in Tobaku Datenroku Kaiji: One Poker-hen)	
—	—	1999	King of Cards	1999	Makoto Tateno	manga	—	TCG Chaos	
2012	La storia della Arcana Famiglia	2011	La storia della Arcana Famiglia	2011	HuneX	visual novel	n/a	tarot cards	
2008	Live On Cardliver Kakeru	?	Live On Cardliver Kakeru	?	Choji Yoshikawa, POPLAR Publishing Co.	TCG Live Battle Card: Live On	?	TCG Live Battle Card: Live On	
2016	Lostorage incited WIXOSS & Lostorage conflated WIXOSS	—	—	2014	Hobby Japan	TCG WIXOSS	2014	TCG WIXOSS (LRIGs)	
2016	Luck & Logic	—	—	2016	Bushiroad, Bandai Visual, Doga Kobo, Nitroplus, Lantis, Yuhodo	anime/TCG Luck & Logic	—	Logic Cards	
—	—	2012	Magical Girl Lyrical Nanoha Innocent	2012	Masaki Tsuzuki, Shuuichi Kawakami	manga	—	TCG Brave Duel	
—	—	2014	Magical Girl Lyrical Nanoha Innocents	2014	Masaki Tsuzuki, Shuuichi Kawakami	manga	—	TCG Brave Duel	
2014	Majin Bone	2014	Majin Bone	??	Bandai	DCG Majin Bone	??	DCG Majin Bone (Bone cards)	
2021	Mazica Party	—	—	2021	Takara Tomy, Dentsu	anime/TCG Mazica Party	2021	TCG Mazica Party (Mazin cards)	
2005	Mix Master	—	—	2003	Cymedia	MMORPG, Mix Master Online	—	Hench cards	
2000	Mon Colle Knights	1999	Mon Colle Knights	1997	Hitoshi Yasuda, Group SNE	TCG Monster Collection	1997	TCG Monster Collection (Monster cards)	
2014	Oreca Battle	2012	Monster Retsuden Oreca Battle	2012	Konami	Arcade TCG Monster Retsuden Oreca Battle	2012	TCG Monster Retsuden Oreca Battle	
2004	Negima! Magister Negi Magi	2003	Negima! Magister Negi Magi	2003	Ken Akamatsu	manga	—	Pactio cards	
2008	Persona	1996	Persona	1996	Atlus	video game	n/a	tarot cards	
—	—	1986	Poker King	1986	Yuuki Ishigaki, Masaru Miyazaki	manga	—	poker cards	
2004	Pretty Cure	?	Pretty Cure	2004	Izumi Todo	anime	—	Pretty Cure Cards, Dream Cards, PreCards	
2020	Rebirth	—	—	2020	Bushiroad	TCG Rebirth for you	2020	TCG Rebirth for you	
2011	Redakai	—	—	?	?	anime or TCG Redakai	?	TCG Redakai	
2011	Rio: Rainbow Gate!	—	—	2003	Tecmo	pachinko games Rakushou! Pachi-Slot Sengen	—	Gate cards	
2007	Saint October	2006	Saint October	2007	Konami	anime	n/a	tarot cards	
2010	Scan2Go	—	—	2010	d-rights, NewBoy	anime	—	Power cards, Turbo cards	
2014	Selector Infected WIXOSS & Selector Spread WIXOSS & Selector Destructed WIXOSS & Selector Stirred WIXOSS	—	—	2014	Hobby Japan	TCG WIXOSS	2014	TCG WIXOSS (LRIGs)	
2020	Shadowverse	—	—	2016	Cygames	Online TCG Shadowverse	2016	OTCG Shadowverse	
2000	Shinzo (Mushrambo)	—	—	2000	Izumi Todo, Mayori Sekijima	Anime	—	En-Cards	
2016	Soul Buster (Note: Based on the classic Chinese novel, Romance of the Three Kingdoms by Luo Guanzhong, Soul Buster Card Game presents the story in modern day China. The Soul Buster Card Game was adapted into an anime.)	?	Soul Buster	?	?	card game or manhua	?	TCG Soul Buster	
—	—	2025	The Strongest Summoner Is a Thirty-Something Guy: The Other World Domination of a Card Gamer Whose Cards Were Disposed of by His Parents	2025	Benigashira, Muramitsu	manga	—		
2009	Summer Wars	2009	Summer Wars	2009	Mamoru Hosoda, Madhouse	anime	n/a	hanafuda	
2007	Tai Chi Chasers	?	?	?	?	?	—	Tai Chi cards	
—	—	2005	Touhou Sangetsusei		ZUN Soft	video game	—	Spell cards	
2015	Turning Mecard	—	—	2014	Sonokong, Choirock	Toyline Turning Mecard	?	?	
—	—	2017	UNBOY	2017	Narack	manga		?	
2016	We're Luck&Logic Club! (Note: It does not share the same universe with the other media in the Luck & Logic franchise. It was aired during the one minute before every episode of the Luck & Logic anime, and will be continued along with new anime series. All episodes can be found on Youtube and Blu-Ray.)	—	—	2016	Bushiroad, Bandai Visual, Doga Kobo, Nitroplus, Lantis, Yuhodo	anime/TCG Luck & Logic	2016	TCG Luck & Logic	
2009	Weiss Survive	?	Weiss Survive	?	Bushiroad, Takuya Fujima	anime/manga	2008	TCG Weiß Schwarz	
2021	WIXOSS Diva(A)Live	—	—	2014	Hobby Japan	TCG WIXOSS	2014	TCG WIXOSS (LRIGs)	
—	—	2013	Wizard's Soul	2013	Aki Eda	manga	1993	TCG Magic: The Gathering	
1998	Yu-Gi-Oh!	1996	Yu-Gi-Oh!	1996	Kazuki Takahashi	manga	1999	TCG Yu-Gi-Oh!	
2014	Z/X: Ignition	2012	Z/X Zillions of enemy X	?	Nippon Ichi Software, Broccoli	TCG Z/X	?	TCG Z/X	
2019/20	Zenonzard The Animation	2019	?	?	Bandai Namco Entertainment	?	—	CBG Zenonzard	

== List of anime and manga that only originates from a card game ==
List of manga, anime, OVA, ONA that are based on a card game but the card game or the playing cards as in-universe items are not part of the plot, that is card game mechanics (collecting and/or trading of cards, card play between characters, end of the turn/hand, winning a hand...) is not part of the story.

Year	Title	Original medium			Ref(s)
Year	Title	Year	Creator(s)	Card game	Ref(s)
2002	Aquarian Age: Sign for Evolution	?	?	TCG Aquarian Age	
?	Force of Will the Movie	2012	Force of Will Inc.	TCG Force of Will	
2018	Lord of Vermilion: The Crimson King	2008	Square Enix	CCG Lord of Vermilion	
2015	Venus Project: Climax	2015	Galat	CBRPG Venus Project	

== See also (Similar; card game mechanics) ==
- Beast Saga, energy bodies with destructive power called "Godlots", where each one is composed of three parts, are scattered around the planet and collected
- Croket!, individuals called Bankers travel around the world to collect magical coins called Kinkas with their Kinka Banks
- Chronos Ruler, protagonist controls cards at will
- Dragon Nest: Shungeki no Sedo (2010) by TATSUBON, enchanted Power Stones are collected
- Enmusu (Renai Shusse Emaki En x Musu) (2002) by Takahiro Seguchi, talismans, of which there are 15 in existence, are collected for a prize
- M×0, magic plates are used to perform magic
- Magical Girl Lyrical Nanoha, magicians search and collect a set of 21 artifacts named the "Jewel Seeds"
- Magimoji Rurumo, magic tickets are used to perform magic
- Medabots (Medarot), Medafighters/Medarotters collect robot medals and Medaparts and use them with Medawatch/Medarotch in Robattles.
- Mega Man Battle Network, Battle Chips act as parallels to cards that are collectible and used to provide abilities during battles
- Monster Rancher, search and battles for Mystery Discs and Monster Tablets
- PriPara, PriTickets
- Psyren, Psyren calling cards
- The Rolling Girls, vigilantes search and collect moonlight stones that supposedly make a person possesses unlimited power when worn
- Smash Bomber (2006) by Hiroyuki Takei & DAIGO - individual and team battles with and for special discs, among which golden discs are the rarest
- Jackie Joson aka emcee in 2015/2016 created a two-part parody manga about the card game Uno
- Yo-kai Watch, instead of cards coin-like discs called Yo-kai Medals that are stored in a book called Yo-kai Medallium are used
- Chaotic a Danish trading card game that was later adapted for the United States with a TV series based on the cards inspired in Japanese series like Yu-Gi-Oh!
