= Zoobles! =

Miniature figure toys

- Type: Miniature figures
- Company: Spin Master; Sega Toys (licensor)
- Country: United States; Japan; South Korea
- Availability: 2010–present
- Materials: Plastic
- Slogan: "Spring to Life!" (2010-2012) "Pop Your World!" (2021-present)
- Official website

Zoobles! is a miniature figure toyline created by Spin Master. The toyline is a spin-off of the Bakugan toyline, meant to appeal to the female demographic. Zoobles! were released in August 2010 in the United States, consisting of a wide variety of sphere shaped animal creatures that could close into a ball and when placed on a magnetic stand called "Happitat", would open up into a unique figure. The success of the franchise resulted in the worldwide release of the Spin Master toyline, including Japan, where it is licensed by the Japanese toy division of Sega and has spun one Japanese-Korean animated series and a Nintendo DS game Zoobles! Spring to Life!. The toy line was short-lived, ending in 2012 and going on hiatus until 2021, when the toy line was relaunched with an all-new set of characters and a more modern, trendy theme.

== Terminology ==
=== Zoobles ===
The Zoobles are magical mischievous creatures whose gimmick is to roll into their ball forms. Depending on the canon, the series is divided into two in each regions. For the western versions, Zoobles live in the mystical Zooble Isle. Each Zooble was full of mischief and can also assume their ball forms to travel into great distances. In the Japanese version, the Zoobles were born in the Magical Candy Factory, each of them were based on sweets and flavors. They all live in the magical world of Candy Land, where they all live their daily lives.

=== Z-Girls ===
The Z-Girls, introduced in the 2021 reboot, are hooded humanoid girls who take on a two-step transformation gimmick: from ball to animal to Z-Girl. Their name is a pun on E-girl.

=== Worlds ===
Zooble Isle: Exclusive to the original western version, Zooble Isle is where all Zoobles live. The island is divided into 11 regions: Petagonia, Seagonia, Azoozia, Arctania, Chillville, Coraloo, Petal Point, Pinegrove, Jungelopolis, Rocktopia, and Cloud Cove.

Candy Land (キャンディランド, Kyandi Rando): Exclusive to the Japanese and Korean version, Candy Land is where all Zoobles live. The Zoobles in Candy Land were all born in the mystical Candy Factory (キャンディーファクトリー, Kyandīfakutorī), named after flavors and sweets and all live social lives throughout the world. Each region of Candy Land, including one called 'Beach City', was based on the regions of the original versions.

== Media ==
=== Anime ===
An anime adaptation of the toyline, titled Zoobles! (ズーブルズ!, Zūburuzu!) (Hangul: 쥬블스) was produced by Dong Woo Animation in Korea and premiered on May 18, 2011, on Seoul Broadcasting System. The series has been dubbed in Japanese and 4 episodes were shown on the Japanese website for promoting the toys in Japan. Later on, the series premiered in TV Tokyo's NoriNori♪Nori Suta block, alongside Trotting Hamtaro Dechu! and Spellbound! Magical Princess Lilpri in late 2011. The series later departed NoriNori♪Nori Suta block and had its official TV premiere on February 5, 2012, replacing Bakugan Battle Brawlers: Gundalian Invaders in its initial timeslot.

The series is written by Tetsuo Yasumi, best known as the head writer of the anime adaptation of Happy Happy Clover with Japanese producer Mitsuko Ohya of Duel Masters in charge of production. Character designs in the series were done by Nam Jong-Sik of Animal Yokochō and Kazuya Hayashi of Happy Happy Clover.

=== Videogame ===
An official simulation role-playing puzzle game to the toyline titled Zoobles! Spring to Life! was developed by Now Production of Japan and published by Activision for the Nintendo DS. It was released in November 2011 in United States and Europe. The game's limited edition came with one Zooble Figure.

== Reception ==
The toyline was awarded as the Best Girl Toy of the Year in 2011. In Japan, the toys had sold about 200,000 units in less than three months prior to its first release.

== See also ==
- Bakugan Battle Brawlers
- Baku Tech! Bakugan
- Vary Peri
