= Mecard =

Mecard may refer to

- MeCard (QR code), a data file in a QR code format, developed by NTT Docomo
- Turning Mecard, a South Korean toyline and media franchise developed for Sonokong by Choirock
  - Turning Mecard (TV series), a South Korean animated television series which is a part of the franchise
