= Suyama =

Suyama 陶山 須山 巣山 is a Japanese surname. Notable people with the surname include:

- Akio Suyama (陶山 章央, born 1968), video game and anime voice actor
- Shōtarō Suyama (須山 翔太郎), Japanese professional bodybuilder
- George Suyama (須山 翔太郎), Japanese-American architect
