= Heewon =

Heewon or Hee-won may refer to:

== People ==
- Kim Hee-won (born January 10, 1971), South Korean actor
- Han Hee-won (born June 10, 1978), South Korean retired golfer
- Kim Hee-won (ice hockey) (born August 1, 2001), South Korean ice hockey player

== Arts and entertainment ==
=== Entertainment ===
- Heewon Entertainment a South Korea company

=== Fictional Characters ===
- Heewon from the South Korean animated series The Haunted House
- Jung Heewon from the novel Webtoon Omniscient Reader's Viewpoint
