= Chung Misook =

South Korean voice actress (born 1962)

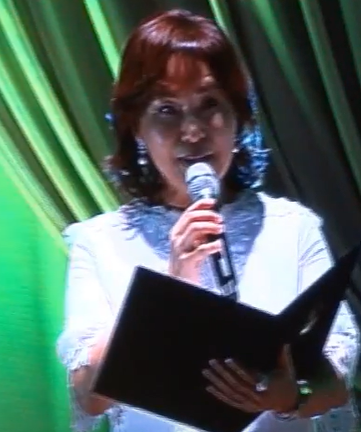
- Chung in 2017

Korean name
- Hangul: 정미숙
- Hanja: 鄭美淑
- RR: Jeong Misuk
- MR: Chŏng Misuk

Chung Misook (Korean: 정미숙; born December 25, 1962) is a South Korean voice actress who joined Seoul-based Korean Broadcasting System's voice acting division in 1984.

== Roles ==
=== Broadcast TV ===
- Pororo the Little Penguin (EBS) – Petty
- Clamp School Detectives (Korea TV Edition, Tooniverse) – Nokoru Imonoyama
- Pita-Ten (Korea TV Edition, Tooniverse) – Misha
- Futari wa Pretty Cure (Korea TV Edition, SBS) – Cure Black/Nagisa Misumi (Mook Ha-ram)
- Jang Geum's Dream (Korea TV Edition, MBC) – Seo Jang Geum
- One Piece (Korea TV Edition, KBS) – Nami
- Naruto (Korea TV Edition, Tooniverse) – Hitomi Uchiha
- Sailor Moon (Crew Folding) – Sailor Mercury
- Tokyo Mew Mew (Korea TV Edition, SBS) – Ichigo Momomiya
- InuYasha (Korea TV Edition, AnioneTV) – Kagome Higurashi (Yoo Ga-young)
- Shaman King (Korea TV Edition, AnioneTV) – Hao Asakura
- Kamikaze Kaito Jeanne (Korea TV Edition, Tooniverse) – Maron Kusakabe/Kaito Jeanne
- Magic Knight Rayearth (Korea TV Edition, SBS) – Hikaru Shidou (Sunny/Joo Eun-vit)
- The Irresponsible Captain Tylor (Korea TV Edition, Tooniverse)
- Nurse Angel Ririka SOS (Korea TV Edition, KBS) – Ririka Moriya
- Digimon Adventure (Korea TV Edition, KBS) – Taichi Kamiya (Shin Tae-il)
- Astro Boy (Korea TV Edition, SBS) – Astro Boy
- Cowboy Bebop (Korea TV Edition, Tooniverse) – Faye Valentine
- Erementar Gerad (Korea TV Edition, Tooniverse) – Cisqua
- Kanon (Korea TV Edition, Animax) – Nayuki Minase
- Mahojin Guru Guru (Korea TV Edition, Tooniverse) – Kukuri
- Element Hunters (Korea TV Edition, KBS) – Ren Karas
- Doug (Korea TV Edition) – Patti Mayonnaise
- Danny Phantom (Korea TV Edition) – Sam
- Flowering Heart (Korea TV Edition) – Ari Jin
- You're Under Arrest (Korea TV Edition, Tooniverse) – Noh Han-na
- The Fairly OddParents (Korea TV Edition) – Timmy Turner
- Hello Kitty's Paradise (Korea TV Edition, KBS) – Hello Kitty
- Dragon Ball (Korea TV Edition, Daewon TV) – Bulma

=== Film dubbing ===
- Harry Potter (replacing Emma Watson, Korea TV Edition, SBS)
- The Sixth Sense (replacing Haley Joel Osment, Korea TV Edition, KBS)
- Interview with the Vampire (replacing Kirsten Dunst, Korea TV Edition, MBC)
- Jumanji (replacing Kirsten Dunst, Korea TV Edition, SBS)
- Leon (replacing Natalie Portman, Korea TV Edition, KBS)
- Demolition Man (replacing Sandra Bullock, Korea TV Edition, SBS)
- Roman Holiday (replacing Audrey Hepburn, Korea TV Edition, SBS)
- Beauty and the Beast: The Enchanted Christmas (playing Belle, Walt Disney Pictures)
- Pocahontas II: Journey to a New World (playing Pocahontas, Walt Disney Pictures)
- The Lion King II: Simba's Pride (playing Adult Kiara, Walt Disney Pictures
- Anastasia (playing Anastasia "Anya", 20th Century Fox)
- Mulan (playing Mulan, Walt Disney Pictures)
- The Prince of Egypt (playing Miriam, DreamWorks Animation)
- Finding Nemo (playing Dory, Pixar)
- Bolt (playing Mittens, Walt Disney Pictures)
- Finding Dory (playing Dory, Stan's wife, Pixar)

=== Video games ===
- Magna Carta: Crimson Stigmata – Reith
- The War of Genesis Side Story II: Tempest – Elizabeth Pandragon
- Girlfriend of Steel – Asuka Langley Soryu
- Elsword – Rena
