= Akio Suyama =

Japanese voice actor (born 1968)

- Born: July 8, 1968 (age 58); Toyonaka, Osaka, Japan
- Occupation: Voice actor
- Years active: 1990–present

Akio Suyama (陶山 章央, Suyama Akio; born July 8, 1968) is a Japanese voice actor, affiliated with Sigma Seven. He was born in Toyonaka, Osaka. He is best known for voicing Ichiro Ogami in the Sakura Wars franchise.

== Voice roles ==
=== Anime ===
1990

- Ranma ½ (Employee B)
- Tanoshii Moomin Ikka (Additional Voices)

1994

- Macross 7 (Gabil, Physica)

1995

- Chibi Maruko-chan (Tsuyoshi Yamane, Sasaki-kun)

1996

- Reideen the Superior (Ikazuchi Takagi)
- Bakusō Kyōdai Let's & Go!! (Futoshi Kurozawa)

1997

- Crayon Shin-chan (Gaisha Nonin)
- Revolutionary Girl Utena (Danshiseito B, Person A)
- Nintama Rantarō (Kaizoku)
- Burn-Up Excess (Kan)
- Bakusō Kyōdai Let's & Go WGP!! (Futoshi Kurozawa, Huang)
- Pocket Monsters (Bad Trainer A)
- Perfect Blue (Tadashi Doi)

1998

- Initial D (Shouichi)
- Ojarumaru (Ojarumaru's Father, Haitatsunin, Takushi Kyaku, Gaikoku nonin, Sumisu, Ame Soraotton)
- Steam Detectives (Doria)
- Nazca (Shinri Shiogami)
- Outlaw Star (Fake Shimi, Prisoner)
- Sexy Commando Gaiden: Sugoi yo!! Masaru-san (Ishiguro, Sakana Juudou Chaku)
- DT Eightron (Man A, Bacharu Sekai no Hitotachi)
- Bakusō Kyōdai Let's & Go MAX!! (Bengaru)

1999

- Now and Then, Here and There (Tabool)
- Iris Rainbow Wing (Jun)
- Karakurizōshi Ayatsuri Sakon (Tamotsu Yoshida)
- Crest of the Stars (Saryush)
- Detective Conan (Ida Toshiyuki)

2000

- Sakura Wars (Ichiro Ogami)
- UFO Baby (Benkyou Uchuujin)
- Fighting Spirit (Danshiseito, Hachinohe Kentou Kai Renshuusei)
- The Candidate for Goddess (Yamagi Kushida)

2001

- Galaxy Angel (Patrick)
- Dennou Boukenki Webdiver (Oltorion)
- PaRappa the Rapper (Groober)
- Fruits Basket (Hatsuharu Soma / Haru)

2002

- Galaxy Angel II (Patrick, Security Force Member)
- Galaxy Angel A (Teacher, Patrick, Criminal, Alien, Man, Soldier, the other Mr. Pooh)
- Samurai Deeper Kyo (Jimon, Makora/Kotaro)
- Pocket Monsters Advanced Generation (Yūji)
- Duel Masters (Touban Jan)

2003

- Stellvia (Joy Jones)
- Wolf's Rain (Hige)
- Gunparade March (Yohei Takigawa)
- Cromartie High School (Hokuto No Kobun, Shijou Oyaji B)
- Ninja Scroll: The Series (Yadorigi)
- Pluster World (Honoo Tagan)

2004

- Agatha Christie's Great Detectives Poirot and Marple (Donald)
- Wind: A Breath of Heart (Tsutomu Tachibana)
- Superior Defender Gundam Force (Purio, Boufuu No Kishi Vaieito)
- Onmyō Taisenki (Ao Suzu No Nanaya)
- Galaxy Angel X (Cow, Interviewer, Man, Man A, Patrick, Warrior, White Cat)
- Samurai Champloo (Kazunosuke)
- Sweet Valerian (Sutoresu Dan)
- My-HiME (Sakomizu Kaiji-sensei)
- Detective Conan (Ootaki No Kouhai)
- Paranoia Agent (Masashi Kamei)

2005

- Kido Shinsengumi Moeyo Ken (Matsukata)
- Konjiki no Gash Bell!! (Gurabu)
- Black Cat (Gilberth)
- Tsubasa: Reservoir Chronicle (Sorata)
- Buzzer Beater (Julius)
- My-Otome (Sakomizu Cardinal)
- Rockman.EXE Stream (BlizzardMan)

2006

- Kirarin Revolution (Hiroto Kazama)
- Code Geass: Lelouch of the Rebellion (Kizuna Kagesaki)
- Shinseiki Duel Masters Flash (Kurenai Ki Chishio)
- Zenmai Zamurai (Namezaemon, Kawara Banban, Karasu Hoka)
- Tsubasa Chronicle (Sorata)
- Ghost Slayers Ayashi (Gorouta)
- .hack//Roots (Itta)
- Detective Conan (Mannaka Daijirou)
- Yume Tsukai (Keiki Shimane)
- Love Get Chu (Cameraman)

2007

- Yes! Precure 5 (Gamao)
- Gurren Lagann (Cytomander)
- Buzzer Beater (Julius)
- Venus Versus Virus (Guy)
- Pokémon Mystery Dungeon: Explorers of Time and Explorers of Darkness TV Special (Bulu)
- Majin Tantei Nōgami Neuro (Miki Eikichi)
- Yu-Gi-Oh! Duel Monsters GX (Birdman)
- Les Misérables: Shōjo Cosette (Babet)
- Romeo × Juliet (Petruccio)

2008

- Kure-nai (Man 1, Student A)
- Nabari no Ou (Hyou)
- Pokémon Diamond & Pearl (Shou)
- Detective Conan (Kanja, Hosoi Ryuu Taira)

2009

- Inazuma Eleven (Mamoru Nishigaki)
- Element Hunters (Tom Benson)
- Detective Conan (Participant)
- Rideback (Douta Kawai)

2010

- Heroman (Nick)
- Detective Conan (Shuichiro Tarumi)
- Beyblade: Metal Masters (Nile)
- Yumeiro Patissiere SP Professional (Johnny McBeal)

2011

- Cross Fight B-Daman (Gōichirō Tsukiwa)
- Toriko (Sedoru)
- Bakugan Battle Brawlers: Gundalian Invaders (Hopper)
- Metal Fight Beyblade 4D (Nile)
- Moshidora (Jirō Kashiwagi)

2012

- The Knight in the Area (Tako Otoko)
- Chō Soku Henkei Gyrozetter (Hane Michinori (Juu Ki)

2013

- Attack on Titan (Hugo)
- Hunter × Hunter (Binolt)
- Problem Children Are Coming from Another World, Aren't They? (Mikeneko)

2014

- Future Card Buddyfight (Davide Yamazaki)

2017

- ēlDLIVE (Tateyan)

2019

- Karakuri Circus (Brighella)

2021

- Dragon Quest: The Adventure of Dai (Zamza)
- D_Cide Traumerei the Animation (Junhei Oda)

2024

- Shibuya Hachi (Mi-ke)

2025

- Zenshu (QJ)

=== Games ===
1996

- Sakura Wars (Ichirō Ōgami)

1998

- EVE The Lost One (Eguni Yūji)
- Sakura Taisen 2 ~Kimi, Shinitamou koto Nakare~ (Ichirō Ōgami)
- Sakura Taisen Teigeki Graph (Ichirō Ōgami)
- Super Adventure Rockman (Bubble Man)
- Tail Concerto (Waffle Ryebread)

1999

- Itsuka, Kasanari au Mirai e (Shirō Aizawa)

2000

- Ogami Ichiro Funtouki ~Sakura Taisen Kayou Show "Benitokage" Yori~ (Ichirō Ōgami)

2001

- Final Fantasy X (Isaaru)
- Sakura Taisen 3 ~Pari wa Moeteiru ka~ (Ichirō Ōgami)

2002

- Sakura Taisen 4 ~Koi Seyo, Otome~ (Ichirō Ōgami)
- Unlimited Saga (Roy)
- Wind: A Breath of Heart (Tachibana Tsutomu)

2003

- Final Fantasy X-2 (Isaaru, Trema)
- Initial D Special Stage (Tsukamoto)
- Sakura Taisen ~Atsuki Chishio ni~ (Ichirō Ōgami)

2004

- Cherryblossom ~Cherryblossom~ (Sawamura)
- Kidō Senshi Gundam Seed: Owaranai Ashita e (Allied Earth Operator)
- Sakigake!! Kuromati Kōkō: Soreha Hyotto Shite Gēmuna no Ka!? Hen (Hokuto's Henchman)

2005

- 3rd Super Robot Wars Alpha: To the End of the Galaxy (Gabil)
- Front Mission 5: Scars of the War (Tango 5)
- Konjiki no Gash Bell!! Unare! Yuujou no Zakeru Dream Tag Tournament (Grubb)
- Mai-HiME: Unmei no Keitōju (Sakomizu Hirakichi)

2008

- Dramatic Dungeon Sakura Taisen ~Kimi aru ga tame~ (Ichirō Ōgami)
- Macross Ace Frontier (Gavil)
- Tales of Symphonia: Dawn of the New World (Decus)
- Tales of Vesperia (Zagi)

2011

- 2nd Super Robot Wars Z: Hakai-Hen (Cytomander)
- Call of Duty: Modern Warfare 3 (Sabre)
- Inazuma Eleven Strikers (Nishigaki Mamoru)
- Macross Triangle Frontier (Gavil)

2012

- Project X Zone (Ichirō Ōgami)

2013

- Chōsoku Henkei Gyrozetter: Arubarosu no Tsubasa (Hane Michinori)
- Super Robot Wars UX (Nick)
- Tales of Symphonia Chronicles (Decus)

2014

- Dolly ♪ Kanon: Doki Doki ♪ Toki Meki ♪ Himitsu no Ongaku Katsudō Sutāto De~e~su!! (Murasaki P)

2015

- Project X Zone 2 (Ichirō Ōgami, Zagi)
- Mighty No. 9 (Dr. SANDA, Seijiro SANDA)

=== Tokusatsu ===
2010

- Kaettekita Samurai Sentai Shinkenger (Ayakashi Demebakuto)

2011

- Kaizoku Sentai Gokaiger (Worian (ep. 19))

2012

- Tokumei Sentai Go-Busters (Fanloid (ep. 10))

2014

- Zyuden Sentai Kyoryuger (New Joyful Knight Killbolero (eps. 43 - 48))

2016

- Doubutsu Sentai Zyuohger (Cruiser (ep. 23))

=== Drama CDs ===
- Happy Time (Takeo)
- Shiawase ni Shite Agemasu (Rui Nakayama)

=== Dubbing roles ===
- The Dark Crystal: Age of Resistance, Hup
- Doug, Roger Klotz
