= Yonezawa Wave Hunter =

Radio controlled offroad buggy kit

Monogram Lightning / Yonezawa Wave Hunter
- Type: 1/10-scale electric radio-controlled offroad buggy
- Invented by: Yonezawa Toys (now SEGA Toys)
- Company: Yonezawa Toys (Japan) / Monogram Models (North America)
- Country: Japan (origin) / United States (licensed release)
- Availability: 1984–1989
- Materials: Plastic, electronic components

The Monogram Lightning was an early 1/10-scale electric radio controlled offroad buggy kit marketed in North America in 1984 by static kit manufacturer Monogram Models (now Revell-Monogram). A variation with slightly different bodywork was known as the Thunder.

Unlike Monogram's static models which were produced in the United States, both the Lightning and Thunder were produced in Japan by Yonezawa Toys and sold in their home market as the Wave Hunter.

The partially ready-to-run kits came equipped with Yonezawa's proprietary electronics and mechanical speed control for the drive motor preinstalled. Control was via a 27 MHz stick-type radio. Since the Yonezawa onboard electronics did not have a battery eliminator circuit, it was necessary to install four "AA" alkaline batteries in addition to the supplied 7.2-volt, 1200mAh nickel-cadmium battery pack for the Mabuchi RS-540 drive motor.

Since both cars were intended for the entry-level market, chassis layout was extremely simple. The modular rear end was located to the chassis tub by a hinge joint. Rear suspension damping was via a single vertically mounted spring shock absorber. The equally simple front suspension consisted of a trailing arm on either side, each damped by a spring shock.

Like models of the time from Tokyo Marui, the Monogram cars suffered from extremely brittle plastic components, easily broken in even a minor collision. By 1989, Monogram had quietly withdrawn from the radio control market.
