= List of Jang Geum's Dream episodes =

Episode title screen of Series Two Episode 3 "Occurrence at the Agricultural Festival" (선농제에서 생긴 일)

This is a list of episodes for the MBC animated television series Jang Geum's Dream.

== Series 1 ==
The DVD box set contains subtitles in Korean, English, and Japanese, including episode titles. The Japanese episode titles subtitles differ from NHK's episode titles. The NHK titles are listed below. No official English translations are available for the NHK episode titles.

Episode #	Korean Title	Japanese Title	Original air date
1	"Janggeum's Dream" (장금이의 꿈)	"Janggeum's Dream" (チャングムの夢)	October 29, 2005
2	"A Court Lady Selection Test" (생각시 선발시험)	"Apprentice Court Lady Selection Test" (見習い女官 選抜試験)	November 5, 2005
3	"The Taste of Nature" (자연의 맛)	"Taste of Nature" (自然の味)	November 12, 2005
4	"Mom's Table" (엄마의 밥상)	"Mother's Flavor" (母さんの味)	November 19, 2005
5	"Level-Up Test" (승급시험)	"Advancement Exam" (昇級試験)	November 26, 2005
6	"Never Ending Competition" (끝나지 않은 경합)	"Endless Cooking Competition" (果てしない料理対決)	December 3, 2005
7	"Seek Danji Lady" (단지할매를 찾아서)	"Legendary Pot Granny" (伝説の壷おばあさん)	December 10, 2005
8	"Daeryuk Inn & Sibling Inn" (대륙주막 오누이주막)	"Hotel Competition" (旅館対決)	December 17, 2005
9	"The Secret of Danji Granny" (단지할매의 비밀)	"Jeju Island's Test" (チェジュ島の試練)	December 31, 2005
10	"The First Mission Given by Danji" (단지할매의 첫 과제)	"Abalones and Sea Cucumbers" (アワビとナマコ)	January 7, 2006
11	"The Cave of Death" (죽음의 동굴)	"Eerie Cave" (不気味な洞くつ)	January 14, 2006
12	"Nature's Gift" (벌도사의 과제)	"Nature's Gift" (自然の贈り物)	January 21, 2006
13	"The Secret Danji Dish Recipe" (단지요리의 비법)	"Heart of Pot Cooking" (壷料理の心)	January 28, 2006
14	"Pirate Island" (해적섬)	"Pirate Island" (海賊島)	February 4, 2006
15	"Back to the Palace" (다시 궁으로)	"Daughter's Wish" (娘の願い)	February 11, 2006
16	"Ghost Disturbance" (귀신 대소동)	"Ghost Disturbance" (幽霊騒動)	February 18, 2006
17	"Conspiracy Uncovered" (드러나는 음모)	"Mastermind's Identity" (黒幕の正体)	February 25, 2006
18	"The Defeat of the Assassins" (자객단의 최후)	"Trap of Secrecy" (長官の罠)	March 4, 2006
19	"Gungjungmiseo" (궁중미서)	"Secret Book" (秘伝の書)	March 11, 2006
20	"Strange Cook" (괴짜 요리사)	"Strange Cooks" (風変わりな料理人)	March 18, 2006
21	"Temple Food" (산사 음식)	"Hawthorn Trees" (サンザシの木)	March 25, 2006
22	"Meju Village" (메주 마을)	"Miso King Village" (みそ玉村)	April 1, 2006
23	"Bad Harvest" (보릿고개)	"Famine Village" (飢きんの村)	April 8, 2006
24	"Search for Master Chefs" (달인을 찾아서)	"Master Visit" (達人を訪ねて)	April 15, 2006
25	"Cooking Contest" (요리경연대회)	"Cooking Contest" (料理大会)	April 22, 2006
26	"The Final Competition" (마지막 승부)	"Final Competition" (最後の勝負)	April 29, 2006

== Series 2 ==
No official English translations are available for season two episode.

Episode #	Korean Title	Original air date
1	"Running Toward a Dream" (꿈을 향해 달려라)	March 14, 2007
2	"Skirt Rock" (치마바위)	March 21, 2007
3	"Occurrence at the Agricultural Festival" (선농제에서 생긴 일)	March 28, 2007
4	"Shaved Ice and Dumplings" (빙수와 경단)	April 4, 2007
5	"The Ice Warehouse Incident" (빙고사건)	April 11, 2007
6	"Great Detective Janggeum" (명탐정 장금)	April 18, 2007
7	"Dano Festival" (단오제)	April 25, 2007
8	"Childhood Friend" (죽마고우)	May 2, 2007
9	"Wistfully, Love Begins" (애틋한 마음, 시작되는 사랑)	May 9, 2007
10	"Chrysanthemum Bride" (국화각시)	May 16, 2007
11	"Accused" (누명)	May 23, 2007
12	"Mount Kumgang Tiger" (금강산 호랑이)	May 30, 2007
13	"Tiger Village" "(호랑이 마을)	June 13, 2007
14	"Secret of the Red Letters" (붉은 글씨의 비밀)	June 20, 2007
15	"Disappearance of Jang Su-ro" (사라진 장수로)	June 27, 2007
16	"Calm Young Man" (버들도령)	July 4, 2007
17	"To a Precious Person" "(소중한 사람에게)	July 11, 2007
18	"Sun and Moon Protestantism" (일월신교)	July 18, 2007
19	"Secret of the Temple" (사원의 비밀)	July 25, 2007
20	"Forest of Death" "(죽음의 숲)	August 1, 2007
21	"Silver Sea's Whirlpoor" (은빛바다의 소용돌이)	August 8, 2007
22	"Unexpected Encounter" (뜻밖의 만남)	August 22, 2007
23	"Signs of Mother" (엄마의 흔적)	August 29, 2007
24	"Last Chance" "(마지막 기회)	September 5, 2007
25	"Conspiracy Scapegoat" (음모의 희생양)	September 12, 2007
26	"First Snowy Day" (첫눈 내린 날)	September 19, 2007

== Online viewing ==
Both series are available for time-limited viewing on MBC's website video on demand service.
