= Vary Peri =

2012 animated television series

- Also known as: Sweets Fairy; Magical Wizard Cake Fairy
- Genre: Adventure; Comedy; Magical Girl
- Created by: Auldey
- Developed by: Auldey
- Written by: Lu Lingyi; Wang Wei; Ming Riye
- Directed by: Han Feng
- Creative director: Wu Danting
- Presented by: Cai Dongqui
- Voices of: Deng Hong; Zhao Na; Zu Liqing; Zhao Ran; Liu Pei; Li Jing; Liao Chunyu
- Opening theme: "Vary Peri" by Zhang Lin
- Ending theme: "Vary Peri (Instrumental)"
- Composer: Huang Mingxuan
- Country of origin: China
- Original language: Mandarin Chinese
- No. of episodes: 40

Production
- Executive producer: Anthony Chen
- Editors: Lynette Li; Zhou Liang
- Running time: 23 minutes
- Production company: Alpha Group Company

Original release
- Network: JiaJia Kids; Youman Cartoon Satellite TV
- Release: 10 November – 16 December 2012

Vary Peri
- Chinese: 幻变精灵之蛋糕甜心
Transcriptions
Standard Mandarin
- Hanyu Pinyin: Huàn biàn jīnglíng dàngāo tiánxīn

Vary Peri (Chinese: 幻变精灵之蛋糕甜心; pinyin: Huàn biàn jīnglíng dàngāo tiánxīn), also called Sweets Fairy or Magical Wizard Cake Fairy is a Chinese Cel Shaded 3D Animated series animated by Alpha Group Company. It was produced by Anthony Chen, directed by Han Feng and written by Lu Lingyi, Wang Wei and Ming Riye. It first aired on the Satellite TV channel JiaJia Kids and later on Youman Cartoon Satellite in China TV from 10 November 2012 to 16 December 2012 with a total of 40 Episodes.

Vary Peri is officially based on the toys of the same name which utilizes a pop-up function when pressed. The overall theme of the series is Desserts and Sweets, as shown to the main characters and the setting. The series is very notable for copying various concepts from Spin Master and Sega Sammy Holdings's toy franchise Zoobles, particularly the Japanese/Korean Version.

== Story ==
The Sweetsheart Kingdom (Chinese: 甜心王国; pinyin: Tiánxīn wángguó) is a magical world filled with various sweets and pastries, inhabited by animal people who are good patisseries and cooks having their own expertise on each dessert. The kingdom's only Princess, Mousse Bibi is soon going to ascend to the throne as the new Queen, however all she cared for in life is to taste various kinds of cakes and sweets. One day, Lyan, her royal adviser, set up a plan by making her suffer Ageusia. As she is shocked that she can no longer taste anything, he told her that the only way to cure her condition is to search for the legendary magic called Delicious Miracle (Chinese: 美味奇迹; pinyin: Měiwèi qíjī). She immediately left the castle and venture outside, not knowing to her that Lyan is doing this to eradicate her.

Upon her arrival at the town called Cake Village (Chinese: 蛋糕村; pinyin: Dàngāo cūn), she first met a denizen of the village named Mocha Dennis, who is very obsessed on his looks. Though the meeting between both him and Bibi is unsettling. She is also unaware that she possesses a hidden potential that would help her search for the legendary magic and be the key on changing the fate of the Sweetsheart Kingdom.

== Characters ==
=== Cake Fairies ===
Mousse Bibi (Chinese: 慕斯比比; pinyin: Mùsī bǐbǐ)

Voiced by: Deng Hong

A Female Strawberry Mousse Cake Rabbit, Mousse Bibi is the Princess of the Sweetsheart Kingdom. She is very dimwitted yet kindhearted girl who likes to think big and has a playful and lively personality. Bibi also loves to eat sweets and watch anime, and she is very good at making tea but is very bad on baking. She rarely gets along with Mocha Dennis, though in the end she finally appreciates him as a friend. Her star sign is Gemini.

Bibi is supposed to ascend to the throne and become Queen until Lyan decided to make her suffer Aguesia, forcing her to go to the Cake Village to search for the Delicious Miracle, the only magic that can cure her. She also possess an unusual ability when she eats a dessert that is blessed with the Delicious Miracle, allowing her to transform into her Fairy Form in order to do purification magic. She is also the first person to unlock her Cake Fairy abilities. By the end of the series, she finally became Queen after her sense of taste returned.

Mocha Dennis (Chinese: 摩卡奇奇; pinyin: Mókǎ qí qí)

Voiced by: Liu Pei

A Male Mocha Cupcake Bear (Although his design is similar to a panda), Mocha Dennis is Bibi's first friend she met in the Cake Village and the cousin of Parfait Chacha. He cares a lot about his image and is a neat freak, usually does things in a leisurely way. He is also very strong willed though has a fear on bugs. Dennis is an expert patisserie and usually teaches Bibi how to bake properly. He rarely gets along with Bibi though he starts to develop some feelings to her. His star sign is Libra.

He first met Bibi at episode 1 alongside Parfait Chacha, though the meeting is very unexpected for the both of them. He is the second person to unlock his Cake Fairy abilities in episode 3. He is also in suspicion regarding Lyan's action until he found out his true motives.

Vanilla Ellie (Chinese: 香草爱丽; pinyin: Xiāngcǎo àilì)

Voiced by: Liao Chunyu

A Female Vanilla Mille Crepe Cake Sheep, Vanilla Ellie is Bibi's best friend in Cake Village. She is weakly willed, but she is also has a romantic personality and is a very nice girl. Ellie also loves reading the Horoscope and usually makes stuffed animals(they look bad but Bibi like them). Her star sign is Virgo.

Bibi met her at episode 3 and first thought she's a monster all thanks to Angel spreading false rumors about her. After a while, the two reconcile and got along well as they both became best friends. She is the fifth person to unlock her Cake Fairy abilities.

Blueberry Angel (Chinese: 蓝雀安琪; pinyin: Lán què ān qí)

Voiced by: Zhao Na

A Female Blueberry Cupcake Peacock, Blueberry Angel is the owner and manager of the pastry shop "Blue Berry". She is very proud, smart, always bossy regarding her work and also a bit of tomboyish due her attitude. Angel can be a bit cold-hearted and strict sometimes, usually has a huge ambition to become the best patisserie in the Sweetsheart Kingdom. She bakes cakes as a hobby, often some of them are blessed with Delicious Miracle, and treats Tia as her best friend. She also admires Lyne due to his baking skills until the reveal, and she is allergic to grass pollen. Her star sign is Capricorn.

She and Tia first met Bibi at Episode 1, mistaking her as a thief who wants to take away one of her decorated masterpieces. Angel also witnessed Bibi's fairy form for the first time, thinking she is a monster and became cold to her. She then became friends with her in Episode 4. Angel is the third person to unlock her Cake Fairy abilities.

Orange Tia (Chinese: 香巧蒂尔; pinyin: Xiāng qiǎo dì ěr)

Voiced by: Zu Liqing

A Female Orange Pudding Cake Deer Fawn, Orange Tia is Angel's close friend. She is very studious and usually more mature than the others, though she can have a very sharp tongue. She is also very calm and is very prepared on some situations and loves to read a lot of books, often being called a nerd sometimes. When she's stuck in a situation, she comes up with ideas. Tia is also a very good specialist on desserts and worked with Angel together in some of their creations. She owns an heirloom crown at her house and has a cousin named Niva, a very mischievous cat. Her star sign is Scorpio.

She and Angela first met Bibi at Episode 1, thinking she's a thief who wants to take away one of Angel's decorated masterpieces. Tia also witnessed Bibi's fairy form for the first time and knew that she has hidden abilities that she can discover. Tia is the seventh person to unlock her Cake Fairy abilities.

Parfait Chacha (Chinese: 芭菲茶茶; pinyin: Bā fēi cháchá)

Voiced by: Li Jing

A Female Matcha Cake Dog, Parfait Chacha is a noblewoman living in the Cake Village and also Mocha Dennis's cousin. She is a very playful girl who is very spoiled on things, especially her engagement with Dennis. She is also very haughty, ambitious and really motivated in which she will do everything to get Dennis's attention. She also hates Bibi due to the fact he focuses on her more than she does, but later on in the episode they became friend. Her star sign is Pisces.

She first met Bibi at episode 1 alongside Dennis, though the meeting between him and Bibi broke her heart. After Episode 34, her parents went bankrupt and decided to move away from Cake Village, leaving her behind. She now currently lives with Peach, working for a living. She is the sixth person to unlock her Cake Fairy abilities.

Strawberry Jessie (Chinese: 甜莓杰茜; pinyin: Tián méi jié qiàn)

Voiced by: Li Jing

A Female Strawberry Pudding Cake Hen Chick, Strawtberry Jessie is an herbalist living in the outskirts of Cake Village. She is very timid, shy and laid back, usually living alone before she met Bibi. Jessie is also dislikes both Durian and Lightning but has a liking on egg rolls. Her star sign is Aquarius.

Bibi first met her in Episode 5 and befriended her despite her being an outcast. Later on, she and her friends learned that she is the guardian of the Vanilla Valley, which is a place filled with various kinds of herbs. Her ancestors and family guarded the valley for centuries before she's given the task. She is the fourth person to unlock her Cake Fairy abilities.

Tiramisu Cavan (Chinese: 甜酒啡啡; pinyin: Tián jiǔ fēi fēi)

Voiced by: Zhao Ran

A Male Tiramisu Penguin, Tiramisu Cavan is Cake Village's genius gadgeteer. He is a very nice person who usually focuses on inventing things and likes to study mechanical things. He has bad eyesight and usually rely on his glasses to see. Cavan usually gets along with Tia but he is best friends with Peach. His star sign is Taurus.

Bibi and her friends first met him at Episode 14, who is building several theme park rides for everyone in Cake Village. His dream is to build a "Dream Paradise" for everyone. He is the ninth person to unlock his Cake Fairy abilities.

Honey Peach (Chinese: 蜜蜜桃子; pinyin: Mì mì táozi)

Voiced by: Li Jing

A Female Honey Cake Bee, Honey Peach is the village's resident honey expert. She is very workaholic, kind to people, and a tomboy, where she raises them to make honey. She is also very caring to small animals and hates to see her prized honey bees to get hurt. She is best friends with Tiramisu Cavan and shares a relationship together. Her star sign is Sagittarius.

Bibi first met her in Episode 16 and she and Cavan became best friends in Episode 17. She is the eight person to unlock her Cake Fairy abilities.

Ice Cream Sarah (Chinese: 冰淇爱丝; pinyin: Bīng qí ài sī)

Voiced by: Zu Liqing

A Female Ice Cream Cake Panda, Ice Cream Sara is a newcomer in the Cake Village who specializes on dried fruits. She is very full of enthusiasm and is optimistic and passionate on her work, especially her job but she can get a little homesick. On her first appearance, she makes friends with Benetta and later with the rest of the crew. Her star sign is Leo.

Bibi first met her in Episode 21 as she found out she arrived in Cake Village, mistaken it for her hometown: the Ice Cream Village. Lyne found out about this and used this to his schemes but failed. She is the last person to unlock her Cake Fairy abilities.

=== Side Characters ===
Chief Nicolas (Chinese: 大象村长; pinyin: Dà xiàng cūn zhǎng)

Voiced by: Zhao Ran

The Mayor of the Cake Village, he always appears through a hot air balloon to greet Bibi and her friends.

Orange Gugu (Chinese: 可丽果果; pinyin: Kě lì guǒ guǒ) and Taro Gigi (Chinese: 香芋芝芝; pinyin: Xiāng yù zhī zhī)

Voiced by: Zhao Ran (Gugu), Liao Chunyu (Gigi)

A pair of Female Cream Puff dogs, one is Orange and the other is Purple Yam flavored, Gugu and Gigi are Chacha's twin aides. They both behave nicely in front of Chacha though often the two argue sometimes. Usually, the two always agrees on Chacha's ideas and always go for them.

Cherry Dandan (Chinese: 樱桃丹丹; pinyin: Yīngtáo dān dān)

Voiced by: Deng Hong

A young female Cherry Cake squirrel, Cherry Dandan is the best friend of both Gugu and Gigi. She usually tags along both of them and likes to play with the two sisters.

Aunt Anna (Chinese: 安娜阿姨; pinyin: Ānnà āyí)

Voiced by: Liao Chunyu

A Female Orange Herbal tea dog, she is Parfait Chacha's mother. She is very well dressed, and she and her husband tend to be very anxious for their daughter's well-being, but especially her.

Uncle Jeff (Chinese: 杰夫叔叔; pinyin: Jié fū shūshu)

Voiced by: Liu Pei

A male dog and Parfait ChaCha's father.

Niva (Chinese: 云妮娜; pinyin: Yún nī nà)

Voiced by: Zhao Na

A Female Strawberry cat, Niva is Tia's cousin. She is very mischievous thought sometimes well behaved.

=== Antagonists ===
Lyan (Chinese: 莱恩; pinyin: Lái'ēn)

Voiced by: Zhao Ran

A male Bagel lion, Lyan is Mousse Bibi's royal adviser and the series's main antagonist. He is nice and very supportive, however he has a very dark and evil side and will do anything to eradicate the Princess. On his stay in the Cake Village, he wears his special disguise in order for others not to recognize him. His star sign is Aries.

He is usually jealous when he first heard Bibi is going to ascend to the throne and wants it for himself. Because of this, he made a cake that would make her suffer Ageusia and the one telling her to search for the Delicious Miracle for his personal goal. However, in the finale, he finally changed his ways after Bibi talked to him.

== Broadcast ==
The series was first broadcast on the Chinese Satellite channel JiaJia Kids from November 10, 2012 to December 16, 2012. The series was later aired on the Chinese television channel Youman Cartoon Satellite TV on November 12, 2012 every Weekday at 07:40 AM. It was again rebroadcast from April 25 to May 2, 2016

It was later broadcast in Taiwan via MOMO Kids on December 26, 2013.

=== Episode List ===
| No. | Title | Original release date |
|---|---|---|
| 1 | "The Princess who Left Home"; Transliteration: "Lí jiā chūzǒu de gōngzhǔ" (Chinese: 离家出走的公主) | November 10, 2012 |
| 2 | "The Big Bake-off"; Transliteration: "Dàngāo dà zuòzhàn" (Chinese: 蛋糕大作战) | November 11, 2012 |
| 3 | "A New Home"; Transliteration: "Bān jìn xīnjiā" (Chinese: 搬进新家) | November 12, 2012 |
| 4 | "From Enemies to Friends"; Transliteration: "Huà dí wéi yǒu" (Chinese: 化敌为友) | November 13, 2012 |
| 5 | "A Mysterious Girl"; Transliteration: "Shénmì nǚhái" (Chinese: 神秘女孩) | November 14, 2012 |
| 6 | "Vanilla Valley"; Transliteration: "Xiāngcǎo shāngǔ" (Chinese: 香草山谷) | November 15, 2012 |
| 7 | "Ellie's Troubles"; Transliteration: "Xiāngcǎo àilì de fánnǎo" (Chinese: 香草爱丽的烦恼) | November 16, 2012 |
| 8 | "Trouble at Sea"; Transliteration: "Hǎishàng jīnghún" (Chinese: 海上惊魂) | November 17, 2012 |
| 9 | "Jessie and the Fireflies"; Transliteration: "Tián méi jié xī yǔ yínghuǒchóng" (Chinese: 甜莓杰西与萤火虫) | November 18, 2012 |
| 10 | "Cousin's Coming"; Transliteration: "Biǎomèi jiàdào" (Chinese: 表妹驾到) | November 19, 2012 |
| 11 | "Happy Farm"; Transliteration: "Kāixīn mùchǎng" (Chinese: 开心牧场) | November 20, 2012 |
| 12 | "Diet Battle"; Transliteration: "Jiǎnféi dà zuòzhàn" (Chinese: 减肥大作战) | November 21, 2012 |
| 13 | "The Mischievous Blackbird"; Transliteration: "Chuǎnghuò de bāgē" (Chinese: 闯祸的八哥) | November 22, 2012 |
| 14 | "Dream Park"; Transliteration: "Mèngxiǎng lèyuán" (Chinese: 梦想乐园) | November 23, 2012 |
| 15 | "Family Treasure"; Transliteration: "Chuán jiā zhī bǎo" (Chinese: 传家之宝) | November 24, 2012 |
| 16 | "The Disappearing Bees"; Transliteration: "Mìfēng shīzōng shìjiàn" (Chinese: 蜜蜂失踪事件) | November 25, 2012 |
| 17 | "Incoming Storm"; Transliteration: "Táifēng lái xí" (Chinese: 台风来袭) | November 26, 2012 |
| 18 | "Holiday Legends"; Transliteration: "Shèngdàn chuánshuō" (Chinese: 圣诞传说) | November 27, 2012 |
| 19 | "The Rainbow Cake"; Transliteration: "Qīsè dàngāo" (Chinese: 七色蛋糕) | November 28, 2011 |
| 20 | "A Jam Overload"; Transliteration: "Dōu shì guǒjiàng rě de huò" (Chinese: 都是果酱惹的祸) | November 29, 2012 |
| 21 | "Friendly Deceptions"; Transliteration: "Péngyǒu de qīpiàn" (Chinese: 朋友的欺骗) | November 30, 2012 |
| 22 | "Escaping the Fruit Tribe"; Transliteration: "Shuǐguǒ bùluò dà táowáng" (Chinese: 水果部落大逃亡) | December 1, 2012 |
| 23 | "Lucky Fortune"; Transliteration: "Xìngyùn zhānbǔ" (Chinese: 幸运占卜) | December 2, 2012 |
| 24 | "The Secret Recipe Revealed"; Transliteration: "Mìfāng xiàn shēn" (Chinese: 秘方现身) | December 3, 2012 |
| 25 | "The Mischievous Kid"; Transliteration: "Fǎn dòu xiǎo mó xīng" (Chinese: 反斗小魔星) | December 4, 2012 |
| 26 | "Birthday Troubles"; Transliteration: "Shēngrì fēngbō" (Chinese: 生日风波) | December 4, 2012 |
| 27 | "Dennis's Memory Lost"; Transliteration: "Mókǎ qí qí shīyì" (Chinese: 摩卡奇奇失忆) | December 5, 2012 |
| 28 | "The Creme Puff Twins' Argument"; Transliteration: "Shuāngbāotāi chǎojiàle" (Chinese: 双胞胎吵架了) | December 6, 2012 |
| 29 | "True Friends"; Transliteration: "Zhòngyào de péngyǒu" (Chinese: 重要的朋友) | December 7, 2012 |
| 30 | "Here Comes Lyan"; Transliteration: "Lái'ēn dēngchǎng" (Chinese: 莱恩登场) | December 8, 2012 |
| 31 | "Lyan's Comical Life"; Transliteration: "Lái'ēn de xǐjù shēnghuó" (Chinese: 莱恩的喜剧生活) | December 9, 2012 |
| 32 | "Tour Ambassador"; Transliteration: "Lǚyóu dàshǐ xuǎnbásài" (Chinese: 旅游大使选拔赛) | December 10, 2012 |
| 33 | "The Missing Pie"; Transliteration: "Shéi dòngle wǒ de xiàn bǐng" (Chinese: 谁动了我的馅饼) | December 11, 2012 |
| 34 | "Chacha's Working Life"; Transliteration: "Cháchá gōngzhǔ de dǎgōng shēnghuó" (Chinese: 茶茶公主的打工生活) | December 12, 2012 |
| 35 | "Magical Hypnonsis"; Transliteration: "Shénqí de cuīmián shù" (Chinese: 神奇的催眠术) | December 13, 2012 |
| 36 | "The Time Capsule"; Transliteration: "Shíguāng bǎo hé" (Chinese: 时光宝盒) | December 14, 2012 |
| 37 | "The Upcoming Disaster"; Transliteration: "Zāinàn jiànglín" (Chinese: 灾难降临) | December 15, 2012 |
| 38 | "Light of Hope"; Transliteration: "Xīwàng zhī guāng" (Chinese: 希望之光) | December 16, 2012 |
| 39 | "The Sweets Fairy Cake"; Transliteration: "Huàn biàn tiánxīn dàngāo" (Chinese: 幻变甜心蛋糕) | December 15, 2012 |
| 40 | "The Last Delicious Miracle"; Transliteration: "Zuìhòu dì měiwèi qíjì" (Chinese: 最后的美味奇迹) | December 16, 2012 |

== See also ==
- Balala the Fairies - Another Magical Girl franchise created by Auldey.
- Zoobles
