= Zoobles! Spring to Life! =

2011 video game

- North American cover art
- Developer: Now Production
- Publisher: Activision
- Director: Tsubasa Yoshida
- Producers: Robert Conkey; Tatsuo Isuko; Eiji Ohnobu (executive producer)
- Designers: Asami Notake; Yusuke Inatomi
- Composers: Momo Michishita; Takayuki Saito; Masanori Otsuka; Etsuko Ichikawa
- Platform: Nintendo DS
- Release: NA: November 1, 2011; EU: November 6, 2011
- Genres: Simulation; Role-playing game Puzzle
- Mode: Single-player

Zoobles! Spring to Life! is a pet simulation role-playing game based on the Zoobles! toyline by Spin Master. Developed by Japanese game developer Now Production and published by Activision, the game was released on the Nintendo DS in November 2011 in United States and Europe.

== Gameplay ==
Zoobles! Spring to Life! is a simulation role-playing game with a few puzzle elements. The player starts by choosing the region they must play first. There are 6 regions to choose, though the other 5 regions must be unlocked by completing the first region, Petagonia. After choosing said region, the player must choose one of the three zoobles to take control of and after choosing said Zooble, the game begins.

Players must watch over the Zooble's hunger, playfulness and cleanness. For its hunger, the player must feed it with either fruits which can be obtained from trees or vegetables that the player grows in its garden. For its activeness, the player must make the Zooble participate in some minigames to increase its activity meter and for its cleanness, the player's Zooble must take a bath once a day. The game also has a Day/Night Cycle system, if when the player's Zooble is tired, it must return to its Happitat and put it to sleep.

Interacting with the player's Zooble, meeting other Zoobles, or playing minigames lets it earn Zoints, which can unlock more Zoobles in the game, new regions, a spring and a slide for the player's Zooble to play with. Players can collect items, which can unlock furniture for the player to decorate its Happitat. Also, when the player gives a certain fruit or vegetable to the Zooble the player befriends to, the player will receive recipe items necessary for the baking minigame. Another feature in the game is the Wikizoob, where it tracks the information of the Zooble the player unlocked in the game.

== Music ==
The game's music is done by SOUND AMS, who also did the music for New LovePlus. Each of the music tracks were composed by Momo Michishita, Takayuki Saito, Masanori Otsuka and Etsuko Ichikawa.
