= Jang Geum's Dream =

South Korean animated television series

- Hangul: 장금이의 꿈
- RR: Janggeumiui kkum
- MR: Changgŭmiŭi kkum
- Starring: Chung Misook
- Country of origin: South Korea
- No. of episodes: 52 (List of episodes)

Production
- Running time: 30 min.

Original release
- Network: MBC
- Release: October 29, 2005 – September 19, 2007

Jang Geum's Dream (Korean: 장금이의 꿈) is a South Korean animation. It is a production by Munhwa Broadcasting Corporation. The animation was done by Sonokong and Heewon Entertainment. The animation centers on Jang Geum (장금), who enters the Royal Kitchen as an apprentice court lady. The show is a spinoff from MBC's mega-hit historical drama Dae Jang Geum. The animation program has been sold to Tooniverse, resulting in the broadcast of a second series in 2007.

It was based on the popularity of MBC drama Daejanggeum, which aired from 2003 to 2004. Based on the time of thought of Jang Geum, the main character of the original drama "Jewel in the Palace", the whole frame is based on the original story of Jang Geum, Yeon-saeng, Geumyeong, Min Jeong-ho, and so on, adding original characters that do not appear in the drama.

== Plot ==
=== Season 1 ===
The story is spun off of the Korean historical drama Dae Jang Geum, though it is aimed for a younger audience. The plot is basically the same: a girl named Jang Geum with a dream of becoming a palace chef (의녀). However, the complex line of corruption and sometimes even murder present in Dae Jang Geum does not appear in Jang Geum's Dream. Jang Geum's Mother is revealed to have passed in Season 2. The plot is kept light throughout with quite a bit of comedy. Through the story, Jang Geum enters the palace and amazes people with her skills and willingness to learn.

However, after receiving much approval from the royals and upper sang goong, she abandons her thought of cooking to see people's smiles and turns to winning and impressing. Lady Han, a sang goong that has always watched over her, warns her of the path she is taking but Jang Geum continues to strive to impress. Finally she is found out by the sang goongs after stealing a sacred book and thrown out of the palace with her friends, Yeon Shan and Chang Yi. Jang Geum travels with her friends and slowly realizes the mistakes she made and turns back to the train of thought she once had. She realizes that she had forgotten the importance of natural flavor. At the end of this series, Jang Geum wins a competition by preparing food that is beneficial to each individual eating it and is allowed back into the palace. However, she demotes herself to the lowest palace maid because she wants to start over. The story continues with Jang Geum's Dream Season 2 in 2007.

=== Season 2 ===
Jungjeon, the new hostess of the palace, enters, and Suratgan is also busy. The Choi family gains the trust of the new middle warlord, and moves into action quickly to secure the top spot in Suratgan.

On the other hand, strange events take place around Jang Geum-i and her party, and the appearance of a new character, Yoon-hwan.

Meanwhile, Jang Geum-i is accused of leaking Buwon-gun's illness and is in danger of being kicked out of the palace. Han Sang-gung risked her life to save Jang Geum-i and set out to find a secret to curing Buwon-gun's illness, and the journey of Jang Geum-i and her companions begins.

== Characters ==
- Seo Jang-geum
  - main protagonist of story. 13 years old. Although she lost her parents early when she was young and grew up under her adoptive parents, Kang Deok-gu, she is always bright and brave enough not to be considered an orphan. Her dream is people all over the world eating delicious food she made and being happy. She is curious, proud, and intelligent, but sometimes she is so active that she is reckless. She is hard working with her own strength.
- Lee Yeon-saeng
- Lee Chang-yi
- Choi Geum-young

== Cast ==
=== Korean version ===
- Chung Misook as Seo Jang-geum
- Ryu Seung-kon as Min Jeong-ho
- Bak Seon-yeong as Choi Geum-yeong and Han Sang-goong
- Kim Youngsun as Jang Soo-ro
- Bak So-ra as Lee Yeon-saeng
- Rhee Seon-joo as Lee Chang-hee and Kang Dong-hee
- Kim Seo-yeong as Yoon Yeong-ro and Deok Goo-cheo
- Chweh Seok-pil as Kang Deok-goo and Beori Jagaek
- Yoon Seong-hye as Choi Sang-goong
- Choi Han as Jung Jong
- Song Joon-seok as Eori Jagaek and Yun Hwan

== Soundtrack ==
The soundtrack was released on CD. It featured some traditional Korean songs like Kkobang Kkobang. Popular artists like 7Princess and Lee Seung-hwan contributed as well.

== See also ==
- Dae Jang Geum
- aeni
