= Element Hunters =

Japanese-South Korean television series

- Japanese cover of the first DVD volume. From left to right, Chiara Ferina, Ren Karas and Homi Nandie.

エレメントハンター (Eremento Hantā)
- Anime television series
- Directed by: Yoshiaki Okumura; Hong Hun-pyo
- Produced by: Kim Sun-tae; Yasuo Kageyama
- Written by: Naruhisa Arakawa
- Music by: Toshihiko Sahashi
- Studio: Heewon Entertainment (Animation); NHK Enterprises (Production)
- Original network: NHK Educational TV (Japan); KBS1, Tooniverse (South Korea)
- Original run: July 4, 2009 – March 27, 2010 (Japan); November 14, 2009 – August 28, 2010 (South Korea)
- Episodes: 39
- Manga
- Written by: Yuuki Nakashima
- Published by: Shueisha
- Magazine: V Jump
- Original run: July 2009 – August 2010
- Volumes: 2
- Video game
- Developer: Climax Entertainment
- Publisher: Bandai Namco Games (Note: Released under the Bandai brand name.)
- Genre: Role-playing
- Platform: Nintendo DS
- Released: JP: October 22, 2009; KR: December 18, 2009

Element Hunters (エレメントハンター, Eremento Hantā; Korean: 엘리먼트 헌터; RR: Elimeonteu Heonteo) is a 2009 Japanese-South Korean anime science-fiction adventure television series. It aims to generate more awareness in chemistry and other sciences. The series is set in the year 2029. A manga series began at the same time, and has continued even after the anime ended in 2010, and the manga still continues until August 2010. Bandai Namco has released a Nintendo DS game for Element Hunters, it was released on October 22, 2009, in Japan and on December 18, 2009, in South Korea. The game was developed by the now defunct Climax Entertainment. The franchise is closing on officials websites in this time.

== Synopsis ==
In 2029, chemical elements such as oxygen, carbon, gold, molybdenum, and cobalt were continually disappearing from Earth. These disappearing elements ultimately disrupted the environment and led to the destruction of various homes, cities, and even entire countries. Researchers discovered that the vanishing elements drained into a planet called Nega Earth, located in another dimension. In 2089, Element dematerialization was occurring rapidly; thus, to save Earth, three special pre-teens picked by the space colony government formed the Element Hunters. Their job was to transport themselves to Nega-Earth to battle monsters called QEXes and retrieve lost elements. However, out of their own concerns, Ren, Chiara, and Homi, three average middle school students from Earth, banded together to also become Element Hunters. With the help of Professor Aimee Carr and Juno, they are able to help save their own planet.

== Characters ==
=== Earth Team ===
Ren Karas (レン・カラス, Ren Karasu; Korean: 렌 카라스; RR: Len Kalaseu)
Voiced by: Yūtarō Honjō (Japan)
Voiced by: Misuk Jeong (Korea)
Birth date: October 9th
Age: 12
An energetic middle-schooler who always looks for exciting adventures. He lacks the patience for learning and prefers to meet challenges head on; however, once he became an Element Hunter, Ren took the time to study chemistry in order to better eliminate QEXes. Ren tends to act before thinking a lot; however, his ingenuity has helped his team win various battles. His parents own a restaurant, and his grandfather had close ties to Professor Aimee Carr. Even though he was elected vice-chairman to help Chiara, he tends to argue with her a lot.
Chiara Ferina (キアラ・フィリーナ, Kiara Firīna; Korean: 키아라 피리나; RR: Kiala Pilina)
Voiced by: Atsuko Enomoto (Japan)
Voiced by: Jiyeon Seo (Korea)
Birth date: April 8th
Age: 12
A serious, intelligent, young girl who is best friends with Ren and Homi. Her motto is, "I am the judge and the jury". She transferred to the same town Ren lived in three years prior to the storyline, and because of her dedication, hard work, and independence, she plowed her way up to class chairman. Chiara and Ren both met Homi while helping each other saving Sena, a stray dog, during an episode of element dematerialization. She lives with her father, who is rather laid-back, and usually fulfills household duties. Even though her parents do not live together (but are not divorced), her mother still visits both Chiara and her father and keep in touch. Chiara considers herself the leader of the Earth Team, frequently putting her at odds with Ren. She eventually shows feelings for Rodney.
Homi Nandie (ホミ・ナンディ, Homi Nandi; Korean: 호미 난디; RR: Homi Nandi)
Voiced by: Hōko Kuwashima (Japan)
Voiced by: Insil Oh (Korea)
Birth date: April 10th
Age: 11
A bookworm who, up until he meet Ren and Chiara, has always been alone. Though he is not physically healthy due to his cardiac disease, Homi is the smartest team member out of the Element Hunters from Earth and often acts as the team's strategist. After saving Sena, his dog, he befriends Ren and Chiara. He was actually adopted while he was younger by an elderly couple whom he now calls his grandparents. When Homi was little, he used to catch butterflies with his grandfather before he died. Now, he lives with his grandmother. After meeting Hannah, he finds out that both of them were man-made as a part of a government project. He considers Hannah to be his biological sister.
Ally Connolly (アリー・コナリー, Arī Konarī; Korean: 아리 코넬리; RR: Ali Konelli)
Voiced by: Sanae Kobayashi (Japan)
Voiced by: Seon Lee (Korea)
The former leader of the Colony team. She is from Egypt. Ally sent the Earth Team Booster Wear after acknowledging them as rivals in order to help them defeat more QEXes. During her time as captain of Element Hunters at the colony, she started questioning element dematerialization and the motives of the government. Soon afterwards, a terrible accident happened on Nega Earth that led everyone to believe she was dead. However, she actually survived and left the Element Hunters team in order to join Professor Aimee Carr on Earth. Chiara bought her clothes as a welcoming present shortly after Ally arrived on Earth. She is terrible at cooking and has made Ren faint from eating her food. Ally considers Juno to be her best friend.
Professor Aimee Carr (エイミー・カー博士, Eimī Kā Hakase; Korean: 에이미 카 박사; RR: Eimi Ka Baksa)
Voiced by: Ako Mayama (Japan)
Voiced by: Sora Yun (Korea)
Before her death, Professor Carr had her conscious preserved digitally in order to continue existing as an information-based hologram. She found and convinced Ren (the only person to call her as Old Lady, even if she hates this nickname), Chiara, and Homi to become the Element Hunters from Earth and guides them through their path to saving their planet. Professor Carr becomes annoyed whenever Ren calls her old; she subsequently electrocutes him afterwards. When Professor Carr was five years old, she lost her parents and shouted to the world, "I want this world to die", which managed to awaken creatures in the 11th dimension and thus caused the elements' disappearance in the first place.
Juno (ユノ, Yuno; Korean: 유노; RR: Yuno)
Voiced by: Sara Nakayama (Japan)
Voiced by: Jiyun Park (Korea)
An android who serves as the assistant of Carr. She alerts the Earth Team when the presence of a QEX is detected. Juno often works on improving her human-like behaviors with them. Despite being an android, she dreams and cries. Later in the anime, when all of the Element Hunters are trapped on Nega Earth, Juno is melted along a vast amount of iron so she can appear in Nega Earth and tell the children how to get back home. She is the reason why the Earth Team is able to talk to Shape-Shifters on Nega Earth. At the end of the final episode she is seen smiling as she stands on top of a cliff watching the kids.

=== Colony Team ===
The team made up of children who have the ability to go to "Nega Earth". They are taken from Earth early in their lives and trained in the Space Colony to become Element Hunters.

Ally Connolly (アリー・コナリー, Arī Konarī; Korean: 아리 코넬리; RR: Ali Konelli)
Voiced by: Sanae Kobayashi (Japan)
Voiced by: Seon Lee (Korea)
The former leader of the Colony team. She is from Egypt. Ally sent the Earth Team Booster Wear after acknowledging them as rivals in order to help them defeat more QEXes. During her time as captain of Element Hunters at the colony, she started questioning element dematerialization and the motives of the government. Soon afterwards, a terrible accident happened on Nega Earth that led everyone to believe she was dead. However, she actually survived and left the Element Hunters team in order to join Professor Aimee Carr on Earth. Chiara bought her clothes as a welcoming present shortly after Ally arrived on Earth. She is terrible at cooking and has made Ren faint from eating her food. Ally considers Juno to be her best friend.
Rodney Ford (ロドニー・フォード, Rodonī Fōdo; Korean: 로드니 포드; RR: Rodeuni Podeu)
Voiced by: Nozomu Sasaki (Japan)
Voiced by: Seokjeong Yang (Korea)
A serious, handsome, and frequently elitist member of the colony team. He comes from a rich political family, though he is not proud of his connections. Though his father pressures him to leave Element Hunters, Rodney chooses not to and tries to achieve his goals in life without the help of his father. He is upset that Hannah was appointed as their leader after Ally left and tends not trust her. Rodney has strong feelings for Chiara and deeply cares for her. He often opposes Chiara embarking on any type of dangerous activity for fear of her getting hurt.
Tom Benson (トム・ベンソン, Tomu Benson; Korean: 톰 벤슨; RR: Tom Benseun)
Voiced by: Akio Suyama (Japan)
Voiced by: Dohyeong Nam (Korea)
An aloof member of the colony team who has a quirky sense of humor. Tom was quicker to accept the Earth team among his team members. On Nega-Earth, he collected gems and named them in his spare time. Tom is obsessed with Hannah and was thrilled with Chiara gave him her signed autograph. Though Hannah always treated him with ill manners, he continually tries to befriend her. He worked in the research department at the Space Colony and developed transportation vehicles for use on Nega-Earth.
Hannah Weber (ハンナ・ウェーバー, Hanna Wēbā; Korean: 한나 웨버; RR: Hanna Webeo)
Voiced by: Rie Yamaguchi (Japan)
Voiced by: Jeongmi Bae (Korea)
The newly appointed leader of the Colony team, after Ally left. She is a well-known celebrity and is the face of Mirai Orange. Her catchphrase is, "Smile with Mirai Orange". She is actually rather selfish and enjoys being by herself. Though she highly excelled in her childhood, she was constantly picked on because everybody back then knew that Hannah was created by the government as a tool. She has a foster father who often psychologically manipulated her in order to help him try and destroy Earth so that the colony could move to Mars instead. After she realized that she and Homi have the same shape for ears, they both discover that they are siblings.

=== Others ===
Dan Karas (ダン・カラス, Dan Karasu; Korean: 댄 카라스; RR: Daen Karaseu)
Voiced by: Rikiya Koyama (Japan)
Ren's father and the owner of the family-run restaurant, Dan Dan. After a head on encounter with elemental deterioration, he falls down a hole and breaks both his legs.
Ann Karas (アン・カラス, An Karasu; Korean: 앤 카라스; RR: Aen Karaseu)
Voiced by: Akiko Hiramatsu (Japan)
Ren's mother. She believes that Ren and Chiara have a mutual attraction towards each other, though they strongly deny it. Ren's biggest fear is his own mother.
Roberto Ferina (ロベルト・フィリーナ, Roberuto Firīna; Korean: 로베르토 피리나; RR: Robereuto Pirina)
Voiced by: Hiroaki Hirata (Japan)
Chiara's dad. He is a carefree man, capable of laughing after losing his job. He shows strong moral courage and is never ashamed of whatever he loves to do. He is frequently seen watching TV episodes of "Element Five" --a TV show in which his wife plays the leading role. He gives advice to Chiara about love; he told her that though he argues with his wife, they still care for each other. His advice helped Chiara accept Rodney's confession.
Naomi Ferina (奈緒美・フィリーナ, Naomi Firīna; Korean: 나오미 피리나; RR: Naomi Pirina)
Chiara's mother. She takes the lead role in a TV show called "Element Five", a Super Sentai series. She cares deeply for Chiara and looks kindly upon her husband. Despite being separated, they still love each other. Later, she and Hannah star in a new movie together.
Director Kawashima (川島 長官, Kawashima Chōkan)
Voiced by: Ryusuke Obayashi (Japan)
Hannah's foster father. He acts against the Colony's interests of saving the Earth.

== Episodes ==
#	Title	Written by	Original air date	Korean air date
1	To a Different World	Naruhisa Arakawa	July 4, 2009	November 14, 2009
2	Divide the unexpected!	Naruhisa Arakawa	July 11, 2009	November 21, 2009
3	Their recrystallization me!	Naruhisa Arakawa	July 18, 2009	November 28, 2009
4	Explosion of burning love!	Kei Murayama	July 25, 2009	December 5, 2009
5	Boiling Chiara!	Michiko Ito	August 1, 2009	December 12, 2009
6	Kokoro no positive reaction	Michiko Ito	August 8, 2009	December 19, 2009
7	Storage in the dark matter (dark matter)	Takao Nakano	August 22, 2009	December 26, 2009
8	Thermal conductivity Pride!	Kei Murayama	August 29, 2009	January 2, 2010
9	Prepared for isolation	Michiko Ito	September 5, 2009	January 9, 2010
10	October: One Man Superfluid Universe!	Hiro Masaki	September 12, 2009	January 16, 2010
11	Directive Join Kizuna!	Kei Murayama	September 19, 2009	January 23, 2010
12	Curiosity About the Collapse	Takao Nakano	September 26, 2009	January 30, 2010
13	Call Singularity Destruction	Kei Murayama	October 3, 2009	February 6, 2010
14	Freefall of fate	Naruhisa Arakawa	October 10, 2009	February 20, 2010
15	Fire in the Heart!	Naruhisa Arakawa	October 17, 2009	February 27, 2010
16	Low pressure Leader	Sotaro Hayashi	October 24, 2009	March 6, 2010
17	The Day we Closely Saw Symbiosis	Takao Nakano	October 31, 2009	March 13, 2010
18	Sunset on the Third Planet	Michiko Ito	November 7, 2009	March 20, 2010
19	The Autonomous Mineral is Here!	Hiro Masaki	November 14, 2009	March 27, 2010
20	Mysterious Mimicry Object	Kei Murayama	November 21, 2009	April 3, 2010
21	Unknown Threat! Metallic Lifeform	Sotaro Hayashi	November 29, 2009	April 10, 2010
22	The Manipulated Atomic Bonding	Kei Murayama	December 6, 2009	May 1, 2010
23	Titanium Gone! Dreams, Don't Disappear	Takao Nakano	December 13, 2009	May 8, 2010
24	The Accelerating Elemental Dematerialization	Naruhisa Arakawa	December 20, 2009	May 15, 2010
25	First Contact	Hiro Masaki	December 27, 2009	May 22, 2010
26	Deep Memory Diver	Michiko Ito	January 10, 2010	May 29, 2010
27	A Gift From the External Braneworld	Hiro Masaki	January 17, 2010	June 5, 2010
28	The Shapeshifting Magmatic Lifeform	Sotaro Hayashi	January 24, 2010	June 12, 2010
29	The Turning Point to Resolution	Kei Murayama	January 31, 2010	June 19, 2010
30	A Sprite's Blizzard	Takao Nakano	February 7, 2010	June 26, 2010
31	The Unforgivable Experiment Results	Michiko Ito	February 14, 2010	July 3, 2010
32	Into the Mantle! The Subsurface Challenge	Hiro Masaki	February 21, 2010	July 10, 2010
33	Impossible Return-The Future with no Option	Naruhisa Arakawa	February 28, 2010	July 17, 2010
34	Carr's Decision! The Advent Upon Colony	Naruhisa Arakawa	March 7, 2010	July 24, 2010
35	An Android's Dream	Naruhisa Arakawa	March 14, 2010	July 31, 2010
36	A Miracle Beyond Time and Space	Michiko Ito	March 20, 2010	August 7, 2010
37	Tomorrow, to the Eleventh Dimension!	Naruhisa Arakawa	March 20, 2010	August 14, 2010
38	The Information Energy of Destruction	Takao Nakano	March 27, 2010	August 21, 2010
39	The Qualia Towards The Future	Naruhisa Arakawa	March 27, 2010	August 28, 2010

== Staff ==
- Original Story by Kazunori Ito
- Directed by Yoshiaki Okumura, Hong Hun-pyo
- Writer: Naruhisa Arakawa
- Character Design by Daigo Okumura
- SF setting by Ryuichi Kaneko
- Music by Toshihiko Sahashi
- Science supervisor: Masato Murakami
- Element Design by Apuo Reino
- Art Direction by Bong Ha Gwon (credited as Bong Ha-gwon), Nobuto Sakamoto
- Cinematography by Na Se Yun (credited as Na Se-yeon)
- Editing by Takeshi Seyama
- Sound Direction by Toru Nakano
- Music Produced by Keiichi Nozaki
- Animation Producer: Shin Ju-hee
- Producers: Yasuo Kageyama, Kim Sun-tae
- Executive Producer: Akemi Sugayama
- Spanish Distributor: Arait Multimedia S.A.
- Animation by NHK Enterprises (credited as NHK Enterprise), Heewon Entertainment
- ©2009 Elementhunters Production Committee

== Music ==
- Opening Theme: "First Pain" by Chiaki Ishikawa (Korean Version sung by Seondeok Choi)
- Ending Theme: "H-He-Li-Be ~The magical spell~"" by Kakkii and Ash Potato (Korean Version sung by Mijin Kim, Namkyu Won, Taewook Lee and Kyoungwon Ju)
