= Heewon Entertainment =

South Korean entertainment company

Heewon Entertainment Co, Ltd. (Korean: ㈜희원엔터테인먼트) is a South Korean toy, animation and entertainment company. headquartered in Guro-Dong Guro-Gu Seoul, Korea. established in 1994. It is a Korean animation and Japanese animation producer and also produces anime review entertainment, Korea; as well as a Korean-language version of Battle Beadman, Fire Beadman and Beyblade animation, and a called Jang Geum's Dream. It used to other animation, and featured storylines inappropriate for Chokomi, though not animated entertainment (see Anime).

Heewon's animates were confined to South Korea until a contract with based Korean animation group. The contract allowed animation works. to distribute Fire Beadman, Battle Beadman and Jang Geum's Dream in Korea. who hold a 50% stake in Heewon. A final contract in 2000, signed with BROCCOLI, a Japanese company, meant that Di Gi Cahrat was now available in animated sponsorship regions.

It is jointly owned by world animation helpers Sonokong, Munhwa Broadcasting Corporation, KBS, SBS, BROCCOLI.

== Group companies ==
- Heewon Art Flower
- Heewon's Beyblades

== Productions ==
=== Made in Korea ===
- Jang Geum's Dream (MBC)
- Fire Beadman (KBS)
- Juka Juka
- The Sweet Little Comi (MBC)
- Turning Mecard (KBS)
- Viva Music
- Road To Friendship (MBC)
- Dragon Rising (MBC)
- Animal Academy (MBC)
- Legendary Detective (Netflix)
- Choro The Pro Fighter (Netflix)

=== Assistant production ===
- Di Gi Charat (BROCCOLI, Japan)
- Littlest Pet Shop (Sunbow Productions, USA)
- B-Daman (Magicverse, Japan)
- Law of Sun (Tack, Japan)
- Full Moon (Studio Deen, Japan)
- Beyblade (SBS)
- Battle Beadman (KBS, Japan)
- Element Hunters (NHK Enterprises, Japan)

== See also ==
- Sonokong
- Contemporary culture of South Korea
- Korean animation
- List of South Korean companies
