= Chōsoku Henkei Gyrozetter =

Japanese media franchise

- Cover of the first manga volume

超速変形ジャイロゼッター
- Genre: Mecha science fiction
- Video game
- Developer: Square Enix
- Genre: Digital Card RPG/Racing
- Engine: Unreal Engine 3
- Platform: Arcade
- Released: 31 May 2012
- Video game
- Developer: Square Enix
- Genre: Digital Card RPG/Racing
- Engine: Unreal Engine 3
- Platform: Nintendo 3DS
- Released: 13 June 2013
- Manga
- Written by: Teruaki Mizuno
- Published by: Shueisha
- Imprint: Jump Comics
- Magazine: Saikyō Jump
- Original run: October 2012 – April 2014
- Volumes: 7
- Anime television series
- Directed by: Shinji Takamatsu (chief); Kunihiro Mori
- Written by: Dai Satō; Story Riders
- Music by: Naoki Satō
- Studio: A-1 Pictures
- Original network: TXN (TV Tokyo), AT-X
- English network: SEA: Animax Asia
- Original run: 2 October 2012 – 24 September 2013
- Episodes: 51
- icon

Chōsoku Henkei Gyrozetter (超速変形ジャイロゼッター, Chōsoku Henkei Jairozetta; Super High-Speed Transforming Gyrozetter) is a media franchise by Square Enix which includes a series of arcade digital collectible card games, a Nintendo 3DS game, a manga series, an anime television series, and an action figure line. Later, Animax Asia aired the anime series from April 19, 2017.

== Plot ==
In 21st century Japan, vehicles with artificial intelligence for increased safety, known as A.I. Cars, have revolutionized the automotive industry. Special schools teaching children to drive A.I. Cars have been established. One day, Kakeru Todoroki, a fifth grader of Arcadia Academy, is summoned by the school principal and given an A.I. Car with which to save humanity. The car, however, is actually also a transforming robot known as Gyrozetter. When Xenon, an evil organization bent on world domination, wreak havoc across New Yokohama City, Kakeru must gather the other "chosen drivers" foretold on the artifact known as the "Rosettagraph", and stop Xenon's evil plans.

== Characters ==
=== Arcadia Academy ===
Kakeru Todoroki (轟駆流, Todoroki Kakeru)
Voiced by: Marina Inoue

The main protagonist of the series, and the first of the six chosen drivers selected by Arcadia. A young carefree boy who was very polite, and never forgets to smile and bow at whoever he met, although he regularly displayed recklessness that almost got him into trouble. However, whenever he sees someone in danger, he would not think twice before rushing to help, but when his friends were in deep danger, or if they were hurt in front of him, Kakeru sets his outgoing personality aside and unleashes his repressed hatred at his enemies. He usually used the word depressingly as an adjective, much to Rinne's dismay. His Gyrozetter, Raibird, uses a short sword, called "Thunderclap Blade", to deliver strikes at his enemies, and usually uses attacks based on Japanese wrestling moves, such as Lightning Slash, a diving attack. He has three Final Burst in the series

Souta Gunji (軍司ソウタ, Gunji Souta) Eraser01 (イレイザー01, iraeizar01)
Voiced by: Mutsumi Tamura
Rinne Inaba (稲葉りんね, Inaba Rinne)
Voiced by: Yuka Iguchi
Shunsuke Hayami (速水俊介, Hayami Shunsuke)
Voiced by: Yoshitsugu Matsuoka
Michinori Hane (羽根ミチノリ, Hane Michinori)
Voiced by: Akio Suyama
Satori Miwa (美輪サトリ, Miwa Satori)
Voiced by: Arisa Kiyoto
Yutaka Hisashi (久石 豊, Hisashi Yutaka)
Voiced by: Kenta Miyake

== Media ==
=== Video games ===
The initial entry in the franchise was a 2012 arcade game, Chō Soku Henkei Gyrozetter, which incorporates a physical collectible card game. The game has two modes, car racing and robot battling. The arcade machine features a transforming input, which switches between a steering wheel for vehicle mode and a joystick for the robot battle mode.

In 2013, a Nintendo 3DS port called Chōsoku Henkei Gyrozetter Arubarosu Wings was released.

=== Manga ===
A manga adaptation of the series, written and illustrated by Teruaki Mizuno, was serialized in Shueisha's Saikyō Jump manga magazine from October 2012 to April 2014.

=== Anime ===
A total of three theme songs are used, one opening and two endings. The opening is "Let's Go!" by Masahiko Kondō, the first ending is "Strobe" and the second ending, used from episode 18 onward, is "One Step", both by TEMPURA KIDZ. The series started on 2 October 2012 and ended on 24 September 2013.

==== Episode list ====
No.	Title	Original release date
1	"Raibird to the Front!"; Transliteration: "Raibādo Kakeru!" (Japanese: ライバード駆ける！！)	2 October 2012
Student Todoroki Kakeru learns he is a 'chosen driver', becomes involved with the battle with the evil organization Xenon, and is given a special transforming car - a Gyrozetter - named Raibird.
2	"The Secret of the Rosettagraphy"; Transliteration: "Rozettagurafī no Himitsu" (Japanese: ロゼッタグラフィーの秘密)	9 October 2012
Kakeru learns more about the secrets behind the Arcadian school and Gyrozetters, while his friend Rinne is revealed to be the second chosen driver.
3	"The Magnificent Third Driver!"; Transliteration: "Kareinaru Daisan no Doraibā!" (Japanese: 華麗なる第三のドライバー)	16 October 2012
When hints to the identity of the third chosen driver are deciphered on the Rosettagraphy, Kakeru decides they refer to his friend, Michie.
4	"Showdown! Racing Battle!"; Transliteration: "Taisetsu! Rēshingu Batoru!" (Japanese: 対決！レーシングバトル)	23 October 2012
Kakeru clashes with the new chosen driver, Shunsuke, leading to a race between the two highly competitive boys.
5	"Appearance! Eraser-01!"; Transliteration: "Tōjō! Irezā-01!" (Japanese: 登場！イレイザー-01！)	30 October 2012
With the chosen drivers heading to Mount Fuji for a training camp to improve their teamwork, Xenon prepares to unleash their secret weapon.
6	"Clash! Raibird vs. Guiltice!"; Transliteration: "Gekitō! Raibādo VS Giruteisu!" (Japanese: 激闘!ライバードVSギルテイス!)	6 November 2012
With Arcadia's forces under attack both at Mount Fuji and headquarters, Rinne must race to be back in time to save their base while Kakeru and Shunsuke take on the mysterious Eraser-01.
7	"Satori the Transfer Student"; Transliteration: "Denkousei Satori" (Japanese: 転校生サトリ)	13 November 2012
As the fifth chosen driver, Satori, transfers into Arcadia, Xenon's Haruka takes advantage of the situation to infiltrate their ranks.
8	"Dash! Disappearing AI Cars!"; Transliteration: "Shissou! Ēai Kā Shissōjiken!" (Japanese: 疾走！エーアイカー失踪事件！)	20 November 2012
With AI cars inexplicably disappearing all over the city, the chosen drivers take it on themselves to solve the mystery.
9	"The Stolen Gyro Commander"; Transliteration: "Nusumareta Jairo Komandā" (Japanese: 盗まれたジャイロコマンダー)	27 November 2012
Kakeru finds himself in hot water after being unable to find his Gyro Commander. Did he lose it, or was it stolen?
10	"Guiltice Returns!"; Transliteration: "Giruteisu Futatabi!" (Japanese: ギルテイス再び!)	4 December 2012
As Arcadia puts on a show to formally announce the existence of the Gyrozetters, Eraser-01 plans to crash the party.
11	"A Day Without Raibird"; Transliteration: "Raibaado no Inai Hi" (Japanese: ライバードのいない日)	11 December 2012
Kakeru struggles to deal with the aftermath of his last battle with Eraser-01, while Xenon attempt to steal Raibird's Moebuis engine.
12	"Complete! Raibird Hyper Spec"; Transliteration: "Kansei! Raibādo HS" (Japanese: 完成！ライバードHS)	18 December 2012
While Arcadia TV investigates reports of mysterious giant monsters, Eraser-01 attacks the Majima Institute and the Rosettagraphy.
13	"The Nightmare of Great Kraken"; Transliteration: "Gurēto Kurāken no Akumu" (Japanese: グレートクラーケンの悪夢)	25 December 2012
With the Arcadia TV crew in Xenon's clutches, the chosen drivers must face off against the giant Gyrozetters Dragnos and Great Kraken.
14	"Hyper Speed Special: Showcasing All Of Gyrozetter"; Transliteration: "Chō Soku Tokuban Zenbu Misemasu Jairozettaa" (Japanese: 超速特番全部見せますジャイロゼッター)	8 January 2013
Arcadia TV presents a special show summarizing all the events thus far, while a memory of his past stirs in Eraser-01...
15	"Nice to Meet You, Dolphine!"; Transliteration: "Hajimemashite Dorufīne!" (Japanese: はじめましてドルフィーネ)	15 January 2013
Feeling dejected and hurt after arguing with Kakeru, Rinne makes a new friend at the aquarium.
16	"A Mic-man's Love"; Transliteration: "Maikuman no Koi" (Japanese: マイクマンの恋)	22 January 2013
After Rinne mistakenly believes Saki and Mic-man Seki to be dating, she conscripts everyone into helping them out.
17	"Roaring! Death Match!"; Transliteration: "Bakusou! Desu Macchi!" (Japanese: 爆走！デスマッチ！)	29 January 2013
Kakeru, Rinne and Michie help their class president when her father, a professional wrestler named Devil III, goes missing after losing a fight.
18	"An Exciting Valentine"; Transliteration: "Tokimeki Balantain" (Japanese: ときめきバランタイン)	5 February 2013
As Valentine's Day approaches, Kakeru's refusal to see a dentist over a cavity leads to him being forbidden from eating chocolate.
19	"A Panda Comes to Town"; Transliteration: "Panda ga Machi ni Yattekita!" (Japanese: パンダが街にやってきた！)	12 February 2013
As the city welcomes a panda visitor, a team of emergency services Gyrozetters prepare for their debut.
20	"Birth of the Comedy Hero!"; Transliteration: "Owarai Hīrō Tanjō!" (Japanese: お笑いヒーロー誕生！)	19 February 2013
Wanting to become a comedian, Michie ropes Kakeru into appearing with him on a TV talent show.
21	"Let's Go! Smash Out the Rally!"; Transliteration: "Let's Go! Rarī de Kattobase!" (Japanese: Let's Go! ラリーでかっとばせ！)	26 February 2013
Kakeru and Shunsuke team up to take on the International AI Car Rally, facing off against competitors such as EnelX's Touma and Masahiko Kondō.
22	"Satori! The Shot of a Pledge!"; Transliteration: "Satori! Sakai no Ichigeki!" (Japanese: サトリ! さかいの一撃!)	5 March 2013
Feeling immature, Satori looks to her teacher Rui for inspiration on becoming a respectable woman.
23	"The Eraser Corps Appear!"; Transliteration: "Irezā Gundan Tōjō!" (Japanese: イレザー軍団登場！)	12 March 2013
As incidents of data disappearing crop up across the city, Arcadia TV's Todoroki Kenzou is more preoccupied with remembering why that day is special to his wife.
24	"Soar! Triple Twist Jump!"; Transliteration: "Tobe! Sankaiten Janpu！" (Japanese: 跳べ! 三回転ジャンプ！)	19 March 2013
Rinne gets into a fight with her brother Takumi, Shunsuke suspects the existence of a traitor in Arcadia, and Satori receives a mysterious message.
25	"The Gyro Ark's Close Call!"; Transliteration: "Jairoāku Kikippatsu!" (Japanese: ジャイロアーク危機一髪!)	26 March 2013
Shunsuke's suspicions of a traitor in Arcadia are confirmed when a bomb is planted on the Gyro Ark in mid-air.
26	"RRR Awakens! Secret of the Burst Core"; Transliteration: "Kakusei RRR! Bāsutokoa no Himitsu" (Japanese: 覚醒RRR！バーストコアの秘密)	2 April 2013
When the traitor is revealed and Commander Hisaishi kidnapped, Arcadia rushes to prepare a new type of Gyrozetter to rescue him.
27	"The Saki from the Future"; Transliteration: "Sono Saki no Mirai-kara" (Japanese: そのサキの未来から)	9 April 2013
Saki prepares a report on the events that have transpired so far, and rejoins her colleagues.
28	"Guiltice's Challenge"; Transliteration: "Girutisu no Hatashijō" (Japanese: ギルティスの果たし状)	16 April 2013
The final showdown between Kakeru and Eraser-01 brings forth memories of the past and a revelation.
29	"Sunset Lightning Slash"; Transliteration: "Yūyake Raitoningu Surasshu" (Japanese: 夕やけライトニングスラッシュ)	23 April 2013
New foes appear as Arcadia looks to rescue Gunji Souta from Xenon.
30	"A desperate situation! Raibird"; Transliteration: "Zettaizetsumei! Raibādo" (Japanese: 絶体絶命！ライバード)	30 April 2013
As Souta settles into life at Arcadia, another giant Xenon Gyrozetter attacks Arcadia to retrieve him.
31	"The Shining Edition Prophecy"; Transliteration: "Sono Yogen wa Shaining Edishon" (Japanese: その予言はシャイニングエディション)	7 May 2013
Transported to a unthinkable future, Kakeru and Rinne encounter new friends and some familiar faces.
32	"Roar! Moebius Overdrive!"; Transliteration: "Todoroke! Meviusu Ōbādoraibu" (Japanese: 轟け！メヴィウスオーバードライブ)	14 May 2013
After returning home, Kakeru and Rinne find that a week has passed and things have changed at Arcadia.
33	"Shining Edition Targeted"; Transliteration: "Nerawareta SE" (Japanese: 狙われたSE)	21 May 2013
34	"A Heart-Pounding Rainy Drive"; Transliteration: "Ame no Dokidoki Doraibu" (Japanese: 雨のドキドキドライブ)	28 May 2013
35	"Eraser 666 Has Arrived!"; Transliteration: "Ireizā 666 Kenzan!" (Japanese: イレイザー666見参！)	4 June 2013
36	"Cats, Fireworks and the Summer Festival"; Transliteration: "Neko to Hanabi to Natsu-matsuri" (Japanese: ネコと花火と夏まつり)	11 June 2013
37	"Surpass Mach! A BlaZing Race!!"; Transliteration: "Mahha o Koero! Gekisōda Z!!" (Japanese: マッハをこえろ！激走だZ！！)	18 June 2013
38	"King's Royal Road! Kimeraiger Appears!"; Transliteration: "Kingu no Ōdō! Kimeraigā Tōjō" (Japanese: キングの王道！キメライガー登場)	25 June 2013
39	"It Began Under the Shooting Stars"; Transliteration: "Hajimari wa Ryūsei no Shita de" (Japanese: はじまりは流星の下で)	2 July 2013
40	"Defeat Albaros, the Wings of Despair!"; Transliteration: "Zetsubō no Tsubasa! Arubarosu o Taose!" (Japanese: 絶望の翼！アルバロスを倒せ！)	9 July 2013
41	"A Mysterious Night in a Mysterious City"; Transliteration: "Fushigina Koto no Fushigina Yoru" (Japanese: 不思議な古都の不思議な夜)	16 July 2013
42	"Dangerous Summer Vacation on a Southern Island"; Transliteration: "Minami no Shima no Abunai Natsuyasumi" (Japanese: 南の島のアブナイ夏休み)	23 July 2013
43	"Start of the Arcadia Grand Prix!"; Transliteration: "Kaimaku! Arukadia GP!" (Japanese: 開幕！アルカディアGP！)	30 July 2013
44	"Prevent the Grand-Prix Destruction Plan!"; Transliteration: "Tomero! GP Hakai Keikaku!" (Japanese: とめろ！GP破壊計画！)	6 August 2013
45	"Final Showdown at the Arcadia Grand Prix!"; Transliteration: "Ketchaku! Arukadia GP" (Japanese: 決着！アルカディアGP)	13 August 2013
46	"An Excellent Day for Filming! Who's the Hero?"; Transliteration: "Satsuei Kaichō! Hīrō wa Dareda?" (Japanese: 撮影快調！ヒーローは誰だ！？)	20 August 2013
47	"Summer's End, Autumn's Beginning!"; Transliteration: "Natsu no Owari Aki no Hajimari" (Japanese: 夏の終わり秋の始まり)	27 August 2013
48	"To Haruka of the Distant Future"; Transliteration: "Haruka Naru Mirai no Kimi he" (Japanese: ハルカなる未来の君へ)	3 September 2013
49	"King of Hades, Death Xenon"; Transliteration: "Meifu no Ō! Desu Zenon" (Japanese: 冥府の王！デスゼノン)	10 September 2013
50	"The Gyrozetter Crisis"; Transliteration: "Jairozettā Sensō no Kiki" (Japanese: ジャイロゼッター戦争の危機)	17 September 2013
51	"Race to the Future, Kakeru and Raibird!"; Transliteration: "Mirai he Kakeru! Raibādo!" (Japanese: 未来へカケル！ライバード！)	24 September 2013

== See also ==
- Turning Mecard, cards and transforming cars mechanic
- Power Battle Watch Car (aka Wrist Racers), South Korean 3D animated series about AI cars that have various abilities and are controlled via wristwatches
