= Turning Mecard (TV series) =

South Korean animated television series

- Also known as: Mecard
- Korean: 터닝메카드
- Japanese: 至高の戦い！メカード
- Written by: Atsushi Maekawa (head writer)
- Directed by: Hong Heonpyo
- Composer: Kim Jungah (music director)
- Countries of origin: South Korea; Japan
- Original languages: Korean; Japanese; English
- No. of seasons: 1
- No. of episodes: 52

Production
- Executive producers: Choi Jongil; Kim Suntae
- Producers: Shim Hyewon; Lee Namhoon
- Production companies: Heewon Entertainment; Choirock; Sonokong; Animations; Paprika Entertainment; Production Reve; Synergy SP

Original release
- Network: KBS2
- Release: February 3, 2015 – February 5, 2016

Related
- Turning Mecard W Dino Mecard

Turning Mecard (Korean: 터닝메카드, a transliteration) is a South Korean-Japanese-American aeni/anime which is a part of the toyline and media franchise of the same name developed for toy company Sonokong by Choirock (Sonokong's multimedia production arm). The series was produced for Choirock by Heewon Entertainment, and was animated by Paprika Entertainment, Production Reve and SynergySP.

The series was followed by Turning Mecard W, which was aired between May 2016 and September 2017 in South Korea, then followed by a soft reboot titled Turning Mecard R in September 2017 and a spin-off titled Dino Mecard (Korean: 공룡메카드) in November 2017.

== Cast ==
Characters	English (Studiopolis)	Japanese
Dabby/Dom (JP: ドム)	Alex Cazares; Kate Bristol (ep 54-present)	Yoko Hikasa
Brandon/Simon (JP: サイモン)	Benjamin Diskin	Daisuke Ono
Jason/Jonah (JP: ジョナ)	Brandon Winckler; Erica Mendez	Satomi Kōrogi
Juliet/Julia (JP: ジュリア)	Cassandra Lee Morris; Amber Lee Connors (ep 54-present)	Yūko Sanpei Aoi Yūki (ep 31-present)
Isobel/Reira (JP: レイラ)	Cherami Leigh; Skyler Davenport	Saori Hayami
Dana/Dani (JP: ダニ)	Colleen Villard; Sarah Anne Williams (ep 54-present)	Ai Kakuma
Alta/Flamewing (JP: フレイムウィング)	Keith Silverstein	Noriaki Sugiyama
Kevin/Cody (JP: コーディ)	Kyle McCarley	Yuichi Nakamura
Ryan/Ace (JP: エース)	Nicolas Roye; Todd Haberkorn (ep 54-present)	Rica Matsumoto
Tero/Drago (JP: ドラゴ)	Vic Mignogna; Alejandro Saab (ep 54-present)	Ryō Horikawa
Evan/Kalas (JP: カラス)	Xander Mobus	Takanori Hoshino

== Release ==
=== South Korea ===
Turning Mecard premiered on 3 February 2015 on KBS2. Initially, it aired on Tuesdays until episode 30 (11 August 2015), but it moved to Fridays since episode 31 (21 August 2015). The show's finale aired on 5 February 2016.

=== Japan ===
Turning Mecard premiered in Japan on 6 February 2016 on TV Asahi. It initially aired at 2:30 PM until episode 20 (18 June 2016), but it moved to 3:15 PM since episode 21 (25 June 2016). The finale of the series aired on 11 February 2017.

=== Pakistan ===
In Pakistan, it was not aired in urdu , but english subtitles are available on youtube.

=== English-speaking areas ===
There are two existing English dubs for Turning Mecard.

One English version of Turning Mecard was produced for Choirock and Sonokong by BTI Studios Hong Kong. This version, however, does not credit the voice actors, translator, voice director and the recording studio on screen. The television channels that broadcast this version include Teletoon and Cartoon Network in Canada (premiering there on May 28 and June 4, 2017, respectively), 9Go! in Australia (premiered on 12 June 2017), Okto in Singapore (premiered on 5 May 2018), TV3 in Malaysia (premiered on 5 June 2018) and Cartoon Network in the Philippines (premiered on 15 December 2018).

The other version, simply titled Mecard, was produced by Studiopolis for Mattel, which released it on their Mecard website and through the Mattel Action YouTube channel beginning on January 26, 2018. It was also streamed on Toon Goggles. In Mattel's web release, each full episode is split into two parts. A 22-minute version of this dub aired on the syndicated KidsClick programming block in the United States from June 16, 2018 to January 20, 2019. This dub was cancelled after 26 half hour episodes with some cut edited from the original version.

== Reception ==
Turning Mecard toys became a fad in its native South Korea, helping propel Sonokong's stock price from ₩2,980 to a peak of ₩8,750 in 2015. The brand accounted for roughly 80% of the company's record-breaking ₩125 billion revenue that year. However, by 2017 sales for Mecard toys had slowed significantly.

Turning Mecard W: The Revival of Black Mirror ranked as the fifth highest-grossing film in South Korea in its weekend of release. The movie eventually grossed a total of ₩3.1 billion.

== See also ==
- aeni
- Chōsoku Henkei Gyrozetter, cards and transforming cars mechanic
- Power Battle Watch Car (aka Wrist Racers), South Korean 3D animated series, AI cars that have various abilities and are controlled via wristwatches
