= Bakugan Battle Brawlers =

Japanese-Canadian 2007 television anime

- Japanese DVD cover of protons volume 13 featuring the main characters (from top left to bottom right): Shun, Alice, Julie, Runo, Dan, and Marucho.

爆丸(ばくがん) バトルブローラーズ (Bakugan Batoru Burōrāzu)
- Genre: Action-adventure; Coming-of-age; Comedy drama Science fantasy
- Anime television series
- Directed by: Mitsuo Hashimoto
- Produced by: Joyce Miller; Junji Aoki
- Written by: Atsushi Maekawa
- Music by: Takayuki Negishi; Neil Parfitt
- Studio: TMS Entertainment; Japan Vistec; Nelvana; TV Tokyo; Teletoon
- Licensed by: AUS: Madman Entertainment (home video); IN: Dream Theatre Pvt. Ltd.; NA: Nelvana; SEA: Odex
- Original network: TXN (TV Tokyo)
- English network: Cartoon Network (United States); Teletoon (Canada)
- Original run: Japanese; April 5, 2007 – March 27, 2008; English; February 24, 2008; – February 28, 2009
- Episodes: 52
Further information
Anime television series
Battle Brawlers: New Vestroia
Directed by	Mitsuo Hashimoto
Produced by	Joyce Miller; Satoshi Kojima; Wataru Satou
Written by	Atsushi Maekawa
Music by	Takayuki Negishi; Neil Parfitt
Studio	Nelvana; TMS Entertainment; Teletoon
Licensed by	IN: Dream Theatre Pvt. Ltd.; NA: Nelvana Limited
Original network	TXN (TV Tokyo)
English network	AU: Network Ten; AUS: Cartoon Network; CA: Teletoon; IN: Cartoon Network; PH: Cartoon Network, GMA; PK: Cartoon Network; SEA: Cartoon Network; SG: Cartoon Network, Okto; UK: CITV, Cartoon Network, Cartoon Network Too; US: Cartoon Network
Original run	Japanese; March 2, 2010 – March 5, 2011; English; May 9, 2009; – May 22, 2010
Episodes	52
Anime television series
Gundalian Invaders
Directed by	Mitsuo Hashimoto
Produced by	Joyce Miller; Satoshi Kojima; Wataru Satou
Written by	Aaron Barnett
Music by	Neil Parfitt
Studio	Nelvana; TMS Entertainment
Licensed by	NA: Nelvana Limited; SEA: Odex
Original network	TV Tokyo (Japan); Teletoon (Canada); Cartoon Network (United States)
English network	AU: Network Ten, Eleven; CA: Teletoon; PH: Cartoon Network, GMA; SEA: Cartoon Network; SG: Cartoon Network, Okto; UK: CITV, Cartoon Network, Cartoon Network Too; US: Cartoon Network
Original run	Japanese; April 3, 2011 – January 22, 2012; English; May 29, 2010; – January 29, 2011
Episodes	39
Anime television series
Mechtanium Surge
Directed by	Mitsuo Hashimoto
Produced by	Joyce Miller
Written by	Aaron Barnett
Music by	Neil Parfitt
Studio	TMS Entertainment; Japan Vistec; Nelvana
Licensed by	NA: Nelvana; SEA: Odex
English network	AU: Network Ten; CA: Teletoon; PH: Cartoon Network, GMA; SEA: Cartoon Network; SG: Cartoon Network, Okto; UK: CITV, Cartoon Network, Cartoon Network Too; US: Cartoon Network
Original run	Japanese; September 2018 (Bilibili); English; March 5, 2011; – January 26, 2012
Episodes	46

Bakugan Battle Brawlers (爆丸バトルブローラーズ, Bakugan Batoru Burōrāzu) is a Japanese-Canadian animated television series produced by TMS Entertainment, Sega Toys, Japan Vistec, Spin Master, and Nelvana in association with Teletoon. The series was directed by Mitsuo Hashimoto and originally aired on TV Tokyo and its affiliates in Japan from April 2007 to March 2008.

The story centers around creatures known as Bakugan and the "Battle Brawlers", a group of young individuals who use them in strategic battles across various dimensions. The franchise was created as a joint venture between Sega Toys and Spin Master, with Nelvana contributing to the anime's international localization and distribution. TMS Entertainment and Sega Toys hold the original anime and character rights, while Spin Master is responsible for the development, manufacturing, and global distribution of the toy line. Cartoon Network Enterprises was appointed by Nelvana International as the series' exclusive licensing agent in the United States, Europe, and Africa.

Although originally broadcast by TV Tokyo in Japan, follow-up seasons (New Vestroia and Gundalian Invaders) premiered in Canada and the US before Japan. The fourth and final season, Mechtanium Surge, was never broadcast in Japan and instead aired in North American markets. However, a Japan-exclusive manga series, Baku Tech! Bakugan, ran from August 15, 2010, to January 15, 2014. It received an anime adaptation which aired on TV Tokyo from April 7, 2012, to March 30, 2013, followed by a second season called Baku Tech! Bakugan Gachi, which ran from April 6, 2013, to December 28, 2013.

In 2015, Spin Master and Nelvana revealed plans to relaunch Bakugan. The relaunch was later announced on November 30, 2017, to occur in the first quarter of 2019, with the series title announced as Bakugan: Battle Planet. The series premiered on Cartoon Network in the United States on December 23, 2018, while Canada's Teletoon premiered the series on December 31, 2018.

On June 16, 2023, a trailer for another reboot of Bakugan was released on YouTube. The reboot was released on Netflix on September 1, 2023, and started airing on Disney XD on September 23, 2023. The first two episodes were previewed on Roblox on August 4, 2023. The third incarnation only ran for one season.

== Plot ==
=== Season 1 ===
Dan's life changes one day when strange cards fall out of the sky and he grabs one, which he and his childhood best friend Shun use to invent a game they call "Bakugan." They form a group called the "Bakugan Battle Brawlers" with their friends and are dragged into fighting for the fate of Vestroia, the Bakugans' home dimension.

Vestroia loses its natural balance and merges with Earth and many other worlds. Naga, a rogue Bakugan, seeks the power of the Infinity and Silent Cores, which together formed the Perfect Core that balanced Vestroia, for himself. However, Naga has absorbed too much negative energy and been trapped within the Silent Core, destabilizing Vestroia. Naga now seeks the mighty Infinity Core so that he can complete the all-powerful Perfect Core and have absolute control over Earth and Vestroia.

=== Season 2: Battle Brawlers: New Vestroia ===
Three years have passed since the Brawlers defeated Naga and bid farewell to the Bakugan. Drago sacrificed his physical body to become the new Perfect Core, uniting the Bakugan's fractured homeworld and forming New Vestroia. However, aliens known as the Vestals arrive on New Vestroia and begin colonizing it, unaware that the Bakugan are intelligent beings. The Bakugan are returned to their primitive ball forms. Upon the defeat of Tigrerra, the last of the Fighting Bakugan of the Battle Brawlers, Drago is freed from his role as the Core of Vestroia. He is given a weaker, temporary body by the six Ancient Warrior Bakugan and once again seeks the help of Dan to help save his homeworld.

However, he chooses to leave behind the Battle Brawlers, except for Alice and Shun, out of concern for their safety. Despite this, Marucho leaves Runo and Julie behind to follow after him. Upon arriving at New Vestroia, Dan and Marucho encounter Mira, Ace, and Baron, Vestals who are members of the Bakugan Brawlers Resistance. Along the way, the brawlers reunite with Shun, who also joins the Resistance.

While battling against the evil Vexos, Vestal's top brawlers and servants of the Vestal royal family, the Resistance destroy the three Dimension Controllers that keep the Bakugan in their ball form, liberating New Vestroia. The Brawlers return to Earth, with the rest of the resistance returning home to Vestal. They reassemble six months later upon learning that King Zenoheld of Vestal attacked the Six Ancient Warriors in an attempt to steal their Attribute Energies. The Six Ancient Warriors engaged in battle with Zenoheld, but were unable to defeat his Mechanical Bakugan, Farbros.

In desperation, the Ancient Warriors give the Resistance Bakugan their attribute energies to protect them from Zenoheld. Zenoheld reveals the Bakugan Termination System, a machine built to wipe out all Bakugan that requires the Attribute Energies now held by the Resistance's Bakugan to power it. These energies result in the six Bakugan evolving. After losing half the energies, the Brawlers decide to attack instead, entering a temporary alliance with Spectra Phantom, the former leader of the Vexos, and his sidekick Gus Grav. However, the remaining energies are taken as the result of a trap field, and the Brawlers head to New Vestroia to evacuate the Bakugan. Drago, refusing to give up, manages to destroy the BT System by absorbing the six Attribute Energies, evolving again into Helix Dragonoid.

Spectra resurfaces to battle Dan; upon losing, he concedes that Drago is the strongest Bakugan and joins the Brawlers, returning to his original self, Keith Fermin. Keith reveals that Zenoheld is working on a powerful weapon called the Alternative System and helps construct Battle Gear for Drago. Meanwhile, the Vexos begin crumbling from within as Volt and Lync revolt after feeling that Zenoheld has crossed the line, but are disposed of by Prince Hydron. In the final battle, the Brawlers, Spectra, and Gus manage to destroy the Alternative System, ending Zenoheld for good. With the Alternative crisis over, Dan, Shun, and Marucho bid farewell to the Resistance and return to Earth. Weeks later, the trio is greeted by Ren Krawler, a Darkus Brawler from Gundalia.

=== Season 3: Gundalian Invaders ===
After defeating Zenoheld, the Brawlers return to Earth and, with the help of the newcomer Ren, restore Bakugan Interspace. However, Ren is not what he seems, and he reveals that he is a Gundalian whose home planet, Gundalia, is under attack by Neathia. Shun is not convinced and discovers that Ren is lying once Princess Fabia proves his story wrong. It is revealed that Neathia is under attack by Gundalians under the command of Barodius, their tyrannical emperor who seeks to harness the power of the Sacred Orb, the source of all Bakugan DNA. The Brawlers agree to help Fabia and head to Neathia to help fight off the Gundalians. Meanwhile, Ren begins showing signs of distrust for Barodius and eventually defects to rejoin the Brawlers. Jake is captured by Kazarina, Gundalia's leading Bakugan scientist, and brainwashed, so the Brawlers head to Gundalia to rescue him. They are aided by Ren's teammates, who were imprisoned for failure, Nurzak, a former advisor to Barodius who turned against him after seeing that he would lead Gundalia to ruin, and Mason Brown, a teammate who had escaped imprisonment and also sided with Neathia. The Twelve Orders mount a final attack on Neathia, and the Brawlers return in time to defend the planet while Dan and Barodius engage in a final battle. Ren and Mason's teammates, Jesse Glenn, Lena Isis, and Zenet Surrow are freed from brainwashing after Kazarina's demise at the hands of Gill. Linehalt uses his Forbidden Powers to restore the war-torn Neathia, while Barodius and Dharak are destroyed by an overload of vast energy and power from the Sacred Orb. This grants Drago new strength and abilities, allowing him to evolve into Titanium Dragonoid and granting him the status of rule over all Bakugan.

=== Season 4: Mechtanium Surge ===
==== Part 1 ====
The Brawlers' reign as number one in Bakugan Interspace is ended by two new powerful teams: Team Anubias and Team Sellon. Dan and Drago suffer from visions sent to them by Mag Mel and Razenoid, causing them to lose fans when Drago loses control in battle several times, threatening the lives of Interspace's citizens. Shun and Marucho find themselves unable to help as Dan is keeping everything to himself. When Dan loses control once again and nearly kills Anubias in battle, his fans abandon him and he leaves for New Vestroia to train. In Dan's absence, Shun becomes leader of the Battle Brawlers and tasks himself with returning the Brawlers to their former glory, but Paige and Rafe find the brawlers in disarray after attempting to learn from them. Dan becomes more uncaring and brushes off all opinions but his own while Marucho and Shun try to help him be a better leader. Eventually, Dan and Drago return, now able to control Drago's powers, as Marucho and Shun reunite and join up with Paige and Rafe. When the Chaos Bakugan start destroying Interspace, Spectra, who has changed his attribute from Pyrus to Darkus, appears to aid the Brawlers and destroys many of the Chaos Bakugan. Afterwards, Dan returns, but is out of sync and accidentally defeats his fellow brawlers with Zenthon. He tells them about Mag Mel, but Spectra left beforehand, disappointed in Dan having changed, while Shun leaves and dismisses Taylean's words. Dan later has a vision about Gundalia being attacked by a now freed Mag Mel and tells them about Gundalia, which Paige confirms. The Brawlers dismiss Dan and refuse to let him leave, but, after he insists that he is an original brawler and is not going to be cut from this fight, they let him come along to save Gundalia.

They face Mag Mel and discover Interspace being destroyed, and so return to Earth to save it; however, they are trapped and must figure out a way to save the gate, the key, the battlers, and Interspace. Anubias and Sellon reveal themselves as artificial lifeforms created by Mag Mel to assure his resurrection and succeed in taking Dan's Key. In a new battle, Dan learns that Mag Mel is actually Barodius, who survived his last encounter on Neathia after being transported to the dark reversed dimension created by Code Eve. He now plans to destroy Earth, Gundalia, Neathia, Vestal, and New Vestroia by sending all civilizations to the dark reversed dimension. In he and Dan's final battle against Mag Mel and Razenoid, Drago evolves one more time into the legendary Fusion Dragonoid. They win, but, before "disappearing", Mag Mel says that his final demise will cause another disaster to befall Dan and Drago.

==== Part 2 ====
Several months later, humans and Bakugan from New Vestroia now coexist, as humans in Bakugan City managed to commune with them. However, four Mechtogan led by Coredegon, who have broken free from their Bakugan, start terrorizing the city, and a new enemy, Wiseman, emerges along with ancient Bakugan called the Nonets. Wiseman has the appearance of Gunz Lazar, a new Haos Brawler who disappeared after the four Mechtogan attacked Bakugan City. It is later revealed that Wiseman is actually Coredegon in disguise, while the real Gunz was put in a coma so his negative energy was absorbed. After Coredegon, in his combined form as a Mechtogan Destroyer, and his friends send the Brawlers to the Doom Dimension, he destroys Earth and New Vestroia. With Gunz back to normal, the brawlers travel through time in order to stop Mechtavius Destroyer from killing humanity and Bakugan. In the final battle, Dragonoid Destroyer, Drago's last Mechtogan, acquires an infinite power that comes from the bond between Bakugan and humans all over the world, allowing them to defeat the Nonet Mechtogan and send them back between dimensions. Dan's friends throw him a party before he decides to depart on another adventure with Drago, having had enough time in the spotlight and wanting other Brawlers to have the opportunity to rise to his rank. Shun sees Dan and Drago sailing off using a boat borrowed from Kato.

== Media ==
=== Anime series ===
==== Bakugan Battle Brawlers ====
The first episode of the anime television series, produced by TMS Entertainment, Dentsu Inc., and Japan Vistec under the direction of Mitsuo Hashimoto, made its debut in Japan on TV Tokyo on April 5, 2007, and was rebroadcast six days later on BS Japan. Nelvana Limited produced the English-language version and premiered the series on the Canadian network Teletoon in July 8, 2007, and then on Cartoon Network on February 24, 2008.

==== Bakugan Battle Brawlers: New Vestroia ====
In March 2009, TMS and Nelvana Entertainment companies announced that a follow-up series, Bakugan Battle Brawlers: New Vestroia (爆丸 バトルブローラーズ ニューヴェストロイア, Bakugan Batoru Burōrāzu Nyū Vesutoroia), consisting of 26 episodes was in production. The series began airing on April 12, 2009, on Teletoon in Canada, followed by Cartoon Network in the U.S on May 9, 2009. Due to the ratings in Canada, New Vestroia was extended with an additional 26 episode order.

The Cartoon Network website aired a special called Maxus Unleashed, and marks a synopsis about the first 26 episodes.

New Vestroia was broadcast in Japan on TV Tokyo from March 2, 2010, at 7:00 pm. The opening song, titled "Cho! Saikyo! Warriors", is performed by Psychic Lover. The first ending was "Bang! Bang! Bakugan!" by Yoshifumi Ushima, while the second ending was "Communication Breakdown" by Crush Tears.

==== Bakugan: Gundalian Invaders ====
Publicly announced through Bakugan.com, the official My.Bakugan.com community, and other media, Spin Master announced a third series, titled Bakugan Battle Brawlers: Gundalian Invaders (爆丸 バトルブローラーズ ガンダリアンインベーダーズ, Bakugan Batoru Burōrāzu Gandarian Inbēdāzu). It premiered in Canada on May 23, 2010, and aired in the United States on May 29, 2010. The Japanese version premiered on April 3, 2011, and ended on January 22, 2012, before being replaced by the Japanese dub of Zoobles! in its initial timeslot. The new series ties into the online game Bakugan Dimensions through the use of special heat-reveal DNA codes on the new series of Gundalian Invaders Bakugan.

The first opening song "Ready Go!" is done by Sissy, while the second opening, "Mega・Meta", is done by Yu Kobayashi, Dan's voice actor. The first ending song, "Love the Music", is done by Lisp, while the second, "Tan-Kyu-Shin", is done by KREVA, and the third is "Love Go! Courage Go!", which was performed by TAKUYA.

==== Bakugan: Mechtanium Surge ====
In September 2010, Nelvana Entertainment announced a fourth and final season to the Bakugan series titled Bakugan Battle Brawlers: Mechtanium Surge (爆丸 バトルブローラーズ メクタニウムサージ, Bakugan Batoru Burōrāzu Mekutaniumu Sāji), which launched on February 13, 2011, in Canada and in United States on March 5, 2011. It was originally set for 26 episodes but was later extended to 46. While Mechtanium Surge was produced for North American audiences and was never aired in Japan, a localized version aired in Taiwan and Hong Kong, using a modified version of the New Vestroia credit animations and songs.

==== Baku Tech! Bakugan & Bakugan Gachi ====
In September 2010, Japanese children's anthology magazine CoroCoro Comic began serializing a Bakugan manga by Shingo Maki titled Baku Tech! Bakugan (爆TECH！爆丸, Bakuteku! Bakugan). The series starred a new cast of characters not related to the anime series. As of August 2011, three volumes have been collected. The anime adaptation of Baku Tech! Bakugan was animated by Shogakukan Music & Digital Entertainment and began aired on TV Tokyo from April 7, 2012, to March 30, 2013, as a segment on the show Oha Coro. It was followed by a second season called Baku Tech! Bakugan Gachi, which aired from April 6, 2013, to December 28, 2013, on TV Tokyo.

==== Bakugan: Battle Planet ====
In late 2018, a reboot of the initial anime series was launched in North America.

==== Bakugan ====
In late 2023, a second reboot was launched in North America, although it lasted for only one season.

=== Movie ===
On February 6, 2025, a live-action movie was reported to be in development with Brad Peyton as director, writer and producer.

== Games ==
=== Strategic game ===
Bakugan
- Ventus Balista
- Manufacturers: Takara Tomy; Sega Toys; Spin Master
- Illustrators: various artists
- Publishers: Takara Tomy; Sega Toys; Spin Master
- Years active: 2006–2012; 2018–2024
- Players: 2–4
- Setup time: 5–10 minutes
- Playing time: 30–60 minutes
- Chance: 8%
- Skills: Strategy, Arithmetic, Aim
- Website: www.bakugan.com

A strategic game called Bakugan was developed by Sega Toys and Spin Master and released in conjunction with the anime series, albeit beginning a year before the anime even started (2006). The game uses spherical, spring-loaded miniature figures, representing the Bakugan, which pop open when rolled onto special metal Gate cards. The objective of the game is to capture three Gate cards.

==== Reception ====
Bakugan marbles have been one of the top rated toys for children, winning awards and selling thousands of marbles a year.

According to IGN, it was one of the leading kids games for the Nintendo DS in 2009. The Toy Industry Association gave Bakugan Battle Brawlers the 2009 Property of the Year award, recognizing the property that has had the greatest success spreading its brand throughout the industry that year.

=== Card game ===
Bakugan Attack
- Type: trick-taking
- Players: 12–9, usually 11
- Skills: Card counting Timing
- Age range: 13+
- Cards: 56-card (3 2 for 3 players, 55 for 5)
- Deck: Special
- Rank (high→low): 11 10 9 8 7 6 5 4 3 2 1
- Play: Clockwise
- Playing time: 20–30 minutes
- Chance: Moderate

Related games
- Oh hell

The card game is played with a deck of 56 cards, consisting of 5 each of ranks 1–10, plus six additional cards which have special abilities in addition to a rank. There is no suit distinction. Although it's conceptually a trick-taking game, the player who wins the trick only saves one card on his score pile, discarding the rest; this allows for special cases where there is no single winner. At the beginning of each hand, each player rolls one die to determine the target number of captures. At the end of the hand, that player accumulates a penalty score equal to the difference between the target number and the actual number captured. The game lasts until some player has scored ten points, and the lowest score is the winner.

== Merchandising and product promotions ==
=== Toys and electronics ===
In August 2009, Digital Blue announced a line of Hadi branded electronics for the 20–55 (as confirmed in an interview of popular toys marketed at kids) age group. Products include branded digital cameras, alarm clocks and other electronics. The line was released in retail in Spring 2009.

The franchise generated significant revenue from merchandising and toy sales. By 2009, Bakugan had generated $1 billion in toy sales. In 2010, licensed merchandise sold $600 million worldwide. By 2010, the franchise had generated a total of $1.6 billion in merchandise sales.

=== Video games ===
On June 6, 2010, Spin Master announced on Bakugan.com that they were working on the online game 'Bakugan Dimensions' which would be released online for all Operating Systems that supported Adobe Flash. It was released for open Beta on June 2, 2010, but the beta was shut down on June 30, 2011, because the season for Gundalian Invaders had finished.

The DS, Wii, PlayStation 2 and 3, and Xbox 360 also developed a Bakugan game that follows the story of a player's original character with an attribute of its choice. It acts as an alternate plot to the series.

=== Other ===
In 2009, Frito-Lay introduced a set of 26 Bakugan tazos in packages of Cheetos in India. The promotion, which ran from June 10 to August 10, 2009, included a contest in which consumers could win other Bakugan prizes.

== Similar products ==
At least since 2016, Spin Master sued Alpha (over Screechers Wild!), Lingdong (over Eonster Hunter) and both Choirock and Mattel (over Turning Mecard (Note: Turning Mecard (released as Mecard in the United States) was developed by Choirock, which serves as a multimedia production arm of South Korean toy company Sonokong. Mattel became the largest shareholder of Sonokong in 2016, and was granted a worldwide license of Turning Mecard outside South Korea by Choirock. Previously, Sonokong acted as distributor and license holder of Bakugan Battle Brawlers toy line and media franchise within South Korea.)), alleging that the rival toys in question breached the Canadian company's patents related to Bakugan toys. Later, Spin Master and Alpha reached a settlement, in which Alpha would stop selling Screechers Wild! toys in Canada, the United States and the United Kingdom after January 31, 2019. Spin Master lost a case over Turning Mecard in Mainland China against Choirock in March 2019, but the lawsuits filed against Mattel in Canada, the United States and Mexico are still ongoing as of January 2019.
