= Turning Mecard =

South Korean media franchise

- Original work: Toys
- Owners: Sonokong (South Korea); Mattel (United States)

Films and television
- Film: Turning Mecard W: The Revival of Black Mirror
- Animated series: Turning Mecard; Turning Mecard W Turning Mecard R Dino Mecard; Ghost Mecard; Bbasha Mecard
- Television special: Turning Mecard W: The Secret of Van Dine

Miscellaneous
- Toy: Turning Mecard

Turning Mecard (Korean: 터닝메카드, a transliteration), released as Mecard in the United States, is a South Korean toyline and media franchise launched in 2014, developed for toy company Sonokong by Choirock (Sonokong's multimedia production arm). The toyline involves a model car that, using a card, transforms into an animal-shaped mecha.

Outside South Korea, it is marketed and distributed by American company Mattel, which formed a partnership with Sonokong and acquired a 12% equity stake in the South Korean company in 2016.

== Line-ups ==
Turning Mecard
- Other names: Mecard
- Company: Sonokong
- Country: South Korea
- Availability: 2014–present

- Turning Mecard (released as Mecard in the United States)
- Turning Mecard W
- Turning Mecard R
- Dino Mecard (Korean: 공룡메카드): a spin-off featuring dinosaur-shaped toys.
- Ghost Mecard
- Bbasha Mecard
- Mecard Ball

== Media ==
Television series

- Turning Mecard (Korean: 터닝메카드; 2015): The 52-episode animated television series was premiered on 3 February 2015 on KBS2, and concluded on 5 February 2016.
- Turning Mecard W (Korean: 터닝메카드 W; 2016): Season 1 (26 episodes) aired between 19 May and 17 November 2016 on KBS2. It was followed by season 2 (26 episodes) which aired between 2 March and 7 September 2017.
- Turning Mecard R (Korean: 터닝메카드 R; 2017): Part of the franchise's soft reboot, it was produced in 3D computer animation unlike other productions in the franchise. The 26-episode series was aired between 14 September 2017 and 5 April 2018 on KBS2.
- Dino Mecard (Korean: 공룡메카드; 2017): The television tie-in to the Dino Mecard spin-off was premiered on 23 November 2017 on KBS1.
- Ghost Mecard (Korean: 요괴메카드; 2018): ???.
- Bbasha Mecard (Korean: 빠샤메카드; 2019): ???.
- Mecard Ball (Korean: 메카드볼; 2021): ???.

Film

- Turning Mecard W: Black Mirror-ui buhwal (Korean: 터닝메카드 W: 블랙미러의 부활, lit. 'Turning Mecard W: Black Mirror Revives'; 2017): Taking place between W's season 1 finale and season 2 premiere, the film was released on 18 January 2017. The film ranked as the fifth highest-grossing film in South Korea in its weekend of release. The movie eventually grossed a total of KRW 3.1 billion.

Miniseries

- Turning Mecard W: Mechanimal Go (2016): The 9-part miniseries was aired on Sundays between 25 December 2016 and 19 February 2017 on Tooniverse (a specialty TV channel available on multichannel platforms).
- Turning Mecard W: Van Dyne-ui bimil (Korean: 터닝메카드 W: 반다인의 비밀, lit. 'Turning Mecard W: The Secret of Van Dyne'; 2017): Taking place after the finale of Turning Mecard W, the 6-part miniseries was aired on Sundays between 15 October and 19 November 2017 on Tooniverse. Later, it was edited into an abridged, feature-length film which was released in South Korean cinemas on 8 February 2018, and placed in eleventh place in the box office with KRW 120 million.

== Outside South Korea ==
Outside South Korea, Mattel is handling sales and distribution of Turning Mecard, as a result of a partnership deal the American company had with Sonokong in 2016; specifically, Choirock (Sonokong's multimedia production arm) granted a worldwide license of Turning Mecard to Mattel, and Mattel acquired a 12% equity stake in Sonokong, becoming the largest shareholder of the South Korean company.

Prior to the Mattel deal, Lingdong distributed the toyline within mainland China under license. Later, Lingdong released a similar toyline named Eonster Hunter to replace Turning Mecard in its line-up.

== Reception ==
The toyline became a fad in its native South Korea, helping propel Sonokong's stock price from KRW 2,980 to a peak of KRW 8,750 in 2015. The brand accounted for roughly 80% of the company's record-breaking KRW 125 billion revenue that year. However, by 2017 sales for Mecard toys had slowed significantly.

== Criticism and controversy ==
=== Similarities with Bakugan ===
Sonokong was the distributor and license holder of Bakugan toyline and media franchise within South Korea. Japanese writer Atsushi Maekawa worked as the head writer of both Bakugan and Mecard animated series.

Spin Master, a Canadian toy company which co-developed Bakugan with Sega Toys in Japan, launched a series of lawsuits against Choirock and Mattel, alleging that the Mecard toys infringe Spin Master's patents related to the Bakugan toys. Spin Master brought the case against Choirock to a court in mainland China in 2016, but lost in the first trial, and lost again in the second trial in March 2019.

Separately, Spin Master sued Mattel (which distributes Mecard toys outside South Korea and mainland China) in the U.S. District Court for the Central District of California over the alleged infringement (which the Canadian company confirmed in a press release published on 25 April 2018). This and other lawsuits filed against Mattel in Canada and Mexico are still ongoing as of January 2019.

Spin Master's legal actions came as Bakugan was given a reboot in 2019, and it follows similar moves made by the Canadian company against Chinese toy manufacturers.
