= Sonokong =

Korean game entertainment company

Sonokong Co, Ltd. (Korean: 손오공주식회사) is a Korean toy/game entertainment company. It was established in 1974. The corporate headquarters are located in Sugung-dong Guro-gu Seoul, Korea. The technical license of the company is owned by Takara and Hasbro.

== History ==
The firm began in 1974 participating in Hyeopseong Industry. In 1985 Seoul Chemical was established. In 1996 the company was renamed from Seoul Chemical to Sonokong. In 2016 the firm's exclusivity agreement with Takara Tomy expired. Twelve percent of the company was sold to Mattel.

== Products ==
- Robots
- Dolls
- Model Cars
- Games
- Gaming Software
- Motion Picture Entertainment
- Trade Card Games
- Yonggary

== Animation ==
- Jang Geum's Dream (with Munhwa Broadcasting Corporation)
- K-Cops
- Transformers (with Hasbro)
- Beyblade (Korean name is Top Blade, with Seoul Broadcasting System (SBS) and TV Tokyo)
- B-Daman
- Battle Beadman & Fire Beadman (with Korean Broadcasting System (KBS) and Heewon Entertainment)
- Bumperking Zapper (with Daewon C&A Holdings and SBS (Korea))
- Vroomiz (SamG Animation)
- Speed Storm (with SBS)
- Track City (with SBS)
- The White Dog (with SBS)
- Turning Mecard (with KBS and Heewon Entertainment)
- Road To Friendship (MBC)
- Dragon Rising (MBC)
- Animal Academy (MBC)
- Hello Carbot (with Choirock Contents Factory)
- Miniforce (SamG Animation)
- Legendary Detective (Netflix)
- Choro The Pro Fighter (Netflix)

== See also ==
- Economy of South Korea
