= Baku Tech! Bakugan =

Japanese manga series

- Cover of the first manga volume

爆TECH! 爆丸 (BakuTech! Bakugan)
- Manga
- Written by: Shingo
- Published by: Shogakukan
- Magazine: CoroCoro Comic
- English magazine: Co-Co! (Hong Kong)
- Original run: August 15, 2010 – January 15, 2014
- Volumes: 10
- Anime television series
- Directed by: Takao Kato
- Produced by: Tetsuo Uchida
- Written by: Mayori Sekijima
- Music by: Shuhei Naruse
- Studio: SMDE
- Original network: TXN (TV Tokyo)
- Original run: April 7, 2012 – March 30, 2013
- Episodes: 51
- Anime television series

Baku Tech! Bakugan Gachi
- Directed by: Junji Nishimura
- Produced by: Tetsuo Uchida
- Written by: Mayori Sekijima
- Music by: Shuhei Naruse
- Studio: SMDE
- Original network: TXN (TV Tokyo)
- Original run: April 6, 2013 – December 28, 2013
- Episodes: 39

Baku Tech! Bakugan (Japanese: 爆TECH! 爆丸) is a manga series written and illustrated by Shingo. In Japan, the comics have been published in Shogakukan's Monthly CoroCoro comics since September 2010. The manga follows the adventures of Harubaru Hinode and his childhood friend and rival, Raichi Kuronashi, as they battle with their BakuTech, which are superior to normal Bakugan due to special metal parts.

== Background ==
Baku Tech! Bakugan's was serialized in the Monthly CoroCoro comics, where the chapters do not have names, but rather chapter numbers instead. The chapter names only appear in the shinsōban manga volumes.

The individual chapters are collected by Shogakukan in a series of shinsōban volumes. The first volume was released on December 24, 2010. The last volume was released on February 28, 2014.

== Characters ==
- Hinode Harubaru (日ノ出 春晴(ひので はるばる)): A Pyrus brawler. Voiced by Marie Mizuno.
- Kuronashi Raichi (黒無 来智(くろなし ライチ)): Harubaru's friendly rival, and a Darkus brawler. Voiced by Miku Watanabe.
- Master Shimo (マスター・シモ): The Mentor of Team Dragaon from the Bakugan Dojo. Voiced by Masanori Machida.
- Tatsuma (タツマ): A rookie described as a prodigy. The third protagonist of the anime series. An Aquos Brawler. Voiced by Yuri Yamaoka.
- Koh Grif (グリフ・コウ): One of the heirs of the Grif Plutocracy. Haos Brawler. Voiced by Kozo Dozaka.
- Sho Grif (グリフ・ショウ): Koh's older brother and a Ventus brawler. Voiced by Ryo Agawa.
- Quilt (キルト): Master Shimo's teacher. Aquos Brawler. Voiced by Kazuyoshi Shiibashi.
- Karashina (カラシナ): Leader of the Shadow Sanjuushi who specializes in "ninja techniques," and brawls with Darkus Bakugan. Voiced by Hiro Nakajima.
- Tohga (トーガ): Imposing member of Shadow Sanjuushi and a Subterra brawler. Voiced by Mitsuaki Kanuka.
- Jinza (ジンザ): Member of the Shadow Sanjushi. A boy of few words and a Haos brawler. Voiced by Yumi Uchiyama..
- Master Jyou (マスター・ジョウ): Principal of Bakugan Juku, and Master Shimo's rival. Voiced by Soichiro Abe.
- Zakuro (ザクロ): Primary antagonist in the manga. Leader of the Bakuthieves. A Darkus brawler. Voiced by Hidenori Takahashi.
- Harou Kido (木戸破凰(きどはろう)): Also known as King Harou and Harou Dodgy. He is the two-time (manga) or three-time (anime) champion of the BakuTech Colosseum. Voiced by Masaaki Kouda.
- Master Grizz (マスター・グリズ): An imposing Subterra brawler dressed in bear suit. Voiced by Hiroaki Tajiri.
- Master Odore (マスター・オドレ): A lanky Ventus brawler that practices Capoeira. Voiced by Shizuma Hodoshima.
- Honoo Moetaro (炎もえたろー): A Bakugan master explaining the trials to Harubaru. Does not appear in the anime but appears in Live Action in Bakugan tournaments across Japan.
- Siam (シャム): A rare Bakugan hunter and Haos brawler. Does not appear in the anime.
- Atla (アトラ): Harubaru's opponent in round 1 of Baku TECH tournament. Does not appear in the anime.
- Orochi (オロチ): Raichi's opponent in round 1 of Baku TECH tournament. Does not appear in the anime.
- Shagi (シャギ): Raichi's opponent in round 2 of Baku TECH tournament. Does not appear in the anime.
- Hyoga (ヒョーガ): Raichi's opponent in round 2 of Baku TECH tournament. Does not appear in the anime.
- Catol (キャトル): Grif brothers' opponent in Baku TECH tournament. Does not appear in the anime.
- Mister Up (ミスター・アップ): Younger version of Master Jyou.
- Mister Down (ミスター・ダウン): Younger version of Master Shimo, and Mister Up's companion.

== Volume list ==
No.	Release date	ISBN
1	December 24, 2010	978-4-09-141195-2
2	March 28, 2011	978-4-09-141234-8
3	August 26, 2011	978-4-09-141234-8
4	March 28, 2012	978-4-09-141397-0
5	April 27, 2012	978-4-09-141436-6
6	August 28, 2012	978-4-09-141493-9
7	January 25, 2013	978-4-09-141576-9
8	April 26, 2013	978-4-09-141633-9
9	September 27, 2013	978-4-09-141589-9
10	February 28, 2014	978-4-09-140029-1

== Adaptations ==
An anime adaptation had been green-lit. The series premiered in TV Tokyo, TV Osaka, TV Aichi, TV Hokkaido, TV Setouchi, TVQ Kyushu Broadcasting on April 7, 2012, as part of the Oha Coro POP programme.

Baku Tech! Bakugan Gachi television series premiered in TV Tokyo from April 6, 2013, to December 28, 2013, as part of the Oha Coro POP programme, followed by TV Setouchi and TVQ Kyushu Broadcasting on 2013-04-13.
