= Sega Fave =

Japanese toy and video game company owned by Sega Corporation

Sega Fave Corporation
- Native name: 株式会社セガ フェイブ
- Romanized name: Kabushiki gaisha Sega Feibu
- Formerly: S'Pal Co., Ltd. (1991-1994); Sega-Yonezawa, Co., Ltd. (1994–1998); Sega Toys Co., Ltd. (1998–2024)
- Type: Subsidiary
- Industry: Toys; Arcade games
- Predecessors: Yonezawa Toys; Sega Enterprises (toy division); Sega (amusement machine division)
- Founded: February 1991; 35 years ago
- Headquarters: Nishi-Shinagawa, Shinagawa, Tokyo, Japan
- Area served: Worldwide
- Key people: Yukio Sugino (president, Representative Director); Taketo Oshima (Executive Vice President, Director of the Board); Naoko Miyazaki (Executive Vice President, Director of the Board)
- Products: Arcade games; Arcade systems; Toys
- Revenue: ¥100 million
- Owner: Yonezawa Toys (1991–1994); Sega Corporation (1994–2005); Sega Sammy Holdings (2005–2015); Sega Group Corporation (2015–2021); Sega Corporation (2021–present)
- Number of employees: 859
- Subsidiaries: Dartslive; Sega Logistics Services; Sega Toys (HK) Co., Ltd.
- Website: segafave.co.jp

Sega Fave Corporation, (Note: Japanese: 株式会社セガ フェイブ, Hepburn: Kabushiki gaisha Sega Feibu) previously known as Sega Toys Co., Ltd. until 2024, is a Japanese toy and arcade company which is a wholly owned subsidiary of Sega Sammy Holdings. The company was founded when Yonezawa Toys, Japan's largest post-war toy manufacturer, was absorbed into Sega in 1991 as Sega-Yonezawa.

Sega Toys have created toys for children's franchises such as Oshare Majo: Love and Berry, Mushiking: King of the Beetles, Lilpri, Bakugan, Jewelpet, Rilu Rilu Fairilu, Dinosaur King, and Hero Bank. Products by Sega Toys released in the West include the Homestar and the iDog. Sega Toys also inherited the Sega Pico edutainment system and produced software for the console.

As part of a restructuring plan in 2024, Sega Toys took over Sega's amusement machine publishing business (including manufacturing and sales of arcade games) and renamed to its current name, Sega Fave. This was the first time since Sega Interactive in 2015, that Sega's amusement machine businesses was represented by a separate company.

== History ==
Logo until 1986

Yonezawa Toys (米澤玩具(よねざわがんぐ), Yonezawa Gangu) (known also as Yone or simply Y) was founded in the 1950s in Tokyo. It was one of Japan's largest and most prodigious post-war toy manufacturers and an early participant in the growing radio control market. It is a former subsidiary of Union Carbide as toy division.

The company focused on the production of thousands of different electrically operated and mechanical toys through the early 1970s. Some were branded not as Yonezawa but as STS. It is unclear as to the origin of the STS label, but it is presumed to be that of an importer. Yonezawa briefly dabbled in radio control in the mid-1980s with the introduction of the 1/10-scale Wave Hunter buggy, sold in North America as the Monogram Lightning.

Under Sega's leadership, Yonezawa Toys was briefly known as Sega-Yonezawa until the Yonezawa branding was dropped entirely in April 1998. Once Sega Sammy Holdings was formed, Sega Toys was reorganized under Sega's entertainment contents business.

Since the early 2000s, Sega Toys markets itself distinctively from the Sega brand, with some occasional collaboration between the two. An example of their collaboration is Sega and Sega Toys producing the UFO Catcher prize games jointly, where Sega manufactures the arcade equipment, while Sega Toys produces the prizes.

In January 2024, Sega Sammy announced that it has resolved to transfer the Amusement Machine business of Sega to Sega Toys, while also changing the name of Sega Toys to Sega Fave Corporation which took effect by April of that year.

The model car line started with Taiseiya Company, which had been making 1:80 diecast cars called Micro Pet. The name was changed to Cherryca Phenix in 1962. In 1965, Taiseiya was bought by Yonezawa. Yonezawa used the name Diapet to cover these and its own range of 1:24 to 1:18 cars. In the 1990s, some 1:43 sets were issued as the Collection Club.
