= Ronnen Harary =

Canadian billionaire businessman

- Born: March 1, 1971 (age 55); Ontario, Canada
- Education: University of Western Ontario
- Known for: Co-founder and chair of Spin Master; Co-creator of PAW Patrol
- Website: https://www.ronnenharary.com/

Ronnen Harary (born March 1, 1971) is a Canadian entrepreneur, television and film producer, philanthropist, and billionaire. He is a co-founder of Canadian children's entertainment company Spin Master and the co-creator of Paw Patrol, a preschool series that airs in 160 countries. Along with childhood friend Anton Rabie, he founded Spin Master shortly after graduating from the University of Western Ontario, and they were co-CEOs of the company from 1994 to 2021.

== Early life ==
Ronnen Harary was born to a Jewish family in South Africa. He moved to Canada when he was five years old and grew up in Toronto. He earned a bachelor's degree in political science from the University of Western Ontario. Harary has dysgraphia, which means he has difficulty converting the sounds of language into written form.

== Career ==
=== Spin Master Toys ===
Harary and Rabie first teamed up in university, forming Campus Faces, a company that made a profit selling advertising along the side of posters. In 1994, soon after graduating from university, they founded Spin Master, and were joined by Ben Varadi, a former classmate of Anton's. With an initial investment of $10,000 each, they were able to launch their first product, the Earth Buddy: a nylon-stocking-covered head of sawdust, topped with grass seeds, which grew to emulate hair. Earth Buddy generated $1.5 million in sales within the first six months of business launch and springboarded Spin Master into the toy industry.

Following the success of Earth Buddy, the founders introduced a number of successful toys into the market, including Devil Sticks, in 1995, and Air Hogs, in 1998. The Air Hogs Sky Shark put Spin Master became one of the most popular toys in the world.

From 2002 to 2007, Spin Master expanded its international footprint, establishing sales and distribution offices across western Europe. The company also opened a marketing and design hub in Los Angeles, which allowed the company to access local toy design, marketing and engineering talent. During this time, Spin Master made its first significant acquisition, acquiring X-Concepts, Inc., maker of Tech Deck. Spin Master's growth allowed the company to expand its licensing capabilities and relationships with major entertainment companies.

One of Spin Master’s most successful toy lines, Bakugan, was launched in 2007. Working with Sega, TMS, Japan Vistec, Corus Entertainment, and Nelvana. It was successful because a revenue sharing model was instituted that the company continues to use.

Harary was one of the co-creators of Paw Patrol, a TV series and toy line created in 2010.

Through a number of major acquisitions, Spin Master has become a steward of several legacy toy brands. In 2013, Spin Master acquired the Erector Set by Meccano, a line of model construction sets. In 2015, Spin Master acquired Cardinal Industries, a 60-year-old game and puzzles company, making Spin Master the second largest games company in the U.S. That same year, Spin Master made its initial public offering on the Toronto Stock Exchange.

The company continued to diversify its product offering over the next several years with new acquisitions, including the purchase of Etch A Sketch as well as water and outdoor sports company Swimways Corporation, in 2016, and of 120-year old premium plush toy brand GUND, in 2018. In 2022, Spin Master acquired Rubik’s Brand Ltd., owner of one of the best-selling toys of all time, Rubik’s Cube.

=== Spin Master Digital Games ===
In 2016, as children’s play patterns were shifting to the digital world, Spin Master purchased digital game and mobile app developers Toca Boca and Sago Mini from the Bonnier Group of Sweden, which expanded the presence of its Digital Games creative centre.

=== Spin Master Ventures ===
Ronnen Harary and Anton Rabie established Spin Master Ventures (SMV) to help keep pace with innovation in the children’s entertainment space. The focus of SMV is to facilitate growth in each of the company's three creative centers: Toys, Entertainment and Digital Games. Its intention is to establish Spin Master as a partner of choice for entrepreneurs looking for capital, while also bolstering the company’s product development pipeline.

=== Spin Master Entertainment ===
Ronnen Harary led the development of several programming and entertainment franchises for children, including PAW Patrol, Bakugan, Rusty Rivets, and Mighty Express, as well as more multiplatform entertainment series, which are available in more than 170 countries. The popularity of the series worldwide is attributed to the fact that they transcend cultural boundaries, with universal characters and storylines that have travelled the globe.

In August 2021, PAW Patrol: The Movie, Spin Master’s first foray into feature film, was released in theatres. In November 2021, Spin Master announced that the sequel - PAW Patrol: The Mighty Movie, is set for a theatrical release on October 13, 2023. Ronnen Harary served as Executive Producer for both films.

Harary also served as Executive Producer for over 10 TV series, including PAW Patrol, Rusty Rivets, Super Dinosaur, and Bakugan Battle Brawlers.

== Covid-19 Response ==
In early 2020, Ronnen Harary spearheaded the creation of a face shield for healthcare workers. The face shield was created by a team of Spin Master employees, using existing Hedbanz head bands, to which they attached plastic (polyethylene terephthalate or PET) inserts. Spin Master donated more than 400,000 face shields to over 120 hospitals, shelters and long-term care facilities.

== Awards ==
In 1999, Ernst & Young named Spin Master partners Anton Rabie, Ronnen Harary, and Ben Varadi their Young Entrepreneurs of the Year (World-Canada Ontario Region).

In 1999, Spin Master partners Anton Rabie, Ronnen Harary, and Ben Varadi were named the youngest ever (at the time) honorees of Canada’s Top 40 Under 40.

In 2006, Spin Master was named one of Canada's Best Managed Companies (2000 – 2004) and was the focus of a chapter in the book "Building the Best: Lessons from Inside Canada's Best Managed Companies."

In 2010, Fast Company recognized Spin Master as the year’s Most Innovative Consumer Products Company.

In 2014, Walmart - the world’s largest retailer - named Spin Master their Toy Supplier of the Year.

In 2017, Spin Master was recognized by Interbrand Canada as one of 150 Iconic Canadian Brands in its report "The Interbrand 150: Iconic Canadian Brands Report: Our Time to Grow ."

In 2018, Spin Master was recognized as one of Canadian Business magazine's Growth 500 winners.

In 2022, Spin Master earned a spot on the "Best Workplaces for Innovators List" by Fast Company.

Since 2002, Spin Master has received 124 TIA Toy of The Year (TOTY) nominations with 33 wins across a variety of product categories, including 13 TOTY nominations for Innovative Toy of the Year, more than any other toy company.

In 2020, Spin Master’s Entertainment Team won four Canadian Screen Awards, presented by the Academy of Canadian Cinema & Television, for its preschool series PAW Patrol. The series won Canadian Screen Awards for the Best Pre-School Program or Series, Best Sound - Animation, and Best Original Music - Animation categories, for the second year in a row. PAW Patrol also received the award for Best Direction in the animation category.

In 2022, Spin Master won The Golden Screen Award for Feature Film, presented by the Academy of Canadian Cinema & Television, for PAW Patrol: The Movie. The Golden Screen Award is presented to the Canadian film with the biggest box office gross of the year. PAW Patrol: The Movie has grossed over $7.5 million in Canadian box office sales and $152 million globally.

In 2022, Ronnen Harary, Anton Rabie and Ben Varadi were inducted into the Canadian Toy Hall of Fame for their contributions to the toy industry.

Having retained its Best Managed Company status for more than seven consecutive years, Spin Master is a Platinum Club Member of Deloitte's Best Managed Companies list.

== Philanthropy ==
=== Spin Master ===
==== Spin Master Innovation Fund ====
Every year, since 2010, Spin Master has teamed up with Futurpreneur Canada to support innovative young entrepreneurs through the Spin Master Innovation Fund. This program annually supports up to 10 businesses, awarding them each $50,000 in start-up financing, a hand-matched mentor, and a trip to the Spin Master head office in Toronto to attend a two-day Innovation Launch Pad Workshop, with access to senior Spin Master executives.

==== The Toy Movement ====
In 2014, Ronnen Harary co-founded The Toy Movement, a Spin Master-led, global initiative that (as of 2022), has provided over 850,000 toys to displaced and disadvantaged children in impoverished countries around the world.

===== Toy Invention Program =====
In 2019, Ronnen Harary spearheaded the launch of the Toy Invention Program (T.I.P.), a program designed to encourage future generations of toy inventors. T.I.P offers students the opportunity to get professional toy invention training through various universities’ departments of continuing education, in collaboration with Spin Master. The T.I.P. was originally offered as a one-year program at Toronto Metropolitan University (formerly Ryerson University). It is modeled off a similar collaboration between Spin Master and Israel’s Shenkar College of Engineering, Design and Art. The T.I.P. has since expanded to Kingston University in London, England, and to Doshisha University in Kyoto, Japan.

==== Other ====
Spin Master donates toys to a number of charitable organizations that focus on children in need.

Spin Master invests in hundreds of charitable organizations and educational programs in over 18 countries, to help children and youth learn through play. In 2021, the company made $1.95M USD in cash donations.

In 2020, Spin Master launched three strategic partnerships with organizations that share its vision: The Boys & Girls Clubs of America (BGCA), The Learning Partnership, and Children’s Aid Foundation of Canada.

=== Personal philanthropy ===
Since 2013, Ronnen has raised funds for Save a Child's Heart through annual exhibitions of his photography.

In 2017, Ronnen Harary and Anton Rabie made a donation to help improve the facilities at their childhood camp, Camp Northland-B'nai Brith.

Ronnen Harary is a benefactor of the Naggar School of Art and Society in Jerusalem, where a campus was named after him.

==== Ronnen Harary Foundation ====
The Ronnen Harary Foundation was established in 2020. It has two main objectives: first, to support the development and beautification of public spaces in Jerusalem and Toronto; and second, to help young people with learning disabilities reach their full academic potential. The foundation's most recent project, Full Potential Scholarship, supports Canadian students with learning challenges in their pursuit of post-secondary education in Ontario.

== Publications ==
- No Experience Necessary: Why Betting on Yourself in Your Twenties Is the Best Decision You'll Ever Make (2026), published by Crown Currency.

== Personal life ==
Ronnen Harary lives in Toronto, Canada.

== Filmography ==
Ronnen Harary is Executive Producer of the following TV series and films:

=== TV series ===
Year	Title
2007–2012	Bakugan Battle Brawlers
2011–2013	Redakai: Conquer the Kairu
2013–2014	Tenkai Knights
2013–present	Paw Patrol
2016–2020	Rusty Rivets
2018–2019	Super Dinosaur
2018–2023	Bakugan: Battle Planet
2019–2022	Abby Hatcher
2019–2020	Dragamonz
2020	Zo Zo Zombie
2020–2022	Mighty Express
2022–present	Sago Mini Friends
2023–present	Rubble & Crew
2023–2024	Bakugan
2023–present	Vida the Vet

=== Films ===
Year	Title
2021	Paw Patrol: The Movie
2023	Paw Patrol: The Mighty Movie
