= FRAP =

FRAP or frap may stand for:

== Acronym ==
- Facilitated Risk Analysis Process
- Federal Rules of Appellate Procedure
- Ferric Reducing Ability of Plasma, also Ferric ion reducing antioxidant power, a simple assay of antioxidant content in foods
- Fluorescence recovery after photobleaching, an experimental technique in cell biology
- Fluoride-resistant acid phosphatase
- Frenetic Random Activity Periods / Frenetic Random Acts of Play / Frantic Running and Playing (dog behavior and cat behavior)
- Frente de Acción Popular, a Chilean coalition gathering left-wing parties from 1956 to 1969
- Frente Revolucionario Antifascista y Patriótico (Revolutionary Anti-Fascist Patriotic Front), a Marxist–Leninist revolutionary organization (1971–1978) using violence against Francoist Spain
- Front d'action politique, a municipal political party in Montreal in 1969–1971
- Front Révolutionnaire d’Action Prolétarienne, a far-left terrorist organisation (fl. 1985) active in Belgium

== Word ==
- A method of tightening a lashing (ropework) by wrapping the rope around the lashing's core to help enforce it
- An abbreviation for Frappuccino, a trademarked coffee beverage
- Frapping, an alternate term for clawhammer banjo technique

== See also ==
- Frop (disambiguation)
- Fraps, the video utility software
