= Expanding toy =

Expanding toy may mean:

- Grow monsters, toys that expand in water
- Hoberman sphere
