= Spin Master =

Canadian toy and entertainment company

Spin Master Corp.
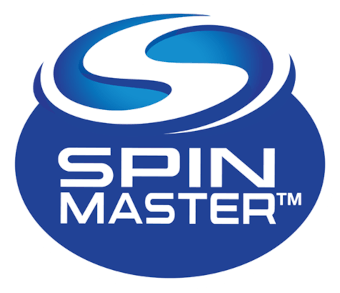
- Logo used since 2012
- Formerly: Seiger Marketing, Inc. (1994–1995); Spin Master, Ltd. (1995–2005)
- Type: Public
- Traded as: TSX: TOY
- Industry: Toys and entertainment
- Founded: March 26, 1994; 32 years ago
- Founder: Ronnen Harary; Anton Rabie; Ben Varadi
- Headquarters: 225 King Street W., Suite 200; Toronto, Ontario, Canada
- Area served: Worldwide
- Key people: Christina Miller (CEO)
- Brands: Paw Patrol; Abby Hatcher; Air Hogs; Bakugan'; Editrice Giochi; Gund; Hatchimals; Meccano; Mighty Express; Rubik's Cube; Perplexus; Toca Boca; Vida the Vet; Unicorn Academy
- Revenue: $2.042 billion (2021)
- Owners: Ronnen Harary; Anton Rabie
- Number of employees: 2,000+ (December 2021)
- Divisions: SwimWays; Spin Master Games; Spin Master Entertainment; Spin Master Digital Games; Spin Master Studios
- Subsidiaries: Swimways Corporation; Marbles; Toca Boca; Nördlight; Melissa & Doug
- Website: Spinmaster.com

Spin Master Corp. (formerly known as Spin Master Toys) is a Canadian multinational toy and entertainment company headquartered in Toronto, Ontario. Spin Master employs over 1,600 people globally with offices in Australia, Canada, China, France, Germany, Hong Kong, Italy, Japan, Mexico, the Netherlands, Poland, Slovakia, Sweden, the United Kingdom, the United States, and Vietnam.

In 2022, Spin Master won The Golden Screen Award for Feature Film, presented by the Academy of Canadian Cinema & Television, for Paw Patrol: The Movie. Spin Master received the "Toy of the Year" and "Action Figure of the Year" awards at the 2026 Toy of the Year Awards.

== History ==
Three university friends from the Ivey Business School at the University of Western Ontario - Ronnen Harary, Anton Rabie and Ben Varadi - founded Spin Master Toys with $10,000 in Toronto in early 1994. The company's first product, Earth Buddies, were small heads made out of Kmart pantyhose and grass seeds, which grew "hair" when watered. The Earth Buddy went on to sell over 26,000 units.

Spin Master Toys' first major success came in 1998 with the launch of the Air Hogs brand and its first item, the Sky Shark. Developed from the prototype provided by inventors John Dixon and Peter Manning, the Sky Shark was a foam plane that used compressed air to enable outdoor flight. Product development took over two years and more than $500,000, but ended up generating $103 million in revenue over the next few years. The Sky Shark put Spin Master Toys on the map, becoming one of the most popular toys in the world and earning them a slot on daytime television Regis and Kathie Lee alongside other international press.

The company, which had grown to 28 employees by 1999, told the LA Times they were already "assessing 1,000 inventions a year." They moved their manufacturing supply chain to Hong Kong in 1998.

The company scored another success in 1999, with Flix Trix Finger Bikes, a string of 1/2 inch replicas of BMX bikes. In 2003, the company made its first corporate acquisition buying Bounce ‘Round, a company that created scaled down versions of the inflatable bouncy castles. Over the next handful of years, Spin Master opened offices in the United States, Japan and Western Europe.

In 2003, Spin Master began marketing and distributing Pilot's Aquadoodle drawing toy for children with disappearing hydrochromic ink, which later won the American Toy of the Year award.

In 2008, Spin Master launched the Bakugan Battle Brawlers franchise, a card game developed in conjunction with Sega Toys, featured plastic balls which burst open to reveal anime-style characters. The toyline was supported by an animated action-adventure television series co-produced with TMS Entertainment, Japan Vistec, Nelvana and other partners, under the direction of Mitsuo Hashimoto. Bakugan reached almost $1 billion in yearly sales. The launch marked the debut of Spin Master Entertainment, a new division intended to expand Spin Master properties into television and film.

In 2010, Spin Master began developing the Paw Patrol franchise, creating a toy brand and a TV show simultaneously. To date, Spin Master Entertainment has developed six television series with over 400 cumulative episodes. The company partnered with Mondo Media to launch the SpindoTV YouTube channel in 2015. It featured animated and live-action series, both standalone and tied to Spin Master toylines. In 2019, Abby Hatcher, an animated preschool series debuted on Nickelodeon on January 1, 2019, in the U.S. The show centers on Abby and her new friends the Fuzzlies, who are amazing and quirky creatures that live in her family's hotel. Together with her best Fuzzly friend Bozzly, Abby goes on wild adventures to fix Fuzzly mishaps and help them in any way she can. In 2020, Spin Master launched its first direct to Netflix series, Mighty Express. The show follows a team of trains and their kid best-buddies as they keep things moving and get the delivery through no matter what the trouble -one thrilling adventure after another.

In August 2013, Spin Master acquired the Erector Set by Meccano construction set line. In June 2015, Spin Master entered into an agreement to acquire Cardinal Industries, a 60-year-old game and puzzles company. The purchase made Spin Master the second largest games company in the United States. A month after announcing it was buying Cardinal, Spin Master made its initial public offering on the Toronto Stock Exchange.

In January 2016, Spin Master purchased the library of board games owned by Editrice Giochi, one of the oldest privately held toy game companies in Italy. In February 2016, Spin Master bought the Etch A Sketch and Doodle Sketch brands from The Ohio Art Company for an undisclosed price. In April 2016, Spin Master purchased digital toy makers Toca Boca and Sago Mini from the Bonnier Group of Sweden. In August 2016, Spin Master diversified into the water and outdoor sports category through the acquisition of Swimways corporation.

In 2017, Spin Master acquired Marbles, a firm known for creating games, gifts and gadgets and the maker of Otrio; Aerobie, a leading producer of outdoor flying disks and sports toys; and Perplexus, a 3D ball-in-a-maze Spin Master had been distributing since 2013.

In March 2018, Spin Master acquired the 120 year old stuffed toy brand Gund. In December of that year, Spin Master was announced as the new toy licensee of the DC Entertainment starting in spring 2020, having acquired the license from Mattel. Spin Master is now a $1.5 billion (sales) company, which employs over 1,600 people in 16 countries. At the end of 2019, Spin Master completed the acquisition of the award-winning Orbeez brand from Maya Toys, complementing its growing Activities segment. Also in 2019 Spin Master started a ten-year toy licensing contract with Monster Jam ending a previous toy licensing deal between Monster Jam and Mattel who marketed it Monster Jam toys under the Hot Wheels line.

In February 2020, Spin Master announced the theatrical release of the Paw Patrol movie, a Spin Master Entertainment production in association with Nickelodeon Movies and distributed by Paramount Pictures. Paw Patrol: The Movie released in theatres on August 20, 2021, grossing $142 million worldwide. Following the success of its first theatrical film for the franchise, Spin Master announced that production had begun on a sequel, Paw Patrol: The Mighty Movie slated to release on September 29, 2023. On 27 October 2020, Spin Master said it will pay $50 million for Rubik's Cube, the iconic game invented nearly 50 years ago. The acquisition was completed on 5 January 2021. At the end of 2020, Spin Master announced executive leadership changes appointing Max Rangel as Global President effective January 2021, assuming the position of Global President and CEO in April 2021. In February 2022, Spin Master announced it renewed its licensing agreement with Warner Bros. Consumer Products to continue manufacturing DC Universe toys through 2026.

In 2021, Spin Master launched the Future of Play Scholarship committing to invest $100,000 in financial aid annually to the education and mentorship of underrepresented individuals. On October 19, 2021, Spin Master established Spin Master Ventures, a $100 million venture fund to back up games, toys and entertainment startups with investments made in Nordlight, a game development company in Stockholm and Hoot Reading, an online tutoring service that provides reading lessons to children. By the end of 2021, Spin Master had grown to a global children's entertainment company, employing over 2,000 people in 28 offices around the world.

On October 11, 2023, Spin Master announced an agreement to acquire toy company Melissa & Doug from AEA Investors for $950 million in cash. The acquisition was completed on January 2, 2024.

In 2019, Spin Master was named global master toy partner for DreamWorks to manufacture toys related to the animated series, Gabby's Dollhouse, a partnership that was renewed in 2025.

== List of manufactured toys ==
- Air Hogs
- Angry Birds
- Bakugan Battle Brawlers
- Bella Dancerella (2005-2007)
- Bunchems
- Cars 2
- DC Universe (2020-present; current contract expires in 2026)
- Etch A Sketch (2016–present)
- Fuggler
- Gabby's Dollhouse
- Harry Potter (2021-present)
- Hatchimals
- How to Train Your Dragon
- Kinetic Sand
- Little Charmers (2015-2017)
- Masha and the Bear
- Meccano
- Mermaid High
- Minecraft
- Monster Jam (2019-present; current contract expires in 2029)
- Monsuno (2012-2015)
- NASCAR (2011-2015)
- Orbeez
- Paw Patrol (2013–present)
- Peppa Pig (2010-2013, moved to Fisher-Price until they moved to Hasbro)
- PJ Masks (2015-2018, moved to Hasbro)
- Pirates of the Caribbean
- PlayStation: The Shapes Collection
- Rusty Rivets (2016–2018)
- Sick Bricks
- Star Wars
- Teenage Mutant Ninja Turtles
- The Powerpuff Girls
- The Wiggles (2003-2006)
- Tron: Legacy
- Twisty Petz
- ZhuZhu Pets

== Divisions ==
=== Spin Master Games ===
Spin Master Games is the board game division of the company. Spin Master also owns Cardinal Industries, Marbles and Editrice Giochi board and card game publishers. Spin Master Games publishes titles such as:

- Boom Boom Balloon – Winner of 2014 "Game of the Year" from the Toy Industry Association Push sticks from an outside frame into a balloon until it pops. The loser is determined by who pops the balloon.
- Quick Cups – A fast-paced pattern game. A card is flipped over; the player's job is to match the colored pattern with 5 colored cups as quickly as possible.
- Hedbanz – An interactive game where players try to guess the card on their head by asking yes–no questions. Variations include Act Up with charades-style play, Disney Hedbanz with licensed Disney characters included, and Hedbanz for Adults - a more difficult version of Hedbanz.
- Paw Patrol Adventure Game – A preschool game based on licensed Paw Patrol characters.
- Perplexus – A one-player 3D labyrinth inside a clear sphere.
- Beat the Parents – A kids vs. parents trivia game in which teams answer questions about the opposite generation. Available in board game and card game versions.
- Quelf – A completely random game where players pick cards and follow them to move ahead. The cards range from answering crazy questions to performing ridiculous stunts.
- Battle of the Sexes – A male vs. female trivia game in which teams answer gender-defining questions about the opposite sex.
- Heads Up! – A party game where players try to guess as many words on their heads as they can before a minute runs out. Other players assist by shouting clues to help the player score as many cards as possible.
- Soggy Doggy - Winner of 2018 “Game of the Year” from the Toy Industry Association. Players move around the board and take turns bathing the pup. The first player to make it around the board without getting wet wins.
- Upwords - A high-stacking word game where players place tile letters onto the game board to create new words.
- Bellz! - A strategy game where players must pick up their corresponding bell colors using a magnetic wand.
- H5 Domino Creations - Designed in collaboration with domino artist Lily Hevesh. The set includes 100 dominoes.
- Santorini - A strategic family board game where players build, block and climb their way to the top of a building. There is also a spin-off game called Santorini: New York.
- Disney Sidekicks - A cooperative strategy game where players work together as Disney-themed sidekicks to defeat the Disney villains and save the heroes.
- Tell Me Without Telling Me - A party game for adults where teams must beat each other to be the fastest to guess the words on the cards.
- Dumb Ways to Die Card Game - A card game based on the 2012 viral video of the same name, where players take turns rolling the dice to determine how many actions they need to complete while playing and drawing cards. The last person to have one or more beans alive wins.

=== Spin Master Entertainment ===
Alongside the company's toy and board game businesses, they are the company behind several successful kids' media franchises:

==== Television ====
Title	Release date	Network	Notes
Bakugan Battle Brawlers	February 24, 2008 – January 26, 2012	Teletoon; TV Tokyo (Japan); Cartoon Network (United States)	co-production with Sega Toys, Sega, TMS Entertainment and Nelvana
Redakai: Conquer the Kairu	July 9, 2011 – December 23, 2013	YTV; Cartoon Network (United States); Canal J/Gulli (France)	co-production with Marathon Media; Rights held by Banijay Kids & Family Distribution
Paw Patrol	August 12, 2013 – present	TVOKids; Nickelodeon (United States)	co-production with Guru Studio
Tenkai Knights	August 24, 2013 – December 6, 2014	Teletoon; Cartoon Network (United States); TV Tokyo (Japan)	co-production with Shogakukan-Shueisha Productions and Bones
Little Charmers	January 12, 2015 – April 15, 2017	Treehouse TV; Nickelodeon (United States)	co-production with Nelvana and Atomic Cartoons
Rusty Rivets	November 8, 2016 – May 8, 2020	Treehouse TV; Nickelodeon/Nick Jr. Channel (United States)	co-production with Jam Filled Toronto
Hatchimals	December 1, 2017 - March 26, 2018	YouTube	co-production with Smiley Guy Studios
Super Dinosaur	September 8, 2018 – January 26, 2019	Teletoon; Amazon Prime Video (United States)	co-production with Skybound Entertainment and Atomic Cartoons
Hatchimals: Adventures in Hatchtopia	November 5, 2018 – November 1, 2019	YouTube	co-production with Kickstart Entertainment
Bakugan: Battle Planet	December 23, 2018 – March 1, 2023	Teletoon/YTV; Cartoon Network/Netflix (United States); TV Tokyo (Japan)	co-production with TMS Entertainment, Nelvana and Man of Action Entertainment; First revival of the Bakugan franchise
Abby Hatcher	January 1, 2019 – April 2, 2022	TVOKids; Nickelodeon (United States)	co-production with Guru Studio
Dragamonz	September 23, 2019	YouTube	co-production with Studio Mochi
Toca Life Stories	February 29, 2020	YouTube	co-production with Pipeline Studios
Zo Zo Zombie	March 19, 2020	YouTube	co-production with Shogakukan-Shueisha Productions and J.C.Staff
Mighty Express	September 22, 2020 – August 29, 2022	Netflix	co-production with Atomic Cartoons
Sago Mini Friends	September 16, 2022 – November 22, 2024	Apple TV+	co-production with Brown Bag Films
Rubble & Crew	February 3, 2023 – present	Treehouse TV; Nickelodeon (United States)	co-production with Jam Filled Toronto; Spin-off of PAW Patrol
Bakugan	September 1, 2023 – January 8, 2024	Netflix	co-production with TMS Entertainment; Second revival of the Bakugan franchise
Vida the Vet	October 14, 2023 – present	Treehouse TV; CBeebies (United Kingdom)	co-production with Jam Filled Toronto
Unicorn Academy	November 2, 2023 – present	Netflix	co-production with Mainframe Studios
Punirunes	December 3, 2024 – February 6, 2025	YouTube; TV Tokyo (Japan)	International distribution-only, originally produced by Takara Tomy and OLM
Sparkles Magical Market	September 12, 2025 – present	YouTube	co-production with The Monk Studios

==== Films ====
Title	Release date	Notes
Paw Patrol: The Movie	August 20, 2021	distributed by Elevation Pictures in Canada, globally by Paramount Pictures; produced with Nickelodeon Movies
Paw Patrol: The Mighty Movie	September 29, 2023	distributed by Elevation Pictures in Canada, globally by Paramount Pictures; produced with Nickelodeon Movies
Paw Patrol: The Dino Movie	August 14, 2026	distributed by Elevation Pictures in Canada, globally by Paramount Pictures; produced with Paramount Animation and Nickelodeon Movies
Upcoming
Untitled David Soren film	2029	
Untitled fourth Paw Patrol film	2029	distributed by Elevation Pictures in Canada, globally by Paramount Pictures; produced with Paramount Animation and Nickelodeon Movies
Untitled Bakugan live-action film	TBA	co-production with ASAP Entertainment

=== Spin Master Digital Games ===
In 2012, Spin Master launched its first digital gaming app for Tech Deck. Other successful apps connected to the company's entertainment and toy Intellectual properties followed and, in 2016, Spin Master expanded its offering in the digital space with the acquisition of global mobile and digital app brands Toca Boca and Sago Mini. Spin Master Digital Games' most popular titles include:

- Toca Life: World - The iPhone App of the Year in 2021; a free virtual world app that combines the apps from the "Toca Life" series into one and allows children to "enjoy open-ended imaginative digital play."
- Sago Mini World - A subscription app containing over 35 games designed for users aged 2–6 years, including features based on building and creating with imagination and curiosity.
- Sago Mini School - A preschool-targeted app that attempts to help young children build maths, literacy, science and spacial skills through learning games.

== See also ==
- List of game manufacturers
- Fisher-Price
- Bandai
- Hasbro
- LEGO
- Mattel
- MGA Entertainment
- TOMY
