= Rubble & Crew =

Canadian animated television series

- Genre: Action-adventure; Comedy; Edutainment
- Based on: Paw Patrol by Keith Chapman
- Developed by: Bradley Zweig
- Directed by: Dianna Basso (seasons 1–3; season 4 production eps. 1–2); Jamie Leclaire (season 2; production eps. 1–12); Trevor Hierons (season 2; production eps. 13–22); Chris Roy (season 2; production eps. 23–26; season 3–present); Patrice Bérubé (season 3; production eps. 5B–13; season 4–present)
- Voices of: Luxton Handspiker; Lucien Duncan Reid; Alessandro Pugiotto; Shazdeh Kapedia; Alberta Bolan; Nova McKay; Liam McKenna; Nylan Parthipan; Keon McRae; Sabrina Jalees; Lisa Norton; Martin Roach; Cory Doran
- Country of origin: Canada
- Original language: English
- No. of seasons: 6
- No. of episodes: 89 (list of episodes)

Production
- Executive producers: Jennifer Dodge; Ronnen Harary; Laura Clunie; Toni Stevens
- Running time: 22–23 minutes (11–12 minutes per segment)
- Production companies: Spin Master Entertainment; Nickelodeon Productions

Original release
- Network: Nickelodeon (United States); Treehouse TV (Canada, seasons 1–5); Knowledge Kids (Canada, seasons 5-6)
- Release: February 3, 2023 – present

Related
- Paw Patrol

Rubble & Crew is a Canadian animated television series and a spin-off of Paw Patrol. It is produced by Spin Master Entertainment, with animation provided by Jam Filled Entertainment.

Rubble & Crew's first episode was released on the series' official YouTube channel on January 9, 2023, followed by its premiere on Nickelodeon in the United States on February 3 of that year. Unlike the original series, which airs on TVOntario in Canada, the first four-and-a-half seasons of Rubble & Crew aired on Treehouse TV and StackTV; both services are owned by Corus Entertainment. On September 12, 2026, the fifth and upcoming sixth seasons of the show moved to Knowledge Kids - with the season later airing on Treehouse on October 1 of the same year and being burned off on Netflix and Paramount+ on October 2 - due to Corus' financial restructurings.

== Plot ==
While attending his family reunion in Adventure Bay, Rubble is called to the neighboring town of Builder Cove by Mayor Goodway's sister Mayor Greatway to help in its construction projects. After building a bridge to Builder Cove, Rubble suggests that his family move to Builder Cove where they establish a construction company called Rubble & Crew that operates out of the Bark Yard. Rubble & Crew helps to expand Builder Cove by repairing buildings and making new ones for various different proprietors while contending with a rival construction worker named Speed Meister. When a construction work is done, Rubble & Crew celebrate their success by doing the "Wiggle and Wag" dance.

Rubble & Crew also have personal songs like "We're a Pup Family" and "Bounce and Build".

The "Big Builds" sub-series has Rubble & Crew operating larger construction vehicles when working on larger projects. They must also contend with Speed Meister's brother Mega Meister.

The "Demolishes" sub-series has Rubble & Crew operating demolition vehicles when working on demolition projects.

== Episodes ==
Season	Segments	Episodes	Originally released	
Season	Segments	Episodes	First released	Last released
1	49	26	January 29, 2023	March 5, 2024
2	49	26	March 6, 2024	March 18, 2025
3	23	13	March 19, 2025	December 11, 2025
4	25	13	October 10, 2025	May 7, 2026
5	23	13	May 11, 2026	TBA
6	TBA	13	October 12, 2026	TBA

== Characters ==
=== Rubble & Crew ===
==== Primary members ====
- Rubble (voiced by Luxton Handspiker in season 1 to mid-season 3, Lucien Duncan Reid in mid-season 3 onwards) is an English Bulldog and a member of the Paw Patrol who becomes the founder and the leader of Rubble & Crew. He drives around in a bulldozer with an excavator arm. Like in the Paw Patrol series, he is also an expert DJ and makes use of his catchphrase "Rubble on the double". Duncan-Reid reprised his role from the original series partway through the third season, after having initially been replaced by Handspiker, who previously voiced Rex in the Dino Rescue subseries.
- Mix (voiced by Shazdeh Kapadia) is an English Bulldog and one of Rubble's cousins. She handles mixing things that are associated with construction like concrete, paint, cement, and glue. Mix drives around in a cement truck with a hose that can be customized with paint, cement, concrete, bubbly soap, water, asphalt, rubber, and sparkles.
- Charger (voiced by Alessandro Pugiotto) is a French Bulldog and one of Rubble's cousins. He handles the heavy lifting for construction projects. Charger sports a prosthetic left back leg and drives around in a crane with a golden winch and stabilizers for heavy loads. Charger tends to get Zoom-Zoom-Zoomies when filled with excitement, causing everyone to give him room for it as he runs very fast.
- Wheeler (voiced by Liam McKenna in season 1, Nylan Parthipan in seasons 2 to 5, Keon McRae in season 6) is a Pointer and one of Rubble's cousins. He is a clean freak and handles everything involving nuts and bolts. He drives around in a dump truck with a flatbed trailer that he uses to carry dug-up dirt and different construction supplies with retractable street sweeper parts for cleaning jobs.

==== Secondary members ====
- Motor (voiced by Alberta Bolan in season 1, Nova McKay in season 2 onwards) is a Ca de Bou who is Rubble's youngest cousin and the youngest member of Rubble & Crew. She operates and handles the smashing needed for construction projects as well as the occasional paving projects. Because of her age, Motor speaks in the third person. She drives around in a vehicle that is a hybrid of a wrecking ball crane and a steamroller.
- Auntie Crane (voiced by Sabrina Jalees in seasons 1 and 2, Lisa Norton in season 3 onward) is a Continental Bulldog who is Rubble and his cousins' aunt and Motor's mother. She operates the supply warehouse in the Bark Yard and drives around in a forklift. Auntie Crane is also an expert at skateboarding. In season 3, Auntie Crane also operates the Bark Yard Zoomer, a new vehicle that brings the Bark Yard on the go.
- Grandpa Gravel (voiced by Martin Roach) is a Serrano Bulldog who is Crane's father and the grandfather of Rubble and his cousins. He drives around in a food truck where he makes kibble for his family.

=== Supporting ===
- Mayor Greatway (voiced by Leslie Adlam) is the mayor of Builder Cove with a daredevil-like personality. She is the sister of Mayor Goodway who owns a motorcycle with a sidecar. The episode "The Crew Builds a Splash Park" reveals that she is a certified lifeguard.
  - Mr. Ducky Doo is Mayor Greatway's pet mallard who also has a daredevil-like personality.
- Omar (voiced by Deven Mack) is a man who is among the new people to move to Builder Cove with her family and works as its mail carrier. In "The Crew Builds a Post Office", Omar becomes the proprietor of Builder Cove's post office. In "The Crew Builds a Houseboat", Omar's family donates their garage to Rubble & Crew in order to build them a houseboat.
  - Juniper (voiced by Josette Jorge) is a crossing guard who is the wife of Omar and mother of Lucas and Lily.
  - Lucas (voiced by Housten Daghighi in season 1, Myles-Anthony Douglas in season 2, Isaiah Ball from season 3 onwards) is the son of Omar and Juniper and Lily's older brother.
  - Lily (voiced by Mikayla SwamiNathan) is the daughter of Omar and Juniper and Lucas' younger sister.
  - Romar (voiced by Deven Mack) is Omar's identical twin brother and the uncle of Lily and Lucas who is an expert drummer.
- Shopkeeper Shelley (voiced by Jonathan Langdon) is the proprietor of a bike shop in Builder Cove as well as a flower shop, a hair salon/spa for humans and pups, a sporting goods store, a cooking store, and a shoe store. His bike shop was expanded by Rubble & Crew so that he could sell more bicycles.
- Camila (voiced by Paloma Nunez) is a truck driver and delivery girl who delivers items in her truck to anywhere in Builder Cove. She is also a certified pilot when it comes to deliveries that are too big for a truck and also operates a boat for water-based deliveries and a train for train-based deliveries.
- Café Carl (voiced by Jonathan Tan) is an ice cream vendor who becomes the proprietor of an ice cream shop that Rubble & Crew built for him. He is also shown to have become a proprietor of multiple other food businesses in Builder Cove, including a cheese restaurant called Café Cheesy Pleasy, a popcorn café, a library/tea shop, a smoothie shop, a pizza parlor/pancake café, a fancy/drive-thru restaurant, and a pirate ship café. Carl's popcorn café is upgraded in "The Crew Builds a Popcorn-Cat Café" to accommodate the five kittens who he adopted.
  - Marble is one of Café Carl's adopted kittens.
- Grocer Gabriel (voiced by Andy Toth) is the proprietor of a grocery store who tends to sing some of his exclamations. He lives on the second floor of his grocery store.
- Sierra Sparkle (voiced by Michela Luci) is a pop music star and the daughter of Grocer Gabriel who lives with her mom a few towns over from Builder Cove. Charger is a big fan of hers. In "The Crew Builds a Sierra Sparkle Sign", Sierra moves in with her father. In "The Crew Builds Sierra Sparkle's Bedroom," it is revealed that she resides on the second floor of her father's grocery store and owns a teddy bear named Snuggly Sparkle.
- Farmer Zoe (voiced by Krystal Meadows) is a first-time farmer who moves to Builder Cove.
  - Truffles is Farmer Zoe's pet pig who Wheeler befriends.
  - Lenny, Benny, and Jenny are three chickens owned by Farmer Zoe.
  - Mooreen is a dancing brown cattle owned by Farmer Zoe.
  - Rosie (vocal effects provided by Ophira Calof) is a baby goat owned by Farmer Zoe that can bleat to any music.
- Hank Hammer (voiced by Drew Scott) is the television presenter of the renovation show Hank Hammer, House Helper.
- River (voiced by Cihang Ma) is a non-binary skateboarder who recently moved to Builder Cove with their family. They are an expert photographer who takes pictures using a camera phone.
- Park Ranger Rose (voiced by Ophira Calof) is a paraplegic yet energetic park ranger whose all-terrain wheelchair has special tires that enable her to move across the nature trails easily.
- Coach Karima (voiced by Ana Sani) is a sports coach who moved to Builder Cove and loves to play different games. She would later become Shopkeeper Shelley's partner in running a sporting goods store.
- Inspector Inez (voiced by Paloma Nunez) is a building inspector who conducts safety inspection checks. If the area passes inspection, she awards the construction crew with a golden star.
- Hadley Hartley (voiced by Scott Law) is the cousin of Farmer Zoe who has an allergy to farm animals. In "The Crew Builds a Hotel", Hadley comes to Builder Cove to visit Zoe and ends up helping Rubble & Crew to build a hotel. He later becomes the hotel manager of the hotel.
- Dr. Diwa (voiced by Cynthia Jimenez-Hicks) is a Filipino-American veterinarian who knows how to handle different animals from domesticated to wild. She later moves to Builder Cove after Rubble & Crew build her a veterinary clinic.
- Fire Captain Catáwi (voiced by John Wamsley) is a nature-loving Native American fire captain who runs the fire station upon moving to Builder Cove. While serious about his firefighting job, he does have a comical side.
- Dr. Mariana Magica (voiced by Heather Loreto) is a Mexican-American woman who works as both a magician and a doctor. Rubble & Crew build for her a magical doctor's office.

=== Antagonists ===
- Speed Meister (voiced by Cory Doran) is a semi-competent construction worker who becomes the rival of Rubble & Crew and uses the monster truck-like Speedy-Mobile as his mode of transportation which also possesses a Speedy-Copter form. He works fast and sort of safe with disastrous results enough that Rubble & Crew have to rectify each situation. He also tends to do some sabotage for him to come on top of other things and would apologize for his actions when he gets busted.
  - Mr. McTurtle (voiced by Cory Doran) is Speed Meister's pet turtle who mostly quotes "Yep-a-roozie" and other related words. Mr. McTurtle occasionally has playdates with Mr. Ducky Doo.
- Mega Meister (voiced by Cory Doran) is a construction worker and Speed Meister's older but shorter brother who uses a monster truck as his mode of transportation and appears in the "Big Builds" sub-series. He specializes in making big projects and claims to be more intelligent than Speed Meister. Though Mega Meister's construction builds also has disastrous results like Speed Meister's builds.
  - Mr. McHippo (voiced by Cory Doran) is Mega Meister's pet hippopotamus who mostly quotes "Hippo-doozie".

=== Returning characters ===
The following characters from the original PAW Patrol series make special return appearances in the spin-off.

- Ryder (voiced by Kai Harris) is the 10-year-old leader of the PAW Patrol who meets up with Rubble and meets his family at a family reunion in "The Crew Builds a Bridge".
- Mayor Goodway (voiced by Kim Roberts) is the Mayor of Adventure Bay and the sister of Mayor Greatway who calls Ryder as she needs her sister to enlist Rubble and his family as seen in "The Crew Builds a Bridge".
  - Chickaletta is Mayor Goodway's pet chicken who makes her debut in "The Crew Builds a Lighthouse".
- Marshall (voiced by Christian Corrao in season 1, Jesse Gervasi in season 5) is a clumsy but competent Dalmatian and a member of the PAW Patrol who serves as a firefighter dog. He makes his debut in "The Crew and Marshall Build a Fire Station" where he inspects the fire station that Rubble & Crew constructs. Marshall returns in "The Crew & Marshall Build a Fire Watch Tower" where he meets Fire Captain Catáwi and covers for him while he takes his day off. He helps Rubble & Crew build a recreation room on the fire station's second floor and also helps to build a fire lookout tower on top of the fire station.
- Cap'n Turbot (voiced by Ron Pardo) is a sea captain and marine biologist in Adventure Bay who is one of the PAW Patrol's closest friends and most frequent callers. He makes his debut in "The Crew Builds a Lighthouse" where he is enlisted by Rubble to transport Mayor Goodway and Chickaletta to Builder Cove from sea.
- Chase (voiced by Luke Dietz) is a German Shepherd who serves as a police pup and the second-in-command of the PAW Patrol. He makes his debut in "The Crew & Chase Are on the Case" where he enlist Rubble & Crew to become his detective helpers to find clues and retrieve the statue.
- Skye (voiced by Lilly Bartlam) is a 7-year-old Cockapoo who serves as an aviator rescue pup. She makes her debut in "The Crew & Skye Build a Mountain Lodge" where she is called in by Rubble & Crew and she comes from Adventure Bay in Builder Cove to help in their construction project and provide some aerial support, enlisting Mix with an air badge as an ace aviator.
- Santa Claus (voiced by David J. Dixon) is a Christmas figure who lives at North Pole with his reindeer and Christmas elves who Rubble helped once during his work with the PAW Patrol. He appears in "The Crew Makes Christmas Magical" where he enlists Rubble & Crew to help him make toys when the Christmas elves get full from the candy canes. Santa Claus sports the African-American design seen in the main series episode "A Jr. Patrollers' Christmas". Santa Claus later returns in "The Crew Builds a North Pole Village for Santa".
- Rocky (voiced by Jackson Reid) is a 6-year-old mixed-breed dog who serves as the recycling and fix-it pup. He makes his debut in "The Crew & Rocky Build a Bear Island", where he helps to build an artificial island for two black bears from recycled material made from Speed Meister's disastrous observation tower construction.
- Everest (voiced by Berkley Silverman) is an 8-year-old purple-hued Siberian Husky who serves as a mountain rescue pup. She made her debut in "The Crew & Everest Build a Snow Castle" where she came to judge the snow building contest then helps the crew to investigate of the creature Jumbo Paws.

== Production ==
A TV series was ordered by Nickelodeon after the success of Paw Patrol: The Movie and would focus on one of the main pups from the series. On March 24, 2022, it was announced that the spin-off series would focus on Rubble. On July 27, 2023, the series was renewed for a 26-episode second season. On March 4, 2025, the series was renewed for a third and fourth season, both 13 episodes. On May 14, 2026, the series was renewed for a fifth and sixth season, both 13 episodes. Starting in Season 5, new episodes in Canada moved to Knowledge Kids due to Corus' financial difficulties and the uncertain future of Treehouse - with episodes appearing on the Knowledge Kids site.

== Awards and nominations ==
Year	Award	Category	Nominee	Result	Ref.
2024	12th Canadian Screen Awards	Best Direction in an Animated Program or Series	Diana Basso and Joey So (for "The Crew and Chase Are on the Case")	Nominated	
2025	13th Canadian Screen Awards	Best Animated program or series	Rubble & Crew	Nominated	
2025	13th Canadian Screen Awards	Best Voice Performance	Cory Doran	Nominated	
2025	13th Canadian Screen Awards	Sound in an Animated Program or Series	Richard Spence-Thomas, Tim Muirhead, Kyle Peters, Bethany Masters, Luke Dante and Patton Rodrigues (for "The Crew Builds a Ballpark")	Nominated	
2025	13th Canadian Screen Awards	Best Directing, Animation	Joey So and Diana Basso (for "The Crew Builds a Ballpark")	Nominated	
2025	13th Canadian Screen Awards	Best Original Music, Animation	Graeme Cornies, Brian Pickett and James Chapple (for "The Crew Builds a Ballpark")	Nominated	
2025	13th Canadian Screen Awards	Canada Media Fund Kids' Choice	Rubble & Crew	Nominated	
