= Melissa & Doug =

American toy company

Melissa & Doug, LLC
- Formerly: Lights, Camera, Interaction!, Inc (1988–1998)
- Type: Subsidiary
- Industry: Toys
- Founded: August 1988; 38 years ago
- Founder: Melissa Bernstein; Doug Bernstein
- Headquarters: Wilton, Connecticut, United States
- Parent: Spin Master (2024–present)
- Website: melissaanddoug.com

Melissa & Doug, LLC (formerly Lights, Camera, Interaction!, Inc.) is an American manufacturer of children's toys, including wooden puzzles, arts & crafts products, plush toys, and other educational toys; a subsidiary of Spin Master since 2024. The company was founded in 1988 by Melissa and Doug Bernstein in their basement and Doug's parents' garage. All products are designed at its Wilton, Connecticut, headquarters.

The company has factories in the U.S. and abroad with about 1,000 employees worldwide, including some in China and India.

== History ==
The private company was founded in August 1988 when Melissa and Doug Bernstein left corporate careers to start their own company.

Melissa and Doug made three short films for home video under the "Lights, Camera, Interaction!" banner and the name "Special Friends", all of these films starring 8-year-old Brett Ambler: "You On Kazoo!" (1989), which promoted a Kazoo toy; "Let's Sing-Along" (1990), which promoted a microphone toy; and "Ring-Along, Sing-Along" (1991), promoting a bell-ringing toy. The videotapes were marketed directly to small, independent toy stores but did not sell well. However, these three short films would become famous in the mid-2010s, when "You on Kazoo!" was uploaded to YouTube and became a viral meme, thanks to the kazoo scenes, and "The Kazoo Kid" would later become the official nickname for Ambler. Specifically when Ambler says in "You On Kazoo!", "Wait a minute, who are you?"

The first product that brought them attention was the Fuzzy Farm Puzzle, a wooden puzzle with texture. An extensive line of wooden puzzles followed. In the late 1990s, the company expanded into wooden toys, arts & crafts, pretend play, plush toys, and more.

In 2010, private equity firm Berkshire Partners became an owner of Melissa & Doug. The company was fined $1,386 on November 15, 2012, by the U.S. Immigration and Customs Enforcement for hiring unlawful employees.

In 2016, Melissa Bernstein told Good Morning America that imaginary play helps children explore, create, take risks, and discover who they are. The show reported that the company has made more than 5,000 products.

On October 11, 2023, six years after AEA Investors acquired the company, Spin Master Corp. announced an agreement to acquire Melissa & Doug for $950 million in cash. On January 2, 2024, it was reported that the purchase had been completed.

The company opened its first brick and mortar toy store in 2024 at The Westchester shopping mall in White Plains, New York.

=== Philanthropy ===
The company sponsors an entrepreneurship program at Duke University, Melissa's alma mater, providing funding and mentors throughout the year. Melissa and Doug Bernstein help students in the program. Melissa and Doug have also endowed a leadership program for students at the University of Connecticut, Doug's alma mater.
