= Redakai: Conquer the Kairu =

French-Canadian animated series

- Season 1 logo
- Also known as: Redakai: Lokar's Shadow (season 2); Redakai
- Genre: Action; Adventure; Science fantasy Comedy-drama
- Created by: Vincent Chalvon-Demersay; David Michel
- Directed by: Yeon Sang-ho (39 episodes); Olivier Jongerlynck (24 episodes); Stephane Berry (16 episodes)
- Composers: Paul Etienne Cote; Maxime Barzel
- Countries of origin: France; Canada
- Original languages: French; English
- No. of seasons: 2
- No. of episodes: 52 (list of episodes)

Production
- Executive producers: Vincent Chalvon-Demersay; David Michel; Ronnen Harary; Matthew Wexler; Jennifer Dodge
- Producers: Vincent Chalvon-Demersay; David Michel; Jennifer Dodge; Susane Belec (season 2)
- Editor: Martin Tremblay
- Running time: 22 minutes
- Production companies: Spin Master Entertainment; Marathon Media

Original release
- Network: Canal J/Gulli (France); YTV (Canada); Cartoon Network (USA)
- Release: July 9, 2011 – December 23, 2013

Redakai: Conquer the Kairu (also known simply as Redakai and alternatively known as Redakai: Lokar's Shadow for the second season) is an animated series that premiered on YTV in Canada on July 9, 2011, on Cartoon Network in the United States on July 16, 2011 and on Canal J and Gulli in France on October 22, 2011. The series was created by Vincent Chalvon-Demersay and David Michel and was co-produced by Canada's Spin Master Entertainment and France's Zodiak Kids/Marathon Media in association with Canal J and Gulli. Like Totally Spies! and Martin Mystery, which were also produced by Marathon, the show's animation style was influenced by anime.

== Premise ==
The series revolves around Ky, a 15-year-old student of ancient martial arts, who embarks on an epic quest to find the Kairu, a primordial alien energy source. Aided by his friends Maya and Boomer, Ky travels the world searching for the Kairu while attempting to make sure that his extraterrestrial teenage alien adversaries don't find it first.

== Characters ==
Type	Character name	French voice actor	English voice actor	Ref(s)
Main	Ky Stax	Donald Reignoux	Austin Di Iulio	
Main	Maya	Marie Nonnenmacher	Jasmine Richards	
Main	Boomer	Bruno Meyère	Dan Petronijevic	
Allies	Master Boaddai	Frederic Souterelle; Martin Hylander Brucker	Dwayne Hill	
Allies	Connor Stax	Marc Bretonnière		
Allies	Mookee	Vincent de Boüard	Cory Doran	
Allies	Master Quantus		Wil Wheaton	
Villain	Lokar	Marc Bretonnière	Jamie Watson	
Team Radikor	Zane	Tony Marot	Lyon Smith	
Team Radikor	Zair	Caroline Mozzone	Katie Griffin	
Team Radikor	Techris		Jeff Margolis	
Team Imperiaz	Princess Diara	Jessie Lambotte	Tegan Moss	
Team Imperiaz	Koz		Jeff Margolis	
Team Imperiaz	Teeny	Jessie Lambotte	Athena Karkanis	
Team Battacor	Zylus	Tony Marot	Jason Barr; Jeff Margolis	
Team Battacor	Rynoh	Stéphane Miquel	Cory Doran	
Team Battacor	Bash		Dan Petronijevic	

== Episodes ==
=== Season 1: Conquer the Kairu (2011–2012) ===
No. overall	No. in season	Title	Original release date	Prod. code
1	1	"The Fist of the Colossus"	July 9, 2011	101
Teens Ky, Maya and Boomer track down an ancient artifact in the South Pacific. In the B-story, Boomer gets a big pimple on his forehead, causing one of the slaves to mistake him for a three-eyed god that they worship. Together Team Stax must defeat the evil-like warriors who are using slaves to do their jobs. Team Stax then find the Fist of Colossus which is filled with Kairu Energy and have to defeat the warriors to collect it before it's too late.
2	2	"Maya Goes Bad"	July 9, 2011	102
When Maya is hit with an attack called "Lokar's Shadow," she finds herself drawn to the side of evil, she then joins team Radacor, Lokar is most pleased and immediately sends them to hunt down a Kairu Relec in a Pyramid. In the B-story, Mookee gets a long beard after being nervous about Maya being bad, he tries many times to cut it off and stop worrying but he can't and his beard grows and grows.
3	3	"The Kairu Diary"	July 16, 2011	103
Ky locates his dad's X-Reader and tries to find it. Note: This is the first appearance of Golden Metanoid. (You will see him more at the end of the series.)
4	4	"The Cataclysm Stone"	July 23, 2011	104
Ky and the gang try to destroy the Cataclysm Stone before all of the Kairu energy in the universe is sucked in.
5	5	"The Valley of the Banyan"	July 30, 2011	105
Mookee saves Team Stax from an ice attack and becomes a warrior-in-training, but finds out that being a Kairu warrior isn't all it's cracked up to be.
6	6	"The Guardian of the Souls"	August 6, 2011	106
Ky falls prey to a mind clouding attack, thus suspending him from Team Stax and leaving Maya and Boomer against a guardian.
7	7	"The Kairu That Time Forgot"	August 13, 2011	107
Ky, Maya and Boomer travel to the rainforest and are shocked to discover that they must retrieve Kairu from a reanimated pterodactyl.
8	8	"The Mask of Fire"	August 27, 2011	108
Ky and Maya must save Boomer, as well as Team Imperiaz members, before a volcano erupts, destroying not only a mask containing Kairu energy, but also the island they are all on.
9	9	"Neptune's Reef"	September 3, 2011	109
The gang heads to the Mediterranean in search of Kairu – and find it in an ancient statue of Neptune under the sea.
10	10	"The Chalice"	September 24, 2011	110
Team Stax befriends a king who unknowingly has a Kairu-infused relic and must help him defend his castle from the Imperiaz.
11	11	"Black Kairu Gold Metanoid"	September 10, 2011	111
When Lokar unleashes Black Kairu – an evil form of the energy that renders Boaddai powerless – Team Stax must go to Lokar's lair to save their master.
12	12	"Tournament of Champions"	October 1, 2011	112
Ky, Zane, Zylus, and Diara compete in a Kairu tournament, each representing their team.
13	13	"Kairu Showdown"	October 8, 2011	113
Zane and Ky have a Kairu Showdown after Zane uses an attack that makes him look like Ky.
14	14	"Battacor Blood"	October 15, 2011	114
When the Battacor steal the X-Scaper and head to Norway in an attempt to beat Team Stax to a Kairu relic, the team must go to extreme measures to get the ship back.
15	15	"Farm Boy Boomer"	October 22, 2011	115
The team learns that there is a Kairu deposit on Boomer's family farm; Boomer lies to his parents saying he is the leader of Team Stax.
16	16	"The Kairu Vessel"	November 5, 2011	116
Team Stax finds the remains of Ky's fathers' ship. Since it is filled with Kairu energy, the Imperiaz also want it.
17	17	"The Return of Connor Stax"	November 12, 2011	117
Connor Stax was saved from an ice trap from Nanuk and explains that he can't see his son yet due to certain events. Team Battacor and team Stax fight for a Kairu relic and try to save Nanuk's village.
18	18	"The Island"	November 26, 2011	118
Team Stax crashes on a mysterious island that has strange effects on Kairu attacks.
19	19	"Kairu Visions"	December 10, 2011	119
Maya has a new power to see the future, but can't always seem to predict the truth.
20	20	"The Redakai"	February 4, 2012	120
During a meeting of the Redakai, Lokar plans to attack the Monastery in order to get rid of the Redakai Council.
21	21	"The Gauntlet of Lokar"	January 21, 2012	121
Zane finds a new relic which gives him incredible power and it's up to Team Stax – and surprisingly Zair – to get it back from him.
22	22	"Green with Infinita Envy"	February 11, 2012	122
Maya receives a new X-Drive and questions how she arrived at the Monastery, as well as who her real parents are.
23	23	"The New Warrior"	January 28, 2012	123
Team Stax meets a new Kairu warrior, Ekayon, while out on a quest – and Ky is instantly suspicious of him.
24	24	"Dream Team E-Teens"	February 18, 2012	124
Ky, Maya and Boomer find themselves up against their most formidable foes yet... the leaders of each set of E-Teens who are working as one against them.
25	25	"Clash of the Kairu Warriors: Part I"	March 3, 2012	125
Team Stax, Team Radikor, Team Battacor, Team Imperiaz, and Ekayon enter a tournament to decide whether good or evil is truly better; Maya learns a shocking secret about her origins.
26	26	"Clash of the Kairu Warriors: Part II"	March 10, 2012	126
Maya and Ky battle in the finals, but none of them are on their best.

=== Season 2: Lokar's Shadow (2013) ===
No. overall	No. in season	Title	Original release date	Prod. code
27	1	"The Fall of Lokar"	January 4, 2013 (AU); January 11, 2013 (UK)	201
Team Stax travels to Lokar's Lair to stop him once and for all. But they run into trouble and destroy his lair. Lokar is nowhere to be found after this.
28	2	"The Rise of Zane"	January 11, 2013 (UK)	202
Team Radikor discovers that Lokar is missing. Zane comes to the conclusion that Lokar is gone forever. Meanwhile Team Stax meets Aldo in a village that is made in treetops. Team Stax discovers Zane has become more powerful.
29	3	"Arrival of the Hiverax"	January 12, 2013 (UK)	203
Team Stax are surprised to see a new team of E-Teens, three triplet brothers who are frightening: the Hiverax.
30	4	"Shadow Ekayon"	January 12, 2013 (UK)	204
Team Stax are sent to an island in search of Kairu. They discover not only their friend Ekayon but also harmful influences of Shadow Kairu.
31	5	"The Escape of the Imperiaz"	January 19, 2013 (UK)	205
Team Imperiaz discover where Lokar has hidden their parents. The only problem is, Zane now holds the key to their release.
32	6	"New Redakai, New Warriors"	January 19, 2013 (UK)	206
Team Stax meets three new warriors in training. Aprix, Gia and Balistar. The three go off on their own and meet up Team Radikor. Team Stax comes to their rescue.
33	7	"Discovery of the Kairu Cube"	January 20, 2013 (UK)	207
Team Stax discovers the Kairu Cube. They battle Team Hiverax for it. Ky is trying to control his Platinum Metanoid, but is struggling. However, Team Stax prevails in the end, taking home the Kairu Cube. Upon returning, Master Boaddai reveals that they have only found half of the cube, and that the other half is useless if it falls into the wrong hands.
34	8	"Return to Kieran's Castle"	January 20, 2013 (UK)	208
Team Stax travels back to Kieran's Castle. A possessed lion statue has been attacking Kieran. It is up to Team Stax to defeat it.
35	9	"Shadow of the Radikor"	January 26, 2013 (UK)	209
Team Radikor obtains new monsters and battle Team Stax.
36	10	"Vision of Catastrophe"	January 26, 2013 (UK)	210
Maya has a vision with Team Hiverax reporting to a strange figure that looks like Lokar. Could her vision be correct? Is Lokar still out there?
37	11	"Shadow of the Shadow"	January 26, 2013 (UK)	211
Team Stax is in the midst of their latest quest. But as they're about to snag the energy, they run into the Radikor, who challenge them to a battle, which they eventually win. Back at the monastery, just as Master Baoddai is about to show Team Tiro one of his inner Kairu/water-levitating moves, a shadowy energy reaches Baoddai and completely drains him of his energy causing him to fall to the ground helpless, the novice warriors were horrified. When Team Stax returns, there seems to be no one there. They eventually find Team Tiro hiding with a completely enervated Master Baoddai. Team Tiro can only tell Team Stax that they were attacked by an unseen force which drained Baoddai of his powers. Just then, Ky, Maya and Boomer come face to face with what's causing all of this – shadow Kairu in the form of a dark misty shadow that is consuming the entire monastery like it did to Baoddai, it seems bent on draining energy from anything in its path. In the end, Ky is able to use a combination attack (Platinum Fire Blade) to fight back the shadow Kairu. Then all six of the warriors use their X-Readers to suck up all of the shadow Kairu – saving the monastery and restoring Baoddai's powers.
38	12	"Boomer Goes Platinum"	January 26, 2013 (UK)	212
Boomer wins a Platinum Froztok. It helps Team Stax defeat Team Imperiaz, while helping the Bayouviens.
39	13	"Darkness Rises"	January 26, 2013 (UK)	213
Team Stax unknowingly locate Lokar's new lair. They discover that Lokar survived the explosion since his old lair was destroyed. They also find out that Team Hiverax works for Lokar. Team Hiverax find and kidnap Zane. They bring him to Lokar, where he takes back his X-Reader from Zane. At the end of the episode Team Hiverax abandon Zane in a blizzard.
40	14	"Tournament Of The Kairu Cube"	September 30, 2013 (Middle East)	214
Team Stax, the Hiverax, the Imperiaz, and the Raddacor (the other two members having rescued Zane from the blizzard) compete for the possession of the entire Kairu Cube. Whoever wins will receive the Cube, and may take a X-drive from any combatant. After Kai is defeated by Lokar, and a distracted Baoddai by Zane, the two face each other in the final. Zane attempts to rejoin Lokar, but is ruthlessly attacked and beaten by Lokar. Lokar takes on Baoddai's monster Palladium, a monster so powerful it is only used in extreme circumstances. Lokar leaves with the cube and the E-teams.
41	15	"Leviathan's Wrath"	October 7, 2013 (Middle East)	215
Radikor and Team Stax find that a squid that turned giant because of shadow Kairu attacked Nanook and Cayoosh's village.
42	16	"Plot of the Imperiez"	October 14, 2013 (Middle East)	216
In a battle which for a new Kairu deposit Team Stax won, Maya dropped her communicator in the midst of the battle and Diara got a hold of it. She faked Maya's voice and lured Team Tyro into their trap. The young team managed to send out a distress signal to Team Stax. The two teams met and battled for Team Tyro and a new Kairu deposit, Ky managed to replace the captured Team Tyro with fakes without Diara noticing and they also won the battle. When Diara brought the fakes to Lokar, he was furious.
43	17	"Kairu Feud"	October 21, 2013 (Middle East)	217
Team Stax find a village separated into two by a wall, one side is thriving due to good Kairu and the other side is in bad shape due to shadow Kairu in the land. The villagers from the dead side of the land is blaming the villagers from the thriving side of the land for the land's bad condition. Team Hiverax later arrives and battles for both sets of Kairu and lost. Team Stax collects both sets of the Kairu and life and peace returns to the village.
44	18	"When Dark Roots Take Hold"	October 28, 2013 (Middle East)	218
Lokar's shadow Kairu shows an image of Maya turning evil. In a battle with the Imperiez, Maya uses her shadow Kairu X-Drives to save Boomer and win but is affected by it. After being told by Ky to not use shadow Kairu anymore because of her character change when using it, she sneaks out and goes to Lokar to find out why shadow Kairu affects her and why she uses it so well. Maya meets Lokar and he gives her a lesson on how to control shadow Kairu and she should accept shadow Kairu. Discovering Maya has gone to Lokar, Ky and Boomer goes after her and sneaks into Lokar's base but got discovered when Boomer shouts to Maya, causing Lokar to summon the Imperiez. Maya then learns that Lokar traded a part of his soul to create shadow Kairu and she controls shadow Kairu well due to the shadow Kairu also having a part of her. In order to leave, Maya battles Lokar and wins by using shadow Kairu but nearly turns evil. She later saves Ky and Boomer from the Imperiez and returns with them. She decides to not use shadow Kairu again after seeing what it did to her during the battle with Lokar.
45	19	"Mookee's Mission"	November 4, 2013 (Middle East)	219
The Hiverax tricks Mookee into thinking that he has great powers and Zane has Palladium and plans to attack Baoddai. They give him a X-Reader to beat Zane so that they would become Lokar's number one team again. But their plan goes wrong when Mookee paralyzes Zane instead by accident and brings Zane back to the monastery to Baoddai. Mookee tells everyone what the Hiverax told him to do, causing them to wonder why the Hiverax did so. Then, Zane's paralysis wears off and challenges Team Stax to a battle so he could get revenge on Mookee, Zane's team arrives later. Seeing their plan has gone wrong, the Hiverax comes to beat Zane themselves. To beat Hiverax, Team Stax and Radikor teams up but got in a pinch. Mookee, feeling responsible saves Team Stax from falling of a bridge, and beats the Hiverax.
46	20	"The Two Faces of Ky Stax"	November 11, 2013 (Middle East)	220
After Maya obtains a Platinum Harrier, the Hiverax challenges them to test their new attack which splits Ky into two, one possessing the thinking ability but is too careful, the other possessing the courage but is reckless. Baoddai tries to combine the Kys back together but lacks the power. On the mission to retrieve a new Kairu deposit, the two Kys could not agree with each other due to their varying characters. Then, the Hiverax arrive and challenges them but the Kys fight against each other instead. When the Hiverax tries to split Maya and Boomer, Maya intercepts the attack with her own, causing the attack to land on the Kys, fusing them back together. With Platinum Harrier and Platinum Froztok, Team Stax beats the Hiverax.
47	21	"The Power of the Imperiez"	November 18, 2013 (Middle East)	221
After getting beat again by Team Stax and gotten reprimanded by Lokar, the Imperiez decides to steal the Kairu in the monastery in order to impress Lokar. By spying on the monastery, they saw Baoddai taking the newly collected Kairu to the vault at night and heads there after Baoddai left. They drained as much Kairu as they could, becoming super charged and got a lot of new attacks. When exiting the vault, Boomer saw them and alerted the team. Wanting to drain more Kairu with Team Stax's X-Readers, they challenged Team Stax and won. They took Team Stax's X-Readers and went to the vault and found the Kairu pot from the alien vessel, attempting to take it. The beaten team Stax got Mookee to steal Ky's X-Reader back and Ky helped get Maya and Boomer's back as well. By making the Imperiez indecisive on which new attack to use, Team Stax won.
48	22	"Elimination Island"	November 25, 2013 (Middle East)	222
The Hiverax lure the Radikor onto the electro-magnetic island with set Kairu in order to eliminate them. But, Team Stax also gets pulled onto the island. The Hiverax challenges both teams and due to the island's electro-magnetic field affecting Team Stax and Radikor's X-Readers, the Hiverax force them on a run throughout the island as the Hiverax's X-Readers work due to their modifications. On the run, they find the set Kairu and Ky uses it for an attack to temporarily short out the island's electro-magnetic field, allowing them to battle. But the field comes back up and the fallen Hiverax combines into Hydrax, forcing both teams to flee into the X-Scaper and hanks to Mookee's tuning of the ship's boosters, they escape the Hiverax and the island's electro-magnetic field.
49	23	"Battle of the Hiverax"	December 2, 2013 (Middle East)	223
The Hiverax battle team Stax but the Kairu deposit drops into the river and two of the Hiverax jumps into the river to go after it, leaving Hexus to deal with Team Stax. When Maya hit Hexus with an attack, he falls into a trans like state with his eyes glowing red. Team Stax bring him onto the X-Scaper in order for Master Baoddai to take a look.
50	24	"The Spreading of the Shadow"	December 9, 2013 (Middle East)	224
Ekayon will visit Team Stax and will help his friends to defeat Team Imperiaz and Team Radikor, but they will discover a scaring thing: the pure Kairu is turned into Shadow Kairu, because of a machine, created by Lokar. After they will return to the monastery, Ky will hear about a place, which contains the antidote for Shadow Kairu. So, he immediately goes to find it, but he doesn't know that Ekayon joined him.
51	25	"The End of the Shadow- Part 1"	December 16, 2013 (Middle East)	225
Ky and Ekayon will go together to find the Prism Kairu (the antidote) and will find a cave(where the Prism Kairu is). Maya and Boomer will search for them, but a new tournament will start (without Ky and Ekayon), because Team Hiverax took the Kairu Cube. Team Stax will battle Team Imperiaz, and Team Hiverax vs. Team Radikor. the winners are Team Stax and Team Radikor, but the Tournament is interrupted by Lokar.
52	26	"The End of the Shadow- Part 2"	December 23, 2013 (Middle east)	226
At the tournament, Lokar discovers that it is the Hiverax who have betrayed him. And though he'd like to take back the Kairu Cube and the X-Drive Palladion that is stored within it, the RedaKai say no. The tournament must go on. Furious, Lokar makes an example of the Hiverax – and "deactivates" them! Meanwhile, Ky and Ekayon step inside the cave… and find themselves face-to-face with a prism "guardian" creature. And with no other choice but to battle it, Ky and Ekayon enter the challenge of a lifetime! Back at the tournament, Maya and Boomer begin round two. And just when it looks like they're about to be eliminated by the Radikor, they both go Platinum -- and end up winning the day and Baoddai's monster! And when they give it to Baoddai and he returns to normal strength, we soon realize that Lokar is still determined to fight! So Baoddai challenges Lokar to a Master Showdown, fighting Lokar for the cube and for his monster, Drakilar! Back at the cave, Ky and Ekayon look like they're about to lose their battle, when Ky transforms into Platinum Metanoid... and leads himself and Ekayon to victory and the Prism Kairu! Ky pops the solid chunk of energy into the center of his monster's chest and feels its power! Meanwhile, Baoddai/Palladion ends up winning the epic battle against Lokar/Drakilar. But that doesn't stop Lokar. He uses his inner Kairu to put his machine into over-drive -- causing all the world's pure Kairu to begin being transformed into shadow Kairu! But before he can finish, Ky and Ekayon show up. Ky uses his newfound prism power to blast the shadow Kairu. And as Lokar disappears once again in a powerful blast of energy, the world's shadow Kairu is transformed back into pure Kairu and everything is right in the world once again! Later, back at the monastery, something unexpected happens -- when a spaceship that looks suspiciously like Mookee's crash-lands nearby!

== Broadcast ==
Following the show's US launch on Cartoon Network in July 2011, Zodiak Kids announced in September 2011 that they had pre-sold the pay rights to the series to Turner Broadcasting System Europe to air on their Cartoon Network channels in EMEA territories except in Spain and French-speaking areas.
