= Tickle Me Elmo =

Muppet character children's plush toy

- Type: Electronic plush toy
- Invented by: Ron Dubren; Greg Hyman
- Company: Tyco Toys
- Country: US, Canada, UK
- Availability: July 1996–present

Tickle Me Elmo is a children's plush toy from Tyco Preschool, a division of Tyco Toys, of the Muppet character Elmo from the children's television show Sesame Street. When squeezed, Elmo plays a giggle sound. When squeezed three times, Elmo shakes and vibrates.

The toy was first produced in the United States in 1996 and slowly became a fad, reaching its apex during the 1996 Christmas shopping season, with some instances of violence reported over the limited available supply. People reported that the toy, which retailed for $28.99 according to its MSRP, was being re-sold by scalpers in newspapers and on the Internet for up to $1,500 by the end of 1996.

== History ==
"Tickles The Chimp", the precursor to Tickle Me Elmo, was invented by Ron Dubren and Greg Hyman, a toy inventor who had invented Alphie the Robot (a children's learning computer) several years prior. They met with a representative from Tyco Toys, who was not interested in the monkey toy, but thought that the giggling technology would be a good fit for a toy based on Elmo, a character from The Muppets featured on Sesame Street. However, Tyco only had the license to produce plastic toys based on Sesame Street at the time, as rights for plush toys belonged to Hasbro, which were due to expire. The project thus began as Tickle Me Taz, a toy based on the Tasmanian Devil cartoon character from Looney Tunes, which Tyco did have the license for. After Tyco Toys won the license to produce plush toys based on Sesame Street, Dubren and Hyman pivoted to developing an Elmo toy, which would vibrate three times and say, "That Tickles!" when squeezed.

Tickle Me Elmo was released in July 1996, with a supply of 400,000 units. The dolls sold well and remained widely available in stores until the day after Thanksgiving, when they suddenly sold out. With the Christmas shopping season approaching, Tyco Preschool ordered 600,000 more dolls from their suppliers. Promotion was helped by Rosie O'Donnell, who had shown the toy on her TV show in early October, although peak demand and stock shortages did not occur until nearly two months later.

The scarcity of the new toy provoked a shopping frenzy. Two women were arrested in Chicago for fighting over the doll, while in New York City some people ran after delivery trucks hoping to get their hands on Elmo before it reached stores. Someone allegedly purchased a Tickle Me Elmo for $7,100 in Denver. KBIG in Los Angeles had a radio auction for charity December 20, 1996; Bob's Pharmacy won and purchased a Tickle-Me-Elmo for $18,500. Robert Waller, a clerk working at a Wal-Mart store in Fredericton, New Brunswick, Canada, was among those injured by "Elmo-mania". During a Midnight Madness sale on December 14, Robert was unpacking the latest shipment of Tickle Me Elmo, when he became uncomfortably aware of a crowd of about 300 people watching him carefully. He opened a box, pulled out an Elmo - and the crowd stampeded down the aisle. Trampled, he suffered "a pulled hamstring, injuries to his back, jaw and knee, a broken rib and a concussion".

By the end of December, the entire stock of one million "Tickle Me Elmo" toys had been sold.

== Other "Tickle Me" products ==
In early 1997, Tyco released new "Tickle Me" toys based on other characters from Sesame Street – first Tickle Me Ernie and Tickle Me Big Bird, then Tickle Me Cookie Monster – but despite good sales, none of these toys achieved as much fame as Tickle Me Elmo.

The Tickle Me Elmo Surprise, released in late 2001, was an elaborate contest. In its normal play mode, the player would have to find which spot on Elmo's body would make him laugh, using clues like "Elmo isn't ticklish there" and "Elmo's just a little ticklish there". These versions of the dolls came with an inbuilt real-time clock and would stop its normal play mode on January 9, 2002. Five of the dolls were programmed to deliver a message on this date that the owner had won a prize. The grand prize was US$200,000; other prizes included cars, computers, Power Wheels, and other Fisher-Price products.

=== TMX (2006–2007) ===
For the tenth anniversary of Tickle Me Elmo, Fisher-Price released a new Elmo doll in 2006 called TMX, meaning "Tickle Me (Elmo) Ten" or "Tickle Me Xtreme". The toy, which was designed by Bruce Lund of Lund and Co. Invention (River Forest, Illinois), was first announced at the American International Toy Fair. Rather than simply vibrating like the original, the TMX rolls around on the floor, laughing and smashing his fist on the ground, begging for the tickler to stop.

The full look of the doll was not revealed until it debuted live on ABC's Good Morning America and arrived on store shelves on September 19, 2006. Toy experts said that the delay was unprecedented, with only a few people in the media allowed to preview the product, and only after signing confidentiality agreements. The packaging was designed so that the doll could not be seen without purchasing it. The box includes a preview flap, but upon opening, only the doll's eyes are visible. It requires six AA batteries and costs approximately $40. In a promotional clip, Jim Silver, co-publisher of Toy Wishes magazine said, "The first reaction I had was, 'Where are the wires?' Because I didn't think anything like that could move on its own."

Toy analyst Chris Byrne told USA Today, "This is a quantum leap forward, another breakthrough in the preschool plush category." Byrne believed sales would be high, but the reaction would not be as unprecedented. "The culture has moved beyond that, the whole hot-toy phenomenon." He cited the fact there has not been such a craze since Furby in 1998. Toys "R" Us stores and Amazon had a pre-sale program for the doll, the first included elaborate in-store displays with a digital countdown to the doll's launch. Amazon took more presale orders than it could fulfill. As with the original Tickle Me Elmo doll, demand for the new toy gave rise to some extreme acts. One person in Tampa, Florida was allegedly threatened with a gun to hand over a TMX toy. This was parodied on Saturday Night Live, which said the man "was subdued by the new 'Gimmie a Reason Bert'".

TMX and other toys helped Mattel's earnings for the third quarter of the 2006 financial year to grow by six percent and beat the expectations of financial analysts. In January 2007, Mattel announced it would release TMX Friends, featuring Elmo, Ernie and Cookie Monster.

== See also ==
- Furby
- ZhuZhu Pets
- Hatchimal
- FurReal Friends
- List of toys
