= Frop =

Frop may refer to:

- "Frop", a song on Blackmail's 2001 album Bliss, Please
- "Frop", slang for Habafropzipulops: the alleged substance in the pipe of J.R. "Bob" Dobbs of the Church of the SubGenius

FROP may refer to:

- Funeral Rule Offenders Program, in the United States, an FTC program to ensure that funeral providers comply with its Funeral Rule
- Falling Rate of Profit, also known as the tendency of the rate of profit to fall, a central element in Marxist economic theory.

== See also ==
- Frap (disambiguation)
