= Sick Bricks =

- Genre: Children; Animation
- Starring: Benjamin Diskin; Robbie Daymond; Laura Bailey
- Country of origin: United States
- Original language: English
- No. of seasons: 1
- No. of episodes: 20

Production
- Running time: 1-2 minutes

Original release
- Network: Cartoon Network Website
- Release: March 9, 2015 – 2015

Sick Bricks is an American animated short series that is an acquired series for Cartoon Network, it is based on the mobile video game of the same name owned by Spin Master which is inspired by Toys-to-life games.

== Plot ==
The series follows Jack Justice, a local hero who gains the ability to copy everyone's powers in the strange world of Sick City, a city populated by ninjas, aliens, monsters, pirates, superheroes and all sorts of wacky characters. However a villain by the name of Overlord Omega arrives and despises the city's randomness, to which he and his army of Omega Goons wanting to rid the city of its weirdness so he could take it over "normally". Now its up for Jack Justice and the rest of Sick City's inhabitants to save their beloved home by working together and combining their abilities in order to put a stop on Overlord Omega's plans.

== Characters ==
Each character is separated into different factions based on themes from pop culture:

=== The Crew ===
- Jack Justice
- Katie Kantmiss
- Alex Awesome

=== Ninjas ===
- Hiro Thunderbutt
- Johnny Sweeps
- Socky Rockfoot
- Silent Shadow
- Samurai Swordmaster
- Frost Ninja

=== Space ===
- Ace Orbit
- Redzone Ranger
- Tiberius Warpspeed
- Xeno Mite
- Space Stalker
- Major Blazer

=== City ===
- Smokey Burns
- Katt Burglar
- Gus Groucho
- SWAT Cop
- Officer Kuffowitz

=== Monsters ===
- Rotten Walker
- Hank Hacksaw
- Vlad Von Vein
- Harry Fangface
- Stanley Screamer
- Franken Studz
- Captain Blockbeard

=== Mutants ===
- Manely Chesthair
- Sheldon Davinci
- Bam Boozler
- Sharky Chumbucket
- Dino Biter
- Testy Monkey
- Bucky Blastoff
- Neil Anderthal
- Baron Von Bear
- Rockin' Rhino

=== Super Heroes ===
- Knight Rat
- Uber Woman
- Finley Fishsticker
- Ray Lightbeam
- Jack Wisecracker
- Doc Devio
- Sunny Bladewalker

=== Hollywood ===
- MC Mogul
- Punky Crewster
- Tami Miami
- Dean Idol
- Glen Gothly

=== Robots ===
- Protecto Servo
- Scuttle Bot
- Al Beeback
- Perfectimus Supreme
- Rusty Nuggets
- Circuit Sentry

=== Spies ===
- Dubio Sven
- Tricky Tasha
- Covert Cobra
- Sneaky Steve
- Undercover Barber
- Nefarious Nemesis

=== Fantasy ===
- King Barfer
- Wizzy Bearball
- Sir Axalot
- Lavender Deathskirt
- Scaly Scorcher
- Double Rainbow
- Demonic Dude

=== Sports ===
- Pauly Pigskin
- Becky Backhand
- Donnie Dribbles
- Sammy Strikeout
- Chris Checker

=== Fighters ===
- Macho Mike
- Breaki Smashian
- Tightpants Trooper
- Sally Smackdown
- Cheese Grater
- Alley Bomber

=== Sharkinator ===
- Young Deevy
- Rusted Stumbler
- Cyber Chief
- Robo Kuff
- Stealth Shade

=== Omega Goons ===
- Pyro Techie
- Sludge Hammer
- Spin Doctor
- Magna Minion
- Omega Blaster

=== Bizarros ===
- DJ Chill
- Twilight Assassin
- Rogue Robot
- Bluezone Battler
- Angry Arbitrator

=== Military ===
- Commander Toughneck
- Banana Boomer
- Scuba Spy
- Haz Matt
- War Thog

=== Epic Monster ===
- Arizona Clark
- Deepsi Diver
- Debbie Stormbelly

=== Big Boss ===
- Lord Invisigor
- Count Invocator

== Episodes list ==
Sick Bricks has only had one season, which included twenty episodes. All of them being on Cartoon Network's Website.

| No. | Title | Original release date | Prod. code |
|---|---|---|---|
| 1 | "Enter Overlord Omega" | March 9, 2015 | 101 |
Overlord Omega and his plans are introduced.
| 2 | "Dungeon Duel" | March 16, 2015 | 102 |
Jack's training hideout is revealed.
| 3 | "Goth a Bad Feeling" | March 23, 2015 | 103 |
Glen Gothly arrives in town.
| 4 | "Castle Chaos" | March 30, 2015 | 104 |
Harry and Frankenstuds rebuilds Vlad's castle.
| 5 | "Stowaway" | April 6, 2015 | 105 |
The Goons unleash a blandness bazooka.
| 6 | "Monster Mash Up" | April 6, 2015 | 106 |
Vlad and Rotten Walker take on a goon.
| 7 | "Rooster vs. Rat" | April 6, 2015 | 107 |
Rusty Nuggets bends Night Rat's ears.
| 8 | "Driver's Ed Dread" | April 13, 2015 | 108 |
Jack helps Frankenstuds with his driving test.
| 9 | "Sick Mix" | April 20, 2015 | 109 |
Mc Mogul spins some tunes.
| 10 | "Fools Gold" | April 20, 2015 | 110 |
Doc Devio makes counterfeit gold bricks.
| 11 | "Last Ninja Standing" | April 20, 2015 | 111 |
A ribbon cutting leads to a disagreement between Blockbeard and Silent Shadow.
| 12 | "Meditation Vacation" | April 20, 2015 | 112 |
Jack learns how to meditate.
| 13 | "Egg Scramble" | April 27, 2015 | 113 |
Jack and Xenomite protect Xeno's egg.
| 14 | "Blazin' Donuts" | May 4, 2015 | 114 |
Ace and Smokey duke it out over a donut.
| 15 | "Build a Better Goon" | May 4, 2015 | 115 |
Goons pass through the Warped Gate.
| 16 | "Super Heroes?" | May 4, 2015 | 116 |
Knight Rat and Tightpants battle a goon.
| 17 | "Back and Forth" | May 4, 2015 | 117 |
Overlord and Gus play a game of tennis with a goon.
| 18 | "Shhhh" | May 11, 2015 | 118 |
A goon is attacked by Jack and Silent Shadow.
| 19 | "Bad Hair Day" | 2015 | 119 |
Donnie Dribbles is stuck in a basketball hoop.
| 20 | "Rodent Rumble" | 2015 | 120 |
Doc Devio has a new Mega-Ray.
