= Greg Hyman =

American toy inventor (1947–2026)

Greg Eaton Hyman (June 25, 1947 – May 1, 2026) was an American toy inventor who was the co-creator of Tickle Me Elmo, a vibrating, giggling stuffed doll that was one of the most popular toys of 1996.

== Biography ==
Hyman was born in New Rochelle, New York, on June 25, 1947. As a pre-teen, he offered paid lessons to teach his schoolmates about electricity, with the first three lessons offered free, and charged for rides on a rocket ship toy that was built using an old washing machine. He dropped out of Cornell University during his first year so that he could focus on crafting inventions in his basement, which included a hovering bumper car and an anti-siphoning device to protect gas tanks in cars.

Together with Larry Greenberg, Hyman began developing a variety of toys, including an electric musical toy that went on sale in 1979 after being acquired by Playskool. Subsequently, he created dolls that "drank" milk from a bottle and another whose heart started beating when a toy stethoscope was touched against the doll's chest. In the 1990s, Hyman developed a toy for Barney the title character from Barney & Friends and, together with Greenberg, developed such toys as a talking robot. As partners, Hyman developed more than 40 inventions with Greenberg before his death in 1992.

Ron Dubren, a fellow inventor, approached him and suggested developing a toy that would giggle and developed Tickles the Chimp, a laughing monkey toy. They met with a representative from Tyco Toys, who was not interested in the monkey toy, but thought that the giggling technology would be a good fit for a toy based on Elmo, a character from The Muppets featured on Sesame Street. However, Tyco only had the license to produce plastic toys based on Sesame Street at the time, as rights for plush toys belonged to Hasbro, which were due to expire. The project thus began as Tickle Me Taz, a toy based on the Tasmanian Devil cartoon character from Looney Tunes, which Tyco did have the license for. After Tyco Toys won the license to produce plush toys based on Sesame Street, Dubren and Hyman pivoted to developing an Elmo toy, which would vibrate three times and say, "That Tickles!" when squeezed. Released in summer 1996, the toy sold out its initial run of 400,000 toys on Black Friday, the shopping day in the United States after Thanksgiving. Hyman later recalled that "I don't have to worry about money" after creating the Tickle Me Elmo toy.

A resident of Boca Raton, Florida, Hyman died at his home on May 1, 2026. He was 78.
