= Hatchimals =

Toy line by Spin Master

- Type: Model figure
- Company: Spin Master
- Country: Canada
- Availability: October 7, 2016–present
- Official website

Hatchimals is a line of mini-figures produced by the Canadian toy company Spin Master. The flagship toys are mini-figures that feature an egg. Pressing a heart on the egg "hatches" an animal or fairy inside. When the line was introduced, the toy was a robotic animal—representing one of various species—that "hatched" itself from an egg.

After their initial release in October 2016, the toys faced an unexpectedly high demand. Media outlets expected them to be the top seller of the holiday season. As a result, there were raffles and waiting lists over the limited stock; and comparisons were made to other major toy phenomena, such as Cabbage Patch Kids, Tickle Me Elmo and Furby.

== History ==
David McDonald envisioned a concept for a toy that could unbox itself. This idea evolved into a concept for a robotic creature that would hatch itself from an egg, necessitating the design of a mechanism for the hatching, and a material for the egg itself. Hatchimals was officially launched on October 7, 2016, backed by advertising on television and digital platforms, such as social networking services. On launch, five possible species were available: Bearakeet, Burtle, Draggle, Penguala, and Owlicorn.

In 2017, Spin Master introduced Hatchimals Colleggtibles, a line of miniature, collectible figures also invented by David McDonald in a blind bag form, these ended up becoming the main line, while the robotic toys would be discontinued. The robotic toys returned in 2024 under the name "Hatchimals Alive".

== Demand ==
On launch, demand for Hatchimals was extremely high, which led to them being designated as the "hottest" toy of the 2016 Christmas shopping season. By late October, Hatchimals occupied multiple spots on NPD Group's top ten list of best-selling toys in the United States, including first, second, sixth, and ninth place. The firm compared the phenomenon to those surrounding Cabbage Patch Kids and Tickle Me Elmo. The New York Times and The Globe and Mail documented the organisation of raffles and waiting lists for the toys, and sellers on websites such as Amazon.com and eBay selling Hatchimals at over three times their suggested retail price of US$60, if not higher.

The high demand made defects with some of the toys more prominent, with some customers complaining that they had issues initiating the hatching process (which involves interacting with the egg over a period of time), or that the batteries in the toy within did not have enough capacity left to complete it (necessitating manual extraction). The company did acknowledge that some customers had difficulty with the hatching, stating that it had increased the capacity and business hours of its customer care call centres, and had posted tips and tutorials online to assist in the process. Prominent lawyer Mark Geragos backed a lawsuit over Hatchimals, alleging that Spin Master purposely intended the toy to not operate successfully all the time, causing disappointment and frustration among the parents who made great lengths to purchase it for the holidays.

Spin Master was caught off-guard by the unexpected demand; the company originally stated that the toy would appeal primarily to girls aged 6 to 8, but Hatchimals ultimately became popular among boys and older youth audiences as well. The company attempted to address the supply issues by having its remaining stock from China delivered via air freight instead of by ship, but stated that there may not be new stock of Hatchimals until 2017. However, Martin added that the company planned to introduce new species and features to the Hatchimals line, and asked customers to be patient.

== See also ==
- Cabbage Patch Kids
- Beanie Babies
- Furby
- Tickle Me Elmo
- ZhuZhu Pets
- FurReal Friends
