= Mighty Express =

Canadian CGI-animated children's television series

- Created by: Keith Chapman
- Directed by: Clint Butler
- Voices of: Jay Hatton; Zoe Hatz; Meesha Contreras; Dylan Schombing; Tyler Nathan; Leo Orgil; Michela Luci; Ian Ho; Evan LeFeuvre; Annick Obonsawin; Gracen Daly
- Country of origin: Canada
- Original language: English
- No. of seasons: 7
- No. of episodes: 44

Production
- Executive producers: Jennifer Dodge; Keith Chapman; Ronnen Harary; Suzanne Bolch (episodes 1–5); John May (episodes 1–5)
- Producer: Jonah Stroh; Dan Mokriy; Christina Sang-St. Catherine; David Sharples (episodes 5–21); Marise Kruger; Shayna Fine (episodes 17–44)
- Running time: 14 minutes (seasons 1–3); 28 minutes (seasons 4–7)
- Production companies: Atomic Cartoons; Spin Master Entertainment

Original release
- Network: Netflix
- Release: September 22, 2020 – August 29, 2022

Mighty Express is a Canadian animated television series created by British producer Keith Chapman. The series is produced by Spin Master Entertainment in partnership with Netflix, while the animation is produced by Atomic Cartoons. It was released on September 22, 2020.

The show was followed by a Christmas special, titled A Mighty Christmas, released on December 5, 2020. The second season was released on February 2, 2021, while the third season was released on April 13, 2021. The fourth season was released on July 27, 2021, while the fifth season was released on October 12, 2021. Ahead of its sixth season premiere, a special, titled Train Trouble, was released on January 18, 2022. The sixth season was released on March 29, 2022, while the seventh and final season was released on August 29, 2022. The show was followed by an interactive special, titled Mighty Trains Race, released on December 5, 2022.

== Plot ==
The series takes place in Tracksville, a town located in a reality where human adults (with the exception of Santa Claus) have never existed and where children run the stations and other locations. They work together with the Mighty Express trains (who have the ability to talk and are intelligent). The trains all have their own roles and duties within Tracksville, and their own individual set of tools and cargo cars to help them with their adventures so they always ensure to make their home a better place where trains and human children alike live together in peace and harmony.

== Characters ==
=== Trains ===
==== Main ====
The series follows the adventures of eight trains each with a different purpose and skill.

- Freight Nate (voiced by Dylan Schombing and Tony Daniels when singing opera in "Big Bart's Wild Ride") is a fast red train. His job is hauling heavy freight. He is strong, fast, friendly and heroic. Nate is equipped with an onboard crane with a hydraulic claw at the end of his cable. He also has a set of stabilizer legs to help him keep steady while loading his cars.
- Mechanic Milo (voiced by Leo Orgil) Mechanic Milo's main job is keeping the tracks in tip top shape, but he will tackle any puzzle that gets thrown his way. He is curious and dependable and highly detail oriented. Milo has a hydraulic arm mounted on his back, with a claw on the end resembling a monkey wrench. He can also fire tracks from his front bufferbeam. His cab sports robotic arms in the sides and either drive spikes into the tracks he lays or welds them together.
- Build-It Brock (voiced by Tyler Nathan) builds what the town needs. Brock loves to help, even though he can be a bit shy at times. Brock has a cement mixer on his back and is equipped with a set of front end loader arms on his front.
- Farmer Faye (voiced by Michela Luci) is kind and caring. Her job is to move farm produce and animals and help out on the farm with feeding and fertilizing. Faye is friendly and community-minded, always keeping tabs on every train, child, and critter in town. Her front section has a set of combine harvester reels. Faye is the only mighty Express train not to run on bogies, as she has four small driving wheels joined by a pair of two larger ones, connected by a complex of coupling rods. She overall resembles a tractor crossed with a steam locomotive. She also speaks with a strong and powerful Southwestern US accent, and has a lasso in her roof to boot.
- Rescue Red (voiced by Evan Lefeuvre) is a red fire engine/EMT train and the older brother to Flicker, who makes breathtaking rescues and takes care of the safety of everyone in town. He takes his job very seriously and is always focused on reciting helpful or not-so-helpful regulations from his handy guide, Red's Rulebook. Red has a ladder on his back and a set of emergency lights atop his cab.
- Peoplemover Penny (voiced by Annick Obonsawin) is super friendly. Her job is to move children from station to station and greets everyone in the morning with her bubbly personality. Penny can open her roof and elevate her seats to let her passengers into the open air.
- Flicker (voiced by Ian Ho) is a tiny red engine and the little brother of Rescue Red. Flicker is in charge of small rescues. He is energetic and playful, but sometimes a bit naive. Flicker features a single light on his roof, and he features a fire hose reel on his rear that can also discharge air. Flicker is smaller than the other trains, and as such, his interior is meant more for Diesel to ride in.
- Mandy Mail (voiced by Gracen Daly) is a new female character that debuted in A Mighty Christmas. Mandy is very prideful and often expects important deliveries and at times will refuse help even when she needs it. Her job is to transport letters from kids and take them to either the North Pole for Santa Claus to receive or any destination around the world. Mandy joined the main roster starting with the Christmas special, and as a mail carrier, she possesses multiple compartments to carry packages and letters. Much like Flicker, Mandy's interior is meant more for animals to ride in, primarily Flap the Carrier Pigeon. She also has letter shooters.

=== Humans ===
==== Main ====
- Max (voiced by Jay Hatton) is the leader of the team and the main kid in charge. Max is exuberant, energetic, inspiring, and empathetic.
- Liza (voiced by Zoe Hatz) is a train whisperer. Despite being a mechanical engineer, she is creative, handy, optimistic, and all-around spunky. Always tinkering and poking around to see how things work. She is the only human member of the Mighty Express team who is female.
- Nico (voiced by Meesha Contreras) is the trackmaster and cartographer. He is a quick thinker and multitasker; his nerdy enthusiasm also makes him a great puzzle solver.

==== Recurring/Minor ====
- Jubilee (voiced by Matilda Simons) is a girl with a disability who is possibly the mayor of Tracksville since she organizes special events and gives speeches.
- Clay (voiced by Benjamin Hum) is a young cowboy who runs the Farm Station with May.
- May (voiced by Lori Phun) is a young cowgirl who runs the Farm Station with Clay.
- Carrie (voiced by Maya Vujicic) is a young girl who runs thevMail Station.
- Amanda (voiced by Aaliyah Cinello) is a young girl who wears a headband with cat ears. She is Jaden's older sister, and appears to be the main kid in charge at the School Station.
- Jaden (voiced by Adrian Groulx) is a young boy who is Amanda's younger brother.
- Finn (voiced by Marcus Cornwall and Javien Rankine) is a young boy who runs the Beach Station and also acts as the local lifeguard.
- Skipper (voiced by Chris D'Silva) is a young boy who runs the Port Station.
- Dusty (voiced by Millie Davis) is a young girl who runs the Building Yard Station. She helps with major construction projects in Tracksville.
- Ivy (voiced by Abigail Nicholson) is a young girl who is the organizer and counselor of outdoor activities at Camp Itchiknee.
- Marcus (voiced by Caleb Bellavance) is a young boy who runs the Central Square donut shop.
- Rocky (voiced by Callum Shoniker) is a young boy who lives at Pointy Peak Station.
- Santa Claus (voiced by Ron Pardo) is notable for being the only known adult human in the Mighty Express universe. His busy elves, however, are portrayed much more like the children of the Mighty Express universe. The head elf of Santa is voiced by Saara Chaudry.

=== Animals ===
- The Popstar Piggies also known as (Flashy, Splashy, Glitzy and Larry) (voiced by Bryn McAuley and Richard Binsley) are a quartet of domestic pigs who perform at events in Tracksville.
- Goaty McGoat is a goat who lives on top of Corkscrew Curve and has a tendency to get in trouble around Tracksville since his hair is blocking its eye. Despite this, he is beloved by all who know him.
- Diesel (voiced by Robert Tinkler) is a domestic dog who wears an American locomotive engineer's hat and a red bandana with purple spots. He most often spends his time either alone or with Flicker, and serves to keep the young train on the right track.
- Dippers (voiced by Dee Bradley Baker) is a common bottlenose dolphin that swims close to the Port Station.
- Chompy (voiced by Frank Welker) is a North American beaver who lives at the Building Yard Station.
- Cows (both voiced by Richard Binsley) are a herd of cows that reside at Farm Station.
- Flap is a carrier pigeon in a mailman's outfit who works with Mandy Mail. Unlike Diesel, Flap works with Mandy full-time.
- Giggles is a baby giant pacific octopus who swims close to the Beach Station.
- Snowball is a king penguin who lives in the Pointy Peak Station.
- Big Bart is a Spanish fighting bull who is the newest animal in the Farm Station. He hates loud noises and loves opera music
- Tiny is a blue whale who lives within the waters of the Beach Station.
- Squirrel is an unnamed squirrel that lives within the forests outside of Tracksville.

=== Villains ===
==== Train ====
- Tricky Ricky (voiced by Rahul Joshi in the UK dub and Christian Campbell in the US dub) is a trickster who while charismatic at first glance is very immature compared to the other trains, focusing on causing trouble for others instead of helping them. He works as a part of a duo with Sneaky Stella, though the two often argue on whose name goes first. Ricky is equipped with multiple tools and gadgets that rival the main Mighty Express trains, including a few that are copied directly from them. He and Stella debuted in the special Train Trouble.

==== Human ====
- Sneaky Stella (voiced by Ada Tracz in the UK dub and Shazdeh Kapadia in the US dub) is a young girl who delights in causing chaos, and unlike the Mighty Express crew doesn't care about the problems of others. She works as a part of a duo with Tricky Ricky, though the two often argue on whose name goes first. She and Ricky were introduced in the special Train Trouble.

== Episodes ==
=== Series overview ===
Season	Episodes	Originally released
1	10	September 22, 2020
Specials	3	December 15, 2020
2	8	February 2, 2021
3	8	April 13, 2021
4	4	July 26, 2021
5	4	October 12, 2021
6	4	March 29, 2022
7	6	September 29, 2022

=== Season 1 (2020) ===
No. overall	No. in season	Title	Written by	Original release date
1	1	"The Great Nate Chase"	Suzanne Bolch & John May	September 22, 2020
The Pop Star Piggies have to get to the fair for a performance, but Faye damages her brakes on Corkscrew Curve after the pigs cause a ruckus, forcing Nate to give chase for a rescue before she crashes into town. After 2 failed attempts, he quickly learns that speed is not everything.
2	2	"Super Nate"	Peter Steen Hunziker	September 22, 2020
The new "Super Train" comic books have not arrived in town yet, and as a fan of the book series, Nate will not stop until he delivers them to Tracksville, but after he refuses help to deal with obstacles, it takes him a lot of effort on an open drawbridge to realize that even heroes need a team.
3	3	"Bat Cave Tunnel"	John Philip Loy	September 22, 2020
It is camping time in Tracksville, but to finish her job, Penny has to go through a tunnel filled with bats, a type of animal that makes her scared. Her fear of bats causes her to take several detours causing delays, forcing Brock and Milo to help her out of a jam.
4	4	"Liza Live"	David Rosenberg	September 22, 2020
Milo and Liza are playing in a concert, but Milo has to bring Liza's drum set to the stage before they can perform. Things get complicated when the car carrying the drums starts to roll away and its cargo disappears and moves around Tracksville mysteriously in random locations.
5	5	"How the Ball Bounces"	Peter Steen Hunziker	September 22, 2020
Flicker has to deliver beach balls for his first Mega Mission, but he does not want everyone else to know something is wrong, so he keeps his current situation to himself, and does not ask for help when he needs it. Ultimately, he finds he has to relent when the situation goes much too far.
6	6	"The Toppling Tower"	Robin J. Stein	September 22, 2020
Brock is in charge of building a new tower, but the other trains make suggestions of their own and ignore his suggestion for a design. As a result, they begin piling their own materials onto his supplies and weigh him down. At the site, pressure from his friends makes Brock build in a way that causes his tower to end up extremely rickety.
7	7	"Pop Stars"	Peter Steen Hunziker	September 22, 2020
For Super Train's first movie, Faye is tasked with hauling over the popcorn for their movie night, but the popcorn is also wanted by geese, which forces them to take a series of detours that cause them to lose much of the popcorn.
8	8	"The Donutty Day"	John Philip Loy	September 22, 2020
With Max at his side, Nate has to deliver a giant decorative donut to the new donut shop, but Clay and May's chickens believe it to be real, and having grown tired of chicken feed, the farm birds set out after Nate and Max to eat the giant fake confection, causing all sorts of mayhem for the two doing so.
9	9	"Let It Ride"	Peter Steen Hunziker	September 22, 2020
Milo is constructing a rollercoaster with him as the main form of traction power, but Nico is afraid of rollercoasters and does not want to go. Things go wrong when the coaster cars run away with Nico inside them, and Milo struggles to get him to stop.
10	10	"Freight Nate's Fright Night"	John Philip Loy	September 22, 2020
When Flicker dresses up as a ghost train, Nate, who is secretly afraid of ghosts, mistakes him for a real one and almost jeopardizes his Halloween candy delivery. The car ends up starting to sink in quicksand, and Nate is forced to face his fear of ghosts to help Flicker save the candy.

=== Specials (2020–22) ===
No.	Title	Written by	Original release date
1	"A Mighty Christmas"	Ron Holsey	December 5, 2020
The entire Mighty Express fleet and their new member Mandy Mail must pitch in when Christmas is jeopardized by delayed letters, an inability to make more toys, and a snowstorm so big the reindeer cannot fly.
2	"Train Trouble"	Scott Gray	January 18, 2022
Flicker has a crisis in confidence when he is unable to help out on the same level as the other trains, but he might be the crew's last hope if they are to retake Mission Station from Tricky Ricky and Sneaky Stella.
3	"Mighty Trains Race"	Dan Danko	December 5, 2022
Freight Nate gets tricked into participating in a high-speed race with all the Mighty Express cargo cars at stake.

=== Season 2 (2021) ===
No. overall	No. in season	Title	Written by	Original release date
11	1	"Chug-a-Love Day"	Adam Beechen	February 2, 2021
On Chug-a-Love Day, Mandy is tasked with transporting all of the cards to Central Square Station. Unfortunately, the importance of the occasion leaves her in over her head, and as she refuses to share the glory of delivering the cards, she does things her way after Flicker helps to catch any lost mails.
12	2	"Oink-a-Palooza"	Denise Downer	February 2, 2021
Tracksville is celebrating the Oink-a-Palooza. The Popstar Piggies have a sunset concert at the festival, but unfortunately it fell on one of the hottest days of the year, forcing Faye to try to beat the clock without overheating, which worsens after she gets stuck on a hoodoo and needs a rescue from Red.
13	3	"The Treasure of King Toot"	David Rosenberg	February 2, 2021
While finishing up a construction job, Nico and Brock find a treasure map leading to King Toot's treasure and are tasked with delivering it to Museum Station. Although Brock lacks much confidence in himself as a treasure hunter, Nico's support and his own creativity allow him to succeed and realize he is a special train after he makes through all traps.
14	4	"Octopus Express"	Denise Downer	February 2, 2021
While an upset giant octopus couple makes havoc at Beach Station, Faye has to deliver their baby. Unfortunately, a detour causes them to encounter a rockslide that damages the aquarium wagon, and while Faye clears the tracks, Red and Milo now have to hurry and deliver the baby before the water leaks out of the car completely.
15	5	"Get That Goat"	Clark Stubbs	February 2, 2021
Faye and Liza have to take Goaty to his birthday party, but things get intimidating when the guest of honor disappears mid-transit. Due to an unfortunate series of events, Goaty ends up causing trouble all around Tracksville while chasing his birthday present, and Faye and Liza end up chasing him everywhere to get him to his party on time.
16	6	"Milosaurus"	Evan Thaler Hicky	February 2, 2021
To complete Nico's new dinosaur exhibit in Museum Station, he needs one more giant bone to put the T-Rex skeleton together, and Milo has to get it there. Despite his enthusiasm, Milo quickly encounters hiccups with his mega mission, as they end up spending much more time chasing the bone than carrying it.
17	7	"Brock's Beam Scheme"	Joseph Clark Stubbs	February 2, 2021
While Penny shuttles children to school for show-and-tell, the kids wants to ride the Bugle Bridge all over that Penny ends up wrecking it before fully crossing it, leading for Brock and Liza to get called on for a major repair job. Unfortunately, his load keeps causing problems, especially when they pass through town.
18	8	"Balloon Hullabaloo"	David Rosenberg	February 2, 2021
Flicker is given the job of transporting large helium balloons to thank Jubilee for helping everyone. Despite being excited for the mission, Flicker worries that he is too small to deal with the large balloons, especially after the balloons almost float him away, but with a little help from his big brother Red, he just might be able to make the delivery.

=== Season 3 (2021) ===
No. overall	No. in season	Title	Written by	Original release date
19	1	"Rocket & Roll"	Peter Steen Hunziker	April 13, 2021
Milo has two big repairs to fix in one day and he gets the bright idea of strapping a rocket booster onto his frame to speed things up. Unfortunately, his new attachment ends up causing sparks, leaving it up to Rescue Red to catch up and rescue him before it's going out of control.
20	2	"Freight Nate's Achoo-choo"	Peter Steen Hunziker	April 13, 2021
Clay and May need more salt and pepper for their chili, but Nate will have to stop sneezing to make the delivery in time for the town picnic, especially after the pepper shaker loses its cap and disperses its contents everywhere.
21	3	"Knight Time"	David Rosenberg	April 13, 2021
Nate and Nico chase after Museum Station's newly polished suit of armor after some cheese-hungry group of mice who stowed away inside after it was polished. The mice use it to try to catch their next snack, a large cheese wheel being taken to market by Marcus.
22	4	"Offline Zipline"	Clark Stubbs	April 13, 2021
Flicker is now old enough to ride Camp Itchiknee's zipline, but the zipline is broken, and before Milo and Liza arrive to fix it, Flicker and Diesel become stranded, and the two unexpected rescuers have to save their friends before they float out to sea.
23	5	"Delivery Dilemma"	Dan Danko	April 13, 2021
Red has to deliver a boxcar full of pogo sticks and safety helmets to School Station before recess, but due to a mix-up at Port Station, his cargo accidentally gets swapped with a delivery of animal feed meant for Farmer Faye to take to Farm Station. Chaos ensues when the animal feed ends up flooding the school building and the farm animals start bouncing around.
24	6	"Sticky Situation"	Dan Danko	April 13, 2021
Nate and Nico try their best to avoid making a mess on the tracks while they deliver barrels of maple syrup to the town's pancake party, but after they roll off, the two find themselves having to use their wits to get them back for the party.
25	7	"Nate's Crushing It"	Robin j. Stein	April 13, 2021
Penny has to deliver a large block of ice so that people at Beach Station can enjoy some snow cones to make it through the heat. Unfortunately, a rockslide hits the mashine, forcing Nate to help assist before the heat of the sun melts the ice block.
26	8	"Mystery of the Missing Wood"	David Rosenberg	April 13, 2021
After Penny almost falls down a broken track section on Corkscrew Curve tracks, Milo and Nico set out to fix it, also to find that the fence at Farm Station and the pier at Beach Station have also been damaged. The two later discover a beaver was responsible for the damage, and set out to keep it away from wood that wasn't being used.

=== Season 4 (2021) ===
No. overall	No. in season	Title	Written by	Original release date
27	1	"Knight, Knight, Dragon"	Zac Atkinson	July 26, 2021
27	1	"Bubble Trouble"	Sarah Katin & Nakia Trower Suman	July 26, 2021
Nate and Nico have to transport and inflatable dragon to Camp Itchiknee for the screening of the new Knight movie, but chaos ensues when the prop inflates prematurely, and the two have to get it there while keeping it safe, easier said than done when it flies away. Milo and Nico have the job of transporting a bubble blower to beach station for a party, but when they testing the mashine, the bubbles ends up surrounding all tracks and trapping anything and anyone, forcing all involved on an impromptu rescue mission.
28	2	"Piggies Rock the House"	Robin J. Stein	July 26, 2021
28	2	"Big Bart's Wild Ride"	John Philip Loy	July 26, 2021
Amanda orders a bounce house for Jaden's birthday party, and Red is in charge making sure it is safe for all. Unfortunately, the Popstar Piggies are determined to take a bounce, and the stakes get raised when the music-loving mammals send it on a runaway bouncing spree. Clay and May are expecting a new bull named Big Bart, but Faye breaks her rods and is unable to move anywhere fast, so Nate is tasked with bringing the bull to Farm Station. Unfortunately, he takes a shortcut that startles the bull, and he now has to deal with a runaway farmyard animal across all of Tracksville.
29	3	"Volcano Kablamo"	Dan Danko	July 26, 2021
29	3	"Brock's Rock-in Penguins"	Marc Seal	July 26, 2021
Milo helps Jaden make a model volcano for the science fair, but even with Nate's help in transporting it, they run into a large number of hiccups en route, including a premature press of the eruption button, launching a race against time before the model begins its eruption. Flicker, Rocky and Snowball uncover a glowing crystal at Pointy Peak Station while playing hacky sack, and Brock and Nico is given the job of transporting it to Museum Station. Unfortunately, Snowball and a few other penguins are disrupting their journey because Snowball's hacky sack is stuck in the glowing crystal.
30	4	"Clank!"	Zac Atkinson	July 26, 2021
30	4	"Milo Reaches for the Stars"	Robin J. Stein	July 26, 2021
Milo is tasked with helping Nico finish his new museum exhibit by picking up a giant magnet. Unfortunately, in their enthusiasm to experiment, the magnet creates all sorts of chaos around Tracksville, and the delivery is severely hampered when the magnet is stuck on full power, forcing Nate to help them. To see a rare comet at Pointy Peak Station, Milo is tasked with delivering a telescope for everyone to use. However, the telescope's size make it difficult to move.

=== Season 5 (2021) ===
No. overall	No. in season	Title	Written by	Original release date
31	1	"Sheriff Red"	Peter Gaffney	October 12, 2021
31	1	"Pizza Day"	David Rosenberg	October 12, 2021
Brock, Milo and Nico find the long lost Great Golden Stagecoach while playing hide and seek, and to carry on Red's great-grandfather's delivery, he is chosen to deliver its cargo of gold bars to the bank. However, chaos ensues when a jealous Mandy takes it herself to get the glory. Flicker is given the job of delivering a large load of pizzas around Tracksville before they get cold. He ends up ruining his delivery while trying to make a fast one.
32	2	"The Domino Effect"	Robin J. Stein	October 12, 2021
32	2	"Quack Express"	Rachel Graham	October 12, 2021
Milo and Nico set off to create Tracksville's largest domino chain. However, the delivery quickly falls into chaos. After losing Tiny the whale's favorite rubber duck, Faye is tasked with delivering a bigger one as a replacement. Unfortunately, the duck's size and noise makes the delivery very difficult.
33	3	"A Mighty Windmill"	Ken Pontac	October 12, 2021
33	3	"Robot on the Run"	David Rosenberg	October 12, 2021
After the Popstar Piggies break the windmill at Farm Station, Nate is tasked with delivering a replacement for the slumber party, but a period in Gusty Gulch forces several detours that causes the windmill to spin too fast. A shipment of popular wind-up toy robots are expected to be shipped to Central Square Station, and Flicker is set to deliver it. Despite his gusto, the whole team has to pitch in and help when the giant robot heads for a crash course with Mission Station.
34	4	"Diesel's Doghouse Delivery"	Zac Atkinson	October 12, 2021
34	4	"Monkey Wrench"	Patrick Rieger	October 12, 2021
Diesel the Dog is receiving a new doghouse after his old one gets wrecked in a game of catch, and Flicker is given the Mega Mission of delivering one custom built by Dusty and Brock. The only problem is Diesel does not want it dirty, but keeping it clean while in transit is easier said than done. A stowaway monkey arrives in a banana shipment meant for Flicker, and Faye is tasked with taking him back to the jungle. However, she has little experience with dealing with monkeys, which comes to be problematic when the monkey steals Skipper's monkey wrench.

=== Season 6 (2022) ===
No. overall	No. in season	Title	Written by	Original release date
35	1	"Mighty Milo"	Patrick Rieger	March 29, 2022
35	1	"Sing Out Proud"	Peter Steen Hunziker	March 29, 2022
Milo is tasked with delivering ice pops to a Super Train event at Museum Station. However, he and Liza have encountered a serious problem; Tricky Ricky and Sneaky Stella have stolen the frozen goods! Brock makes tracks with the DJ booth for Faye's big concert, but will have to get over his stage fright when the star of the show has lost her voice.
36	2	"Piñata Express"	Liam Farrell	March 29, 2022
36	2	"Tomato Sauce Trouble"	Rachel Graham	March 29, 2022
Flicker is earning his rescue team badge, and everyone is throwing him a surprise party. Red has to deliver the party's giant piñata, but keeping it both safe and out of Flicker's sight is proving to be a challenge. When Marcus runs out of tomatoes for making Spaghetti Sunday's famous pasta sauce, Faye is tasked with gathering more. However, the tomatoes grown have reached a very large size that makes their transport challenging.
37	3	"A Beary Special Picnic"	David Rosenberg	March 29, 2022
37	3	"Gimme a Lift"	Dan Danko	March 29, 2022
When Jaden forgets to bring a teddy bear to Amanda's picnic, Nate is set to bring him a large one. However, the stuffed animal soon gets a real mother bear and her cub involved in hair-raising shenanigans. Brock is given the mission of fixing a broken bridge, but he suffers an unfortunate breakdown before he makes it. Milo and Liza have to fix him before he can fix the bridge, but they have to hurry when a traffic jam results in Big Bart going wild on the bridge.
38	4	"Can Do!"	Dan Danko	March 29, 2022
38	4	"Skunked"	Andrew Blanchette	March 29, 2022
Flicker is given the job of collecting piles of recyclables, but refuses to call for help, wanting to prove himself... though assistance may be the only way to stop a runaway pile. Three baby skunks accidentally leave forest on a load of sticks brought in by Flicker, but when Red is tasked with bringing them home the noisiness of Tracksville quickly proves problematic.

=== Season 7 (2022) ===
No. overall	No. in season	Title	Written by	Original release date
39	1	"Pirate Trains Ahoy!"	Kris Hughes	September 29, 2022
While delivering a pirate ship to Museum Station, the Mighty Express finds a treasure map that leads to a legendary train pirate's secret cave.
40	2	"Nate's Castle Hassle"	Peter Steen Hunziker	September 29, 2022
40	2	"Tub Time"	Dan Danko	September 29, 2022
Nate is on the way to the medieval festival, but Stella and Ricky have other plans. Faye must deliver a tub that is big enough for Bart the bull's bath.
41	3	"The Great Hubcap Heist"	Peter Steen Hunziker	September 29, 2022
41	3	"Pied Piper Brock"	Sheila Rogerson	September 29, 2022
Mandy is determined to get Flicker new hubcaps to thank him for being an acquaintance. All of the farm animals follow Brock while he hauls Dusty's new alphorn.
42	4	"Red's Green Thumb"	Jay D. Waxman	September 29, 2022
42	4	"Painting Pandemonium"	Will Given	September 29, 2022
Red needs to be very safe and careful while delivering fast-growing seeds for the farm. Clay and May's messy barn needs a fresh coat of paint.

==== Shorts (2022) ====
Short Tracks Part 1

Short Tracks Part 2

== Merchandise ==
In 2021, an app based on the series was released for download on any smart device. Spin Master released toys which are Push And Go and Motorized.
