= Sago Mini =

Canadian toy and video game company

Sago Sago Toys Inc.
- Type: Subsidiary
- Industry: Educational video games
- Predecessor: zinc Roe
- Founded: March 6, 2013; 13 years ago
- Founder: Jason Krogh
- Headquarters: Toronto, Canada
- Parent: Toca Boca
- Website: www.sagomini.com

Sago Sago Toys Inc., doing business as Sago Mini, is a Canadian-based toy company and children's video game developer owned by Spin Master.

The company promotes early childhood development through interactive problem solving and storytelling with their cast of "Sago Mini friends", the most prominent of which are Robin the Bird, Jinja the Cat, Harvey the Dog, and Jack the Rabbit.

Following the success of the brand's apps, Sago Mini has since expanded into physical toys, play sets, and books. A television series based on the brand, titled Sago Mini Friends, has been produced for Apple TV+.

== History ==
In 2001, Jason Krogh founded media-company zinc Roe, which created interactive apps and website for children's properties including The Zimmer Twins, Stella and Sam, and Nat Geo Kids. In 2009, the company released their first set of preschool-targeted Tickle Tap apps, which introduced many of Sago Mini's animal characters for the first time. Each app focused on a simple theme or concept such as counting, sounds, or shapes while also promoting the development of a child's fine motor skills.

On March 6, 2013, Swedish app developer Toca Boca and parent company Bonnier Group announced that they had acquired zinc Roe and had re-branded the studio to Sago Sago. The acquisition was made specifically for the suite of Tickle Tap games, which would be re-released under the Sago brand with a new focus of developing titles for a slightly older audience between 5-6.

On April 25, 2016, both Sago Sago and Toca Boca were acquired by Canadian toy and entertainment company Spin Master for SEK 263 million. In 2023, Spin Master launched Piknik, a monthly app subscription which combines their preschool-focused offerings into one service including Sago Mini, thus moving away from the company's former single-app purchase model. Most former apps have been delisted from App Stores and merged into a singular experience titled Sago Mini World.

== Reception ==
Parents have praised Sago Mini titles for their cute designs, creative focus, and lack of attention-retaining techniques seen in other children's content. Writing for The Verge, Alison Johnson noted how each game felt "genuine" and stated "these games don't feed on my kids attention for views and downloads; they reward it". However, she was critical of the company's decision to move to a subscription-based model. Reviewing the Sago Mini Friends app for iMore, Kevin Lynch commended the game as a "worry-free experience" and "the perfect first app for toddlers".
