= Anton Rabie =

Canadian billionaire businessman

- Occupations: Co-CEO, Spin Master
- Known for: co-founder of Spin Master

Anton Rabie is a Canadian billionaire businessman, the co-founder and co-CEO (with Ronnen Harary) of Spin Master, a company in the children's toy industry, famous for popular products such as Hatchimals, Air Hogs, and Paw Patrol. He founded Spin Master in 1994 alongside his childhood friend Ronnen Harary. The pair started the business with an initial investment of $10,000, releasing their first product, "Earth Buddy," which was similar to a Chia Pet.

In 2021, Rabie expanded Spin Master's portfolio by acquiring the Rubik's Cube for $50 million. He took the company public in 2015 and it has since grown into a global enterprise with $1.6 billion in sales, employing over 1,500 people across 16 countries.

Rabie and Ronnen Harary's partnership began when they met at a summer camp in Ontario at the age of 11.

Rabie serves as a mentor to other entrepreneurs and athletes such as tennis player Vasek Pospisil. He was an early financial backer to the Professional Tennis Players Association (PTPA).

As of March 2018, Forbes estimated his net worth at US$1.3 billion.
