= Toca Boca =

Swedish game development studio

- Current logo since April 30, 2024
- Type: Subsidiary
- Founded: 18 July 2010; 16 years ago
- Founder: Björn Jeffery; Emil Ovemar
- Headquarters: Stockholm, Sweden
- Area served: Worldwide
- Key people: Fredrik Löving; (CEO); Emil Ovemar; (Head of Toca Boca Studio)
- Products: Games
- Number of employees: 100-150
- Parent: Spin Master
- Website: www.tocaboca.com

Toca Boca is a Canadian-owned Swedish children's mobile video game developer company. The company is owned by Spin Master and is based in Stockholm, Sweden.

== History ==
Toca Boca was founded 18 July 2010 by Emil Ovemar and Björn Jeffery, both of whom worked for the Bonnier Group. They released their first application, “Helicopter Taxi” in March 2011. Toca Boca's apps have been downloaded over a billion times by users in over 238 markets ever since the first launch.

In 2016, Bonnier sold Toca Boca and sister company Sago Sago to the Canadian toy and entertainment company Spin Master for 263 million Swedish krona. In 2020, Fredrik Löving took over as Toca Boca's new CEO.

== Naming ==
Toca la boca means "touch the mouth" in Spanish, referencing the logo design of a face with an open mouth; as well as being able to skip an app's intro animation by "touching the mouth".

== Games ==
=== Toca Life World ===
Toca Life is a series of games. On 21 November 2018, Toca Boca announced they would be merging all of their Toca Life games into one free-to-play app, titled Toca Life: World. Instead of releasing standalone apps for future themes, additional play sets are introduced over time as in-app purchases. In January 2024, all standalone apps were removed from the Apple Appstore and Google Play Store. On 30 June 2024, all standalone apps were removed from the Amazon Appstore.

A web series based on the game, under the title Toca Life Stories, was released on 21 February 2020 on Toca Boca's official YouTube channel. It focused on four close friends with mismatched personalities, Rita, Zeke, Nari, and Leon (the main characters in the Toca Life app series), on a quest to vanquish boredom in their neighborhood of OK Street (based on one of the towns found in Toca Boca World). It aired on some television stations such as Disney Channel France in France, Pop in the United Kingdom, and Cartoon Network in the United States.

=== Toca Boca Days ===
On 30 April 2024, Toca Boca Days was announced. The game is poised as a significant departure from previous entries in the Toca Life series, utilising a 3D world with multiplayer functionality. On 2 May 2024, Toca began rolling the game out in early access for Australia and New Zealand. The online functionality of Toca Boca Days ended on 25 August 2025, with the developers shifting focus to other titles.

=== Other games ===
On 15 November 2025, Toca Boca Jr Classics was realsed and it was also on Piknik.

On 5 October 2023, Toca Boca announced that they would be delisting and merging most of their smaller and older titles into one app titled Toca Boca Jr, as part of a new subscription service targeted towards preschoolers called Piknik.

== Awards and honors ==
Toca Boca has won the following awards:

2025

- Kidscreen Award Winner, Best Alternative Game: Toca Boca World

2022

- Kidscreen Award Winner, Best Game App—Original: Toca Life World

2021

- App Store Awards Winner: iPhone App of the Year: Toca Life World

2020

- Webby Award Winner in the Apps and Software category, Family & Kids 2020: Toca Life World

2019

- Kidscreen Award Nominee, Best Game App—Original: Toca Mystery House
- Parent's Choice, Silver Award: Toca Life: World

2018

- Fas Company, Innovation by Design: Toca Lab: Plants
- KAPi Best Children's App (older kids): Toca Life: Hospital
- Parent's Choice, Silver Award: Toca Life: World
- Kidscreen Award Nominee, Best Game App—Original: Toca Life: Hospital

2017

- Kidscreen Award in Best Video Streaming Platform for TocaTV

2015

- Webby Award Finalist in the Mobile Sites & Apps category for Toca Nature
- 2015 BolognaRagazzi Digital Award Mention for Toca Nature
- iKids Award 2015: Best Learning App - Tablet for Toca Lab

2014

- Cinekid App of the Year for Toca Pet Doctor
- The National Parenting Publications Award (NAPPA) for Toca Town (Silver)
- The Lovie Award Silver Winner in the Mobile & Applications category for Toca Lab
- Junior Design Awards 2014, Shortlisted for Best Children's App
- App Store Best iPhone Apps of 2014 for Toca Lab
- App Store Best iPad Apps of 2014 for Toca Nature

2013

- BAFTA Children’s Award (Interactive – Adapted) for Toca Kitchen.
- The KAPI Award for Most Pioneering Team in Children's Technology
- Bestekinderapps.de Best Innovative Apps & Games for Kids 2013 for Toca Tailor and Toca Hair Salon Me
- TIFF (Toronto International Film Festival) Kids Audience Choice Favourite digiPlaySpace App Award for Toca Kitchen
- iKids Award 2013: Best Game App - 6 and Up for Toca Tailor
- Parents Choice Award for Toca Tailor (Gold), Toca Band (Gold), Toca Builders (Gold), Toca Train (Silver)

2012

- The National Parenting Publications Award (NAPPA) in the Virtual category for Toca Kitchen (gold) and Toca Train (honors)
- The Parents' Choice Awards for Toca Tea Party (gold), Toca Kitchen (gold), Toca Robot Lab (gold), and Toca Hair Salon (silver). Toca Boca was the only development studio in the mobile category to win three gold awards.

2011

- The Telenor Digital Prize
- The National Parenting Publications Award (NAPPA) for Toca Hair Salon (gold) in Children's Media / Virtual Category
