= Front d'action politique =

Front d'action politique (FRAP) was a municipal political party in Montreal, formed as a federation of workers' and citizens' committees in 1969.

In 1970, the "October Crisis of 1970" resulted in FRAP's civil liberties being suspended, as Prime Minister Pierre Trudeau suspected FRAP to be associated with the criminal actions of the FLQ (Front de Liberation du Quebec).

FRAP was concluded in 1971.

The most well known member of FRAP was Jack Layton, former leader of the Official Opposition and the New Democratic Party.
