= Bakugan (TV series) =

Television anime series

- Genre: Action comedy
- Written by: Isao Murayama
- Directed by: Kazuya Ichikawa
- Music by: Voodoo Highway
- Countries of origin: Japan; Canada
- Original language: English
- No. of seasons: 1
- No. of episodes: 26 (52 segments)

Production
- Production companies: Spin Master Entertainment; TMS Entertainment Co., Ltd.

Original release
- Network: Netflix
- Release: September 1, 2023 – January 8, 2024

Bakugan (Note: In Japanese: Bakugan: Battle Clan (爆丸バトルクラン, Bakugan Batoru Kuran)) is an anime television series that serves as a second reboot of the Bakugan franchise. The series is produced by Spin Master Entertainment and animated by TMS Entertainment.

The series premiered on Netflix in the United States on September 1, 2023. The series was removed from Netflix on January 7, 2025. It is currently available on the streaming service Kartoon Channel.

== Episodes ==
No. overall	No. in season	English Title Japanese Title	Original release date	Japanese air date
1	1a	"Fire in the Sky"; Transliteration: "Dan to Dorago no Deai" (Japanese: ダンとドラゴの出会い)	September 1, 2023 (NF) (Note: The first two episodes were previewed on Roblox on August 4, 2023.); September 23, 2023 (DXD)	Unaired (Note: The first two episodes were previewed on Roblox on August 4, 2023.)
2	1b	"Ready to Rampage"; Transliteration: "Nazo no Kyodai Bakugan" (Japanese: 謎の巨大爆丸)	September 1, 2023 (NF) (Note: The first two episodes were previewed on Roblox on August 4, 2023.); September 23, 2023 (DXD)	Unaired (Note: The first two episodes were previewed on Roblox on August 4, 2023.)
3	2a	"Tyrannosaurus Flex"	September 1, 2023 (NF); September 30, 2023 (DXD)	Unaired
4	2b	"Let There Be Lava"	September 1, 2023 (NF); September 30, 2023 (DXD)	Unaired
5	3a	"Bunch of Misfits"	September 1, 2023 (NF); October 7, 2023 (DXD)	Unaired
6	3b	"Brawl or Nothing"	September 1, 2023 (NF); October 7, 2023 (DXD)	Unaired
7	4a	"Rules Are Boring"	September 1, 2023 (NF); October 14, 2023 (DXD)	Unaired
8	4b	"A Handful of Gold!"	September 1, 2023 (NF); October 14, 2023 (DXD)	Unaired
9	5a	"MOD Alone"	September 1, 2023 (NF); October 21, 2023 (DXD)	Unaired
10	5b	"Throw Some Shade"	September 1, 2023 (NF); October 21, 2023 (DXD)	Unaired
11	6a	"Viva Corndogs"	September 1, 2023 (NF); October 28, 2023 (DXD)	Unaired
12	6b	"Hard Water"	September 1, 2023 (NF); October 28, 2023 (DXD)	Unaired
13	7a	"Octogan Wrong!"	September 1, 2023 (NF); November 4, 2023 (DXD)	Unaired
14	7b	"Eat Meat"	September 1, 2023 (NF); November 4, 2023 (DXD)	Unaired
15	8a	"The Sound of Pickles"	September 1, 2023 (NF); November 11, 2023 (DXD)	Unaired
16	8b	"Off the Radar"	September 1, 2023 (NF); November 11, 2023 (DXD)	Unaired
17	9a	"The Worst Idea of All"	September 1, 2023 (NF); November 18, 2023 (DXD)	Unaired
18	9b	"There Is No Dr. Raptor"	September 1, 2023 (NF); November 18, 2023 (DXD)	Unaired
19	10a	"Bombzookas Away"	September 1, 2023 (NF); November 25, 2023 (DXD)	Unaired
20	10b	"You're Welcome"	September 1, 2023 (NF); November 25, 2023 (DXD)	Unaired
21	11a	"Just Jump in"	September 1, 2023 (NF); December 2, 2023 (DXD)	Unaired
22	11b	"B.A.M. Boost"	September 1, 2023 (NF); December 2, 2023 (DXD)	Unaired
23	12a	"Terrible Bitter History"	September 1, 2023 (NF); December 9, 2023 (DXD)	Unaired
24	12b	"We're Great with Rodents!"	September 1, 2023 (NF); December 9, 2023 (DXD)	Unaired
25	13a	"For the Fate of the Misfit Clan"	September 1, 2023 (NF); December 16, 2023 (DXD)	Unaired
26	13b	"My Fingers Were Crossed!"	September 1, 2023 (NF); December 16, 2023 (DXD)	Unaired
27	14a	"Neutralizer Full Power!"	January 8, 2024 (NF); January 6, 2024 (DXD) (Note: New episodes restart on Disney XD on January 6, 2024.)	Unaired
28	14b	"Hello? Mr. Mask Guy..."	January 8, 2024 (NF); January 6, 2024 (DXD) (Note: New episodes restart on Disney XD on January 6, 2024.)	Unaired
29	15a	"Sorry Mia's Dad"	January 8, 2024 (NF); January 13, 2024 (DXD)	Unaired
30	15b	"Flown Off Course"	January 8, 2024 (NF); January 13, 2024 (DXD)	Unaired
31	16a	"The Best of the Best"	January 8, 2024 (NF); January 20, 2024 (DXD)	Unaired
32	16b	"We're All in Trouble"	January 8, 2024 (NF); January 20, 2024 (DXD)	Unaired
33	17a	"That Hit the Spot"	January 8, 2024 (NF); January 27, 2024 (DXD)	Unaired
34	17b	"Drink the Burn"	January 8, 2024 (NF); January 27, 2024 (DXD)	Unaired
35	18a	"Prank the Prankster"	January 8, 2024 (NF); February 3, 2024 (DXD)	Unaired
36	18b	"Thanks for the Support"	January 8, 2024 (NF); February 3, 2024 (DXD)	Unaired
37	19a	"Someone Stop Me!"	January 8, 2024 (NF); February 10, 2024 (DXD)	Unaired
38	19b	"I Can't Take It, I Can't!"	January 8, 2024 (NF); February 10, 2024 (DXD)	Unaired
39	20a	"Knocking on the Door of Your Mind"	January 8, 2024 (NF); February 17, 2024 (DXD)	Unaired
40	20b	"Can't Argue with That"	January 8, 2024 (NF); February 17, 2024 (DXD)	Unaired
41	21a	"The Secrets, The Lies"	January 8, 2024 (NF); February 24, 2024 (DXD)	Unaired
42	21b	"Sayonara, Misfit Clan"	January 8, 2024 (NF); February 24, 2024 (DXD)	Unaired
43	22a	"A New Future"	January 8, 2024 (NF); March 2, 2024 (DXD)	Unaired
44	22b	"I Missed Breakfast"	January 8, 2024 (NF); March 2, 2024 (DXD)	Unaired
45	23a	"His Strength Is Now Our Strength"	January 8, 2024 (NF); March 9, 2024 (DXD)	Unaired
46	23b	"Broke This World"	January 8, 2024 (NF); March 9, 2024 (DXD)	Unaired
47	24a	"Thunder Crunch of the Misfit Clan"	January 8, 2024 (NF); March 16, 2024 (DXD)	Unaired
48	24b	"Seek Shelter Immediately"	January 8, 2024 (NF); March 16, 2024 (DXD)	Unaired
49	25a	"Don't Fight For Me"	January 8, 2024 (NF); March 23, 2024 (DXD)	Unaired
50	25b	"Destroy It All!"	January 8, 2024 (NF); March 23, 2024 (DXD)	Unaired
51	26a	"Lesser Lifeforms"	January 8, 2024 (NF); March 30, 2024 (DXD)	Unaired
52	26b	"Exploding Sphere"	January 8, 2024 (NF); March 30, 2024 (DXD)	Unaired

== Characters ==
=== Human ===
- Dan Kouzo – voiced by Mike Taylor (English), Himari Mochida^{Ep. 01 credits} (Japanese)
- Griffin Tessly – voiced by Sephira Kalala Ilunga Bukasa (English), Kazuki Miyagi^{Ep. 01 credits} (Japanese)
- Mia Ono – voiced by Kaya Kanashiro (English), Ruka Yashiro ^{Ep. 01 credits} (Japanese)
- Juno Reyes – voiced by Julia Pulo (English)
- Andrew (Thunder Crunch) by Desmond Sivan (English)
- Chip – voiced by Matt Folliott (English)
- Kage – voiced by Carson Gale (English)
- Backslash – voiced by Tyler Barish (English)
- Ace – voiced by Jamie Joe Gonzaga (English)
- Vakar/V – voiced by Ali Badshah (English)

=== Bakugan ===
- Dragonoid – voiced by Kyle Derek (English)
- Trox – voiced by Doug Hadders (English)
- Ventri – voiced by Christina Nova (English)
- Nillious – voiced by Allan Turner (English)

== Development ==
On June 16, 2023, a trailer for a new Bakugan anime series was released on YouTube. The first two episodes were previewed on Roblox on August 4, 2023.

The series debuted in North America in September 2023; premiering in the United States on Netflix on September 1, 2023, and Disney XD on September 23.

Internationally, the series premiered on Pop in the United Kingdom on September 4, 9Go! in Australia on September 30, Disney XD Canada on October 22, sibling channel YTV on November 17, 2023,; and Okto in Singapore on January 5, 2024.
