= Air Hogs =

Toy line

Storm Launcher

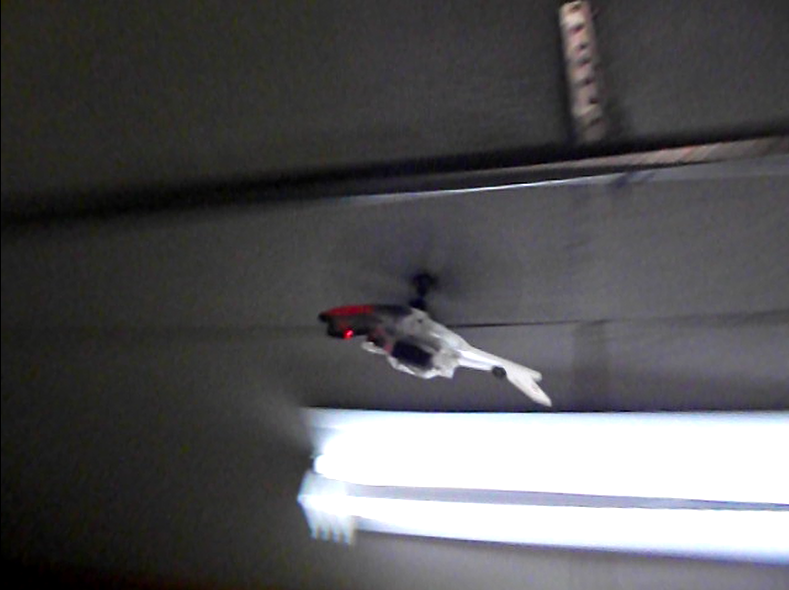
An Air Hogs Sharp Shooter in flight

Storm Launcher Mini

Air Hogs is a line of toy airplanes, helicopters, rockets, and cars manufactured and owned by the Spin Master company of Toronto, Ontario, Canada. They are radio controlled, free-flying, and air-powered aircraft. Several of these, especially the remote-controlled (R/C) ones, are designed to be easily flown without any need for assembly.

Air Hogs was created in 1996 by British inventors John Dixon and Peter Manning, whose prototype of a compressed air powered toy airplane had been rejected by everyone they had shown it to. Excited by the plane's potential, Spin Master licensed the technology and hired a renowned toy invention, design and development company in Chicago owned by Steve and Jeff Rehkemper where an extensive prototyping and engineering effort was conducted using sophisticated CAD engineering software and CNC machining of fresh engine parts and foam fuselages each day after crashing prototypes time and time again until the design was optimized. Spinmaster and the Rehkempers along with their friend and factory owner in China, William Babbs spent two years and half a million dollars perfecting the toy.

The Air Hogs Sky Shark debuted first in spring 1998 and was an immediate hit, fuelled by coverage on The Today Show and Live with Regis and Kathy Lee, as well as write-ups in Time and Popular Science.

Follow-up successes have included Zero Gravity RC Wall Crawler (a radio control Hummer-style vehicle that can be driven up walls), the popular Aero Ace battery powered RC airplanes, Air Hogs Stormlauncher (a vehicle that can operate on land, water, and can fly), Havoc Heli (a 6.5” long indoor RC helicopter weighing just 10 grams) and the Reflex Helicopter (indoor/outdoor fully functional r/c helicopter). Later on, The Stinger was released. In 2008, the Havoc Heli and Stinger were released together in a Laser Battle Pack. A new toy has also been released: the SwitchBlade; a twisting blade with smaller blades that launches vertically but flies straight forward. Another popular radio-control airplane is the Hawkeye Blue Sky, which was released in 2011. It is the only airplane Air Hogs has built with a built-in spy camera. (There are a few indoor helicopters that have them, but no other airplanes.)
