= Frenetic random activity periods =

Burst of energy in dogs and cats

Frenetic random activity periods (FRAPs), also colloquially known as zoomies, midnight crazies, or mad half-hours, are random bursts of energy occurring in dogs and cats in which they run frenetically, commonly in circles. They usually last a few minutes or less. It is not known what causes animals to engage in FRAPs. Some veterinary experts have noticed that FRAPs are often associated with times of transition, such as the return of an owner. Other domesticated animals such as rabbits and pigs, and wild animals such as ferrets and elephants, are also known to experience FRAPs.

Although little data exists regarding the safety of FRAPs, ethologist Marc Bekoff has suggested that dogs should be allowed to freely engage in them as long as the dog is in a safe area and will not harm others or themselves. Likewise, FRAPs are normal and healthy behavior for cats as well.

== Description ==
FRAPs are characterized by an abrupt onset of rapid, seemingly random movement. Typical features include running at top speed, rapid turns and spins (sometimes in tight circles), jumps and sudden stops, and brief vocalizations or tail-posture changes. Episodes usually last from a few seconds up to several minutes and end as abruptly as they began. FRAPs most often occur when an animal is in a familiar environment (indoors or in a fenced yard) and appear to be self-terminating (the animal often lies down or settles immediately afterwards). FRAPs are common in puppies and kittens but occur in animals of all ages. Recurring contexts in which FRAPs are commonly observed include immediately after elimination, following bathing, at dawn or dusk, during or after play, when an animal has just been released from confinement, or upon the return of an owner. These associations are observational rather than causal, and the proximate triggers for individual episodes are not fully understood.

== Hypotheses ==
- Energy discharge: FRAPs may be a rapid release of pent-up physical energy after a period of rest or confinement.
- Emotional expression (positive arousal): Some ethologists suggest FRAPs express excitement, joy or a positive arousal state (for instance after greeting an owner or successful play). Marc Bekoff, among others, interprets many such episodes as play-related and pleasurable.
- Ontogenetic / practice function: In young animals, frantic bursts of activity may be part of normal motor and behavioural development, allowing practice of locomotor and predatory skills.

== See also ==
- Weasel War Dance
