= Expandable water toy =

Type of toy made from superabsorbent polymers

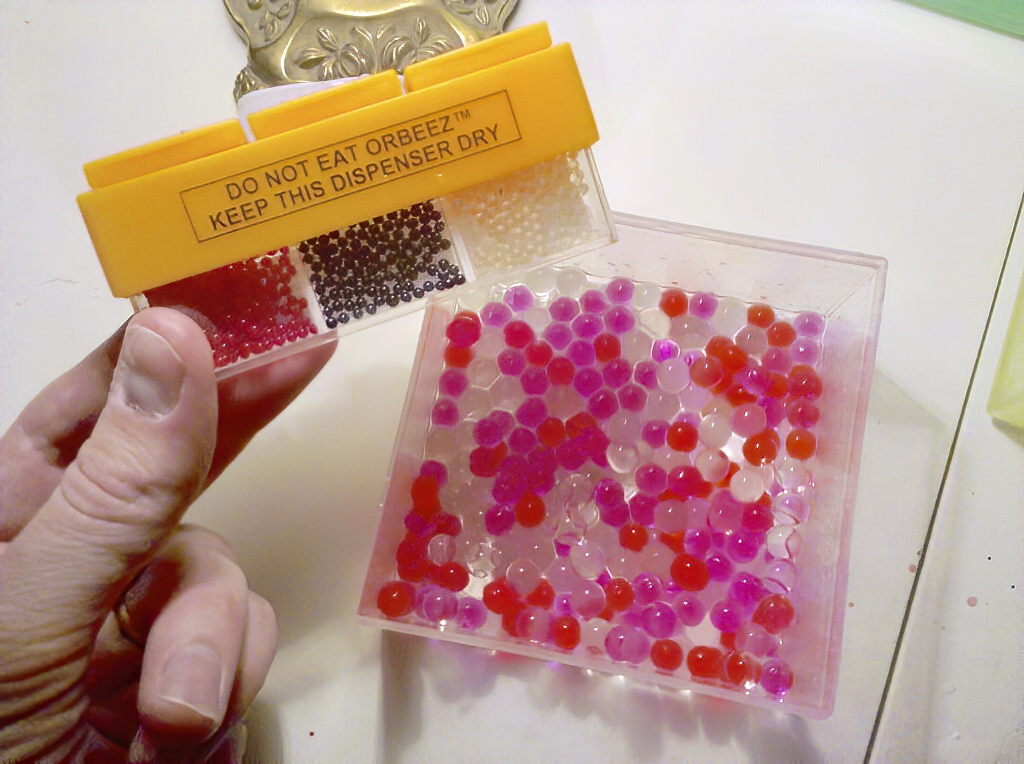
Orbeez water beads, before and after being added to water

Expandable water toys (also grow-in-water toys or grow monsters) are novelty items made from a superabsorbent polymer. They are toys that expand after putting them into water for anything from a few hours up to several days, depending on size. They shrink in saltwater or when exposed to air. They are made from polymers that can absorb and retain extremely large amounts of a liquid relative to their own mass.

== Description ==
Water Balz look like marbles, but expand to 57 millimetres (2.2 in), the size of a racquetball, in water.

Orbeez expand to 14 millimetres (0.55 in) in water.

Expandable water toys are also sold in the shapes of other things, such as dinosaurs, sharks, people or mechas from popular anime. Many of the companies that distribute them are Chinese and Dutch trading companies.

== History ==
The introduction and popularity of these toys has followed the development of superabsorbent polymers. In the early 1970s, the superabsorbent polymer was used commercially for the first time for disposable hygienic products. The first product markets were feminine sanitary napkins and adult incontinence products. The development of superabsorbent technology and performance has been largely led by demands in the disposable hygiene segment. Strides in absorption performance have allowed the development of the ultra-thin baby diaper which uses a fraction of the materials – particularly fluff pulp – that earlier disposable diapers consumed. Over the years, technology has progressed so that there is little if any starch-grafted superabsorbent polymer used in disposable hygienic products. These superabsorbents typically are cross-linked acrylic homo-polymers (usually sodium neutralized).

== Risks and recalls ==
Larger versions of the expandable toys can become lodged in the guts of children. Water Balz and Orbeez have been swallowed and lodged in the guts of children, requiring surgery to remove. A 2012 paper documented the case of an infant who had swallowed a 1 centimetre (0.39 in) "Water Balz" product, which grew to "the size of a golf ball" in her digestive tract, requiring surgery to remove it. Orbeez states that their product expands to only 7 millimetres (0.28 in) in the intestines if swallowed and will pass through the digestive tract, but that it is a choking hazard and is unsuitable for children under five.

Starting from 15 January 2007 there have been several recalls on these toys. Ireland, Poland, Cyprus, Lithuania, Hungary and the United Kingdom have recalled the Magic Grow Reptile and Dinosaur Eggs Wild World due to a choking risk. In the United Kingdom, an expanding spider toy was recalled in 2010 for not complying with the European standard EN 71, in that the toy's legs could be broken off and swallowed, expanding in the stomach.

In 2022, the "Orbeez Challenge" encouraged people to shoot one at strangers with gel-ball guns, or airsoft guns, filled with Orbeez. Several people were arrested for participating in this challenge.
