= Magna Doodle =

Magnetic drawing toy

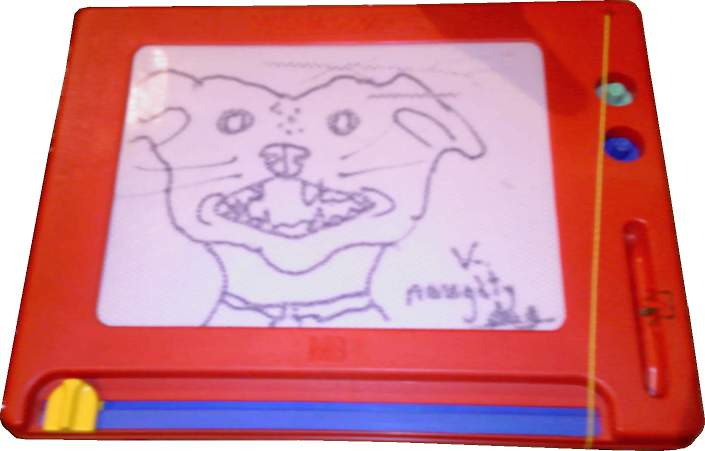
A Magna Doodle drawing board

Magna Doodle is a magnetic drawing toy, consisting of a drawing board, a magnetic stylus, and a few magnet shapes. Invented in 1974 by Pilot Corporation, over forty million units have been sold to date worldwide, under several brands, product names and variations, including Tyco and Mattel/Fisher Price.

== How it works ==
Principle of operation of a Magna Doodle board: 1. Erasing; 2. Writing

The key element of the toy is the magnetophoretic display panel, filled with a thick, opaque white liquid containing tiny dark magnetic particles. These particles can be drawn to the drawing surface by a magnet-tipped stylus or optionally provided shapes, or removed to the hidden back side by a sliding eraser bar. The middle layer is divided into a honeycomb of cells, keeping the liquid static and the particles evenly distributed across the panel. The liquid is formulated so that the floating particles can be pulled through it in response to the magnetic forces, but not due to gravity.

== Brand ==
The toy was originally invented at Pilot Corporation, which registered "Magna Doodle" as a trademark in the U.S. in 1986, and has owned the underlying rights to the brand ever since.

Magna Doodle toys were produced under license by Tyco, using panels produced by Pilot, until 1997, when Tyco was purchased by Mattel. Mattel then sold the toy under its Fisher-Price brand. Following a dispute over the price of the panels, Mattel ended the licence agreement in 2003, but then began selling a new product called the Doodle Pro which used third-party panels and similar packaging. This led to Pilot suing Mattel unsuccessfully in 2004 for infringement of its trademark and trade dress, while relicensing the brand to the Ohio Art Company. Ohio Art, in turn, eventually dropped the license as well, later producing the similar Doodle Sketch until 2016 when it sold that brand along with Etch A Sketch to Spin Master.

The current licensee of the Magna Doodle brand is Cra-Z-Art.

== In popular culture ==
In the TV comedy Friends, a Magna Doodle is visible in Joey and Chandler's apartment, with various messages written on it throughout the series, referencing plot points, current events, inside crew jokes, or just random drawings.

A version of the Magna Doodle was used in the 1990s game show Nick Arcade during their "Video Challenge" games. Before the challenge would begin, a contestant would write on the drawing board how many of the team's points they would risk on their teammate being able to successfully complete the challenge. The wager was kept secret until after the challenge ended.

== CD-ROM version ==
In 1999, Mattel Media released a CD-ROM version for Windows-PCs. AllGame gave the product a rating of 1.5 out of 5, writing: "Magna Doodle is completely unenjoyable. Mattel Media has taken a terrific toy and stripped it of any real fun."

== See also ==
- Etch A Sketch, a somewhat similar toy using a different principle of operation
