= Betty Spaghetty =

Bendable rubber doll released in 1998

- Type: Fashion doll
- Invented by: Elonne Dantzer
- Company: Ohio Art Company (1998-2004, 2007-2008); Moose Toys (2016-2017)
- Country: United States
- Availability: 1998-2004, 2007-2008, 2016–2017

Betty Spaghetty was a bendable rubber doll from the Ohio Art Company. She is portrayed as a fun-loving youth. She has two best friends named Zoe and Hannah and a younger sister. Her features include rubbery, pasta-like hair used to let children make different hairstyles and changeable hands, feet, shoes, etc. The doll was targeted at girls ages 4 and up. Some models came with accessories, such as a cell phone, a laptop computer, and in-line skates.

== History ==
Betty Spaghetty was invented and designed by Elonne Dantzer and licensed to The Ohio Art Co. and released in 1998. The doll was very popular during its launch, however the line was discontinued in 2004 due to Ohio Art's toy shipments falling to 15% due to weak retail markets and strong competition in the fashion doll market. But in 2007, Ohio Art announced that the dolls would return with a new look. The new Betty Spaghetty dolls were released later that year, but were discontinued a second time a year later due to lackluster sales. Moose Toys revealed at the 2016 Toy Fair that Betty Spaghetty would be sold as part of their brand in Fall 2016.

== Lines ==
=== Betty Spaghetty "Around the World" Sets ===
- Betty Tours London - Lucy and Betty
- Betty In Paris - Betty and Nikki
- Betty In Australia - Tess and Betty
- Betty's On Broadway - Olivia and Betty
- Betty Goes To Hollywood - Mandy and Betty
- Around the World Travel Set

=== Other Sets ===
- Slumber Party - Zoe, Betty, and Hannah
- Campfire Fun n' Friends! - Zoe and Celeste
- Go For The Goal! Kristyn
- Hittin' The Slopes! - Betty and Zoe
- Schoolin' Around - Betty and Haley
- Makin' The Scene - Betty, Zoe, and Hannah
- Horsin' Around - Betty and her horse, Dakota
- School Daze - Betty and Hannah
- Solar Ace In Space - Betty and Solar Eclipse
- Glo Crazy! - Betty
- Fun at the Beach - Betty and Zoe
- Shop 'til you Drop - Zoe, Betty, and Hannah
- Ready to Party Backpack - Betty and Zoe
- Fancy Party - Betty and Zoe
- Betty Spaghetty's Birthday
- Hannah's Birthday
- Zoe's Birthday
- Betty's Closet
- Zoe's Closet
- Hannah's Closet
- Betty's Beauty Bag
- Designer Girl book with Doll
- Mall Makeover Madness - Betty and Hannah
- Cats Rule! - Zoe and Chloe
- Dog's Rock! - Betty and Jill
- Betty's Bike - Betty and Jack

=== Betty Spaghetty DOO's ===
- Betty's Spaghetty DOO's
- Zoe's Spaghetty DOO's
- Hannah's Spaghetty DOO's

=== Sibling Sets ===
- Big Brother Little Brother - Adam and Josh
- My Little Sis Learn to Skate - Ally and Betty
- My Little Sis Learn to Skate - Emily and Hannah
- My Little Sis Tea Party - Ally and Betty
- My Little Sis Tea Party - Emily and Hannah
- My Baby Sis Oh, Baby! - Katy and Betty

=== Makin' A Splash ===
- Makin' A Splash - Rebecca
- Makin' A Splash - Zoe
- Makin' A Splash - Hannah
