= Art Company =

Art Company may refer to:

- The Art Company, a name sometimes used by Dutch band VOF de Kunst
- Ohio Art Company
