= Lego case =

These court cases are informally known as the Lego case:

- Interlego AG v Tyco Industries Inc — a Hong Kong case that went before the Judicial Committee of the Privy Council
- Kirkbi AG v Ritvik Holdings Inc — a case that went before the Supreme Court of Canada
