= U.S. 1 (comics) =

U.S. Archer
- U.S. 1 #1 (May, 1983)

Publication information
- Publisher: Marvel Comics
- First appearance: U.S. 1 #1 (May, 1983)
- Created by: Al Milgrom, Herb Trimpe

In-story information
- Alter ego: Ulysses Solomon Archer
- Notable aliases: U.S. 1, US Ace
- Abilities: College-level engineer Skilled driver Proeficient fighter Metal-plated skull

U.S. 1 is a Marvel Comics comic book series that was published from 1983 to 1984. The series was produced based on a license of the US-1 Trucks line of slot truck toys from Tyco Toys.

== Publication history ==
U.S. 1 lasted for 12 issues (May 1983 - October 1984). It was among the first line of titles edited by Ralph Macchio, and Bob Harras later worked on the title. Al Milgrom wrote the series, with artwork provided by Marvel veterans Herb Trimpe, Frank Springer and Steve Ditko.

== Characters ==
- Ulysses Solomon Archer (U.S. Archer), the main character of the series.
- Mary McGrill, waitress at the Short Stop Diner. She also had an alternate personality, the villainess Midnight, who used a mind-controlling bullwhip.
- Ed "Poppa Wheelie" Wheeler and "Wide Load Annie" Wheeler, operators of the Short Stop Diner.
- Jefferson Archer (Highwayman), U.S.'s brother who turned to evil.
- Baron Von Blimp, a villain based out of a dirigible.

== Reception ==
According to Kurt Busiek, US1 is considered the book that broke the "Marvel Zombie". The term had been coined by retailer Cliff Biggers, to describe fans who complained to retailers or wrote letters to Marvel saying the Epic Comics series Groo the Wanderer should be canceled because they did not like it, but had to buy it because it was a Marvel comic. Once they read US1 and decided not to order it anymore, Marvel Zombies no longer bought everything reflexively, and started dropping other titles as well. US1 may have been the first book to drop below 100,000 copies sold per issue, and once it broke that line, other books followed.

Screen Rant described Ulysses Archer (and series villain The Highwayman) as one of the superheroes that Marvel wants readers to forget. Comic Book Resources described it as "one of Marvel's silliest comics".
