= André Cassagnes =

French inventor

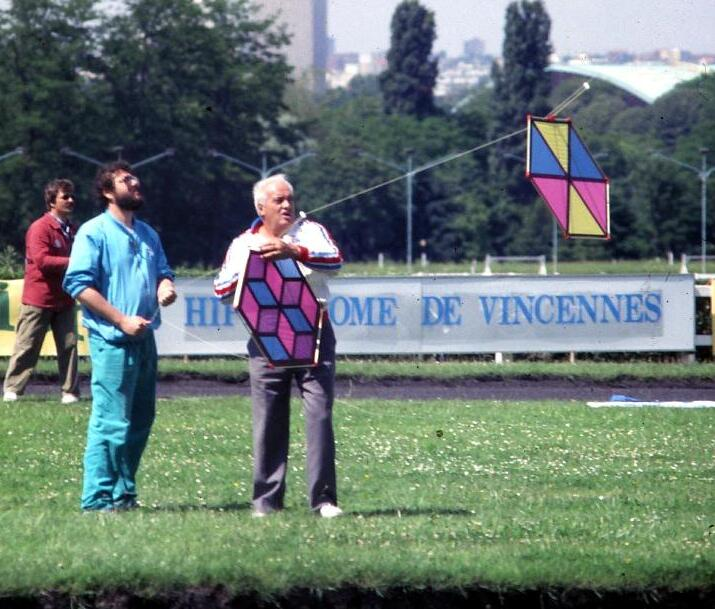
- Cassagnes in 1987, launching a kite
- Born: 23 September 1926; Montrouge southern suburbs of Paris, France
- Died: 16 January 2013 (aged 86); Villejuif southern suburbs of Paris, France
- Known for: Etch A Sketch

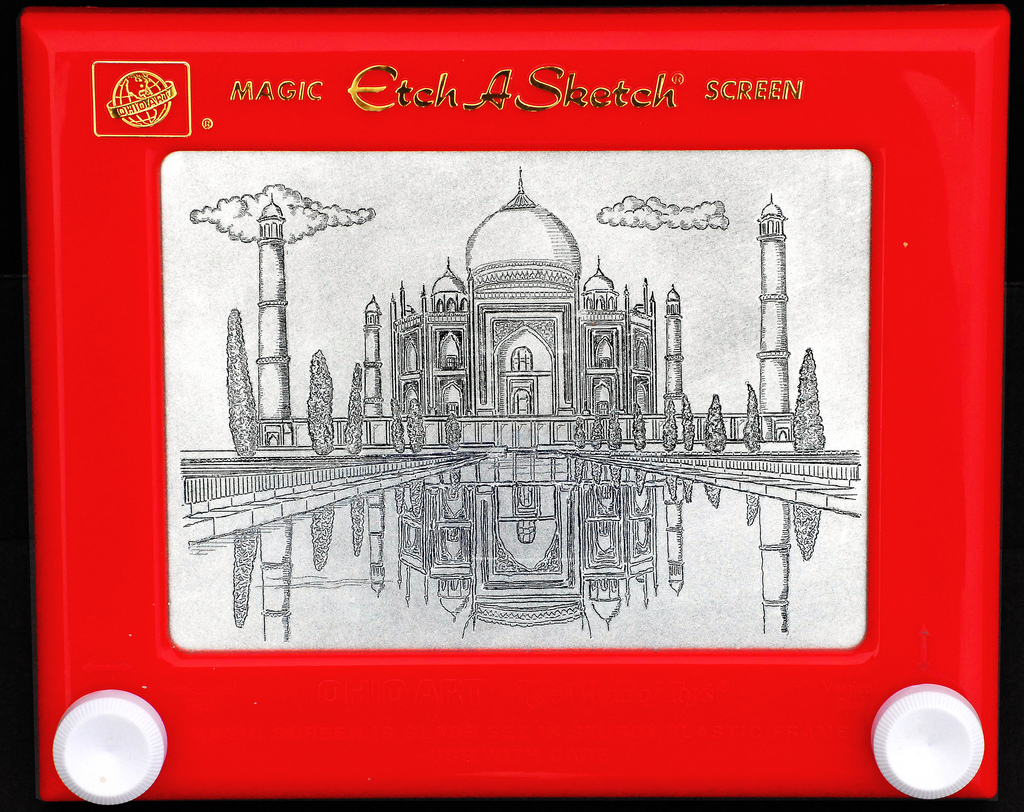
A model of Etch A Sketch created by André Cassagnes.

André Cassagnes (23 September 1926 – 16 January 2013) was a French inventor, electrical technician, toymaker, and kite designer. Cassagnes is best known as the inventor of the Etch A Sketch, a popular mechanical drawing toy manufactured since 2016 by Spin Master, formerly by the Ohio Art Company.

Cassagnes was born outside Paris, on 23 September 1926. His parents owned and operated a bakery, where he worked as a teenager. An allergy to flour forced him to seek another line of work, and he became an electrician for the Lincrusta Company, a French manufacturer which produced picture frame covers using an aluminium powder.

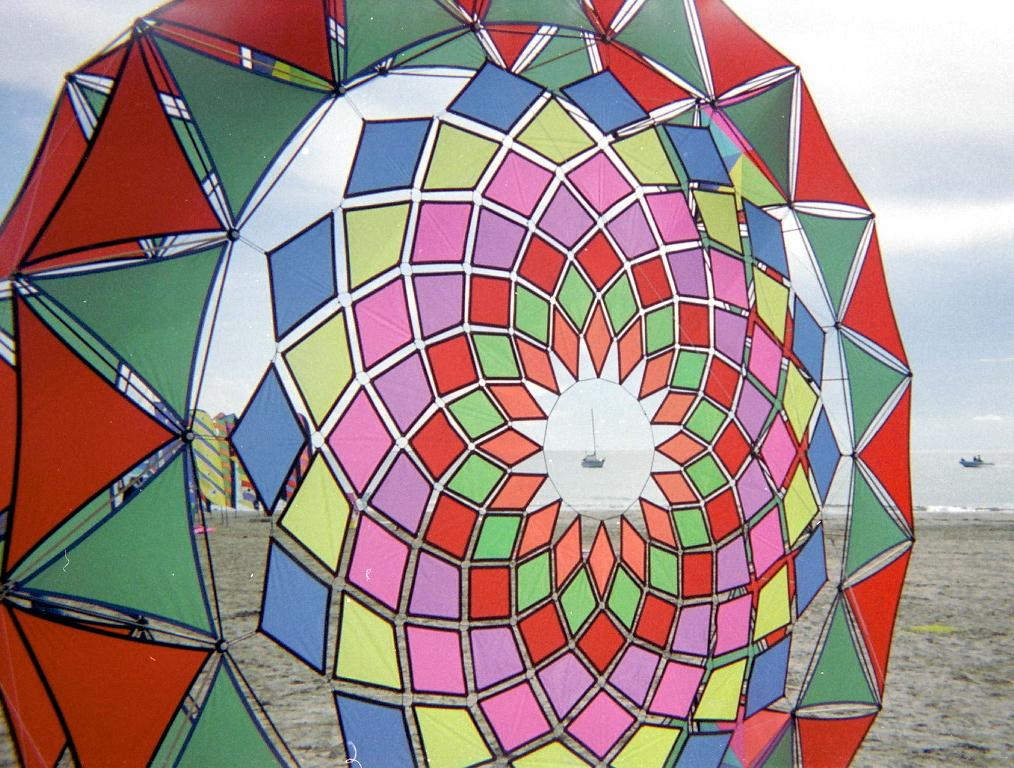
Detail of a modular kite of the type popularized by André Cassagnes

In one instance, Cassagnes was performing a routine installation of a factory light switch plate. The plate was wrapped in a translucent decal covering. During the installation, Cassagnes removed the decal and wrote on it with a pencil. He quickly noticed that image transferred to the opposite face of the decal. Cassagnes tinkered with his discovery, which led to the world's first prototype of the Etch A Sketch. He called his invention L'Ecran Magique lit. 'the magic screen'. The toy was first unveiled in 1959 at the Nuremberg Toy Fair in Nuremberg, West Germany. Cassagnes later partnered with the American manufacturer Ohio Art Company to further develop the Etch a Sketch into its familiar form. The Ohio Art Company launched the Etch a Sketch in the United States during the 1960 holiday season.

Cassagnes was also a well-known kite designer and inventor in France. This was his main occupation but remained a hobby; he specialized in the creation of original modular kites throughout the 1980s. A 1992 article in Kite Lines magazine described him then as "the most famous kitemaker in France". He also invented several mechanical games: the Teleguide, which guides metal cars onto a track; and the SkeDoodle, a conceptual toy in which users draw images onto a globe-shaped screen.

Cassagnes died in a suburb of Paris on 16 January 2013, at the age of 86, according to a report from the Toy Industry Association (TIA). He was survived by his wife, Renée, and their three children.
