= Jean de Beaugrand =

French lineographer and mathematician (1584–1640)

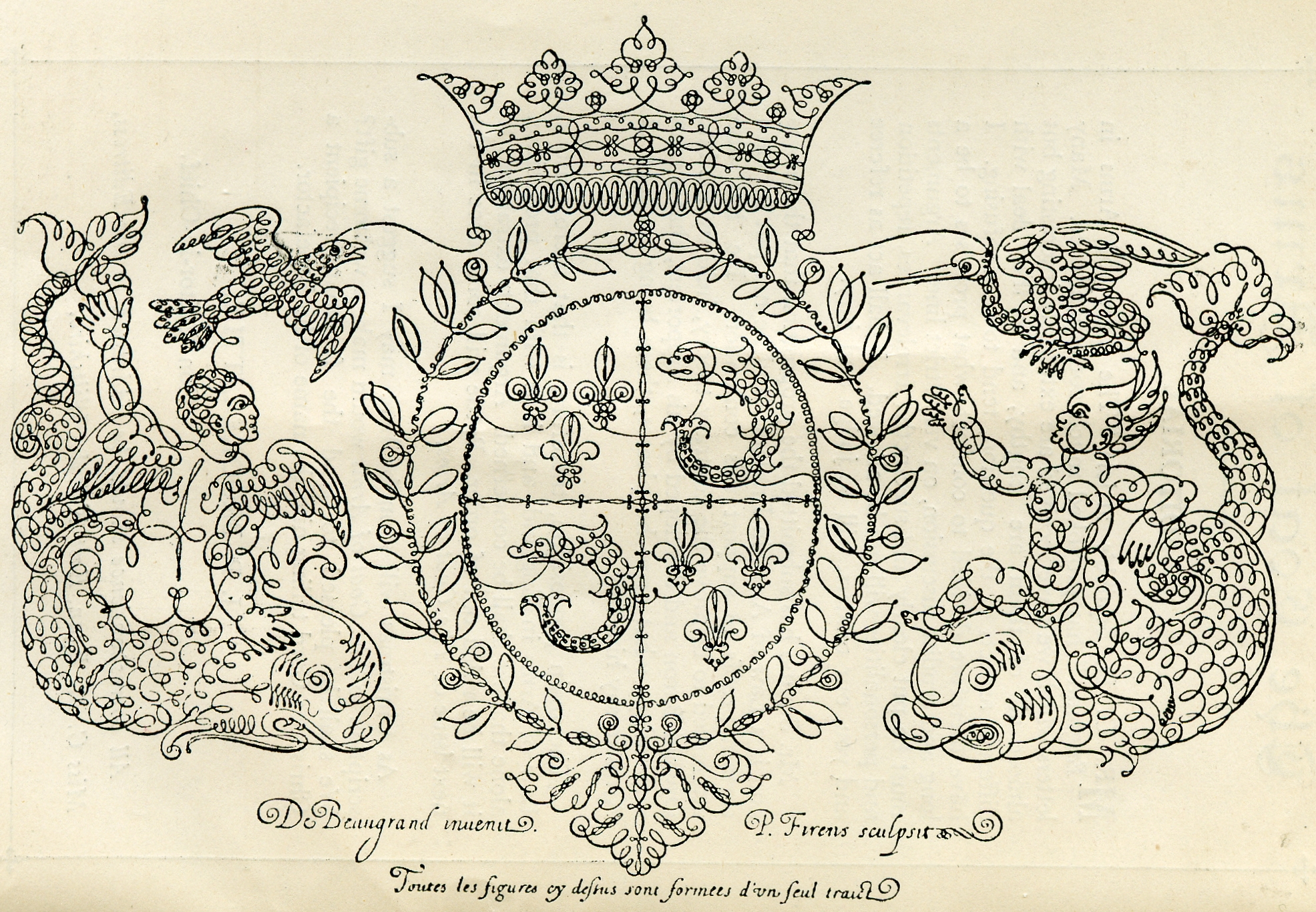
A lineographic representation of the arms of the Dauphin of France. The arms were created by Jean de Beaugrand in 1604.

Jean de Beaugrand (1584 – 22 December 1640) was the foremost French lineographer of the seventeenth century. Though born in Mulhouse (then part of the Old Swiss Confederacy), de Beaugrand moved to Paris in 1581. He also worked as a mathematician and published works on geostatics. He is credited with naming the cycloid. He lived and worked in Paris as an artist until his death in 1640.

== Bibliography ==
- D Diderot, Encyclopédie, First edition, Book 4, 596.
- George Hanton, French Lineography, Gregory Kline Books, New York, 1927.
- H Nathan, Biography in Dictionary of Scientific Biography (New York 1970–1990).
- P Humbert, Les Astronomers français de 1610 à 1667, Société d'études scientifiques et archéologiques de Draguignan, Memoires 63 (1942), 1-72.
