= Etch A Sketch =

Mechanical drawing toy

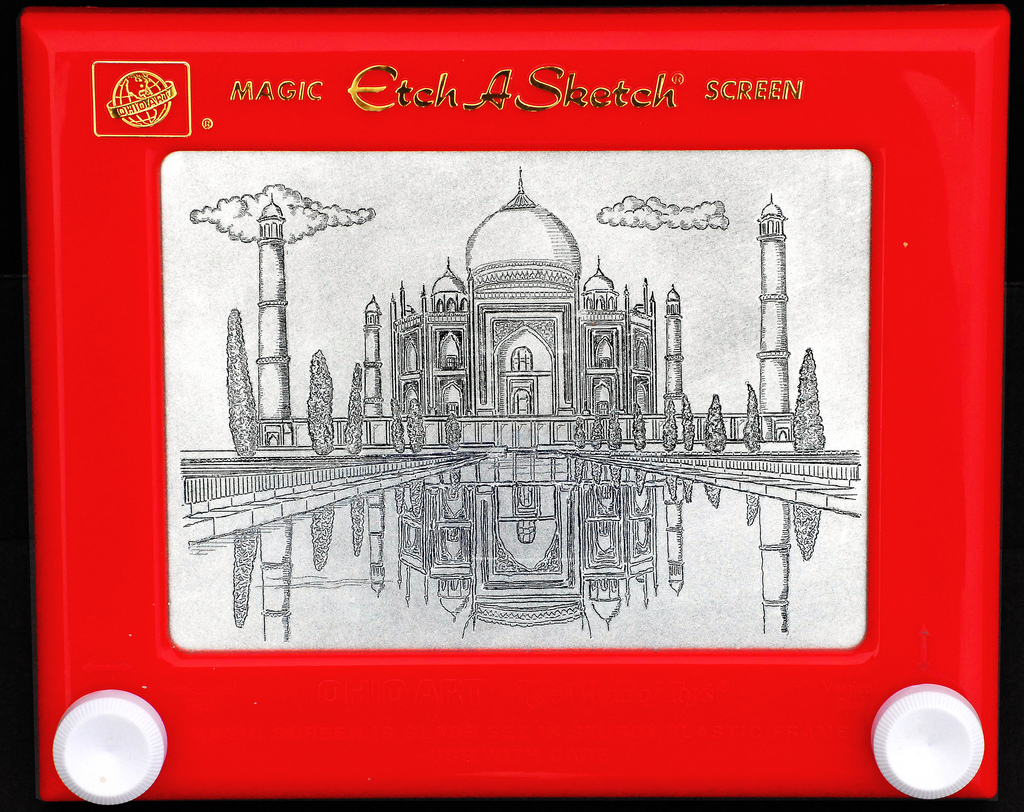
- Taj Mahal drawn on the Etch-a-Sketch
- Type: Drawing toy
- Invented by: André Cassagnes
- Company: Ohio Art Company (1960–2016); Spin Master (2016–present)
- Country: France
- Availability: 1960–present
- Materials: Aluminium dust
- Official website

Etch A Sketch is a brand of mechanical drawing toy manufactured by the Ohio Art Company, invented by André Cassagnes of France. It is now owned by Spin Master of Canada.

An Etch A Sketch has a thick, flat gray screen in a red plastic frame. There are two white knobs on the front of the frame in the lower corners. Twisting the knobs moves a stylus that displaces aluminium powder on the back of the screen, leaving a solid line. The knobs create lineographic images. The left control moves the stylus horizontally, and the right one moves it vertically.

The Etch A Sketch was introduced near the peak of the Baby Boom on July 12, 1960, for $2.99 (equivalent to $33 in 2025). It went on to sell 600,000 units that year and is one of the best known toys of that era. In 1998, it was inducted into the National Toy Hall of Fame at The Strong, in Rochester, New York. In 2003, the Toy Industry Association named Etch A Sketch one of the 100 most memorable toys of the 20th century. The Etch A Sketch has since sold over 100 million units worldwide.

== Mechanism ==
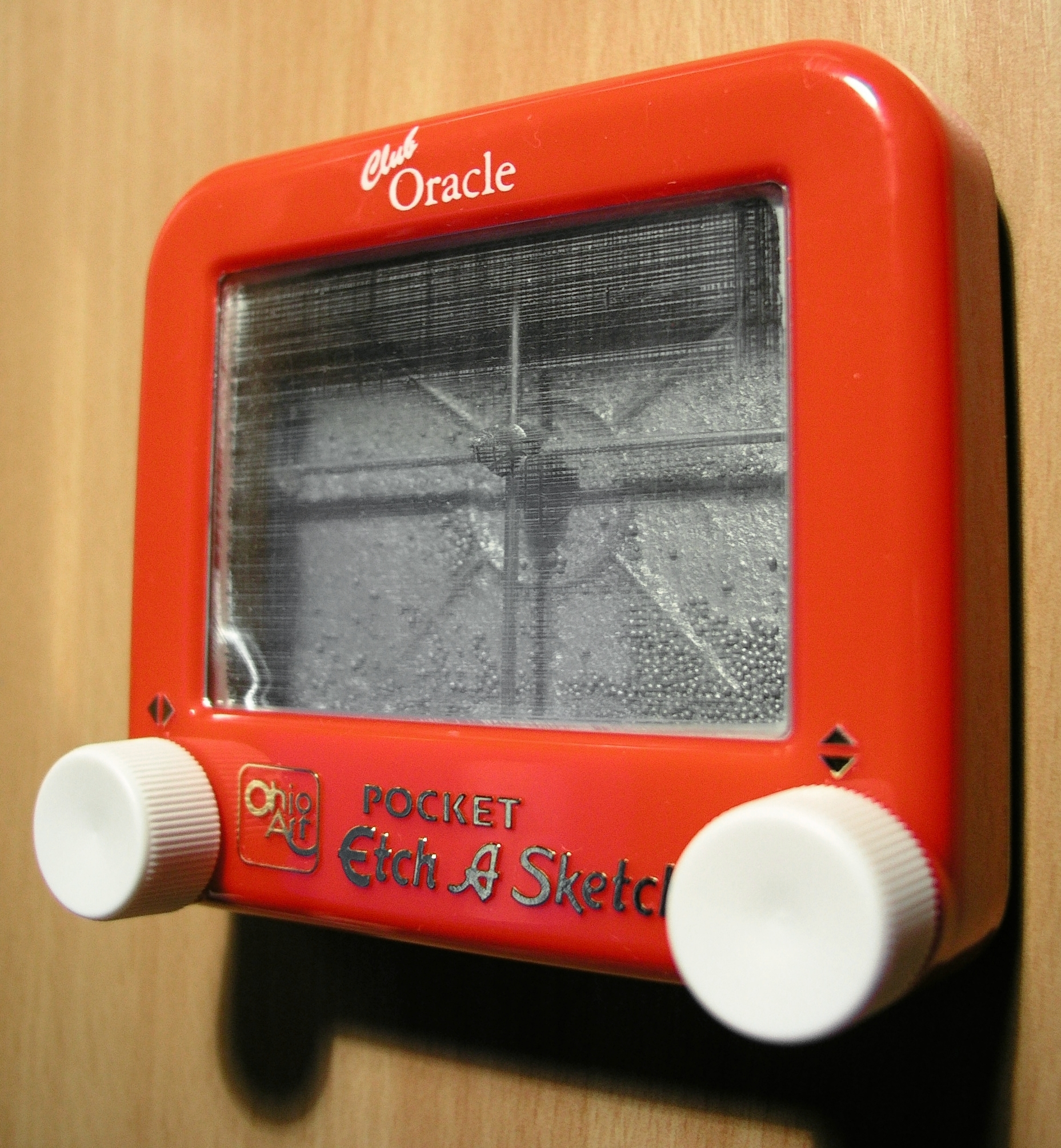
Pocket Etch A Sketch showing mechanism

The numbered components correspond to those that move the stylus horizontally, and the lettered components to those that move it vertically.

The device has ten pulleys, six cables, two rails, and a stylus.

Pulley 1 (single-groove) connects to pulley 2 (triple-groove) via a short infinite reciprocating cable. Pulley 2 connects to 3 (double-groove) via a longer reciprocating cable attached along its upper course to one end of the vertical rail (6), and then a third cable runs from 2 to 3, 4, and 5 (4 and 5 are single-groove) via another much longer loop of cable between 4 and 5 to the other end of the vertical rail.

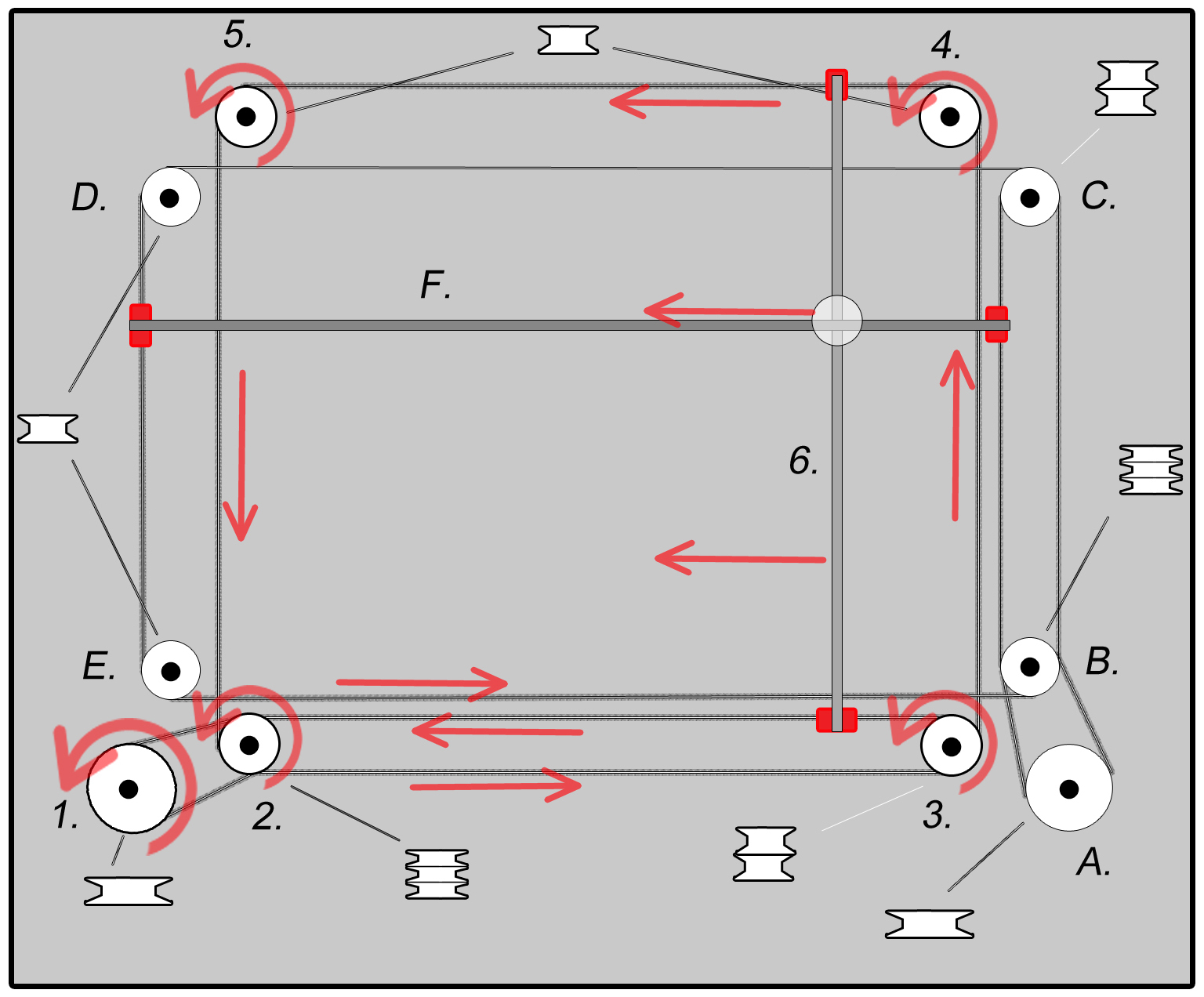
Basic mechanism of operating a two-dimensional plotter. The numbered components move the stylus horizontally, while the lettered components move it vertically.

Likewise, A connects to B, B connects to C and attaches to the horizontal rail (F), and finally B connects to C, D, and E, attaching to F at its other end between D and E.

Turning pulley 1 counterclockwise makes 2 rotate the same way, and this makes all pulleys connected to 2 (3, 4, and 5) do the same. The rail these cables connect to (6, connection points marked in red) moves to the left with the cables attached at each end, making the stylus move in the same direction along the other rail (F). Clockwise movement of pulley 1 has the opposite effect.

Pulleys A–E operate the same as 1–5, and act on the horizontal rail (F) to slide the stylus up and down along the vertical one (6).

The pulley system connects the knobs to the two orthogonal rails on which the stylus is mounted, allowing the stylus to move horizontally and vertically across the screen.

== Operation ==
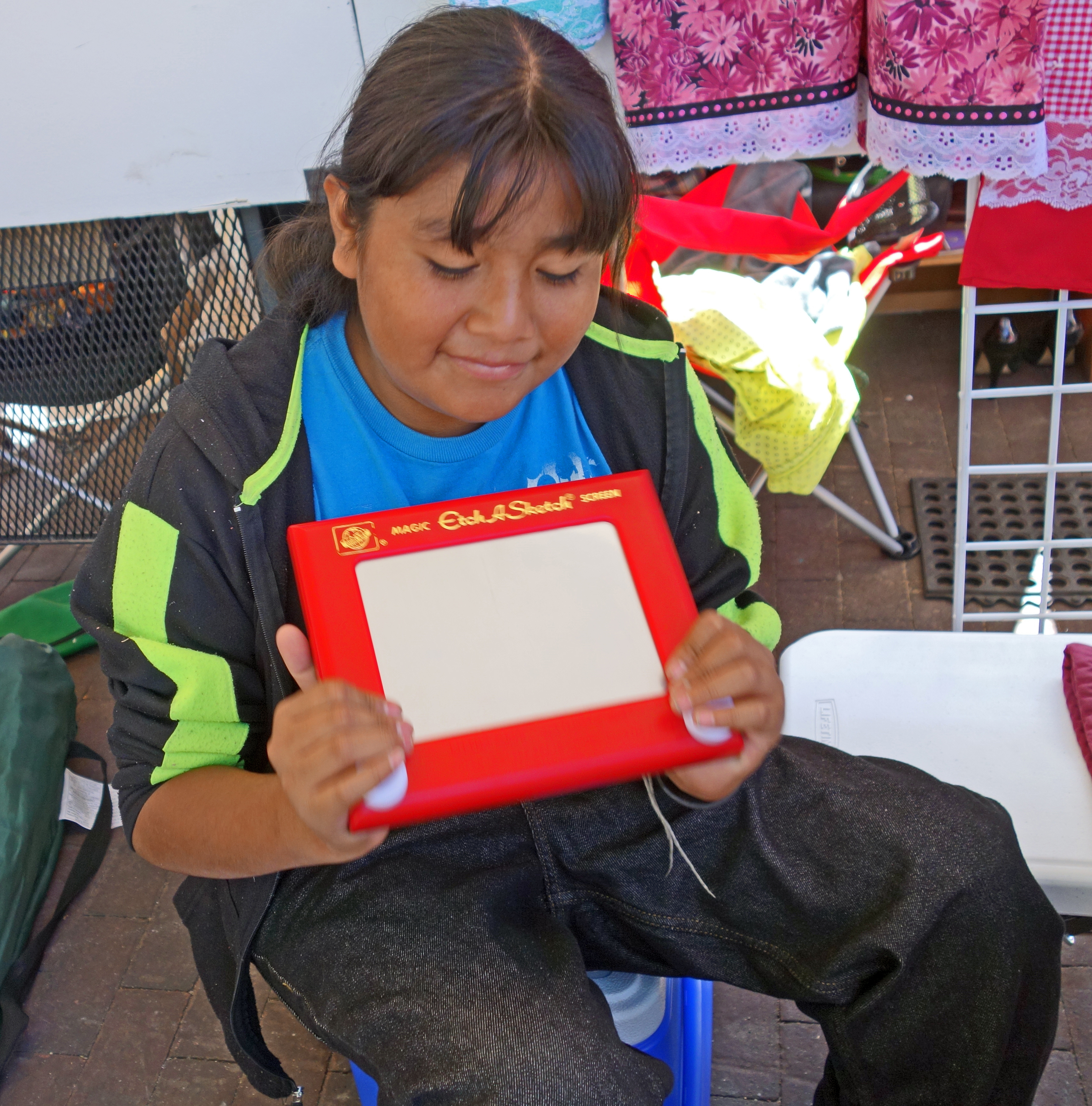
Girl shaking an Etch a Sketch to reset it

The toy is a kind of plotter. The inside surface of the glass screen is coated with aluminum powder, which is then scraped off by a movable stylus, leaving a dark line on the light gray screen. The stylus is controlled by the two large knobs, one of which moves it vertically and the other horizontally. Turning both knobs simultaneously makes diagonal lines. To erase the picture, the user turns the toy upside down and shakes it. Doing this causes polystyrene beads to smooth out and re-coat the inside surface of the screen with aluminum powder. The aluminum sticks to the screen due to electrostatic charges. The "black" line merely exposes the darkness inside the toy. Scraping out large "black" areas allows enough light through to expose parts of the interior.

== History ==
The Etch A Sketch toy was invented in the late 1950s by André Cassagnes, an electrician with Lincrusta Co, who named the toy L'Écran Magique lit. 'the magic screen'. In 1959, he took his drawing toy to the International Toy Fair in Nuremberg, Germany. The Ohio Art Company saw it but had no interest in the toy. When Ohio Art saw the toy a second time, they decided to take a chance on the product. L'Écran Magique was soon renamed Etch A Sketch and became the most popular drawing toy in the business. After a complex series of negotiations, the Ohio Art Company launched the toy in the United States in time for the 1960 Christmas season with the name "Etch A Sketch". Ohio Art supported the toy with a televised advertising campaign.

Originally, the toy used a plate glass screen, which was criticized by safety advocates for being easily broken and a danger to children. In November 1970, Consumers Union filed a petition with the Department of Health, Education and Welfare, asking for emergency action under the 1969 Child Protection and Toy Safety Act. The Food and Drug Administration responded that the toy had been redesigned, replacing the glass plate with plastic.

The Etch A Sketch toy was featured in the 1995 Disney/Pixar animated film Toy Story, in a scene where a sentient toy performs a "quick draw" duel with Sheriff Woody. This 12-second feature had been enough to give a significant sales boost, requiring the production line to work overtime to meet demand. By 1999, the company had again fallen into severe financial trouble from canceled orders of various products, reaching a point where the solvency of the company was in question. However, the company recovered with the prudent decision to agree to again have an Etch A Sketch appear in an animated feature film – this time in the 1999 sequel Toy Story 2. This scene featured an Etch A Sketch being used to present sketches related to the investigation of Sheriff Woody's kidnapping by Al McWhiggin, the toy collector and the owner of Al's Toy Barn. At 45 seconds, the scene is much longer than the scene in the original film. The exposure from the highly successful Pixar movie resulted in sales of the toy increasing by 20 percent and ensured survival of the company.

Etch A Sketch was manufactured in Bryan, Ohio, U.S. until the company moved the manufacturing plant to Shenzhen, China in 2001.

In France, its country of origin, Etch A Sketch was sold under the name of "Télécran", rather than L'Écran Magique.

In February 2016, the rights to the Etch A Sketch name and design were acquired by Toronto-based Spin Master Corporation.

=== Etch A Sketch Animator ===
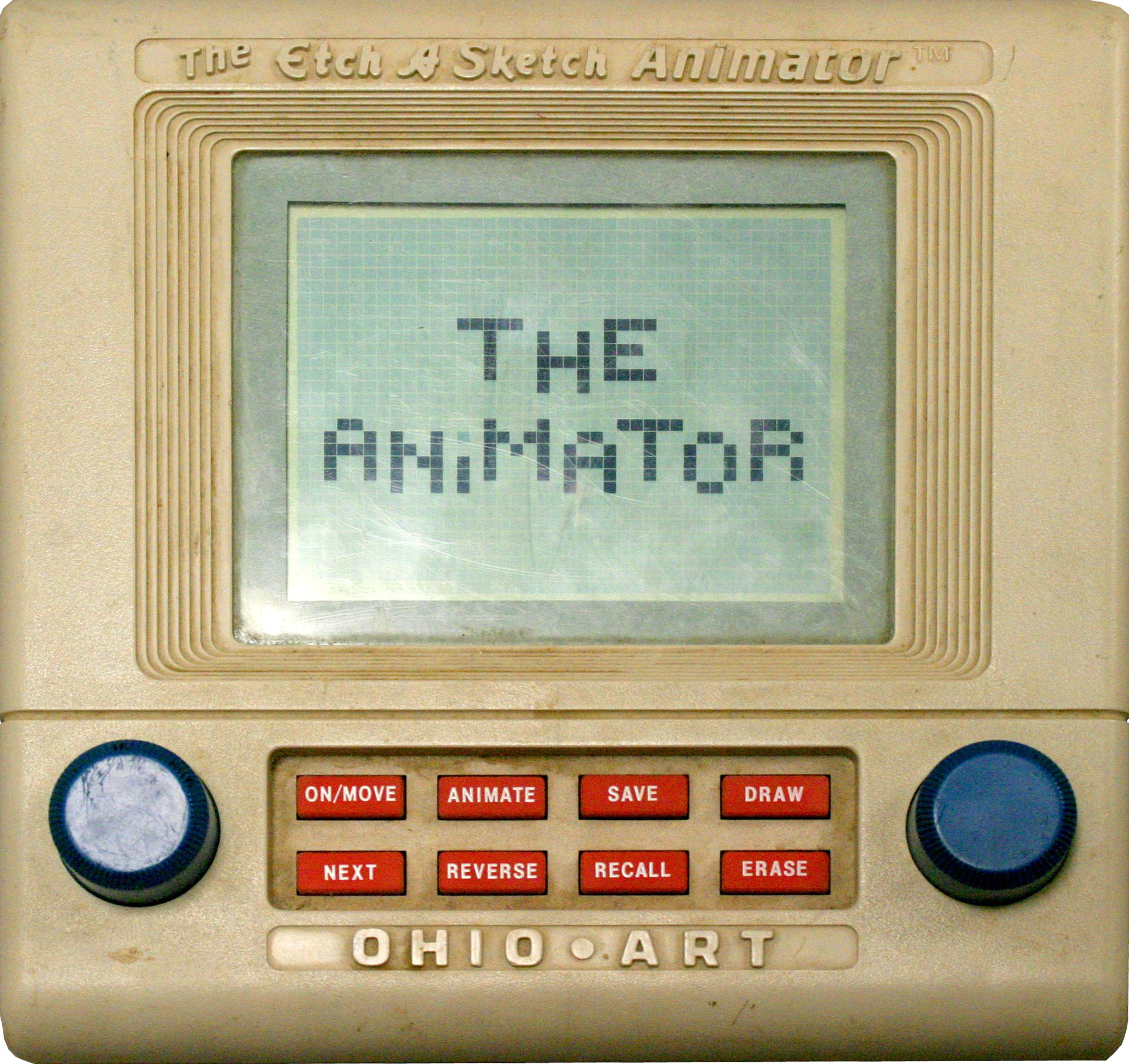
The Etch A Sketch Animator

The Etch A Sketch Animator (known as "The Animator" in Canada, and simply "the animator" in Europe), debuted in 1986, and featured a 40 × 30 dot matrix display and used two knobs for drawing, like a regular Etch A Sketch, with several buttons to manipulate the drawings. The initial price was US$89.99 (equivalent to $260 in 2025). It had two kilobytes of memory, capable of storing 12 frames of pictures in any combination up to 96 times. It contained a speaker, which made static-like sounds when the knobs were moved and during animations.

=== Etch A Sketch Animator 2000 ===
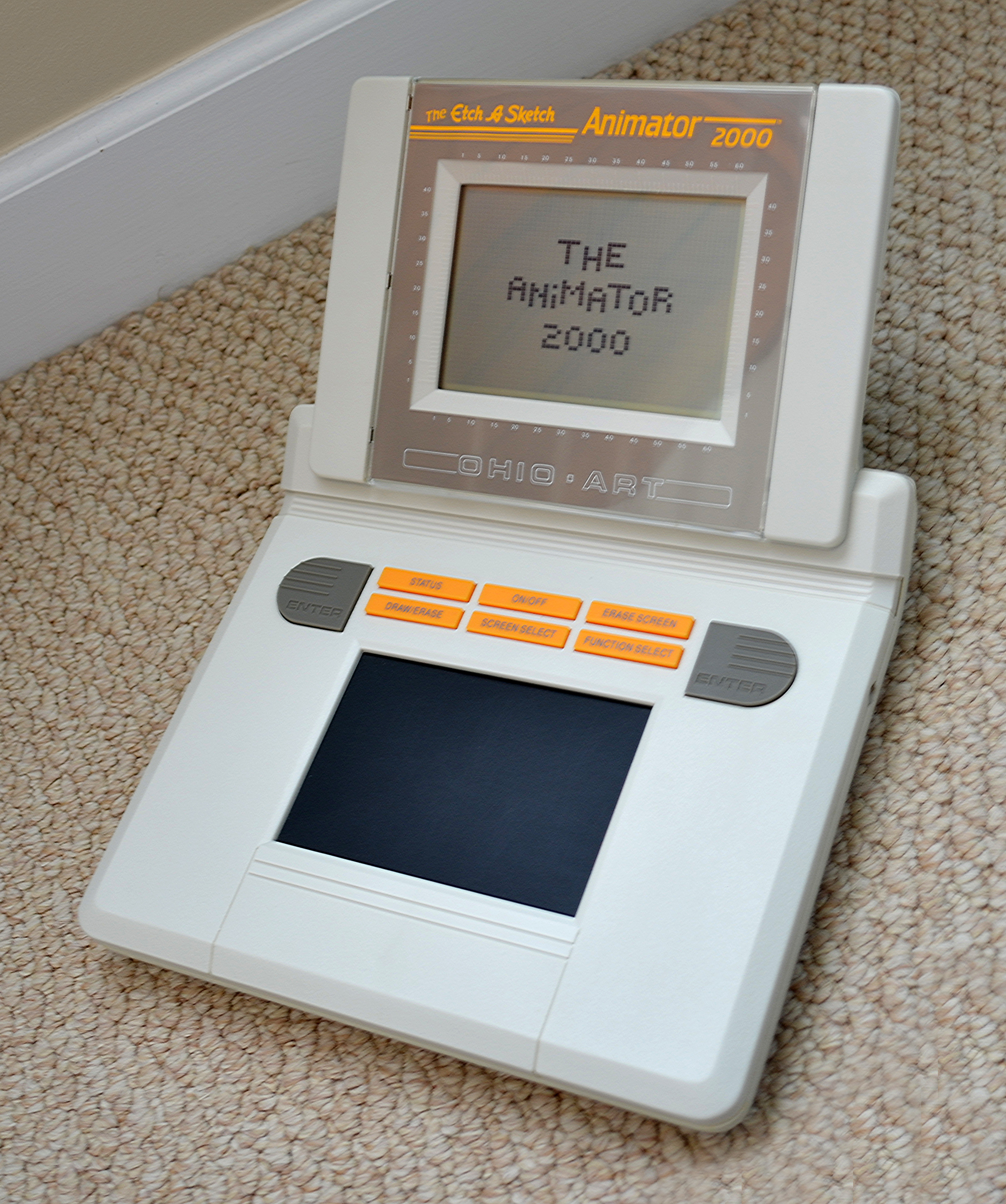
The Etch A Sketch Animator 2000

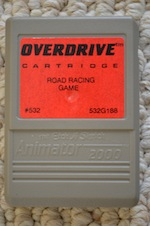
A cartridge for an Etch A Sketch Animator 2000

With the return of the home video game market in the mid-1980s and the relative success of the Etch A Sketch Animator, Ohio Art decided to release a high-tech sequel to the Animator, known as the Animator 2000. Ohio Art released the system in 1987, at a suggested retail price of US$139.99 (equivalent to $400 in 2025). The unit itself does not resemble a traditional Etch A Sketch: The classic knobs are replaced with "The Magic Touchpad", the system's form-factor resembles a laptop computer, and the unit features a large 60 × 40 LCD screen. The unit contains 196 KB of "powerful computer memory" which is a significant upgrade over the roughly 2 KB of the original Animator. This memory upgrade allowed the system to have 22 frames in which to store drawings, and these frames could be animated in sequence up to 99 times. This memory upgrade combined with the relatively powerful custom processor was also important since the Animator 2000 was designed to be a portable entertainment/games system instead of simply an electronic drawing toy. The unit features a cartridge slot, and four cartridges were available: "Fly By", a flight simulator game; "Overdrive", a road racing game; "Putt-Nuts", a miniature golf game; and "Memory", a memory expansion cartridge. The price for one cartridge was $28.99.

=== Etch A Sketch Color ===
Etch A Sketch Color

In 1993, Ohio launched a color Etch A Sketch. Similar to the original Etch A Sketch, it used the traditional two-knob interface to draw and featured six colored markers. These markers replaced the standard magnetic tip. These markers drew on an inserted piece of paper, creating a color picture.

Etch A Sketch ETO (Electronic TV Output)

=== Etch A Sketch ETO – Plug and Play Drawing System/Etch A Sketch Wired ===
These are basically hand-held controllers that connect to a television-like handheld TV games and work like a regular Etch A Sketch, except on the television screen and with the addition of colors and sound effects.

== Etch A Sketch art ==
There are a few practicing artists who use the Etch A Sketch to produce professional lineographic work. The artists make their work permanent by removing the aluminum powder. This is done either by drilling holes in the bottom of the toy or by disassembling it. It is then resealed as a permanent, shake-resistant piece of art.

== See also ==
- Magna Doodle, a somewhat similar toy using a different principle of operation.
- Etch A Sketch gaffe during the 2012 Mitt Romney presidential campaign.
