= US-1 Trucks =

Slot car toy line

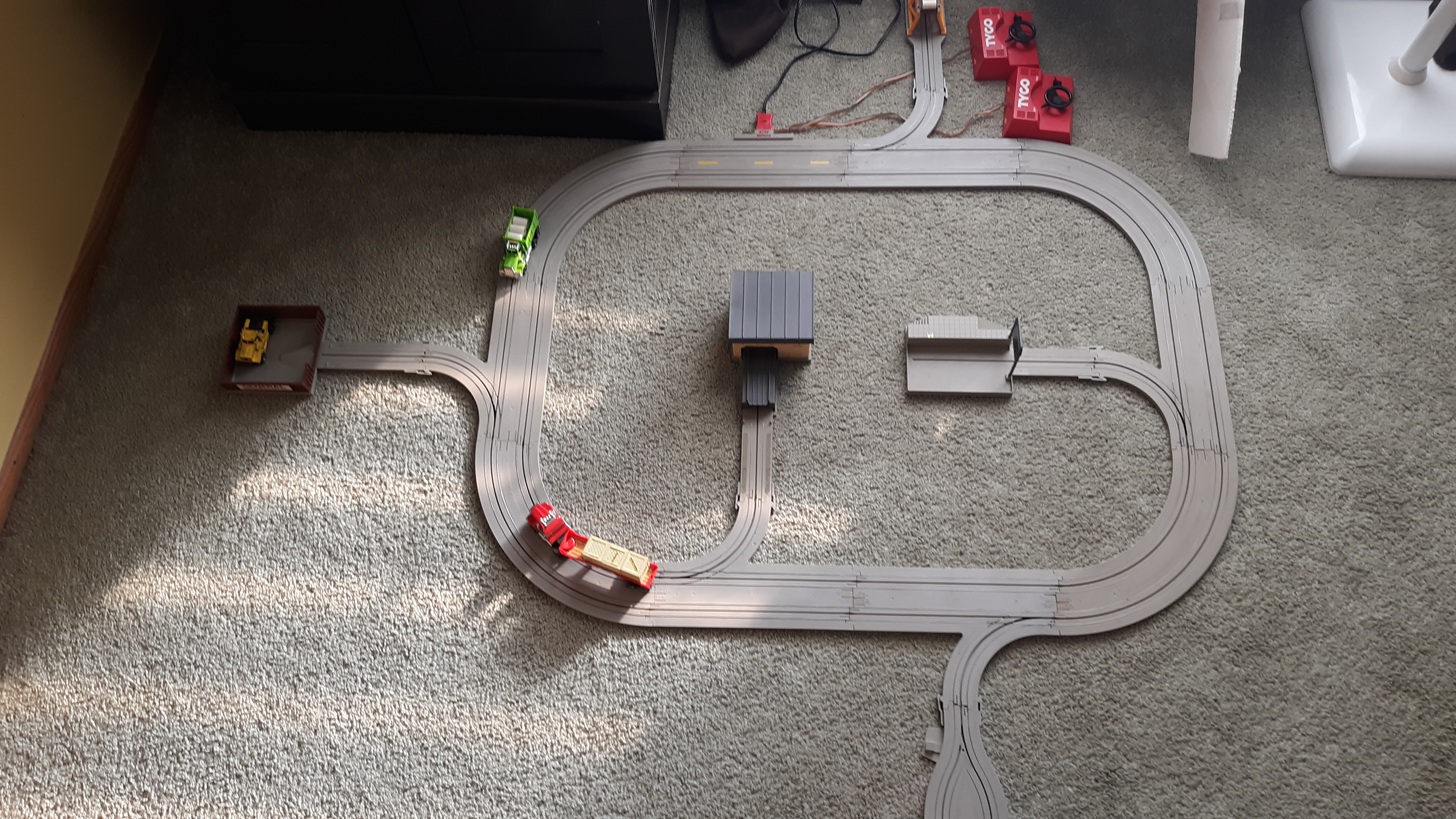
US-1 slot car toys on a track

US-1 is a defunct line of slot car toys that was made and distributed by Tyco Toys during the 1980s. The toy line features toy freight trucks and tracks. A tie-in comic book series titled U.S. 1 was published by Marvel Comics from 1983 to 1984.
