= Line art =

2-dimensional art style without gradations in shade or hue

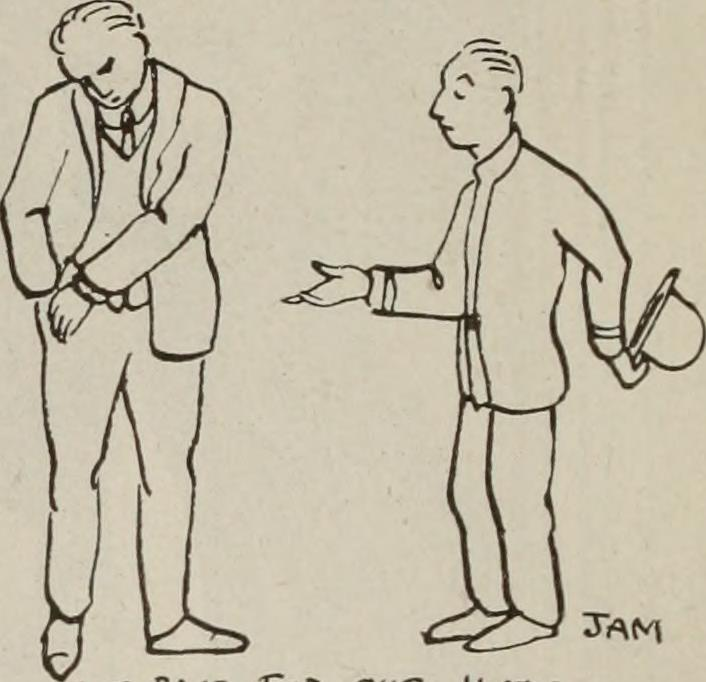
Example of line art (published in The Survey, October 1917–March 1918).

Line art or line drawing is any image that consists of distinct straight lines or curved lines placed against a background (usually plain). Two-dimensional or three-dimensional objects are often represented through shade (darkness) or hue (color). Line art can use lines of different colors, although line art is usually monochromatic.

Several techniques used in printmaking largely or entirely use lines, such as engraving, etching and woodcut, and drawings with pen or pencil may be made up of lines.

== Techniques ==
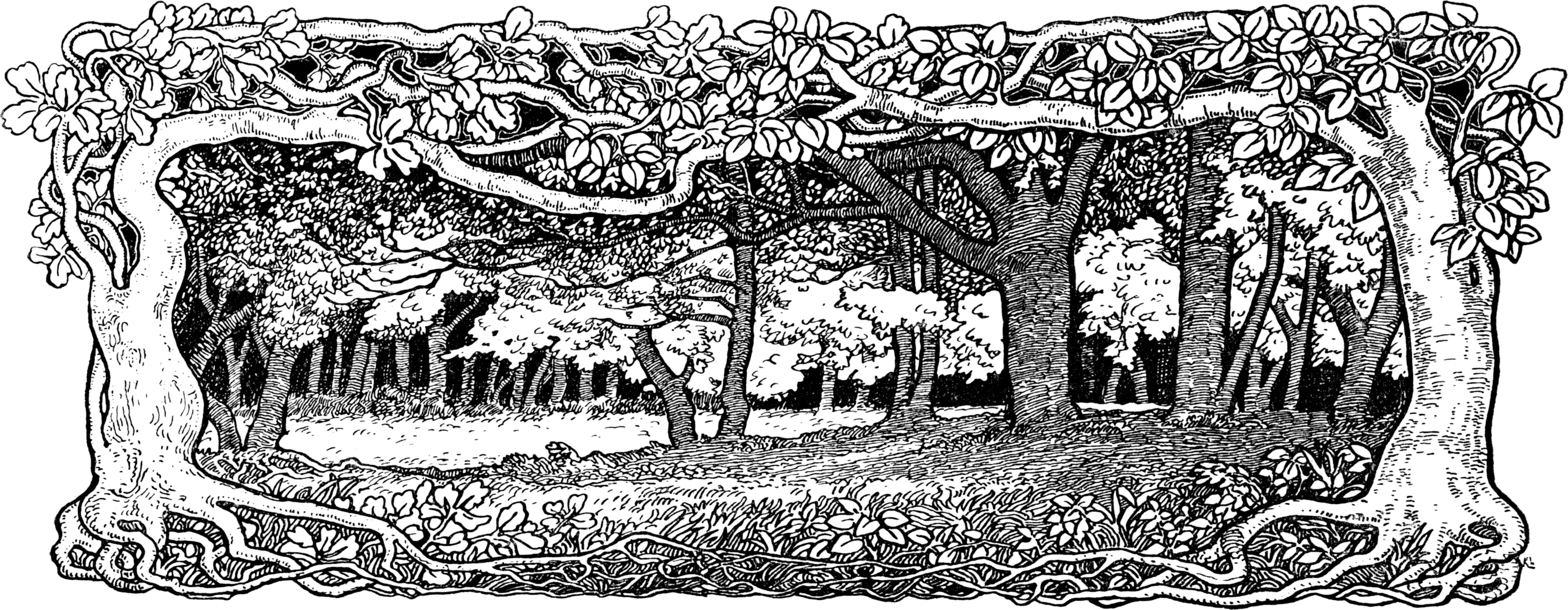
Art Nouveau line art

Line art emphasizes form and drawings, of several (few) constant widths (as in technical illustrations), or of freely varying widths (as in brush work or engraving). Line art may tend towards realism (as in much of Gustave Doré's work), or it may be a caricature, cartoon, ideograph, or glyph.

== Form ==
One of the most fundamental elements of art is the line. An important feature of a line is that it indicates the edge of a two-dimensional (flat) shape or a three-dimensional form. A shape can be indicated by means of an outline, and a three-dimensional form can be indicated by contour lines.

== History ==
Before the development of photography and of halftones, line art was the standard format for illustrations to be used in print publications, using black ink on white paper. Using either stippling or hatching, shades of gray could also be simulated.

== Image gallery ==
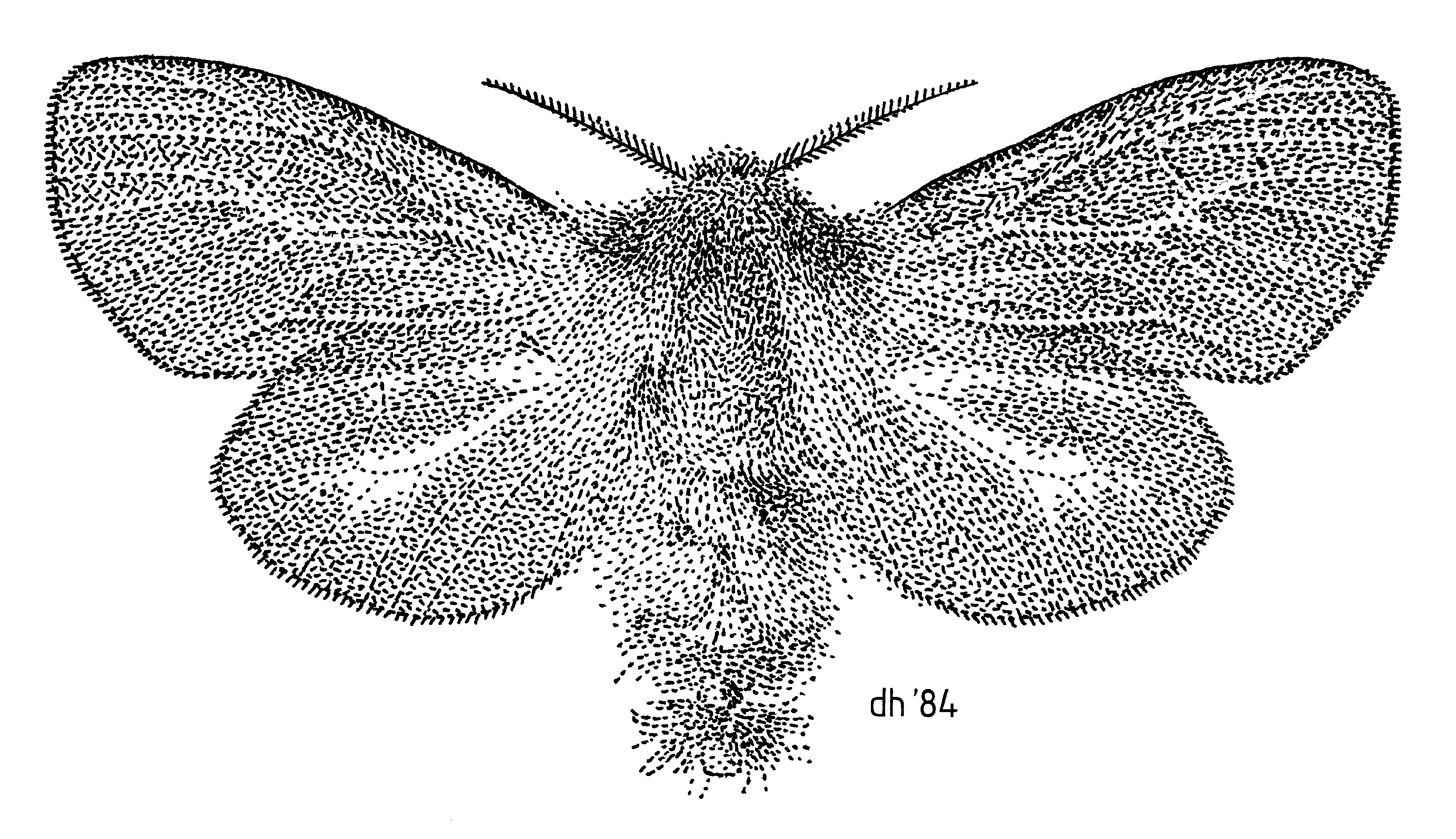
Stippling

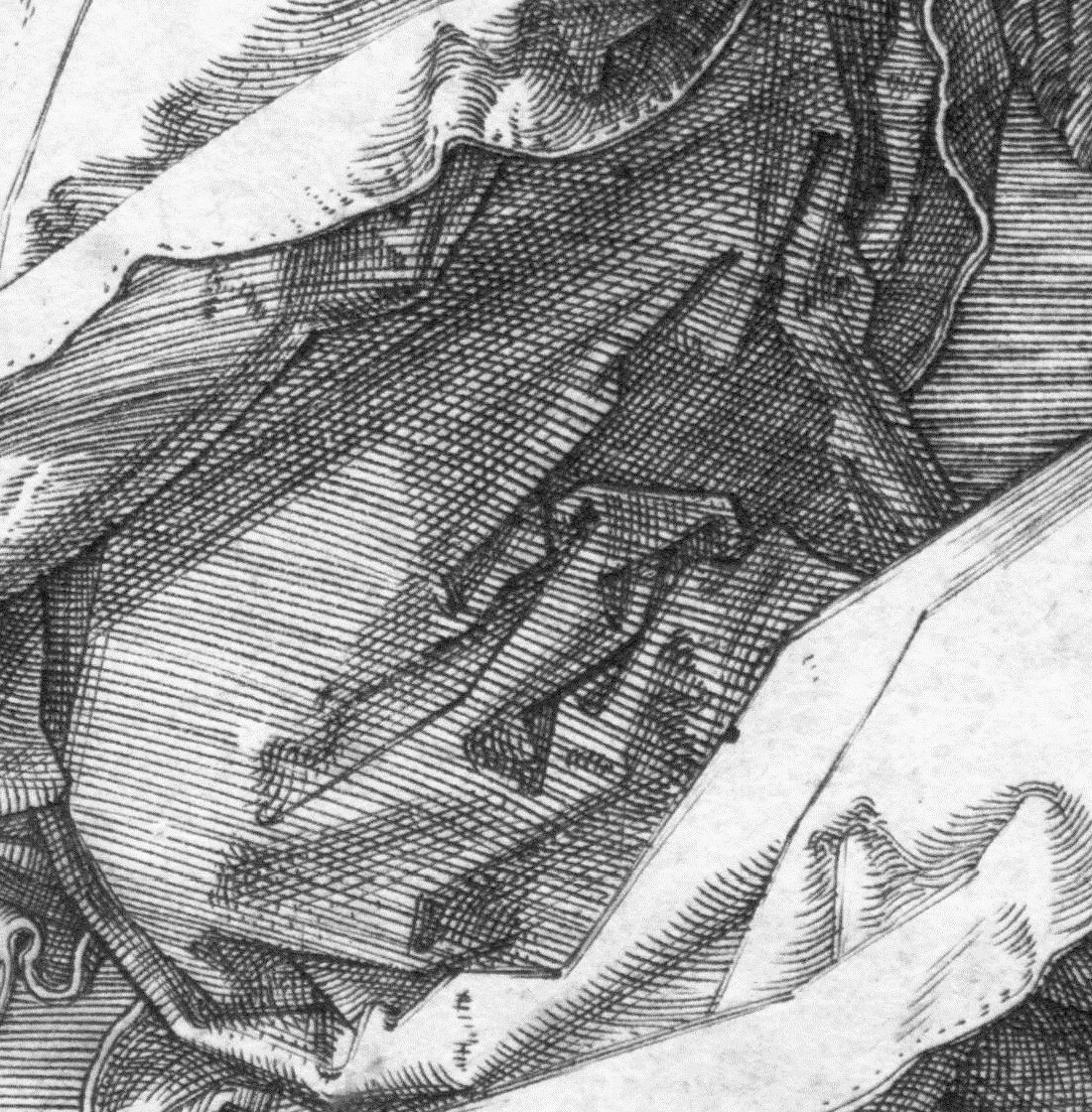
Detail of hatching

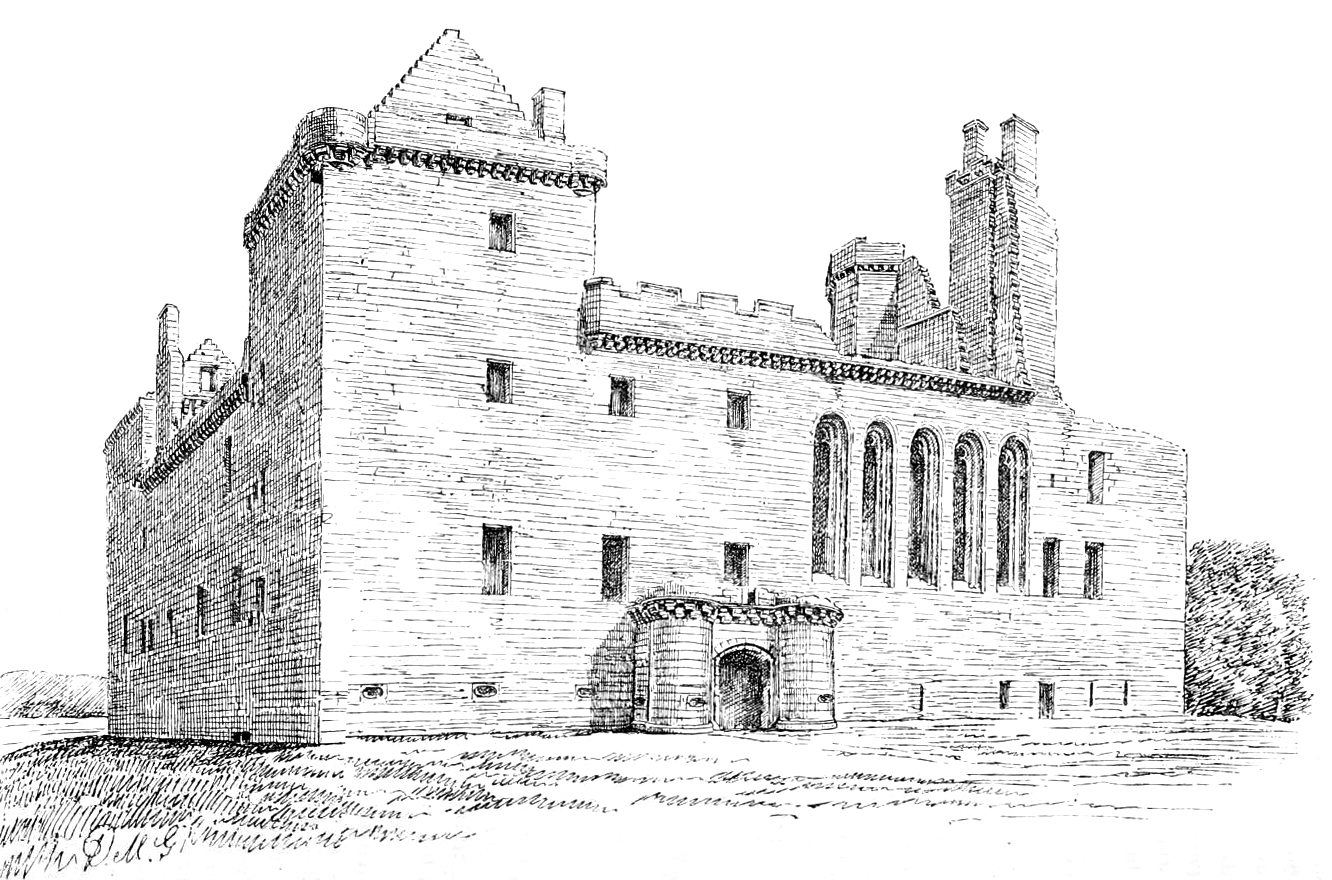
Linlithgow Palace

Line art peacock

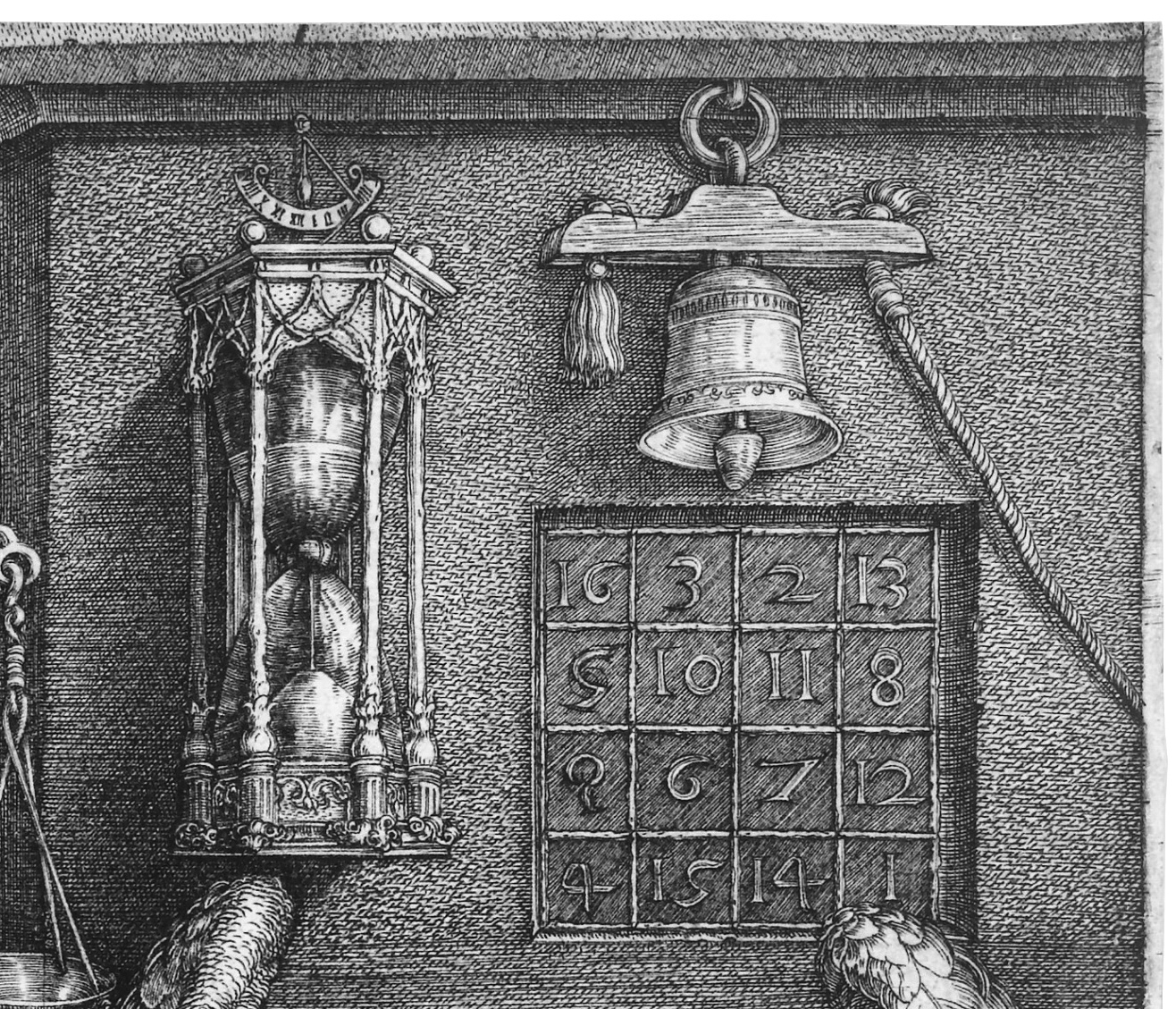
Detail of Melencolia I by Albrecht Dürer

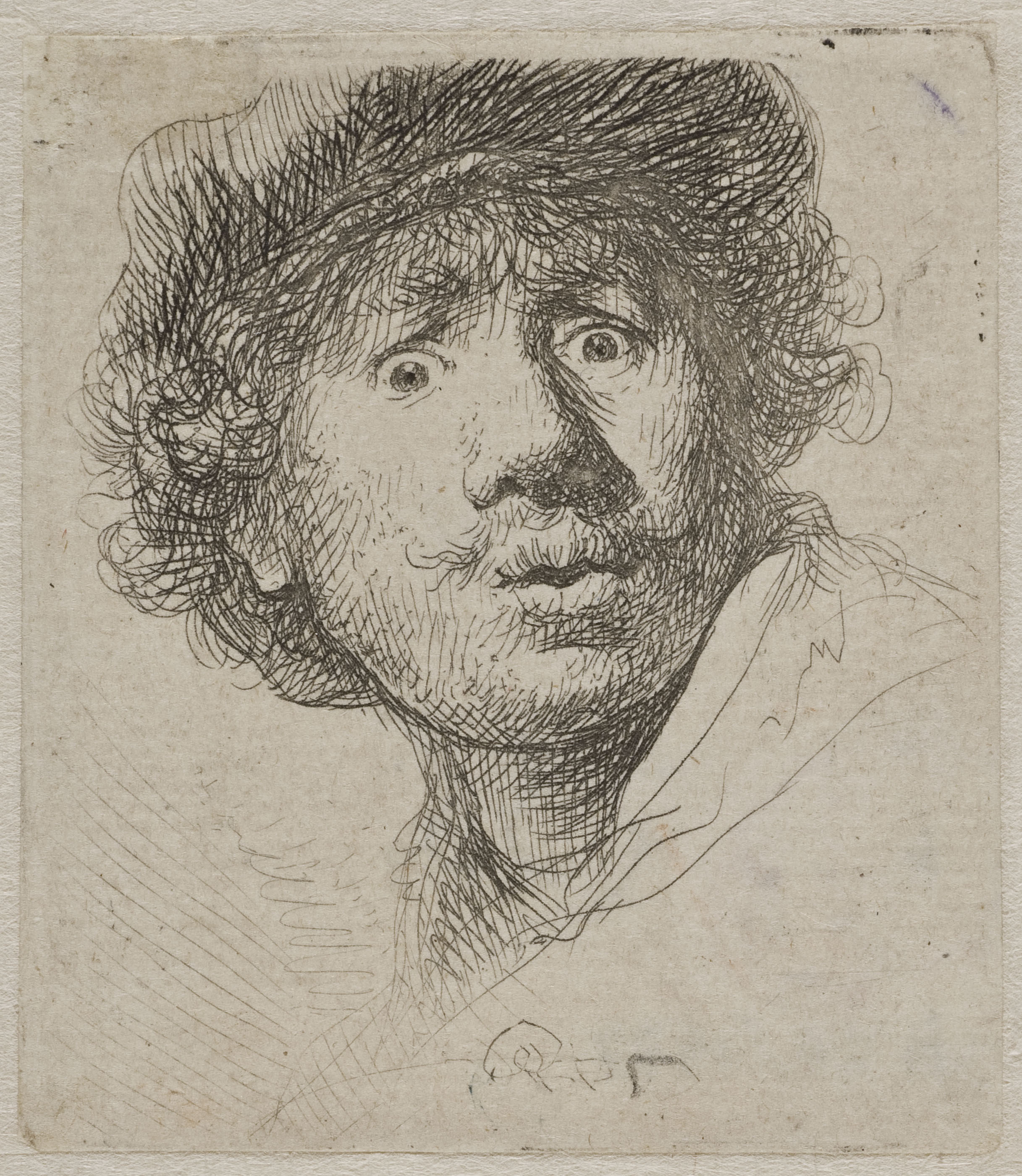
Self-portrait by Rembrandt

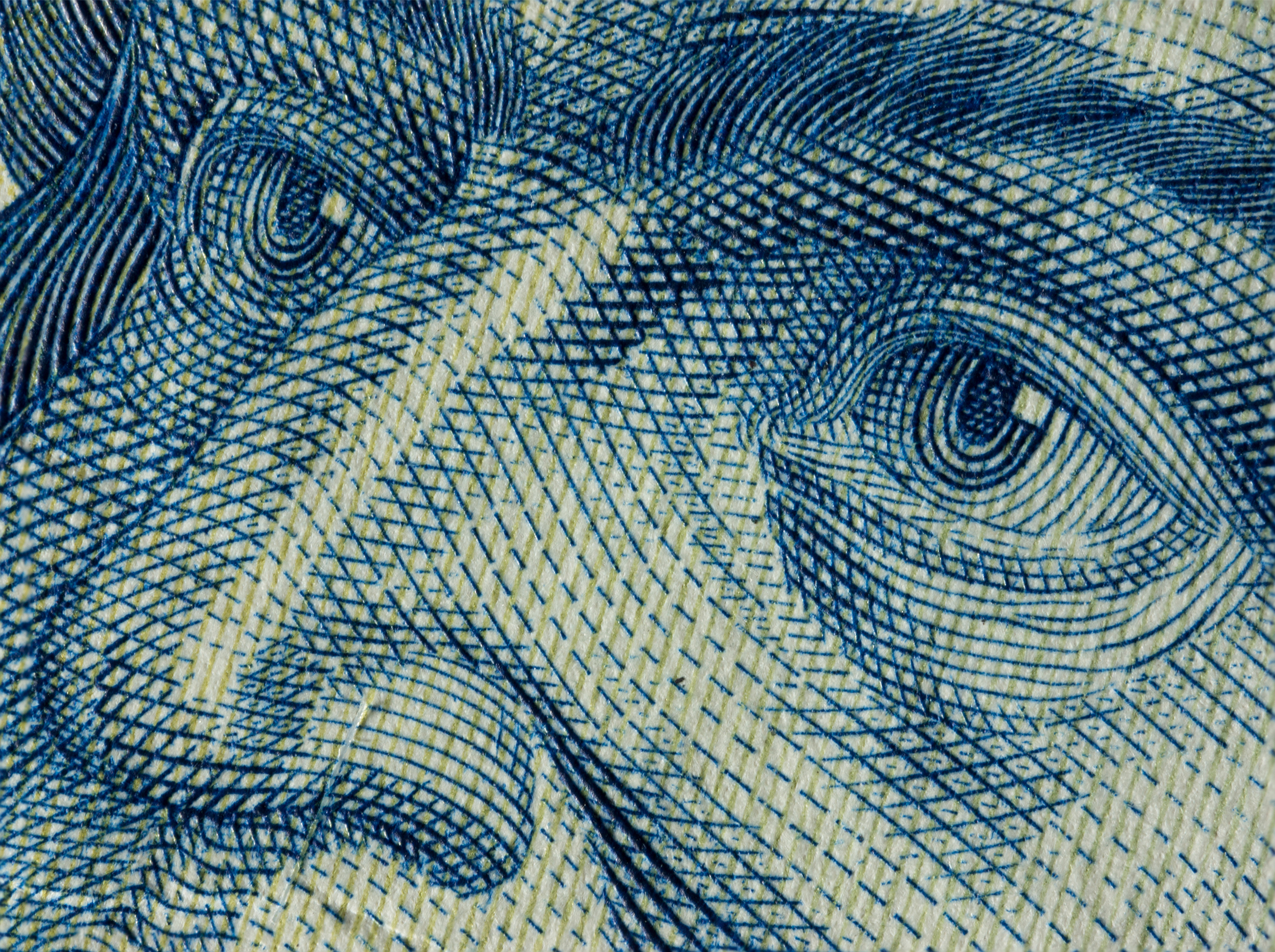
Bank note detail

== See also ==
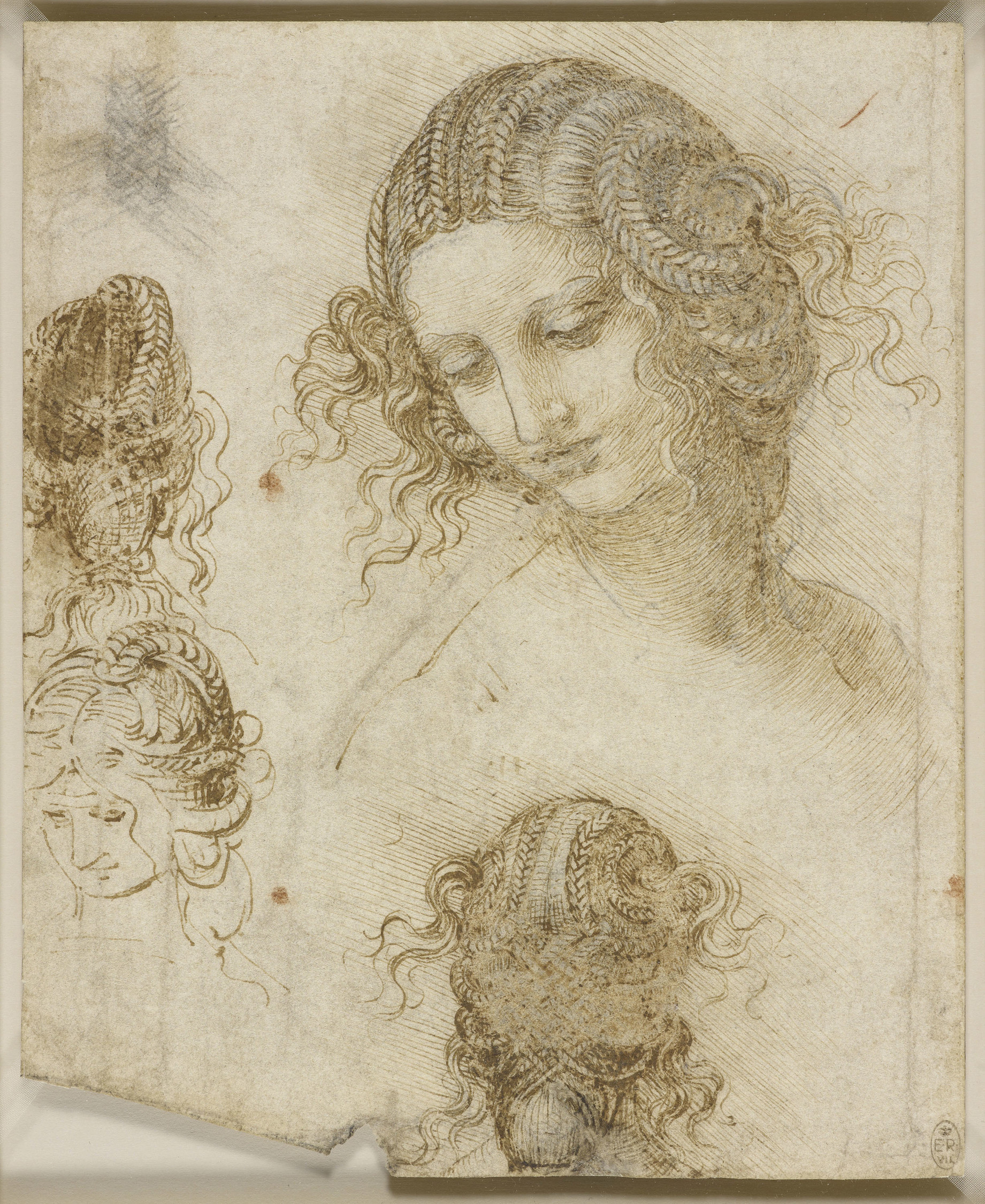
Line art by Leonardo da Vinci

- Lineography
- Old master print
- Screentone
- Hatching
- Stippling
- Halftone
- Ben-Day dots
