= Dauphin of France =

Title given to the heir apparent to the throne of France

Arms of the Dauphin of France. It is surrounded by the chains of the Order of the Holy Spirit and Order of Saint Michael, and behind is a mantle with fleurs-de-lys. Atop the arms is the unique coronet of the Dauphin, with arches in the form of dolphins.

Dauphin of France (/ˈdɔːfɪn/, also UK: /dɔːˈfɪn, ˈdoʊfæ̃/ US: /ˈdoʊfɪn, doʊˈfæ̃/; French: Dauphin de France [dofɛ̃ də fʁɑ̃s]), originally Dauphin of Viennois (Dauphin de Viennois), was the title given to the heir apparent to the throne of France from 1350 to 1791, and from 1824 to 1830. The word dauphin is French for dolphin and was originally the hereditary title of the ruler of the Dauphiné of Viennois. While early heirs were granted these lands to rule, eventually only the title was granted.

== History ==
Count Guigues IV of Albon (d. 1142) in Viennois, within the Kingdom of Burgundy (Arles), under the suzerainty of the Holy Roman Empire, had a dolphin on his coat of arms, and was nicknamed le Dauphin. In time, that nickname came to be used as a title. Since c. 1285, the title of Dauphin de Viennois was already in official use by the counts of Albon, and their domains came to be known as the Dauphiné.

In 1343, a series of negotiations was initiated between dauphin Humbert II of Viennois and the French king Philippe VI, regarding the future inheritance of the Dauphiné. Since Humbert had no heirs, it was initially agreed that in exchange for a substantial financial compensation, his domains would pass to king's younger son Philip, Duke of Orléans, but already in 1344 the provisions were changed by the new agreement, designating king's oldest son and heir Jean, Duke of Normandy as Humbert's heir in the Dauphiné.

By 1349, Humbert decided to relinquish his rule over Dauphiné, and the final agreement was made, designating king's grandson and John's son Charles as Humbert's successor, on the condition that Dauphiné would remain a distinctive polity, not integrated into the French realm. Thus in the summer of 1349, the young French prince Charles became the first Dauphin de Viennois from the House of Valois. In 1350, when his father ascended to the French throne as king John II, Charles became the heir presumptive and thus for the first time both honors (heir to the French throne and Dauphin de Viennois) were held by the same person.

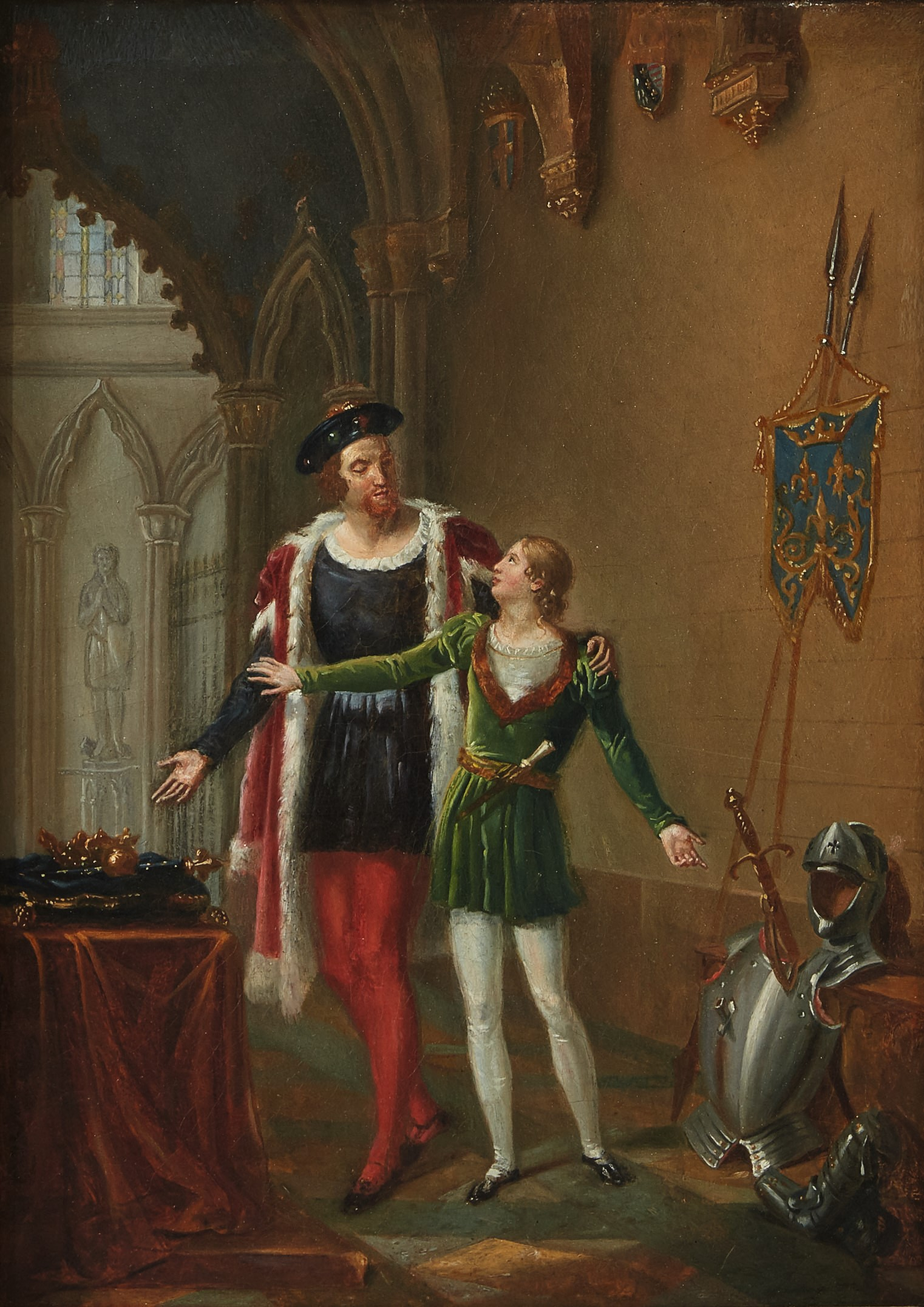
Charles V and his son, the Dauphin Charles de France (later Charles VI). Painted by Claude-Jean Besselièvre c. 1820.

Originally the Dauphin was personally responsible for the rule of the Dauphiné, which was legally part of the Holy Roman Empire, and which the emperors, in giving the rule of the province to the French heirs, had stipulated must never be united with France. Because of this, the Dauphiné suffered from anarchy in the 14th and 15th centuries, since the Dauphins were frequently minors or concerned with other matters.

During his period as Dauphin, Louis, son of Charles VII, defied his father by remaining in the province longer than the king permitted and by engaging in personal politics more beneficial to the Dauphiné than to France. For example, he married Charlotte of Savoy against his father's wishes. Savoy was a traditional ally of the Dauphiné, and Louis wished to reaffirm that alliance to stamp out rebels and robbers in the province. Louis was driven out of the Dauphiné by Charles VII's soldiers in 1456, leaving the region to fall back into disorder. After his succession as Louis XI in 1461, Louis united the Dauphiné with France, bringing it under royal control.

The title was roughly equivalent to the Spanish Prince of Asturias, the Portuguese Prince of Brazil, the English (later British) Prince of Wales, the Dutch Prince of Orange, and the Scottish Duke of Rothesay. The official style of a Dauphin of France, prior to 1461, was par la grâce de Dieu, dauphin de Viennois, comte de Valentinois et de Diois ("By the Grace of God, Dauphin of Viennois, Count of Valentinois and of Diois"). A Dauphin of France united the coat of arms of the Dauphiné, which featured dolphins, with the French fleurs-de-lis, and might, where appropriate, further unite that with other arms (e.g. Francis, son of Francis I, was ruling Duke of Brittany, so united the arms of that province with the typical arms of a Dauphin; Francis II, while Dauphin, was also King of Scots by marriage to Mary I, and added the arms of the Kingdom of Scotland to those of the Dauphin).

The title was automatically conferred upon the next heir apparent to the throne in the direct line upon birth, accession of the parent to the throne or death of the previous Dauphin, unlike the British title Prince of Wales, which has always been in the gift of the monarch (traditionally conferred upon the heir's 21st birthday).

The sons of the King of France held the style and rank of fils de France (son of France), while male-line grandsons were given the style and rank of petits-enfants de France (Grandson of France). The sons and grandsons of the Dauphin ranked higher than their cousins, being treated as the king's children and grandchildren respectively. The sons of the Dauphin, though grandsons of the king, were ranked as Sons of France, and the grandsons of the Dauphin ranked as Grandsons of France; other great-grandsons of the king ranked merely as princes of the blood.

The title was abolished by the Constitution of 1791, which made France a constitutional monarchy. Under the constitution the heir-apparent to the throne (Dauphin Louis-Charles at that time) was restyled Prince Royal (a Prince of the Blood retitled prince français), taking effect from the inception of the Legislative Assembly on 1 October 1791. The title was restored in potentia under the Bourbon Restoration of Louis XVIII, but there would not be another Dauphin until after his death. With the accession of his brother Charles X, Charles' son and heir Louis-Antoine, Duke of Angoulême automatically became Dauphin.

With the removal of the Bourbons the title fell into disuse, Louis Philippe I's heirs (Ferdinand Philippe and Philippe of Paris) being titled Prince Royal. After the death of Henri, Count of Chambord, Prince Carlos, Duke of Madrid, the heir of the legitimist claimant, Prince Juan, Count of Montizón, made use of the title in pretense, as have the Spanish legitimist claimants since.

== Gallery of Arms ==
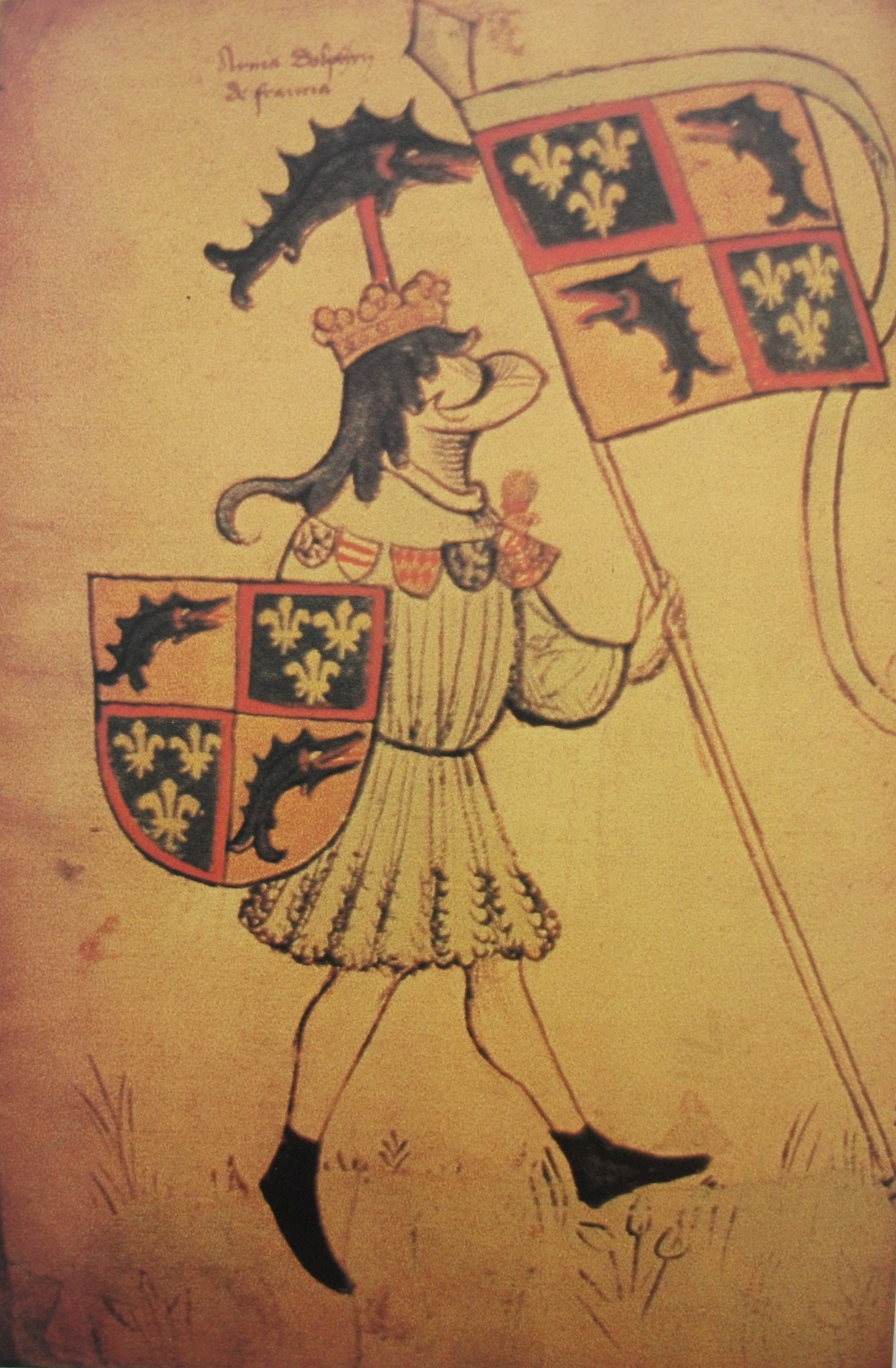
Illustration of the Dauphin Louis de France (later King Louis XI) in a manuscript c. 1450, displaying the arms of the Dauphin.

Arms of the Dauphin of France, depicting the fleur-de-lis and the dolphin.

Arms of the Dauphiné

Arms of Dauphin François, Duke of Brittany.

Arms of Dauphin Francis, King-consort of Scots.

Heraldic Crown of the Dauphin of France.

== List of Dauphins ==
N°	Name as Dauphin	Heir of	Birth	Became Dauphin	Ceased to be Dauphin	Death	Other titles before or while Dauphin	Name as King	Dauphine
1	Charles	John II	21 January 1338	Summer 1349; Became Dauphin de Viennois 22 August 1350; Became the heir presumptive	8 April 1364 Became King	16 September 1380	Duke of Normandy	Charles V	Joanna of Bourbon
2	Charles	Charles V	3 December 1368		16 September 1380 Became King	21 October 1422	—	Charles VI	–
3	Charles	Charles VI	26 September 1386		28 December 1386		—	–	–
4	Charles	Charles VI	6 February 1392		13 January 1401		Duke of Guyenne	–	–
5	Louis	Charles VI	22 January 1397	13 January 1401	18 December 1415		Duke of Guyenne	–	Margaret of Burgundy
6	Jean	Charles VI	31 August 1398	18 December 1415	5 April 1417		Duke of Touraine	–	Jacqueline of Hainaut
7	Charles	Charles VI	22 February 1403	5 April 1417	21 October 1422 Became King	22 July 1461	Count of Ponthieu	Charles VII	–
8	Louis	Charles VII	3 July 1423		22 July 1461 Became King	30 August 1483	—	Louis XI	Margaret of Scotland; Charlotte of Savoy
9	François	Louis XI	4 December 1466				—	–	–
10	Charles	Louis XI	30 June 1470		30 August 1483 Became King	7 April 1498	—	Charles VIII	–
11	Charles Orland	Charles VIII	11 October 1492		16 December 1495		—	–	–
12	Charles	Charles VIII	8 September 1496		2 October 1496		—	–	–
13	François	Charles VIII	July 1497				—	–	–
14	François	Francis I	28 February 1518		10 August 1536		Duke of Brittany	–	–
15	Henri	Francis I	31 March 1519	10 August 1536	31 March 1547 Became King	10 July 1559	Duke of Orléans, Duke of Brittany	Henry II	Catherine de' Medici
16	François	Henry II	19 January 1544	31 March 1547	10 July 1559 Became King	5 December 1560	King-consort of Scotland	Francis II	Mary, Queen of Scots
17	Louis	Henry IV	27 September 1601		14 May 1610 Became King	14 May 1643	—	Louis XIII	–
18	Louis-Dieudonné	Louis XIII	5 September 1638		14 May 1643 Became King	1 September 1715	—	Louis XIV	–
19	Louis, le Grand Dauphin	Louis XIV	1 November 1661		14 April 1711		—	–	Duchess Maria Anna Victoria of Bavaria
20	Louis, le Petit Dauphin	Louis XIV	16 August 1682	14 April 1711	18 February 1712		Duke of Burgundy	–	Marie Adélaïde of Savoy
21	Louis	Louis XIV	8 January 1707	18 February 1712	8 March 1712		Duke of Brittany	–	–
22	Louis	Louis XIV	15 February 1710	8 March 1712	1 September 1715 Became King	10 May 1774	Duke of Anjou	Louis XV	–
23	Louis-Ferdinand	Louis XV	4 September 1729		20 December 1765		—	–	Infanta Maria Teresa Rafaela of Spain; Duchess Maria Josepha of Saxony
24	Louis-Auguste	Louis XV	23 August 1754	20 December 1765	10 May 1774 Became King	21 January 1793	Duke of Berry	Louis XVI	Archduchess Maria Antonia of Austria
25	Louis-Joseph	Louis XVI	22 October 1781		4 June 1789		—	–	–
26	Louis-Charles	Louis XVI	27 March 1785	4 June 1789	1 October 1791 Retitled as "Prince-royal"	8 June 1795	Duke of Normandy	Louis XVII	–
27	Louis-Antoine	Charles X	6 August 1775	16 September 1824	2 August 1830 Abdication	3 June 1844	Duke of Angoulême	Louis XIX	Marie Thérèse of France

== In literature ==
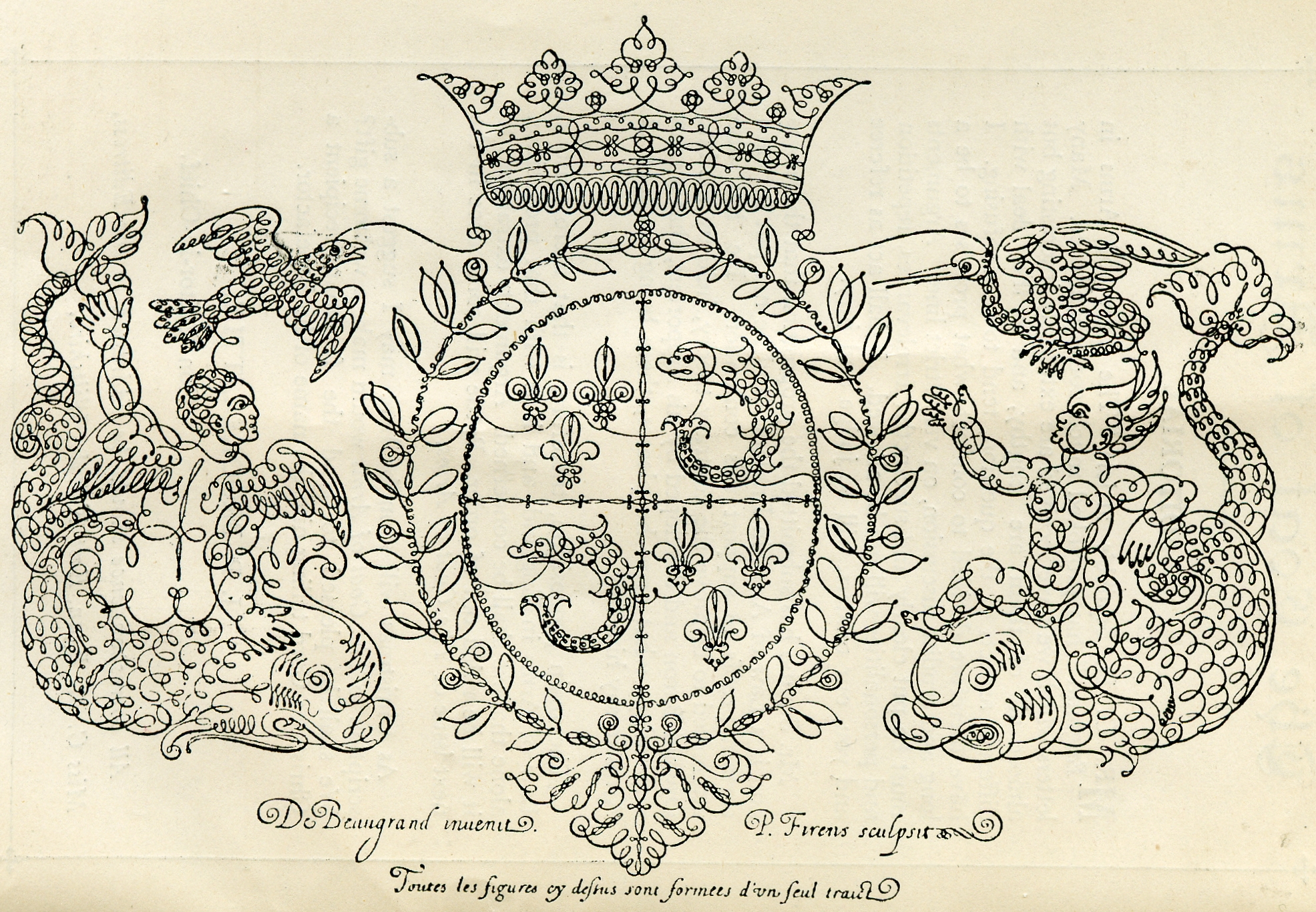
A lineographic representation of the arms of the Dauphin. Designed by Jean de Beaugrand in 1604.

In Mark Twain's Adventures of Huckleberry Finn, Huck encounters two odd characters who turn out to be professional con men. One of them claims that he should be treated with deference, since he is "really" an impoverished English duke, and the other, not to be outdone, reveals that he is "really" the Dauphin "Looy the Seventeen, son of Looy the Sixteen and Marry Antonet".

Louis, Duke of Guyenne, the Dauphin of Viennois, is a character in William Shakespeare's Henry V. Another Shakespeare play, King John, features the future Louis VIII as "Lewis the Dauphin" - this is an anachronism, as he died over a century before the term was applied to French heirs-apparent.

In Baroness Emma Orczy's Eldorado, the Scarlet Pimpernel rescues the Dauphin from prison and helps spirit him from France.

Alphonse Daudet wrote a short story called "The Death of the Dauphin", about a young Dauphin who wants to stop Death from approaching him.

The Dauphin is also mentioned in Cormac McCarthy's Blood Meridian.

"The Dauphin" is a 1988 episode of Star Trek: The Next Generation. As the titular character (a planetary princess) is female, the episode title gets the gender incorrect (the French female equivalent is "Dauphine").

Robert Pattinson portrays the Dauphin of Viennois in The King.

== See also ==
- Dauphine of France
- Fundamental laws of the Kingdom of France
- List of heirs to the French throne
- Prince of Asturias
- Prince of Beira
- Duke of Braganza
- Crown prince
- Tsarevich
- Dauphins of Viennois
- Dauphins of Auvergne
- King of Rome
- Madame Royale
- Mediterranean cetaceans
- Monsieur
- Madame
- Fils de France
- Petit-Fils de France
- Prince du Sang
- Prince of Tarnovo
- Prince of Wales

== Sources ==
- Guiffrey, Jules (1868). Histoire de la réunion du Dauphiné à la France. Paris: Académie des bibliophiles.
- Kibler, William W.; Zinn, Grover A., eds. (2011) [1995]. Medieval France: An Encyclopedia. New York and London: Routledge.
