= Bob Harras =

American comics writer and editor (born 1959)

- Born: Robert Harras; January 11, 1959 (age 67)
- Areas: Writer, Editor
- Notable works: X-Men titles The Avengers; Nick Fury vs. S.H.I.E.L.D.

Robert Harras (born January 11, 1959) is an American comics writer and editor, who was editor-in-chief of Marvel Comics from 1995 to 2000 and editor-in-chief of DC Comics from 2010 to 2020.

== Career ==
Harras started his career at Marvel as assistant editor for Ralph Macchio, where he worked on such titles as The Saga of Crystar, Dazzler, ROM, U.S. 1, and Micronauts. Later, Harras was chief editor of Marvel's X-Men and Midnight Sons lines. Harras also worked as writer on a number of comics, including a run on The Avengers lasting from 1992 to 1995, and the best-selling 1988 limited series Nick Fury vs. S.H.I.E.L.D. His brief run on Namor, the Sub-Mariner in 1992–93 was unique for the time, taking the form of a mostly standalone Tolkienesque epic.

Harras's tenure as editor-in-chief occurred during the time which Marvel teetered on bankruptcy around 1996 and 1997 (financial trouble became significantly worse during his time at Marvel). During his tenure, Harras oversaw titles such as Captain America, Daredevil, Ka-Zar and Deadpool. Following the Heroes Reborn experiment, where oversight of four titles was outsourced to Jim Lee and Rob Liefeld, one of the more successful relaunches during Harras' tenure was of those titles under the "Heroes Return" banner, including The Avengers by Kurt Busiek and George Perez.

However, the Spider-Man "Clone Saga", in which Norman Osborn was brought back as the Green Goblin despite the opposition of many of the writers, received enough negative reception that it overshadowed his critical successes.

After leaving Marvel, Harras joined WildStorm as contributing editor on November 15, 2001. Harras worked from his New Jersey home office, and reported to Jim Lee, WildStorm's editorial director. Until late September 2010, he was the group editor for DC Comics collected editions and editor of DC's new Who's Who series.

On September 27, 2010, DC Comics named Bob Harras as the company's new editor-in-chief and Vice President. Harras oversaw editorial for all DC Comics, DC Universe, MAD Magazine and Vertigo publications. He became DC's first Editor-in-Chief after Jenette Kahn, who had held the position from 1989 to 2002. He was laid off from DC on August 10, 2020.

== Bibliography ==
=== Marvel Comics ===
- The Avengers #280, #334-339, #343-351, #355-369, #372-375, #378-382, #384-395 (1987-1996)
- Avengers: The Crossing #1 (1995); one-shot
- Avengers: Strikefile #1 (1994); one-shot
- Avengers: Timeslide #1 (1996); one-shot, co-written with Terry Kavanagh
- Defenders of the Earth #1 (1987); co-written with Stan Lee
- Fantastic Four Annual #23 (1990); co-written with Walt Simonson
- The Incredible Hulk #360 (1989)
- Iron Man #178, Annual #7-8 (1984-1986)
- Marvel Comics Presents #17-24 (1989)
- Namor, the Sub-Mariner #33-40 (1992-1993)
- Nick Fury vs. S.H.I.E.L.D. #1-6 (1988)
- Nick Fury, Agent of S.H.I.E.L.D. (vol. 3) #1-6, #12-14 (1989-1990)
- RoboCop #1 (1987); film adaptation one-shot issue
- Rom: Spaceknight #50 (1984); second story
- The Thing #18 (1984)
- The Mighty Thor #356 (1985)
- Vision #1-4 (1994-1995)

=== DC Comics ===
- Breach #1-11 (2005-2006)
- JLA #120-125 (2005-2006)

== Sources ==
- "Bob Harras: An Oral History in Collage" – WWAC

Preceded by Larry Hama	The Avengers writer 1991–1996 (with Terry Kavanagh in 1995–1996)	Succeeded by Terry Kavanagh
Preceded by John Byrne	Namor the Sub-Mariner writer 1993	Succeeded by Glenn Herdling
Preceded by Tom DeFalco	Editor-in-Chief of Marvel; 1995–2000	Succeeded by Joe Quesada
Preceded by Geoff Johns; Allan Heinberg	JLA writer 2005–2006	Succeeded by Brad Meltzer (Justice League of America vol. 2)
Preceded by Paul Levitz	Editor-in-Chief of DC Comics; 2010–2020	Succeeded by Marie Javins
