= Lineography =

Art of drawing without lifting the pen

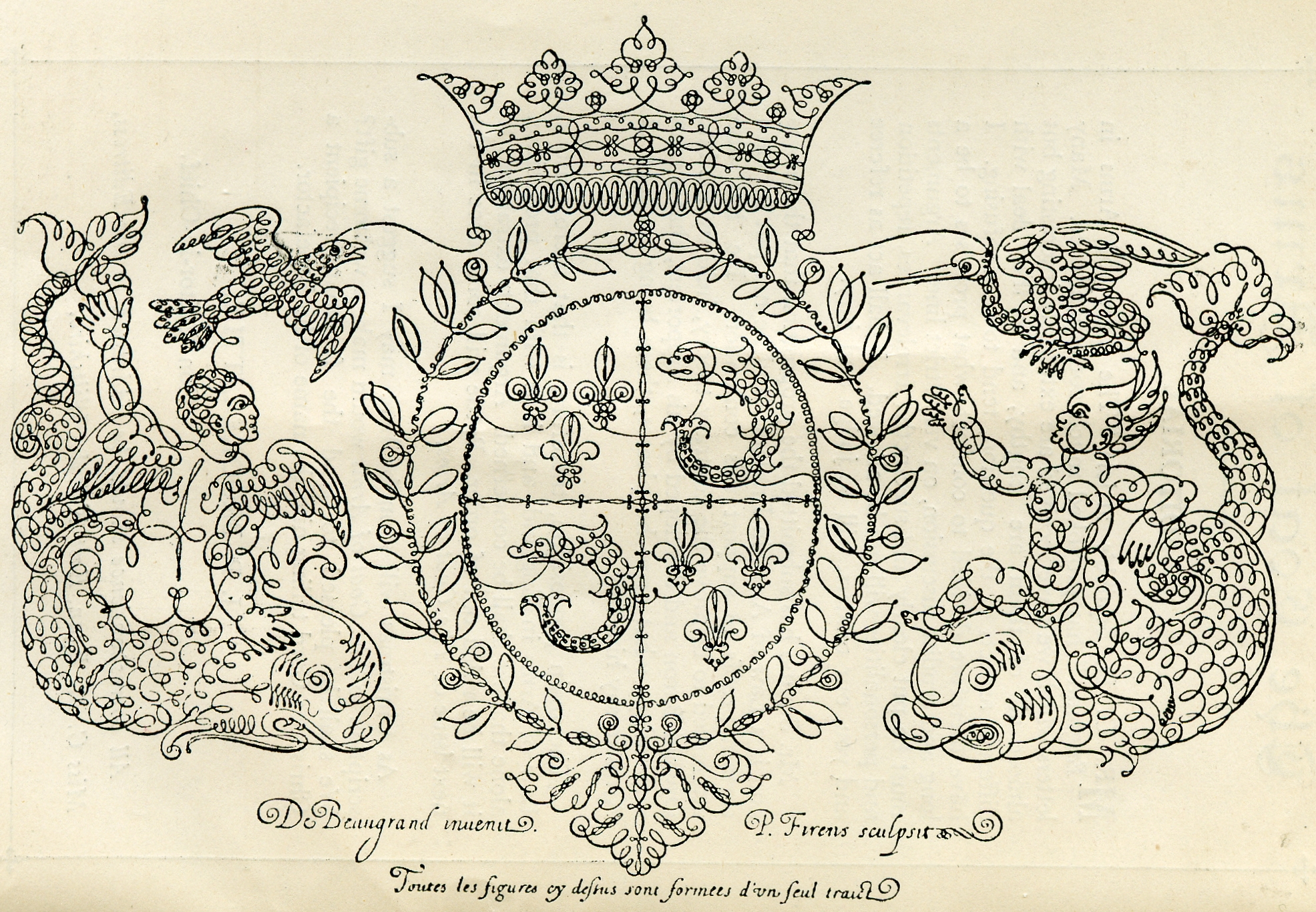
A lineographic representation of the arms of the Dauphin of France

Lineography is the art of drawing without lifting the pen, pencil, or paintbrush that is being used.

The practice originated in France in the seventeenth century. It fell into disuse by the early nineteenth century. Lineography experienced a resurgence in 1960 with the release of the Etch A Sketch.

In some instances, entire landscapes and still lifes have been drawn or painted using this lineographic technique. Famous works of art, such as the Mona Lisa, have been reproduced using the Etch A Sketch.

Pablo Picasso also drew in the lineography style. In his later career, after the surrealism period, he created a collection of over fifty drawings using the lineographic technique and a variety of media. The drawings mostly depict animals.

The television show How It's Made used Lineography in the short segments at the beginnings of many episodes giving a summary of the history of the episode's subject.

== See also ==
- Line art
- Jean de Beaugrand
