= Interlego AG v Tyco Industries Inc =

Case in copyright law

Interlego v Tyco Industries
- Court: Judicial Committee of the Privy Council
- Full case name: Interlego A.G. v (1) Tyco Industries Inc, (2) Tyco (Hong Kong) Limited, (3) The Refined Industry Co. Limited and (4) Denifer Technology Limited
- Decided: 5 May 1988
- Citations: 1 BLR 271, [1988] 2 FTLR 133, [1988] RPC 343, [1988] 3 All ER 949, [1988] 3 WLR 678, [1988] UKPC 3, [1989] AC 217

Court membership
- Judges sitting: Lord Keith of Kinkel, Lord Templeman, Lord Ackner, Lord Oliver of Aylmerton and Lord Jauncey of Tullichettle

Interlego AG v Tyco Industries Inc ([1989] AC 217, also known informally as the Lego case or the Lego brick case) was a case in copyright law that originated in Hong Kong that eventually went before the Judicial Committee of the Privy Council in the United Kingdom.

== Action ==
The plaintiff, Interlego AG, sued the defendant, Tyco Industries, for copyright infringement of its Lego bricks, which were already protected as a registered design. Under section 10 of the Copyright Act 1956, the right to protection as a registered design and copyright were not cumulative rights, and a design could only be protected under one or the other. Copyright was a stronger right than protection as a registered design, however, as it had a longer duration.

Thus Interlego moved for the court to determine that its bricks did not qualify for design protection under section 10 of the Copyright Act, so that they could qualify for copyright protection. To do so, the court had to apply a test to determine whether the bricks comprised a degree of aesthetic appeal, above the purely functional elements of their design, which would limit them to qualify as registered designs only.

To extend protection under the Copyright Act, the plaintiff argued that it had made revisions to its design drawings, and that as such they comprised original artistic works. The Copyright Act gave extensive protection to such drawings, including defining the making of an object from such a drawing an infringement of copyright, or that copying an object directly, without reference to its design drawings, constituted infringement of the copyright in the drawings.

== Judgement ==
The court held that the bricks qualified for registered design protection only, and thus did not qualify for copyright protection. Lord Oliver wrote:

Inevitably a designer who sets out to make a model brick is going to end up by producing a design, in essence brick shaped. ... There is clearly scope in the instant case for that argument that what gives the Lego brick its individuality and the originality without which it would fail for want of novelty as a registrable design is the presence of features which serve only the functional purpose of enabling it to interlock effectively with the adjoining bricks above and below.

The court further held that design drawings were a combination of both artistic and literary works. The written matter on such a drawing comprised the literary matter, and the graphics the artistic matter.

The only changes made to the drawings were alterations to some radii and to the dimensions of some elements:

Take the simplest case of artistic copyright, a painting or a photograph. It takes great skill, judgement and labour to produce a good copy by painting or to produce an enlarged photograph from a positive print, but no-one would reasonably contend that the copy, painting, or enlargement was an "original" artistic work in which the copier is entitled to claim copyright. Skill, labour or judgement merely in the process of copying cannot confer originality.

Lord Oliver held that to afford copyright protection on a copy of a work, "[t]here must in addition be some element of material alteration or embellishment which suffices to make the totality of the work an original work". He stated that such an alteration or embellishment must be "visually significant", and that it is insufficient simply for the alteration to convey "information". Thus the court held that the modifications that Interlego had made to its designs did not constitute an original work, and thus were not afforded copyright protection. Although they may have involved skill, labour, and judgement, that skill, labour, and judgement lay solely in the process of copying.
