= Tyco Toys =

Defunct toy manufacturer

- Formerly: Mantua Metal Products (1926–1957)
- Type: Private (1926–1970); Subsidiary (1970–1997)
- Industry: Entertainment
- Founded: 1926
- Founder: John Tyler
- Defunct: 1997; 29 years ago
- Fate: Acquired by Mattel, became a brand of it
- Headquarters: Woodbury Heights, New Jersey, U.S.
- Products: Model trains; Slot cars; Radio-controlled vehicles; Dolls; Stereoscopes; Magnetic drawing boards
- Brands: View-Master; Magna Doodle; Sesame Street; Spy Gear; Matchbox (1992–97)
- Parent: Sara Lee Corp. (1970–97); Mattel (1997–2000s)
- Subsidiaries: Illco (1992–97); Ideal (1989–97)
- Website: mattel.com/tyco

Tyco Toys was an American toy manufacturer. It was acquired by Mattel in 1997, becoming one of its brands.

== History ==
=== Formation of Tyco ===
The company was established as Mantua Metal Products by John Tyler and Jim Thomas in 1926, producing model boats and electric motors to power them out of Mantua, New Jersey. They began to produce motors for train models of all sizes. Then, in 1933, the business was moved to Woodbury Heights, New Jersey. By 1937, Mantua began selling its own ready-to-run HO scale model train.

From 1942 to 1945, the production of model railroad products was suspended as the company participated in the manufacturing of precision measuring and mapping equipment for the U.S. Army and Navy in World War II. The company received the Army-Navy "E" Award for excellence in production in 1945. After the war, they converted the plant back to the production of model railroading equipment. Thomas left the company in 1947 to start his own train line. Mantua began using plastic in its trains starting in the 1950s.

Tyler Manufacturing Company was formed in 1953 by Tyler and marketing director Milt Grey to focus on ready-to-run trains for younger children. This new effort brought them into the toy business, where their offerings were sold at discount stores and toy stores in addition to hobby shops. Tyler's smaller trains also meant they could fit more on a shelf than competitors like Lionel and Marx. A wide range of slot cars and repair parts, track sections, controllers and accessories were also available. By 1957, the company had a roster of 11 locomotives. That year, Tyco became an official nameplate for its line of ready-to-run trains. In 1963, it also began selling HO scale electric racing, or 'slot car' sets.

In 1967, Mantua and Tyler Manufacturing Company were merged to create Tyco Industries. John Tyler's son Norman Tyler was named president of the combined entity. By the 1970s, Tyco shifted sales and marketing to a consumer-oriented, mass marketing focus.

=== Corporate ownership ===
In 1970, the company was sold to Consolidated Foods. Manufacturing was moved from New Jersey to Hong Kong and new, more fantastical trains were produced during this time. By 1972, the Mantua name was replaced by Tyco Industries, and the company moved to Mount Laurel, New Jersey. Tyco had become unprofitable and new leadership was brought in, including Richard Grey as president.

During the 1970s the train model market lost much of its former allure and Tyco's sales suffered due to the popularity of electronic toys. In order to withstand the public's dwindling interest in trains, the company began to diversify. In 1977, Norman Tyler, the son of Tyco's founder, bought the original factory and split off Mantua as a separate company.

In 1981, Consolidated sold Tyco to Savoy Industries, an investment group led by Benson Seltzer, for $18.6 million. While Grey maintained that the firm's future was in toys, Seltzer's goal was to turn it into a diversified conglomerate. Hoping to replace trains with something more suitable for the times, Tyco introduced its US-1 Trucking line of electric trucks. It proved to be an immediate success, though interest soon waned. The 1982 Tyco Catalog was the last to start off with H0-scale trains, signifying the company's change in priorities. In 1983, the company introduced Cliff Hangers.

In 1984, Tyco produced its own interlocking brick product, called Super Blocks. They were heavily marketed as compatible with Lego and Duplo, since the basic Lego patent expired in 1978. Lego sued Tyco in an attempt to halt the production of its Lego clone. Though Tyco won the case in 1987, limits were placed on the marketing and production of Super Blocks.

=== Public company ===
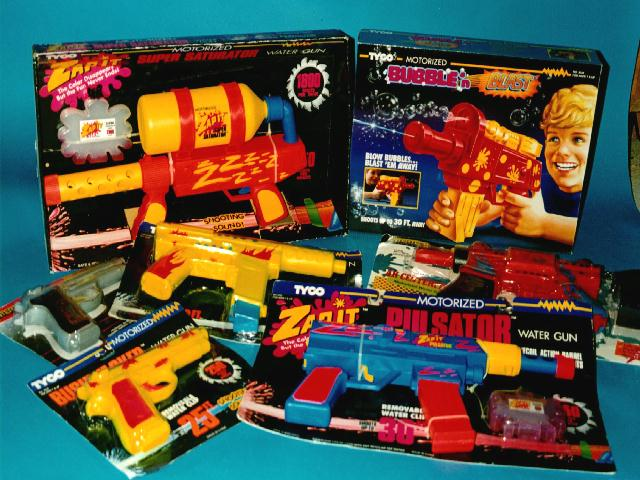
Battery operated water guns Playtime Tyco Amron

On February 20, 1986, Tyco became a publicly traded company and had $87.7 million in revenue that year. Tyco revamped its RC brand at this time, teaming with the Japanese company Taiyo to release radio controlled cars with more powerful motors and dynamic suspensions, capable of performing in rugged conditions. They started with five models in the 1986 catalog, including the Turbo Hopper, before filling a full 13 pages with RC cars in 1987. By 1988, 22 pages of the company's catalog were taken up by Tyco R/C toys.

In 1987, the company moved away from its trucking line and model train offerings, instead focusing on newer toys. It debuted Tyco Super Dough to compete with Play-Doh. Kenner quickly sued, citing similarities in the two products, but ultimately lost the case. Tyco debuted its Dino-Riders line of dinosaur-based action figures in 1988. A cartoon series was produced to help market the line.

In May 1989, the company purchased the View-Master Ideal Group, Inc., which brought the View-Master line of stereoscopes, Magna Doodle magnetic drawing toys, and Ideal Nursery line of dolls to Tyco. The company finished out the year with $384 million in revenue. Between 1989 and 1991, Tyco teamed with Sega Toys to distribute Pocket Power, a line of pocket-sized toys. A line for girls, called Pocket Pretties, was also developed.

Tyco's musical toys of the late 1980s and early 1990s included the Tyco Hot Lixx and Tyco Hot Keyz, an electronic guitar and keytar respectively.

After taking the company public, Seltzer was named chairman and maintained control of the board by filling it with family members and loyalists. In the years that followed, the company's stock valuation fell and revenue was impacted by Benson's self-serving investments. He lent money to and made acquisitions from his own companies. In 1988, he used Tyco's money to purchase an underwear company in Puerto Rico in which his family had an interest. Shareholders filed a lawsuit. By 1990, the situation came to a head. Seltzer and his two sons ultimately left the company and sold their remaining stock in July 1991. The news made Tyco's market valuation increase by 11%. President and CEO Richard Grey was then also named chairman.

Starting in the early 1990s, the company expanded internationally with its Tyco International operating unit. It opened wholly owned subsidiaries in the United Kingdom, Spain, France, Germany, Italy, Austria, Switzerland, Mexico, Canada, Belgium, Netherlands, Luxembourg, and Australia. In October 1990, it bought Stanley Cohen's Playtime Toys and turned the business into its direct import subsidiary.

In May 1992, Tyco purchased the Matchbox brand of scale model cars for $106 million. The acquisition helped the company expand in international markets, such as England and Germany. Tyco also purchased the Illco Toy Company in June, bringing Illco's extensive line of toys based on the children's show Sesame Street to Tyco. It then put a greater emphasis on licensing popular characters from other companies. Later that year, Tyco signed a 10-year licensing agreement with Children's Television Workshop and Illco became the Tyco Preschool subsidiary. The company consolidated its domestic packing and distribution operations near Portland, Oregon by closing its plant in Moorestown, New Jersey at the end of the year. Tyco had sales of $769 million in 1992. In the mid-1990s, as a bigger toy company, company headquarters was moved to Mount Laurel, New Jersey.

In the 1990s, the company also branched out with other toys such as airplanes. Its hit toy of 1990 was a set of small quintuplet dolls, called the Quints, developed by Bernard Loomis. With a growing stable of accessories, it had generated $20 million after 10 months on the market. It made a hit in 1991 with their Disney's Little Mermaid dolls that were released in conjunction with the movie. In 1993, Tyco became the first company to license Looney Tunes characters from Warner Bros. It also created the Power Plug, a third-party accessory that added turbo features and macros to a Sega Genesis or Super Nintendo game controller.

After 1993, Tyco exited the model train business. Gary Baughman was brought in as president in October 1994 and restructured the company. Tyco moved away from television and movie-related toy lines, refocusing the company on its classic offerings. The firm raised $96 million in a stock offering to pay down $40 million of debt. However, Tyco remained a distant third behind Mattel and Hasbro, bringing in $709.1 million in 1995. International operations were also consolidated into one central office in Belgium with satellite offices throughout Europe. However, the firm's overseas activity never rose above 25% of total sales. By 1996, Tyco had suffered three years of losses totalling $135.5 million.

Tyco's Sesame Street line increased dramatically in popularity in 1996, when the plush doll Tickle Me Elmo became the most sought-after toy of the Christmas season. The toy was released that July, with the company expecting to sell around 400,000 units. By December, Tyco had its four factories in China scrambling to produce 1 million units before Christmas.

=== Purchase by Mattel ===
In November 1996, Mattel announced it would acquire Tyco. At the time, Tyco was the third-largest toy company in the United States, with $709 million in sale the previous year. The combined company allowed Mattel to pair its strong distribution network with Tyco's products. It also meant Mattel would control a 19% share of the $13 billion U.S. toy market. The $755 million deal was approved by the FTC in March 1997 and nearly 10% (2,700 jobs) of the companies' combined workforce was eliminated. Mattel took a charge of $275 million for restructuring associated with the acquisition.

Tyco's Sesame Street, Magna Doodle, and View-Master toys were moved under Mattel's Fisher-Price brand. Matchbox, Tyco Electric Racing, and Tyco Radio Control products were placed under the Wheels division, alongside the Hot Wheels brand. In 2005, Tyco's Mount Laurel offices were closed and operations were transferred to Mattel's El Segundo, California headquarters.

Mantua Industries continued operations until October 2001, when its model railroad business was acquired by Model Power. Several items, such as steam engines and freight cars, were sold under its Mantua Classics brand. The Mantua brand name was then licensed to Model Rectifier Corporation in 2014 before being bought by Lionel Corporation in 2018.

On February 23, 2019, Terry Flynn announced that Tyco was now a registered trademark of his Harden Creek Slot Cars, LLC. Flynn also has the Life Like trademark for slot cars.

== In popular culture ==
Tyco's Mutator R/C car played a central role in the 1997 holiday-family comedy movie, Home Alone 3, where it is used as a concealer by the villains in a failed attempt to smuggle a highly classified electronic device into North Korea.

The company's Garfield telephone from the 1980s became an infamous symbol of pollution when, starting in the 1980s, hundreds of these phones began washing up on the shores of Brittany, France. This continued for 30 years, and the cause remained a mystery, until activists were able to find the source of the phones in 2019. A shipping container had been lost at sea and settled into a cave, where Garfield phones escaped into the environment for three decades.

== See also ==
- Interlego AG v Tyco Industries Inc
