= Ohio Art Company =

American toy company

The Ohio Art Company
- Company type: Public
- Traded as: Expert Market: OART
- Founded: Archbold, Ohio, 1908
- Founder: Henry Winzeler
- Headquarters: Bryan, Ohio
- Products: Toys, Games, Color Lithography
- Website: Ohioart.com

The Ohio Art Company is an American manufacturing company founded in 1908. Based in Bryan, Ohio, the company specializes in manufacturing custom metal lithography products for food container and specialty premium markets, including food tins, enclosures, DVD cases, and nostalgic signs. The company was previously a toy manufacturer.

== History ==
Henry Winzeler started his own manufacturing company in 1908. He rented an area to work in Archbold, Ohio, and named it the Ohio Art Company because of his interest in art and its location. Winzeler began making metal picture frames and various novelty items that were sold in retail stores across the United States. In 1912, the company moved to Bryan, Ohio, where it became even more successful with its Cupid Awake/Cupid Asleep picture frames. The Ohio Art Company then installed metal lithography equipment. This was used to produce picture frames made out of wood-grained metal sheets.

In 1917, the Ohio Art Company began manufacturing toys such as the windmills and climbing monkey. After World War I, the toy company grew exponentially, leading to the introduction of colorful tea sets and drums. In the late 1950s, a French electrician named André Cassagnes created a drawing toy that used a joystick, glass, and aluminum powder. The combination, which he called the "Telecran," gave users the ability to draw a picture and also erase it. After much collaboration, the system developed in the late 1950s is the same one used today. The name of the product was Etch A Sketch.

In the 1950s, W.C Killgallon began working for the Ohio Art Company. The Killgallon family still owns and operates the company. The final product of the Etch A Sketch was first produced on July 12, 1960, at the Bryan, Ohio factory. A toy produced by Ohio Art in the 1960s was the Bizzy Buzz Buzz, invented by Bernard Benson. Though the Ohio Art Company was very successful in the toy industry, the metal lithography sector of the company remains the core part of its business. It is one of the leading producers of specialty lithographic components.

In 1995, the Etch A Sketch toy was featured in the original Toy Story, in a scene where one performs a "quick draw" duel with Woody. This short 12 second feature was enough to give a significant sales boost, requiring the production line to work overtime to meet demand. By 1999, the company had again fallen into severe financial trouble from canceled orders of various products, reaching a point where the solvency of the company was in question. However, the company recovered with the prudent decision to agree to again have an Etch A Sketch appear in an animated feature film - this time in Toy Story 2. This scene featured an Etch A Sketch being used to present sketches related to the investigation of Woody's kidnapping. At 45 seconds, the scene in question was much longer than the scene in the original movie. The exposure from the highly successful Pixar movie resulted in sales of the toy increasing by 20 percent and ensured the survival of the company.

On February 11, 2016, The Ohio Art Company announced that it had sold its Etch A Sketch and Doodle Sketch brands to Canada-based Spin Master, in a move designed to allow it to focus on its metal lithography business and invest in its manufacturing operations in Bryan. Ohio Art's other toy lines were not included in the sale; however, the company no longer makes toys of any kind.

== Awards ==
- Nanoblock won Best Toy of the Year Award at the ASTRA trade show in 2011

== Sources ==
- Ohio Art Company website
