= Voodoo Highway Music & Post Inc. =

Canadian music composition company

- Industry: Music composition
- Founded: 2000; 26 years ago Toronto, Ontario, Canada
- Founders: Brian Pickett; James Chapple; David Kelly
- Website: www.voodoohighwaymusic.com

Voodoo Highway Music & Post Inc. is a collection of music composers based in Toronto, Canada, with additional studios in Seattle, Washington and Hollywood, California. The team consists of Brian Pickett, Graeme Cornies, David Kelly, and James Chapple.

The company has composed theme music for Almost Naked Animals, Total Drama, Stoked, Grojband, Peg + Cat, Noonbory and the Super Seven and MetaJets. Most of the music on Daniel Tiger's Neighborhood is produced by Voodoo, with the rest taken from the Mister Rogers' Neighborhood library of songs. The company also produced an original score for a $100,000 stop-motion recreation of Jurassic Park.

Voodoo Highway received a 2009 Gemini Award nomination for the original score of World of Quest. In 2016, the organization received two awards from the Society of Composers, Authors and Music Publishers of Canada for its music on PAW Patrol and Daniel Tiger's Neighborhood.
