= Outright Games =

British video game publisher

Outright Games Ltd.
- Industry: Video games
- Founded: 2016; 10 years ago
- Founder: Terry Malham; Terry Malham-Wallis; Stephanie Malham
- Headquarters: London, United Kingdom
- Key people: Terry Malham (CEO); Stephanie Malham (COO); Adam Whittaker (CFO)
- Products: Video games
- Website: outrightgames.com

Outright Games Ltd. is a British video game publisher focused on licensed games, mainly based on family-friendly properties similar to GameMill Entertainment. The company was co-founded in 2016 by Terry Malham as well as his children, Terry Malham-Wallis and Stephanie Malham. It operates offices in London and Madrid.

In May 2021, the company launched a mobile gaming division.

== Company philosophy ==
In a 2019 gamesindustry.biz interview, Nick Button-Brown, chair of Outright's board of directors, admits that licensed games for children are "a really narrow focus, but the argument is that it's quite a good niche. If you deliver a licensed game for a kid, you know it's going to sell a certain amount, and that Walmart are going to stock it. It's a good, solid niche." Button-Brown also claimed they were focused on developing games for traditional consoles as they are a "good, safe experience" compared to free-to-play mobile games whose business model has been controversial due to its pervasive use of microtransactions especially on titles marketed towards children, also tapping into the existing install base of consoles, whose previous owners hand down to their children or younger siblings to play on. "At the end of console cycles, licensed games tend to do particularly well."

== Games published ==
Year	Game	Type	Platforms	Developer	Ref.
2017	Ben 10	Action-adventure	Microsoft Windows, PlayStation 4, Xbox One, Nintendo Switch	Torus Games	
2018	Hotel Transylvania 3: Monsters Overboard	Action-adventure	Microsoft Windows, PlayStation 4, Xbox One, Nintendo Switch	Torus Games	
2018	Adventure Time: Pirates of the Enchiridion	Action-adventure	Microsoft Windows, PlayStation 4, Xbox One, Nintendo Switch	Climax Studios	
2018	Crayola Scoot	Action-adventure	Microsoft Windows, PlayStation 4, Xbox One, Nintendo Switch	Climax Studios	
2018	PAW Patrol: On a Roll	Action-adventure	Microsoft Windows, PlayStation 4, Xbox One, Nintendo Switch, Stadia	Torus Games	
2018	Steven Universe: Save the Light / OK K.O.! Let's Play Heroes 2 Games in 1	Action-adventure	PlayStation 4, Xbox One, Nintendo Switch	Grumpyface Studios / Capybara Games	
2019	DreamWorks Dragons: Dawn of New Riders	Action-adventure	Microsoft Windows, PlayStation 4, Xbox One, Nintendo Switch, Stadia	Climax Studios	
2019	UglyDolls: An Imperfect Adventure	Action-adventure	Microsoft Windows, PlayStation 4, Xbox One, Nintendo Switch	Well Played	
2019	Ice Age: Scrat's Nutty Adventure	Action-adventure	Microsoft Windows, PlayStation 4, Xbox One, Nintendo Switch, Stadia	Just Add Water	
2019	Race with Ryan	Racing	Microsoft Windows, PlayStation 4, Xbox One, Nintendo Switch	3DClouds	
2019	Jumanji: The Video Game	Action-adventure	Microsoft Windows, PlayStation 4, Xbox One, Nintendo Switch	Funsolve	
2020	Gigantosaurus: The Game	Action-adventure	Microsoft Windows, PlayStation 4, Xbox One, Nintendo Switch, Stadia	WildSphere	
2020	Trollhunters: Defenders of Arcadia	Action-adventure	Microsoft Windows, PlayStation 4, Xbox One, Nintendo Switch	WayForward	
2020	L.O.L. Surprise! Movie Maker	Simulation	Android, iOS	Graphite Lab	
2020	Zoids Wild: Blast Unleashed	Fighting	Nintendo Switch	Eighting	
2020	Ben 10: Power Trip	Action-adventure	Microsoft Windows, PlayStation 4, Xbox One, Nintendo Switch	PHL Collective	
2020	Transformers: Battlegrounds	Strategy	Microsoft Windows, PlayStation 4, Xbox One, Nintendo Switch	Coatsink	
2020	PAW Patrol Mighty Pups: Save Adventure Bay	Action-adventure	Microsoft Windows, PlayStation 4, Xbox One, Nintendo Switch, Stadia	Drakhar Studio	
2021	Bratz Total Fashion Makeover	Simulation	Android, iOS	Graphite Lab	
2021	DreamWorks Spirit: Lucky's Big Adventure	Adventure	Microsoft Windows, PlayStation 4, Xbox One, Nintendo Switch, Stadia	Aheartfulofgames	
2021	The Last Kids on Earth and the Staff of Doom	Action-adventure	Microsoft Windows, PlayStation 4, Xbox One, Nintendo Switch	Stage Clear Studios	
2021	PAW Patrol The Movie: Adventure City Calls	Action-adventure	Microsoft Windows, PlayStation 4, Xbox One, Nintendo Switch, Stadia	Drakhar Studio	
2021	The Addams Family: Mansion Mayhem	Action-adventure	Microsoft Windows, PlayStation 4, Xbox One, Nintendo Switch	PHL Collective	
2021	My Friend Peppa Pig	Adventure	Microsoft Windows, PlayStation 4, Xbox One, Nintendo Switch, Stadia	Petoons Studio	
2021	PJ Masks: Heroes Of The Night	Action-adventure	Microsoft Windows, PlayStation 4, Xbox One, Nintendo Switch, Stadia	Petoons Studio	
2021	Blaze and the Monster Machines Axle City Racers	Racing	Microsoft Windows, PlayStation 4, Xbox One, Nintendo Switch	3DClouds	
2021	Fast & Furious: Spy Racers Rise of SH1FT3R	Racing	Microsoft Windows, PlayStation 4, Xbox One, Nintendo Switch, Stadia	3DClouds	
2022	Ryan's Rescue Squad	Platformer	Microsoft Windows, PlayStation 4, PlayStation 5, Xbox One, Xbox Series X|S, Nintendo Switch, Stadia	Stage Clear Studios	
2022	Hotel Transylvania: Scary-Tale Adventures	Platformer	Microsoft Windows, PlayStation 4, Xbox One, Xbox Series X|S, Nintendo Switch	Drakhar Studio	
2022	My Little Pony: A Maretime Bay Adventure	Action-adventure	Microsoft Windows, PlayStation 4, Xbox One, Xbox Series X|S, Nintendo Switch	Melbot Studios	
2022	DC League of Super-Pets: The Adventures of Krypto and Ace	Action-adventure	Microsoft Windows, PlayStation 4, Xbox One, Nintendo Switch	PHL Collective	
2022	DreamWorks Dragons: Legends of the Nine Realms	Action-adventure-Platformer	Microsoft Windows, PlayStation 4, Xbox One, Xbox Series X|S, Nintendo Switch	Aheartfulofgames	
2022	Paw Patrol: Grand Prix	Racing	Microsoft Windows, PlayStation 4, PlayStation 5, Xbox One, Xbox Series X|S, Nintendo Switch, Stadia	3DClouds	
2022	L.O.L. Surprise!: B.B.s Born to Travel	Party	Microsoft Windows, PlayStation 4, PlayStation 5, Xbox One, Xbox Series X|S, Nintendo Switch, Stadia	Xaloc Studios	
2022	Star Trek Prodigy: Supernova	Action-adventure	Microsoft Windows, PlayStation 4, PlayStation 5, Xbox One, Xbox Series X|S, Nintendo Switch	Tessera Studios	
2022	JoJo Siwa: Worldwide Party	Rhythm	Microsoft Windows, PlayStation 4, PlayStation 5, Xbox One, Xbox Series X|S, Nintendo Switch, Stadia	Cocodrilo Dog Games	
2022	Cocomelon: Play with JJ	Platformer	Nintendo Switch	Sockmonkey Studios	
2022	Bratz: Flaunt Your Fashion	Simulation	Microsoft Windows, PlayStation 4, PlayStation 5, Xbox One, Xbox Series X|S, Nintendo Switch, Stadia	Petoons Studio	
2023	Peppa Pig: World Adventures	Adventure	Microsoft Windows, PlayStation 4, PlayStation 5, Xbox One, Xbox Series X|S, Nintendo Switch	Petoons Studio	
2023	Justice League: Cosmic Chaos	Action-adventure	Microsoft Windows, PlayStation 4, PlayStation 5, Xbox One, Xbox Series X|S, Nintendo Switch	PHL Collective	
2023	Gigantosaurus: Dino Kart	Racing	Microsoft Windows, PlayStation 4, PlayStation 5, Xbox One, Xbox Series X|S, Nintendo Switch	3DClouds	
2023	Baby Shark: Sing & Swim Party	Rhythm	Microsoft Windows, PlayStation 4, PlayStation 5, Xbox One, Xbox Series X|S, Nintendo Switch	Recotechnology S.L.	
2023	Rainbow High: Runway Rush	Adventure	Microsoft Windows, PlayStation 4, PlayStation 5, Xbox One, Xbox Series X|S, Nintendo Switch	Xaloc Studios	
2023	Paw Patrol World	Adventure-Racing	Microsoft Windows, PlayStation 4, PlayStation 5, Xbox One, Xbox Series X|S, Nintendo Switch	3DClouds	
2023	The Grinch: Christmas Adventures	Adventure	Microsoft Windows, PlayStation 4, PlayStation 5, Xbox One, Xbox Series X|S, Nintendo Switch	Casual Brothers Ltd.	
2023	Transformers: EarthSpark - Expedition	Action-adventure	Microsoft Windows, PlayStation 4, PlayStation 5, Xbox One, Xbox Series X|S, Nintendo Switch	Tessera Studios	
2023	Jumanji: Wild Adventures	Action-adventure	Microsoft Windows, PlayStation 4, PlayStation 5, Xbox One, Xbox Series X|S, Nintendo Switch	Cradle Games	
2023	Bluey: The Videogame	Adventure	Microsoft Windows, PlayStation 4, PlayStation 5, Xbox One, Xbox Series X|S, Nintendo Switch	Artax Games	
2024	PJ Masks Power Heroes: Mighty Alliance	Action-adventure	Microsoft Windows, PlayStation 4, PlayStation 5, Xbox One, Xbox Series X|S, Nintendo Switch	Petoons Studio	
2024	My Little Pony: A Zephyr Heights Mystery	Adventure	Microsoft Windows, PlayStation 4, PlayStation 5, Xbox One, Xbox Series X|S, Nintendo Switch	Drakhar Studio	
2024	Gigantosaurus: Dino Sports	Party	Microsoft Windows, PlayStation 4, PlayStation 5, Xbox One, Xbox Series X|S, Nintendo Switch	Infinigon S.L.	
2024	Teenage Mutant Ninja Turtles: Mutants Unleashed	Action-adventure	Microsoft Windows, PlayStation 4, PlayStation 5, Xbox One, Xbox Series X|S, Nintendo Switch	Aheartfulofgames	
2024	Barbie Project Friendship	Adventure	Microsoft Windows, PlayStation 4, PlayStation 5, Xbox One, Xbox Series X|S, Nintendo Switch	Xaloc Studios	
2024	Matchbox Driving Adventures	Racing	Microsoft Windows, PlayStation 4, PlayStation 5, Xbox One, Xbox Series X|S, Nintendo Switch	Casual Brothers Ltd.	
2024	Monster High: Skulltimate Secrets	Action-adventure	Microsoft Windows, PlayStation 4, PlayStation 5, Xbox One, Xbox Series X|S, Nintendo Switch	Casual Brothers Ltd. Petoons Studio	
2024	Nick Jr. Party Adventure	Platformer	Microsoft Windows, PlayStation 4, PlayStation 5, Xbox One, Xbox Series X|S, Nintendo Switch	Melbot Studios	
2024	Transformers: Galactic Trials	Action-adventure, Racing	Microsoft Windows, PlayStation 4, PlayStation 5, Xbox One, Xbox Series X|S, Nintendo Switch	3DClouds	
2024	SpongeBob SquarePants: The Patrick Star Game	Sandbox-Adventure	Microsoft Windows, PlayStation 4, PlayStation 5, Xbox One, Xbox Series X|S, Nintendo Switch	PHL Collective	
2025	Bratz: Rhythm & Style	Rhythm	Microsoft Windows, PlayStation 4, PlayStation 5, Xbox One, Xbox Series X|S, Nintendo Switch	Recotechnology S.L.	
2025	DreamWorks Gabby’s Dollhouse: Ready to Party	Adventure	Microsoft Windows, PlayStation 4, PlayStation 5, Xbox One, Xbox Series X|S, Nintendo Switch	Infinigon S.L.	
2025	NBA Bounce	Sports	Microsoft Windows, PlayStation 4, PlayStation 5, Xbox One, Xbox Series X|S, Nintendo Switch	Unfinished Pixel	
2025	The Grinch: Christmas Adventures: Merry & Mischievous Edition	Adventure	Microsoft Windows, PlayStation 4, PlayStation 5, Xbox One, Xbox Series X|S, Nintendo Switch	Casual Brothers Ltd.	
2025	Barbie Horse Trails	Adventure	Microsoft Windows, PlayStation 4, PlayStation 5, Xbox One, Xbox Series X|S, Nintendo Switch	PHL Collective	
2025	Dora: Rainforest Rescue	Action-adventure	Microsoft Windows, PlayStation 4, PlayStation 5, Xbox One, Xbox Series X|S, Nintendo Switch	Artax Games	
2025	Paw Patrol Rescue Wheels: Championship	Racing	Microsoft Windows, PlayStation 4, PlayStation 5, Xbox One, Xbox Series X|S, Nintendo Switch	3DClouds	
2025	Chicken Run: Eggstraction	Action	Microsoft Windows, PlayStation 4, PlayStation 5, Xbox One, Xbox Series X|S, Nintendo Switch	Aardman Games	
2025	The Elf on the Shelf: Christmas Heroes	Action-adventure	Microsoft Windows, PlayStation 4, PlayStation 5, Xbox One, Xbox Series X|S, Nintendo Switch	Casual Brothers Ltd.	
2026	Paw Patrol Dino World	Adventure	Microsoft Windows, PlayStation 4, PlayStation 5, Xbox One, Xbox Series X|S, Nintendo Switch	3DClouds	
2026	The Cat in the Hat: Rainy Day Mayhem	Party	Microsoft Windows, PlayStation 4, PlayStation 5, Xbox One, Xbox Series X|S, Nintendo Switch	Casual Brothers Ltd.	
2026	Sesame Street: Friends & Fun	Adventure	Microsoft Windows, PlayStation 4, PlayStation 5, Xbox One, Xbox Series X|S, Nintendo Switch	Infinigon S.L.	
2026	The Grinch 2: Saving Christmas	Adventure	Microsoft Windows, PlayStation 4, PlayStation 5, Xbox One, Xbox Series X|S, Nintendo Switch	Casual Brothers Ltd.	
2026	Hasbro Games Junior Collection	Party	Microsoft Windows, PlayStation 4, PlayStation 5, Xbox One, Xbox Series X|S, Nintendo Switch, Nintendo Switch 2	Casual Brothers Ltd.	
