= List of Daniel Tiger's Neighborhood episodes =

This is a list of episodes for the animated television series Daniel Tiger's Neighborhood.

== Series overview ==
Season	Episodes	Originally aired	
Season	Episodes	First aired	Last aired
1	40	September 3, 2012	February 21, 2014
2	20	August 18, 2014	July 4, 2016
3	25	September 5, 2016	July 10, 2018
4	18	July 11, 2018	January 10, 2020
5	20	August 17, 2020	May 18, 2022
6	18	September 5, 2022	May 8, 2024
7	15	August 12, 2024	January 27, 2026
8	TBA	June 29, 2026	TBA

== Episodes ==
=== Season 1 (2012–14) ===
No. Overall	No. in Season	Title	Original airdate	Prod. Code
1	1	"Daniel's Birthday"	September 3, 2012	1
1	1	"Daniel's Picnic"	September 3, 2012	1
2	2	"Daniel Visits School"	September 3, 2012	2
2	2	"Daniel Visits the Doctor"	September 3, 2012	2
3	3	"Daniel's Babysitter"	September 4, 2012	3
3	3	"Daniel Goes to School"	September 4, 2012	3
3	3	Theme	September 4, 2012	3
4	4	"Daniel Gets Mad"	September 5, 2012	4
4	4	"Katerina Gets Mad"	September 5, 2012	4
4	4	Theme	September 5, 2012	4
5	5	"Prince Wednesday Finds a Way to Play"	September 6, 2012	5
5	5	"Finding a Way to Play on Backwards Day"	September 6, 2012	5
5	5	Theme	September 6, 2012	5
6	6	"Daniel and Miss Elaina Play Rocketship"	September 7, 2012	6
6	6	"Daniel Plays at the Castle"	September 7, 2012	6
6	6	Theme	September 7, 2012	6
7	7	"Friends Help Each Other"	September 10, 2012	7
7	7	"Daniel Helps O Tell a Story"	September 10, 2012	7
7	7	Theme	September 10, 2012	7
8	8	"Something Special for Dad"	September 11, 2012	8
8	8	"I Love You, Mom"	September 11, 2012	8
8	8	Theme	September 11, 2012	8
9	9	"A Trip to the Enchanted Garden"	September 12, 2012	9
9	9	"A Trip to the Crayon Factory"	September 12, 2012	9
9	9	Theme	September 12, 2012	9
10	10	"Daniel Shares his Tigertastic Car"	September 13, 2012	11
10	10	"Katerina Shares Her Tutu"	September 13, 2012	11
10	10	Theme	September 13, 2012	11
11	11	"Prince Wednesday Goes to the Potty"	September 17, 2012	10
11	11	"Daniel Goes to the Potty"	September 17, 2012	10
11	11	Theme	September 17, 2012	10
12	12	"Fruit Picking Day"	September 18, 2012	12
12	12	"Daniel Is Big Enough to Help Dad"	September 18, 2012	12
12	12	Theme	September 18, 2012	12
13	13	"Daniel Waits for Show-And-Tell"	October 8, 2012	15
13	13	"A Night Out at the Restaurant"	October 8, 2012	15
13	13	Theme	October 8, 2012	15
14	14	"Thank You, Grandpere Tiger!"	November 19, 2012; Thanksgiving special	13
14	14	"Neighborhood Thank You Day"	November 19, 2012; Thanksgiving special	13
14	14	Theme	November 19, 2012; Thanksgiving special	13
15	15	"The Neighborhood Votes"	November 20, 2012	19
15	15	"The Class Votes"	November 20, 2012	19
15	15	Theme	November 20, 2012	19
16	16	"Be a Vegetable Taster!"	November 26, 2012	14
16	16	"Daniel Tries a New Food"	November 26, 2012	14
16	16	Theme	November 26, 2012	14
17	17	"Good Morning Daniel"	December 17, 2012	16
17	17	"Goodnight Daniel"	December 17, 2012	16
17	17	Theme	December 17, 2012	16
18	18	"Daniel Gets a Shot"	February 4, 2013	18
18	18	"A Stormy Day"	February 4, 2013	18
18	18	Theme	February 4, 2013	18
19	19	"Daniel Plays Ball"	February 11, 2013	17
19	19	"O Builds a Tower"	February 11, 2013	17
19	19	Theme	February 11, 2013	17
20	20	"Daniel's Sleepover"	February 12, 2013	20
20	20	"Backyard Camping"	February 12, 2013	20
20	20	Theme	February 12, 2013	20
21	21	"You are Special"	February 14, 2013	21
21	21	"Daniel is Special"	February 14, 2013	21
21	21	Theme	February 14, 2013	21
22	22	"The Dragon Dance"	April 1, 2013	22
22	22	"Teacher Harriet's Birthday"	April 1, 2013	22
22	22	Theme	April 1, 2013	22
23	23	"Neighborhood Clean Up"	April 22, 2013	23
23	23	"Clean Up Time"	April 22, 2013	23
23	23	Theme	April 22, 2013	23
24	24	"Super Daniel!"	May 6, 2013	24
24	24	"Play Pretend"	May 6, 2013	24
24	24	Theme	May 6, 2013	24
25	25	"Daniel Uses His Words"	May 20, 2013	25
25	25	"All Aboard"	May 20, 2013	25
25	25	Theme	May 20, 2013	25
26	26	"Daniel Says I'm Sorry"	May 21, 2013	26
26	26	"The Royal Sandbox"	May 21, 2013	26
26	26	Theme	May 21, 2013	26
27	27	"It's Time to Go"	May 22, 2013	29
27	27	"Daniel Doesn't Want to Stop Playing"	May 22, 2013	29
27	27	Theme	May 22, 2013	29
28	28	"Safety Patrol"	July 15, 2013	30
28	28	"Safety at the Beach"	July 15, 2013	30
28	28	Theme	July 15, 2013	30
29	29	"Neighbor Day"	September 2, 2013	31
29	29	Theme	September 2, 2013	31
30	30	"Calm at the Clock Factory"	September 3, 2013	27
30	30	"Calm for Storytime"	September 3, 2013	27
30	30	Theme	September 3, 2013	27
31	31	"Daniel's New Friend"	September 30, 2013	33
31	31	"Same and Different"	September 30, 2013	33
31	31	Theme	September 30, 2013	33
32	32	"Katerina's Costume"	October 28, 2013; Halloween special	28
32	32	"Dress Up Day"	October 28, 2013; Halloween special	28
32	32	Theme	October 28, 2013; Halloween special	28
33	33	"Snowflake Day"	November 25, 2013; winter holiday special	39
33	33	Theme	November 25, 2013; winter holiday special	39
34	34	"A Snowy Day"	December 2, 2013	32
34	34	"Tutu All the Time"	December 2, 2013	32
34	34	Theme	December 2, 2013	32
35	35	"Daniel Gets a Cold"	January 20, 2014	37
35	35	"Mom Tiger is Sick"	January 20, 2014	37
35	35	Theme	January 20, 2014	37
36	36	"Duckling Goes Home"	February 17, 2014	38
36	36	"Daniel Feels Left Out"	February 17, 2014	38
36	36	Theme	February 17, 2014	38
37	37	"Daniel Gets Frustrated"	February 18, 2014	34
37	37	"Frustration at School"	February 18, 2014	34
37	37	Theme	February 18, 2014	34
38	38	"Daniel is Jealous"	February 19, 2014	35
38	38	"Jealousy at the Treehouse"	February 19, 2014	35
38	38	Theme	February 19, 2014	35
39	39	"Daniel Learns about Empathy"; Alternate title: "Someone Else's Feelings"	February 20, 2014	40
39	39	"Empathy at School"	February 20, 2014	40
39	39	Theme	February 20, 2014	40
40	40	"Line Leader Daniel"	February 21, 2014	36
40	40	"Neighborhood Jobs"	February 21, 2014	36
40	40	Theme	February 21, 2014	36

=== Season 2 (2014–16) ===
No. overall	No. in season	Title	Original airdate	Prod. Code
41	1	"The Tiger Family Grows"	August 18, 2014	41
41	1	"Daniel Learns about Being a Big Brother"	August 18, 2014	41
41	1	Theme	August 18, 2014	41
42	2	"The Baby Is Here"	August 18, 2014	42
43	3	"Time for Daniel"	August 19, 2014	43
43	3	"There's Time for Daniel and Baby Too"	August 19, 2014	43
43	3	Theme	August 19, 2014	43
44	4	"Playtime Is Different"	August 20, 2014	44
44	4	"The Playground Is Different With Baby"	August 20, 2014	44
44	4	Theme	August 20, 2014	44
45	5	"Daniel Fixes Trolley"	November 3, 2014	45
45	5	"Problem Solver Daniel"	November 3, 2014	45
45	5	Theme	November 3, 2014	45
46	6	"Daniel's Friends Say No"	November 17, 2014	46
46	6	"Prince Wednesday Doesn't Want to Play"	November 17, 2014	46
46	6	Theme	November 17, 2014	46
47	7	"Daniel's Winter Adventure"	December 22, 2014;Christmas special	48
47	7	"Neighborhood Nutcracker"	December 22, 2014;Christmas special	48
47	7	Theme	December 22, 2014;Christmas special	48
48	8	"It's Love Day!"	February 9, 2015; Valentine's Day special	54
48	8	"Daniel's Love Day Surprise"	February 9, 2015; Valentine's Day special	54
48	8	Theme	February 9, 2015; Valentine's Day special	54
49	9	"Daniel Explores Nature"	April 20, 2015; Arbor Day special	56
49	9	"Daniel's Nature Walk"	April 20, 2015; Arbor Day special	56
49	9	Theme	April 20, 2015; Arbor Day special	56
50	10	"Miss Elaina Gets Hurt"	June 1, 2015	47
50	10	"Daniel Feels Better"	June 1, 2015	47
50	10	Theme	June 1, 2015	47
51	11	"Daniel Can't Ride Trolley"	June 22, 2015	49
51	11	"Daniel Can't Get What He Wants"	June 22, 2015	49
51	11	Theme	June 22, 2015	49
52	12	"Nighttime in the Neighborhood"	September 7, 2015	65
52	12	Theme	September 7, 2015	65
53	13	"A Storm in the Neighborhood"	September 8, 2015	50
53	13	"After the Neighborhood Storm"	September 8, 2015	50
53	13	Theme	September 8, 2015	50
54	14	"Margaret's First Chime Time"	September 9, 2015	64
54	14	"Tiger Family Fun"	September 9, 2015	64
54	14	Theme	September 9, 2015	64
55	15	"Looking for Snowball"	September 10, 2015	61
55	15	"Daniel's Neighbors Help"	September 10, 2015	61
55	15	Theme	September 10, 2015	61
56	16	"Daniel Makes a Mistake"	February 15, 2016	51
56	16	"Baking Mistakes"	February 15, 2016	51
56	16	Theme	February 15, 2016	51
57	17	"Daniel Thinks of Others"	February 16, 2016	52
57	17	"Daniel Thinks of What Margaret Needs"	February 16, 2016	52
57	17	Theme	February 16, 2016	52
58	18	"Daniel Takes Care of Snowball"	February 17, 2016	55
58	18	"Margaret's Bathtime"	February 17, 2016	55
58	18	Theme	February 17, 2016	55
59	19	"Friends and Feelings"	February 18, 2016	57
59	19	"Daniel's Day of Many Feelings"	February 18, 2016	57
59	19	Theme	February 18, 2016	57
60	20	"Daniel and Margaret Visit the Farm"	February 29, 2016	63
60	20	"Fireflies and Fireworks"	February 29, 2016	63
60	20	Theme	February 29, 2016	63

=== Season 3 (2016–18) ===
No. overall	No. in season	Title	Original airdate	Prod. Code
61	1	"No Red Sweater for Daniel"	September 5, 2016	53
61	1	"Teacher Harriet's New Hairdo"	September 5, 2016	53
61	1	Strategy	September 5, 2016	53
62	2	"Sharing at the Library"	September 6, 2016	59
62	2	"Daniel Shares with Margaret"	September 6, 2016	59
62	2	Strategy	September 6, 2016	59
63	3	"Daniel's Allergy"	September 7, 2016	69
63	3	"Allergies at School"	September 7, 2016	69
63	3	Strategy	September 7, 2016	69
64	4	"Daniel Makes a Noise Maker"	September 8, 2016	68
64	4	"Daniel Makes the Neighborhood"	September 8, 2016	68
64	4	Strategy	September 8, 2016	68
65	5	"The Neighborhood Fall Festival"	September 9, 2016	70
65	5	"Field Day at School"	September 9, 2016	70
65	5	Strategy	September 9, 2016	70
66	6	"Daniel and O's Road Trip"	January 16, 2017	71
66	6	"Daniel's Puppet Plan"	January 16, 2017	71
66	6	Strategy	January 16, 2017	71
67	7	"Daniel and Margaret Play School"	January 17, 2017	72
67	7	"Treasure Hunt at the Castle"	January 17, 2017	72
67	7	Strategy	January 17, 2017	72
68	8	"Daniel's Happy Song"	January 18, 2017	58
68	8	"Prince Wednesday's Happy Birthday"	January 18, 2017	58
68	8	Strategy	January 18, 2017	58
69	9	"The Lemonade Stand"	May 15, 2017	62
69	9	"Mad at the Beach"	May 15, 2017	62
69	9	Strategy	May 15, 2017	62
70	10	"Daniel Feels Two Feelings"	May 22, 2017	60
70	10	"The Neighborhood Carnival"	May 22, 2017	60
70	10	Strategy	May 22, 2017	60
71	11	"Tiger Family Trip"	May 29, 2017	66
71	11	Strategy	May 29, 2017	66
72	12	"Visiting Grandpere"	May 29, 2017	67
72	12	"The Tiger Family Goes Back Home"	May 29, 2017	67
72	12	Strategy	May 29, 2017	67
73	13	"Daniel's Bicycle"	July 10, 2017	73
73	13	"Katerina's Magic Trick"	July 10, 2017	73
73	13	Strategy	July 10, 2017	73
74	14	"Daniel Goes to Sleep"	July 11, 2017	74
74	14	"Prince Wednesday Sleeps Over"	July 11, 2017	74
74	14	Strategy	July 11, 2017	74
75	15	"Daniel Takes His Time"	July 12, 2017	76
75	15	"Sometimes It's Good to Go Slow"	July 12, 2017	76
75	15	Strategy	July 12, 2017	76
76	16	"King Daniel for the Day"	September 4, 2017	80
76	16	Strategy	September 4, 2017	80
77	17	"Firefighters at School"	September 5, 2017	75
77	17	"Daniel's Doll"	September 5, 2017	75
77	17	Strategy	September 5, 2017	75
78	18	"Daniel's Very Different Day"	September 6, 2017	81
78	18	"Class Trip to the Library"	September 6, 2017	81
78	18	Strategy	September 6, 2017	81
79	19	"Daniel Loves Tigey"	September 7, 2017	82
79	19	"Daniel Needs Tigey at School"	September 7, 2017	82
79	19	Strategy	September 7, 2017	82
80	20	"Daniel's Goldfish Dies"	February 26, 2018	77
80	20	"Daniel's Strawberry Seeds"	February 26, 2018	77
80	20	Strategy	February 26, 2018	77
81	21	"Daniel Wants to Be Alone"	May 7, 2018	83
81	21	"Daniel's Alone Space"	May 7, 2018	83
81	21	Strategy	May 7, 2018	83
82	22	"Daniel Gets Mad at Dad"	May 8, 2018	78
82	22	"Daniel Gets Mad at His Friends"	May 8, 2018	78
82	22	Strategy	May 8, 2018	78
83	23	"Daniel Doesn't Want to Go Potty"	May 9, 2018	79
83	23	"Daniel Sits on the Potty"	May 9, 2018	79
83	23	Strategy	May 9, 2018	79
84	24	"Circle Time Squabble"	July 9, 2018	84
84	24	"It's Not Okay to Hurt Someone"	July 9, 2018	84
84	24	Strategy	July 9, 2018	84
85	25	"Daniel Learns About Lizards"	July 10, 2018	85
85	25	"Daniel Wonders About Trolley"	July 10, 2018	85
85	25	Strategy	July 10, 2018	85

=== Season 4 (2018–20) ===
No. overall	No. in season	Title	Original airdate	Prod. Code
86	1	"Daniel Finds Something to Do"	September 11, 2018	86
86	1	"Daniel's Royal Good Time"	September 11, 2018	86
86	1	Strategy	September 11, 2018	86
87	2	"Daniel's Lunch"	September 18, 2018	87
87	2	"Daniel's Toy"	September 18, 2018	87
87	2	Strategy	September 18, 2018	87
88	3	"Jodi's First Day at School"	October 2, 2018	90
88	3	"Daniel Plays at Jodi's House"	October 2, 2018	90
88	3	Strategy	October 2, 2018	90
89	4	"A New Friend at School"	October 9, 2018	91
89	4	"A New Friend at the Playground"	October 9, 2018	91
89	4	Strategy	October 9, 2018	91
90	5	"Daniel Visits the Dentist"	January 8, 2019	92
90	5	"Daniel's First Haircut"	January 8, 2019	92
90	5	Strategy	January 8, 2019	92
91	6	"Daniel's Obstacle Course"	January 8, 2019	89
91	6	"Daniel Plays in a Gentle Way"	January 8, 2019	89
91	6	Strategy	January 8, 2019	89
92	7	"Daniel Learns to Ask First"	January 15, 2019	94
92	7	"Friends Ask First"	January 15, 2019	94
92	7	Strategy	January 15, 2019	94
93	8	"Jodi's Mama Travels for Work"	May 21, 2019	95
93	8	"The Tiger Family Babysits"	May 21, 2019	95
93	8	Strategy	May 21, 2019	95
94	9	"Daniel Does Gymnastics"	May 21, 2019	96
94	9	"The Big Slide"	May 21, 2019	96
94	9	Strategy	May 21, 2019	96
95	10	"Daniel's Blueberry Paws"	May 28, 2019	100
95	10	"Wow at the Library"	May 28, 2019	100
95	10	Strategy	May 28, 2019	100
96	11	"Margaret's Birthday Buddy"	September 17, 2019	88
96	11	"Margaret's Birthday Party"	September 17, 2019	88
96	11	Strategy	September 17, 2019	88
97	12	"Find What Makes Your Family Special"	September 17, 2019	93
97	12	"Family Day"	September 17, 2019	93
97	12	Strategy	September 17, 2019	93
98	13	"Daniel Likes to Be with Dad"	September 24, 2019	97
98	13	"Daniel Likes to Be with Mom"	September 24, 2019	97
98	13	Strategy	September 24, 2019	97
99	14	"The Family Campout"	October 1, 2019	98
99	14	"A Game Night for Everyone"	October 1, 2019	98
99	14	Strategy	October 1, 2019	98
100	15	"Daniel's Grr-ific Grandpere"	October 8, 2019	99
100	15	"Making Mozies with Nana"	October 8, 2019	99
100	15	Strategy	October 8, 2019	99
101	16	"Daniel's Tiger Twirl"	January 7, 2020	101
101	16	"You Can Play Your Own Way"	January 7, 2020	101
101	16	Strategy	January 7, 2020	101
102	17	"Calm at the Restaurant"	January 7, 2020	102
102	17	"Calm in Class"	January 7, 2020	102
102	17	Strategy	January 7, 2020	102
103	18	"Mad at the Crayon Factory"	January 14, 2020	103
103	18	"Mad at School"	January 14, 2020	103
103	18	Strategy	January 14, 2020	103

=== Season 5 (2020–22) ===
No. overall	No. in season	Title	Original airdate	Prod. Code
104	1	"Won't You Sing Along with Me?"	August 17, 2020	104
104	1	Strategy	August 17, 2020	104
105	2	"Daniel's Substitute Teacher"	August 17, 2020	109
105	2	Strategy	August 17, 2020	109
106	3	"Prince Wednesday's Accident"	August 18, 2020	105
106	3	"Daniel and Miss Elaina's Kite Accident"	August 18, 2020	105
106	3	Strategy	August 18, 2020	105
107	4	"Quiet Time at School"	August 19, 2020	106
107	4	"Naptime in Blanket City"	August 19, 2020	106
107	4	Strategy	August 19, 2020	106
108	5	"The Fire Drill"	January 6, 2021	108
108	5	"Daniel and Mom Go to the Market"	January 6, 2021	108
108	5	Strategy	January 6, 2021	108
109	6	"Daniel Waits with Dad"	January 13, 2021	107
109	6	"Margaret's New Shoes"	January 13, 2021	107
109	6	Strategy	January 13, 2021	107
110	7	"Daniel Meets a New Friend"	April 5, 2021	110
110	7	"A New Friend at the Clock Factory"	April 5, 2021	110
110	7	Strategy	April 5, 2021	110
111	8	"Jodi's Asthma"	April 6, 2021	113
111	8	"Daniel and Max Play at the Playground"	April 6, 2021	113
111	8	Strategy	April 6, 2021	113
112	9	"Daniel's Rocking Chair"	April 7, 2021	111
112	9	"Prince Wednesday Gives Away His Book"	April 7, 2021	111
112	9	Strategy	April 7, 2021	111
113	10	"Daniel Does It Himself"	April 8, 2021	115
113	10	"Daniel Learns to Swing"	April 8, 2021	115
113	10	Strategy	April 8, 2021	115
114	11	"Margaret's First Thank You Day"	August 19, 2021	116
114	11	Strategy	August 19, 2021	116
115	12	"Daniel Goes to the Hospital"	August 26, 2021	114
115	12	Strategy	August 26, 2021	114
116	13	"Prince Tuesday Goes to College"	September 2, 2021	112
116	13	"Daniel Misses Grandpere"	September 2, 2021	112
116	13	Strategy	September 2, 2021	112
117	14	"Tiger Family Lunch"	September 9, 2021	118
117	14	"Dinnertime at Jodi's"	September 9, 2021	118
117	14	Strategy	September 9, 2021	118
118	15	"Daniel and Miss Elaina Bake Pretzels"	September 16, 2021	119
118	15	"O Gives Daniel Space"	September 16, 2021	119
118	15	Strategy	September 16, 2021	119
119	16	"The Neighborhood Snowstorm"	December 23, 2021	124
119	16	Strategy	December 23, 2021	124
120	17	"Daniel Listens to Dad"	January 13, 2022	123
120	17	"Daniel and Katerina Listen"	January 13, 2022	123
120	17	Strategy	January 13, 2022	123
121	18	"Margaret Gets All the Attention"	January 20, 2022	117
121	18	"Prince Tuesday Visits"	January 20, 2022	117
121	18	Strategy	January 20, 2022	117
122	19	"Jodi's Lemonade Stand"	May 19, 2022	121
122	19	"Daniel Remembers What He Needs"	May 19, 2022	121
122	19	Strategy	May 19, 2022	121
123	20	"Daniel Follows the Rules at the Pool"	May 26, 2022	120
123	20	"Daniel's First Swim Class"	May 26, 2022	120
123	20	Strategy	May 26, 2022	120
124	21	"Disappointed at the Pool"	June 2, 2022	122
124	21	"Disappointed at the Farm"	June 2, 2022	122
124	21	Strategy	June 2, 2022	122

=== Season 6 (2022–24) ===
No. overall	No. in season	Title	Original airdate
125	1	"Daniel's New Babysitter"	September 5, 2022
125	1	"Daniel Sleeps at the Treehouse"	September 5, 2022
125	1	Strategy	September 5, 2022
126	2	"Daniel Feels Worried About Mom"	September 6, 2022
126	2	"Jodi Loses Benji"	September 6, 2022
126	2	Strategy	September 6, 2022
127	3	"Jodi Tries Ballet"	September 7, 2022
127	3	"Daniel Tries Something New With Grandpere"	September 7, 2022
127	3	Strategy	September 7, 2022
128	4	"Daniel Goes to Day Camp"	September 8, 2022
128	4	"Daniel's Rainy Day at Camp"	September 8, 2022
128	4	Strategy	September 8, 2022
129	5	"Daniel Gives a Gift"	January 10, 2023
129	5	"Daniel Receives a Gift"	January 10, 2023
129	5	Strategy	January 10, 2023
130	6	"Miss Elaina's Bandage"	January 10, 2023
130	6	"A Fair Place to Play"	January 10, 2023
130	6	Strategy	January 10, 2023
131	7	"Mr. Malik Comes Back to School"	January 17, 2023
131	7	"Daniel's Wintry Walk"	January 17, 2023
131	7	Strategy	January 17, 2023
132	8	"The Neighborhood Wedding"	June 6, 2023
132	8	Strategy	June 6, 2023
133	9	"Daniel and Miss Elena's Obstacle Course"	June 13, 2023
133	9	"Daniel and O's Magic Show"	June 13, 2023
133	9	Strategy	June 13, 2023
134	10	"Grandpere Sleeps Over"	June 20, 2023
134	10	"Tea Party at the Castle"	June 20, 2023
134	10	Strategy	June 20, 2023
135	11	"Daniel Helps Take Care of Margaret"	August 15, 2023
135	11	"The Dinosaur Playground"	August 15, 2023
135	11	Strategy	August 15, 2023
136	12	"An Important Job at the Market"	August 15, 2023
136	12	"Important Jobs at the Enchanted Garden"	August 15, 2023
136	12	Strategy	August 15, 2023
137	13	"Taking Turns at Show and Tell"	August 22, 2023
137	13	"Taking Turns at the Pool"	August 22, 2023
137	13	Strategy	August 22, 2023
138	14	"Daniel and Max Ask to Play"	August 29, 2023
138	14	"Daniel Plays at the Music Shop"	August 29, 2023
138	14	Strategy	August 29, 2023
139	15	"Juan Carlos Visits the Neighborhood"	January 2, 2024
139	15	"Daniel Shows Juan Carlos the Clock Factory"	January 2, 2024
139	15	Strategy	January 2, 2024
140	16	"Daniel and Miss Elaina Put Their Things Away"	May 7, 2024
140	16	"Daniel and Prince Wednesday Put Their Things Away"	May 7, 2024
140	16	Strategy	May 7, 2024
141	17	"Pizza Day at School"	May 7, 2024
141	17	"Daniel and Jodi Like Different Things"	May 7, 2024
141	17	Strategy	May 7, 2024
142	18	"Daniel's Surprising Day"	May 14, 2024
142	18	"Daniel Makes a Surprise"	May 14, 2024
142	18	Strategy	May 14, 2024

=== Season 7 (2024–26) ===
No. overall	No. in season	Title	Original airdate
143	1	"Something New About Trolley"	August 12, 2024
143	1	Strategy	August 12, 2024
144	2	"Daniel Asks What Friends Like"	August 13, 2024
144	2	"Miss Elaina's Space Restaurant"	August 13, 2024
144	2	Strategy	August 13, 2024
145	3	"Daniel Doesn't Want to Miss Out"	August 14, 2024
145	3	"Cousins at the Castle"	August 14, 2024
145	3	Strategy	August 14, 2024
146	4	"Daniel and O Make Deliveries"	August 15, 2024
146	4	"Jodi Makes a Boat with Max"	August 15, 2024
146	4	Strategy	August 15, 2024
147	5	"Daniel and Mom Make a Treat"	January 6, 2025
147	5	"Jodi Sleeps at Her Dad's House"	January 6, 2025
147	5	Strategy	January 6, 2025
148	6	"Daniel Does It His Way"	January 7, 2025
148	6	"Katerina and O Go Ice Skating"	January 7, 2025
148	6	Strategy	January 7, 2025
149	7	"Daniel and Dad Say Sorry"	January 8, 2025
149	7	"O The Owl Says Sorry"	January 8, 2025
149	7	Strategy	January 8, 2025
150	8	"Daniel Finds Out What's Fair"	January 9, 2025
150	8	"O Finds Out What's Fair"	January 9, 2025
150	8	Strategy	January 9, 2025
151	9	"Daniel and Max Visit the Farm"	May 12, 2025
151	9	"Prince Wednesday's Pet"	May 12, 2025
151	9	Strategy	May 12, 2025
152	10	"Daniel Pretends at the Pool"	May 13, 2025
152	10	"Chrissie Pretends at the Library"	May 13, 2025
152	10	Strategy	May 13, 2025
153	11	"Daniel Uses a New Bathroom"	August 11, 2025
153	11	"The Neighborhood Concert"	August 11, 2025
153	11	Strategy	August 11, 2025
154	12	"Daniel and Grandpere Go Slow"	August 12, 2025
154	12	"Katerina and Josie Make Mozies"	August 12, 2025
154	12	Strategy	August 12, 2025
155	13	"Daniel Helps at the Crayon Factory"	August 13, 2025
155	13	"Miss Elaina Swims"	August 13, 2025
155	13	Strategy	August 13, 2025
156	14	"Daniel Helps Teddy"	January 26, 2026
156	14	"Miss Elaina Is Brave at the Dentist"	January 26, 2026
156	14	Strategy	January 26, 2026
157	15	"Daniel Plays T-Ball"	January 27, 2026
157	15	"Max Plays at the Library"	January 27, 2026
157	15	Strategy	January 27, 2026

=== Season 8 (2026–) ===
No. overall	No. in season	Title	Original airdate
158	1	"Grownups Come Back to the Music Shop"	June 29, 2026
158	1	"Katerina's Mommy Comes Back Home"	June 29, 2026
158	1	Strategy	June 29, 2026
159	2	"Daniel Asks Before Touching Someone Else"	August 10, 2026
159	2	"Jodi Asks Before Touching Someone Else"	August 10, 2026
159	2	Strategy	August 10, 2026
160	3	"Daniel's Morning Routine with Grandpere"	August 11, 2026
160	3	"Miss Elaina Gets Ready for Bed"	August 11, 2026
160	3	Strategy	August 11, 2026
161	4	"New Year's Eve in the Neighborhood"	2026
161	4	Strategy	2026
