= Crayola Scoot =

2018 video game

- Developer: Climax Studios
- Publisher: Outright Games
- Series: Crayola
- Engine: Unity
- Platforms: Microsoft Windows; Nintendo Switch; PlayStation 4 Xbox One
- Release: NA: October 16, 2018; EU: October 23, 2018
- Genre: Sports
- Modes: Single-player, multiplayer

Crayola Scoot is a sports video game developed by Climax Studios and published by Outright Games. It is based on the Crayola brand, taking heavy inspiration from games such as Splatoon with a similar paint/ink mechanic and the Tony Hawk's Pro Skater series instead riding a scooter rather than a skateboard, performing tricks and combos to complete challenges. It was released on October 16, 2018, in North America and October 23, 2018, in Europe for Microsoft Windows, Nintendo Switch, PlayStation 4, and Xbox One. Digital releases have since been delisted from all platforms.

== Reception ==
On Metacritic, the Nintendo Switch and Xbox One versions of Crayola Scoot received average scores of 74% and 66% respectively based on five reviews for each platform, indicating "mixed or average" reviews. Fellow review aggregator OpenCritic assessed that the game received fair approval, being recommended by 9% of critics.
