= SpongeBob SquarePants: The Patrick Star Game =

2024 video game

- Developer: PHL Collective
- Publisher: Outright Games
- Series: SpongeBob SquarePants
- Engine: Unity
- Platforms: Microsoft Windows; Nintendo Switch; PlayStation 4; PlayStation 5; Xbox One; Xbox Series X/S; iOS
- Release: October 4, 2024 iOS; October 2025
- Genres: Platform, adventure

SpongeBob SquarePants: The Patrick Star Game is a 2024 platform game developed by PHL Collective and published by Outright Games, centered on SpongeBob SquarePants character Patrick Star. The game was released on October 4, 2024 for Nintendo Switch, PlayStation 4, PlayStation 5, Xbox One, Xbox Series X/S, and Windows. The game was released in October 2025 for iOS.

== Gameplay ==
The Patrick Star Game is a third-person physics-based sandbox game where players can interact with almost everything in Bikini Bottom as they can pick up hammers, bash through buildings, use reef blowers to suck in items or Bikini Bottomites to fire at targets, and giant magnets to swing heavy objects around. Players can also complete tasks to earn sand dollars and unlock costumes. There are also minigames and quests players can play and complete in the game; each quest would give the player sand dollars.

== Development ==
Developer PHL Collective is based in Philadelphia. Outright Games announced the game in August 2024, with a trailer released alongside the announcement.

== Release ==
The Patrick Star Game was released on Nintendo Switch, PlayStation 4, PlayStation 5, Xbox One, Xbox Series X/S, and Windows on October 4, 2024. The iOS version was released in October 2025.

== Reception ==
Reception

Aggregate scores
Aggregator	Score
Metacritic	66/100 (XBSX); 65/100 (PC)
OpenCritic	21% recommend

Review score
Publication	Score
IGN	5/10

IGN gave the game a 5/10, calling the game "a simple physics-based adventure that lacks the heart to make a splash". The PC version was rated a 65, the Xbox Series X was rated a 66, and PlayStation 5 version was rated a 67 on the review aggregation website Metacritic, indicating "mixed or average" reviews. Fellow review aggregator OpenCritic assessed that the game received weak approval, being recommended by only 21% of critics.

Daniel Waite of Movies Games and Tech gave a positive review on the game, rating it an 8/10, writing that "replay value and longevity are at an all-time high" and that there is "plenty to see and do in this child-friendly game."
