= Paw Patrol =

Canadian children's animated television series

- Genre: Action; Adventure; Comedy
- Created by: Keith Chapman
- Developed by: Scott Kraft
- Directed by: Jamie Whitney (#1–58); Charles E. Bastien (#59–260); Paul Brown (#261–299); Dipesh Mistry (#291–)
- Voices of: Owen Mason; Elijha Hammill; Jaxon Mercey; Joey Nijem; Beckett Hipkiss; Kai Harris; Benjamin Sivecic; Tristan Samuel; Max Calinescu; Justin Paul Kelly; Luke Dietz; Gage Munroe; Drew Davis; Lukas Engel; Kingsley Marshall; Christian Corrao; Jesse Gervasi; Kallan Holley; Lilly Bartlam; Stuart Ralston; Samuel Faraci; Jackson Reid; Matteo Gutierrez; Billy Quinn; Devan Cohen; Keegan Hedley; Lucien Duncan-Reid; Emily Thorne; Carter Thorne; Shayle Simons; Jordan Mazeral; Ron Pardo
- Theme music composer: Michael Smidi Smith; Scott Krippayne
- Opening theme: "Paw Patrol Theme Song" performed by Scott Simons
- Ending theme: "Paw Patrol Theme Song" (instrumental)
- Composer: Voodoo Highway Music & Post Inc.
- Country of origin: Canada
- Original language: English
- No. of seasons: 14
- No. of episodes: 320 (list of episodes)

Production
- Executive producers: Jennifer Dodge; Laura Clunie; Ronnen Harary; Keith Chapman; Ursula Ziegler-Sullivan; Scott Kraft; Toni Stevens; Jeff Borkin
- Producer: Patricia Burns
- Running time: 22–23 minutes
- Production companies: Guru Studio; Spin Master Entertainment (Note: As Spin Master Paw Productions (Note: Numbered for each season) Inc.); Nickelodeon Productions

Original release
- Network: Nickelodeon (United States); TVOKids (Canada)
- Release: August 12, 2013 – present

Related
- Rubble & Crew

Paw Patrol is a Canadian children's animated television series created by Keith Chapman and produced by Spin Master Entertainment, with animation provided by Guru Studio. In Canada, the series is primarily broadcast on TVOntario as part of the TVOKids programing block. TVO first ran previews of the show in August 2013. The series premiered on Nickelodeon in the United States on August 12, 2013.

The series focuses on a young boy named Ryder who leads a crew of police dogs, firehouse dogs, and search and rescue dogs that call themselves the Paw Patrol. They work together on missions to protect the shoreside community of Adventure Bay and surrounding areas. Each dog has a specific set of skills based on emergency services professions, such as a firefighter, a construction worker, a police officer, a recycler, a maritime search and rescuer, and an aircraft pilot. They reside in doghouses that transform into customized vehicles or "pupmobiles" for their missions. They are equipped with special hi-tech backpacks called "pup packs" that contain tools relating to their respective job.

Since its debut, the series has developed into one of the highest-grossing media franchises of all time, generating billions of dollars in revenue from toy sales for Spin Master and has increased the company's presence in the preschool toy market. The franchise includes Paw Patrol: The Movie which released in August 2021, followed by a sequel, The Mighty Movie, on September 29, 2023, another sequel The Dino Movie, on August 14, 2026, and a spin-off series based on one of the show's main characters titled Rubble & Crew which premiered in February 2023. The show celebrated its 10th anniversary in 2023. The show, and its associated products, have received a variety of awards and nominations from associations such as the Academy of Canadian Cinema & Television and the Academy of Television Arts & Sciences.

The series is on its fourteenth season, which began airing in July 2026. In early February 2023, series creator Keith Chapman said in an interview with The Hollywood Reporter magazine that the series could still be on television for another ten years or more.

== Plot ==
Each episode of Paw Patrol follows a similar formula. Episodes normally open with a scene depicting the dogs going about their everyday lives in Adventure Bay, often playing with dog toys or going to the local playground. Ryder, a ten-year-old boy, is advised of a problem by receiving a call for help or by witnessing a situation himself. His most frequent callers are an accident-prone marine biologist named Cap'n Turbot and the town's mayor, Mayor Goodway. Ryder always alerts the dogs via their blinking pup tags. The team members report to their base, the Lookout, and enter its elevator. Marshall typically arrives last causing a humorous mishap that makes the other pups laugh as the elevator rises, although Rubble causes the elevator gag in some episodes. When they reach the top floor, they arrange themselves in a line. Chase announces that the team is ready for action as Ryder tells the pups what has happened. He chooses several members of the team, normally two or three first responders, to help solve whatever problem has emerged. They ride a slide down to their vehicles and complete their mission. The Paw Patrol's missions include rescuing people, stopping different dangers, and thwarting the devious plots of Mayor Humdinger of Foggy Bottom in later episodes. When they have finished, Ryder says his catchphrase "Whenever you're in trouble, just yelp for help!" (or a variation of that in later episodes) and congratulates the dogs.

=== Sub-series ===
Later episodes introduce sub-series with a specific theme:

- "Air Pups" is where Air Patroller and other flying equipment is used to perform aerial rescues.
- "Mission: PAW" has the team operating as undercover spies in the kingdom of Barkingburg. There, they help the Princess of Barkingburg and the Earl of Barkingburg while contending with the Princess of Barkingburg's dog Sweetie.
- "Sea Patrol" centers on aquatic missions. The team contends with the pirate captain Sid Swashbuckle and his dog companion Arrby.
- "Ultimate Rescue" involves higher-stakes missions depending on just one job with everybody involved.
- "Mighty Pups" involves the team operating as superheroes after gaining superpowers from exposure to a meteor. Their enemies include Mayor Humdinger's nephew Harold, Ladybird, and Copycat.
- "Dino Rescue" has the team operating in the Dino Wilds.
- "Moto Pups" has the team working with Wild and battling a dog biker gang called the Ruff-Ruff Pack.
- "Rescue Knights" has the team operate as knights and battling Claw, a former knight who is accompanied by the dragon Sparks and allied with the Duke of Flappington.
- "Cat Pack" has the team working with the eponymous Cat Pack, a group of cats led by Wild who utilize high-tech gear.
- "Big Truck Pups" has the team working with Al, a dog who rides a big truck.
- "Aqua Pups" has the team working with Coral, a Mer-pup and Skye's cousin, while contending with the rogue Mer-pup Moby. Mer-pups are creatures who resemble dogs, but with a fish-like tail in place of their hind legs.
- "Jungle Pups" has the team operating in the Hidden Jungle, a secret jungle area accessible by a cave near a lagoon.
- "Rescue Wheels" has the team riding special monster trucks while contending with the monster truck racing dog Boomer.
- "Air Rescue" has the Pups fly in jets at an airport to save people in the sky.
- "Fire Rescue" features Marshall and others as firefighters for when there's a fire.
- "Search & Rescue" is where the team operate as police officers to find lost things or help with traffic.

== Episodes ==
Season	Segments	Episodes	Originally released	
Season	Segments	Episodes	First released	Last released
1	48	26	August 12, 2013	August 18, 2014
2	48	26	August 13, 2014	December 4, 2015
3	48	26	November 20, 2015	January 26, 2017
4	47	26	February 6, 2017	March 8, 2018
5	47	26	February 6, 2018	January 25, 2019
6	49	26	February 22, 2019	July 23, 2021
7	45	26	March 27, 2020	May 7, 2021
8	53	26	April 2, 2021	April 21, 2023
9	46	26	March 25, 2022	July 31, 2023
10	47	26	July 10, 2023	September 17, 2024
11	46	26	September 18, 2024	August 15, 2025
12	24	13	July 18, 2025	March 5, 2026
13	24	13	March 9, 2026	TBA
14	TBA	13	July 31, 2026	TBA

== Characters ==
=== Paw Patrol ===
The illustrated designs of Ryder, Chase, Marshall, Rubble, Skye, Rocky, Zuma, Everest, Tracker, Cap'n Turbot and Robo-Dog, as of Tracker's introduction

==== Original members ====
- Ryder (voiced by Owen Mason from season 1 to the middle of season 2, Elijha Hammill from the middle of season 3, Jaxon Mercey from the middle of season 4 to the middle of season 6 and Ready Race Rescue, Joey Nijem from late season 6 to the middle of season 7, Beckett Hipkiss from late season 7 to late season 8, Kai Harris from late season 8 to season 12 and Rubble & Crew, Benjamin Sivecic from season 13 onward, Will Brisbin in Paw Patrol: The Movie, Finn Lee-Epp in The Mighty Movie, Henry Bolan in The Dino Movie) is a tech-savvy and gifted 10-year-old boy who is the leader of the Paw Patrol. His main vehicle is an ATV that can transform into a PWC and snowmobile.
- Chase (voiced by Tristan Samuel in season 1, Max Calinescu from season 2 to season 4 and Mighty Pups, Justin Kelly from season 5 to early season 10, Luke Dietz in Rubble & Crew and early season 10 onward, Iain Armitage in Paw Patrol: The Movie, Christian Convery in The Mighty Movie, Rain Janjua in The Dino Movie) is a 7-year-old German Shepherd who serves as a police dog, spy dog, and the second-in-command of the Paw Patrol. His main vehicle is a 4x4 police truck that can transform into a spy truck. In the "Mighty Pups" series, Chase is able to move at superhuman speeds and possesses a powerful bark.
- Marshall (voiced by Gage Munroe in season 1, Drew Davis from season 2 to season 5, Lukas Engel in season 6 and Jet to the Rescue, Kingsley Marshall from late season 6 to season 8 and Paw Patrol: The Movie, Christian Corrao from late season 8 to season 11, Rubble & Crew season 1 and The Mighty Movie, Jesse Gervasi in season 12 onward, Carter Young in The Dino Movie) is a clumsy but competent 6-year-old Dalmatian who serves as a firefighter and paramedic dog. His main vehicle is a fire truck that can transform into an ambulance. In the "Mighty Pups" series, Marshall possesses pyrokinesis and can jump very high.
- Skye (voiced by Kallan Holley from season 1 to season 5 and "Ready Race Rescue", Lilly Bartlam from season 6 onward, Paw Patrol: The Movie and Rubble & Crew, Mckenna Grace in The Mighty Movie and The Dino Movie) is a 7-year-old Cockapoo who serves as the team's air rescue dog. Skye utilizes a glider pack and a helicopter for air travel. In the "Mighty Pups" series, Skye is able to fly unassisted and create whirlwinds.
- Rocky (voiced by Stuart Ralston from season 1 to season 2, Samuel Faraci from season 3 to the middle of season 7, Jackson Reid in late season 7 to season 11 and Rubble & Crew season 2, Matteo Gutierrez in season 12, Billy Quinn in late season 12, Callum Shoniker in Paw Patrol: The Movie and The Mighty Movie, William Desrosiers in The Dino Movie) is a 6-year-old mixed-breed who serves as a recycling and handyman dog. His main vehicle is a recycling truck, which is a cross between a garbage truck and a forklift that can transform into a tugboat. In the "Mighty Pups" series, Rocky is able to create green energy constructs and possesses X-ray vision.
- Rubble (voiced by Devan Cohen from season 1 to season 5, Keegan Hedley from season 6 to the middle of season 8, and Paw Patrol: The Movie, Lucien Duncan-Reid from the middle of season 8 onward and The Dino Movie, Luxton Handspiker in Rubble & Crew and The Mighty Movie) is a 5-year-old Bulldog who serves as a construction dog and a DJ expert. His main vehicle is a tracked bucket loader. In the "Mighty Pups" series, Rubble possesses superhuman strength and a rolling attack.
- Zuma (voiced by Emily Thorne from season 1 to the middle of season 4, Carter Thorne from the middle of season 4 to season 5, Shayle Simons from season 6 to season 8, and Paw Patrol: The Movie, Jordan Mazeral from season 9 onward, Nylan Parthipan in The Mighty Movie and The Dino Movie) is a 5-year-old chocolate Labrador who serves as an aquatic rescue dog. His main vehicle is an amphibious hovercraft equipped with a large clawed arm. In the "Mighty Pups" series, Zuma possesses aquakinesis which he can also use to create solid bubbles.

==== Occasional members ====
- Captain Horatio Turbot (usually identified as Cap'n Turbot; voiced by Ron Pardo) is the Paw Patrol's most frequent caller and a sea captain and marine biologist. His main vehicle is a boat called the Flounder.
- Robo-Dog is a robotic dog introduced in "Pups Save Ryder's Robot." He drives the Paw Patrol's larger vehicles, like the Paw Patroller. Unlike the other dogs, Robo-Dog communicates only in robotic barks, which everyone else appears to understand.
- Everest (voiced by Berkley Silverman) is an 8-year-old purple-hued Siberian Husky who serves as a mountain rescue dog in emergencies relating to snow, ice, or mountains. Her main vehicle is a silver snowcat equipped with a trail-clearing claw. In the "Mighty Pups" series, Everest possesses ice breath.
- Tracker (voiced by David Lopez from season 3 to season 7 and Jet to the Rescue, Mateo Carnovale from season 8 to season 10, River Morales from season 12 onward) is a 4-year-old brown-and-white potcake dog who serves as a jungle rescue dog. His main vehicle is a zebra-themed jeep. Tracker is bilingual, speaking both Spanish and English.
- Tuck (voiced by Eamon Hanson from season 6 to season 7, Roman Pesino from season 9 onward) and Ella (voiced by Isabella Leo) are two Golden Retriever siblings who are known as the Mighty Twins. A meteor gave them superpowers, with Tuck being able to shrink and Ella being able to grow. Their vehicle is a car that splits into two motorcycles.
- Rex (voiced by Luxton Handspiker in season 7, Hartley Bernier in season 9, Austin Farley from season 13 onward, Hayden Chemberlen in The Dino Movie) is a paraplegic Bernese Mountain Dog who uses a high-tech dog wheelchair to get around. He serves as an expert on dinosaurs, where he can understand their language and operates in the Dino Wilds, which is inhabited by dinosaurs. His vehicle is a Stegosaurus-themed off-road vehicle with a ramp for mobility.
- The Cat Pack is a group of cats who use high-tech armor and vehicles modeled after big cats.
  - Wild (formerly known as Wild Cat; voiced by Tristan Mammitzsch from season 7 to season 9 and Hawthorne Wilde Fowler from season 10 onward) is a ginger tabby cat who is the leader of the Cat Pack. By season 9, Wild was revealed to have founded the Cat Pack and has begun using armor that grants him the speed of a cheetah. Wild originally used a motorcycle with retractable gripper claws in its tires, which was later destroyed and replaced with a cheetah-themed motorcycle.
  - Rory (voiced by Tianna SwamiNathan) is a British Shorthair and a member of the Cat Pack. She dislikes sitting still and loves to take cat naps and exercise. Her armor and vehicle are modeled after a white tiger.
  - Shade (voiced by Markeda McKay) is a tuxedo cat and a member of the Cat Pack. Her armor is modeled after a jaguar and she possesses jaguar-like stealth. Her vehicle is a jaguar-themed car with similar abilities.
  - Leo (voiced by Kingston Crooks from season 8 to season 9 and Dean Humphries from season 10 onward) is a tabby cat and a member of the Cat Pack. Like Wild, he is shown to have a fear of mice. His armor is modeled after a lion, and he possesses lion-like strength. His vehicle is a lion-themed off-road vehicle.
- Liberty (voiced by Marsai Martin in Paw Patrol: The Movie and The Mighty Movie, Tymika Tafari from season 9 onward) is a long-haired Dachshund from Adventure City. She was introduced in Paw Patrol: The Movie and later appeared in the main series. Her main vehicle is a scooter. In the "Mighty Pups" series, Liberty has an elastic body.
- Al (voiced by Nylan Parthipan) is a Basset Hound truck driver with trucking experience who was introduced in the Big Truck Pups sub-series. His vehicle is a big truck with two grabber claws.
- Coral (voiced by Kaia Ozdemir) is a Cockapoo and Skye's long-lost cousin. Coral is able to transform into a Mer-pup at will. Her vehicle is a submarine resembling a seahorse which can transform into a motorcycle for land travel.
- Roxi (voiced by Mia SwamiNathan) is a Samoyed with monster trucker experience who was introduced in the Rescue Wheels sub-series. Her vehicle is a monster truck with star-patterned tires.
- "The Crew" are Rubble's cousins, who operate as a construction crew in Builder Cove. They were introduced in the spin-off series Rubble & Crew.
  - Charger (voiced by Alessandro Pugiotto) is an excitable French Bulldog with a prosthetic left hind leg.
  - Motor (voiced by Nova McKay) is a young Ca de Bou with a childish personality and a love of smashing things.
  - Mix (voiced by Shazdeh Kapadia) is an artistic and creative English Bulldog.

=== Supporting characters ===
- Mayor Goodway (voiced by Deann Degruijter from season 1 to early season 7, Kim Roberts from late season 7 onward) is the mayor of Adventure Bay who lives at the City Hall and is one of the Paw Patrol's frequent callers.
  - Chickaletta (voiced by Lora Burke from season 11 onward) is Mayor Goodway's pet chicken. She is a member of the Mini-Patrol.
- Francois Turbot (voiced by Peter Cugno) is Cap'n Turbot's cousin and research partner who lives with him in the Seal Island lighthouse. He works as a zoologist, artist, and nature photographer. He has a thick French accent and often uses French phrases instead of English words.
- Wally is a walrus who lives in the bay. He loves hanging around with Cap'n Turbot and doing tricks for him.
- Danny (voiced by Daniel DeSanto from season 3 to early season 5, Jonathan Malen from late season 5 onward) is a young boy who enjoys attempting dangerous and reckless stunt performances around Adventure Bay, addressing himself as "Daring Danny X".
- Katie (voiced by Katherine Forrester) is a young girl who works at the Adventure Bay pet parlor.
  - Cali (voiced by Julie Lemieux) is Katie's pet ragdoll cat whom she is usually seen with. She is a member of the Mini-Patrol.
- Mr. Porter (voiced by Blair Williams) is the proprietor of Porter's Café in Adventure Bay as well as the grandfather of Alex Porter.
- Alex Porter (voiced by Christian Distefano from season 1 to the middle of season 5, Wyatt White from the middle of season 5 to the middle of season 9, Simon Webster from the middle of season 9 to season 10, Asher Williams from season 11 onward) is a young boy who lives in Adventure Bay and is Mr. Porter's grandson. He is the leader of the Mini-Patrol, a Paw Patrol-inspired group consisting of himself and several pets, which is seldom successful.
- Jake (voiced by Scott McCord from season 1 to season 11, Peter Cugno from late season 12 onward) is a snowboarder from Adventure Bay and the caregiver of Everest.
- Farmer Yumi (voiced by Hiromi Okuyama in season 1, Stephany Seki from season 2 onward) is a farmer in Adventure Bay.
  - Farmer Al (voiced by Ron Pardo) is a farmer, the proprietor of Moo Juice Dairy Farm in Adventure Bay, and the husband of Yumi.
- Carlos (voiced by Lucius Hoyos in season 2, Jaiden Cannatelli from the middle of season 3 to the middle of season 7, Diego Rieger from late season 7 to season 8, Lucas Miranda from season 9 to season 10, Desmond Sivan from season 12 onward) is Ryder's pen pal from the jungle. He is an archaeologist and the caregiver of Tracker.
- The Junior Patrollers are three Pomeranian dogs. They were introduced in Paw Patrol: The Mighty Movie, where they are trained by Liberty and help the Paw Patrol to protect Adventure City. In the "Mighty Pups" series, the Junior Patrollers all gain the ability to duplicate themselves.
  - Nano (voiced by Alan Kim in The Mighty Movie, Eliot Dahan from season 10 onward) is a member of the Junior Patrollers.
  - Mini (voiced by North West in The Mighty Movie, Thandie Quiambao from season 10 onward) is a member of the Junior Patrollers.
  - Tot (voiced by Brice Gonzalez in The Mighty Movie, Desmond Sivan from season 10 onward) is a member of the Junior Patrollers.

=== Villains ===
- Mayor Humdinger (voiced by Ron Pardo) is the mayor of a neighboring town called Foggy Bottom who is the Paw Patrol's greedy, sinister, but incompetent arch-nemesis. He is always coming up with new plans to upstage Adventure Bay which always backfire and tend to have him rescued by the Paw Patrol.
  - The Kitten Catastrophe Crew (also known as the Kit-tastrophe Crew) is a group of unnamed cats who are Mayor Humdinger's helpers and the villainous feline counterparts of the Paw Patrol. They will usually do what they are asked, but sometimes they can be stubborn and disobey Humdinger.
    - "Cat Chase" is a cymric cat who is the counterpart of Chase.
    - "Cat Marshall" is a bicolor cat with white fur and black spots who is the counterpart of Marshall.
    - "Cat Skye" is a Selkirk Rex who is the counterpart of Skye.
    - "Cat Rocky" is a gray and white moggy who is the counterpart of Rocky.
    - "Cat Rubble" (voiced by Chris Rock in The Mighty Movie) is an American Bobtail who is the counterpart of Rubble.
    - "Cat Zuma" is a chocolate-colored Maine Coon who is the counterpart of Zuma.
- Harold Humdinger (voiced by Chance Hurstfield in season 6-7, Etienne Kellici in season 10-present) is the nephew of Mayor Humdinger who appears in the "Mighty Pups" sub-series. When he gets exposed to the meteor fragment, Harold gains technopathic abilities.
- Sweetie (voiced by Anya Cooke) is a poochie that appears in the "Mission Paw" sub-series, the "Rescue Knights" sub-series, and some regular episodes. As the pet of the Princess of Barkingburg, Sweetie wants to steal royal things and become queen. Chase and Skye are her arch-nemesis. On occasion, Sweetie will help the Paw Patrol if they have a common enemy to deal with.
  - Busby is a robotic frog chew toy that works for Sweetie.
- Sid Swashbuckle (voiced by Charles Vandervaart) is a greedy and power-hungry pirate captain.
  - Arrby (voiced by Meeha Contreras in season 4-9 and Jaeren Perez in season 10-present) is A Dachshund who is Sid Swashbuckle's first mate.
- Ladybird (voiced by Bryn McAuley) is a thief who targets shiny items and appears in the "Mighty Pups" sub-series. When she gets exposed to the meteor fragment, Ladybird can fly and possess super-strength.
- The Copycat (voiced by Callum Shoniker) is a cat who gained the combined superpowers of the Paw Patrol and the capability of speech after being exposed to a fragment of the meteor. He appears in the "Mighty Pups" sub-series.
- The Cheetah (voiced by Addison Holley) is a race car driver who is the cousin of Mayor Humdinger. She would use dirty tricks when competing in races.
- The Ruff-Ruff Pack are a trio of mischievous stray dogs that make up their own biker gang. They appear in the "Moto Pups" sub-series.
  - Hubcap (voiced by Julian Crispo in season 7, Kyle Hodgson in season 9-present) is a Boston Terrier who is the leader of the Ruff-Ruff Pack. He is the more reckless member of the group.
  - Dwayne (voiced by Osais Reed in season 7, Levi Dombokah in season 9-present) is a Great Dane and member of the Ruff-Ruff Pack.
  - Gasket (voiced by Madison Abbot) is a female member of the Ruff-Ruff Pack and the more intelligent of the group. She would create inventions to help the Ruff-Ruff Pack which would often backfire as Hubcap would tend to claim her ideas as one of his own.
- The Duke of Flappington (voiced by Ashton Frank) is the first cousin of the Princess of Barkingburg who first appeared in "Jet to the Rescue" and later appeared in the "Rescue Knights" sub-series. He would often conspire to take over Barkingburg.
  - Jean-Claude is the Duke of Flappington's pet golden eagle.
- Claw (voiced by Kit Rakusen) is a Dobermann and former knight of Barkingburg who was ousted from the position for his ambition and attempting to ride a dragon that affected one of the Princess of Barkingburg's parties. He appears in the "Rescue Knights" sub-series where he would collaborate with the Duke of Flappington.
  - Sparks is a red dragon who is Claw's companion.
- Moby (voiced by Ian Ho) is a Mer-pup inventor who gained the ability to transform into a land Portuguese Water Dog at will. He appears in the "Aqua Pups" sub-series.
  - McSquidly is a squid who is Moby's sidekick.
- Boomer (voiced by Jayd Deroché in the TV series, Hudson Brooks in Paw Patrol: Rescue Wheels Championship) is a bullmastiff monster truck driver and a rival of Roxi who appears in the "Rescue Wheels" sub-series. He is known to do monster truck stunts that would put himself and others in danger.
  - Frank is a black-footed ferret who is Boomer's sidekick.

== Production ==
According to Spin Master, the concept for Paw Patrol stemmed from a prototype for a transforming truck toy that Spin Master co-founder Ronnen Harary designed in 2010. Later the same year, the company requested some proposals for a television show based on the transforming toy, and accepted one from Bob the Builder creator Keith Chapman. Chapman sketched early designs of the Paw Patrol team under the working title Raffi & the Rescue Dogs. Spin Master hired toy designers to develop the format further; after the concept was in place, they started designing merchandise.

Chapman's original pitch focused on the idea that the six Paw Patrol dogs were rescued by Ryder before joining the team. Scott Kraft, the show's first writer, and Jamie Whitney, the show's first director, decided to abandon the rescued dog theme in 2012. The name of the series' protagonist, Ryder, was changed multiple times during production; he was originally called Raffi, Roddy, and Robbie before Spin Master settled on Ryder.

Early models of the Paw Patrol pups

According to a 2017 Spin Master interview, "everything pup-related was debated endlessly: names, sizes, ages, breeds". The pups' designs underwent major changes after Chapman's pitch; they were very realistic at first, with unique fur and textures based on their breeds, but they were later simplified and made more cartoonish. Cap'n Turbot's unique design, with his distinctive bead eyes and large nose, was based on the design of Chapman's Bob the Builder character. Ryder's hairstyle was based on Ronnen Harary's hair.

In January 2012, Spin Master began approaching television broadcasters. The company negotiated a broadcast partnership with Nickelodeon, and the network first announced that it had picked up the worldwide broadcast, distribution and merchandise rights (outside of Canada) to Paw Patrol at the 2013 Licensing Expo in Las Vegas, Nevada with Nick also being onboard as a commissioner. The series became Spin Master's first solely-owned intellectual property (IP) once it was released in August 2013.

Since it began production, the show's animation has been provided by Guru Studio. In a 2016 interview with Maclean's Magazine, Guru president Frank Falcone stated that his studio's animators were originally suspicious of the show's "toyetic" concept. The series' rock-inspired original score was composed by the Ontario-based group Voodoo Highway Music & Post. The opening theme song and the ending song used in each episode include vocals performed by Scott Simons.

With each season of the show, new supporting characters and themes are introduced in its episodes. In a May 2016 interview for the Toronto Star, Spin Master president Ben Gadbois stated that his company would continue to introduce additional characters and concepts to increase the franchise's longevity and to expand upon the success of tie-in merchandise. In August of the same year, Ronnen Harary explained that these changes were intended to keep the show's content "fresh" and "relevant".

The show received minor updates to its animation style in the second season and in the eighth season before the eleventh season would completely overhaul the visual style to be more evocative of the theatrical films and Rubble & Crew.

== Release ==
The series has been sold to TV networks in over 160 countries.

In the United States, the series airs on Nickelodeon as well as Nick Jr. Select episodes are available to stream on Netflix and Paramount+. In Canada, the series primarily airs on TVOKids, Knowledge Kids, Télé-Québec, City Saskatchewan, Treehouse, and CBC Kids.

As required for Canadian-American programs aired on federally-funded networks, Paw Patrol has been dubbed in French for Quebec broadcasts and for its broadcast in France on TF1. Canal Panda airs a European Portuguese dub, and it aired on MBC3 in the Middle East. In the United Kingdom, a British English dub was released in November 2013, using the same scripts as the Canadian-American version with minor changes and shown on Channel 5 within its Milkshake! block. and Nick Jr. UK. Also, a Welsh-language dub of the show titled Patrôl Pawennau is shown on S4C as part of its Cyw block. Anione, JEI TV, and KBS have all broadcast the Korean-dubbed version. The show has been aired in the Icelandic language on Iceland's public broadcaster RÚV since 2015. The first two seasons were shown in Finnish on Yle TV2. The video on demand platform Le.com obtained broadcast rights for a Mandarin Chinese-dubbed version of Paw Patrol in April 2016. It aired on MiniMini+ in Poland, e-Junior in the United Arab Emirates, and Clan TVE in Spain. On April 6, 2019, TV Tokyo premiered a Japanese dub of the show, starring Megumi Han as Ryder, who is renamed "Kento" (ケント). In India, the show is dubbed in Hindi and airs on Nick Jr India and ETV Bal Bharat, it's also dubbed in other languages namely Telugu, Tamil, Kannada, Malayalam, Marathi, Gujarati, Odia, Assamese, Punjabi, and Bengali which they all air on ETV Bal Bharat.

== Reception ==
=== Critical reception ===
Critical reception of Paw Patrol has been mixed, with praise for its appeal to young children but significant criticism directed at its themes, character portrayals, and perceived social and political messages. Common Sense Media reviewer Emily Ashby gave the show a four-star rating, stating that "perhaps the show's best attribute is how it demonstrates the value of thoughtful problem-solving". Randy Miller of DVD Talk recommended the show, calling it "packed with all the harmless action and cornball jokes that kids can't help but snicker at". Stuff.co.nz reviewer Pattie Pegler also wrote favourably of the series, but felt that some of the characters "seem rather arbitrary, like Rocky the Recycling Pup". The About Group's Carey Bryson gave the series a mixed review, criticizing its "formulaic" nature but affirming that the "show is not without funny moments".

A research study, commissioned by Sky in March 2016, reported that 16 percent of surveyed British and Irish children named Paw Patrol as their favorite program.

Criticism had been directed toward the show's unequal gender representation because initially the team of dogs was primarily male and included only one female character. Brandy King of the Center on Media and Child Health "found the gender imbalance immediately noticeable" while watching the program. Today's Parent noted in April 2015 that Paw Patrol images appeared frequently on Twitter with the hashtag "#IncludeTheGirls". In response to these criticisms, the writers added an additional female character named Everest, a Siberian Husky and snow rescue dog, starting in season 2.

The show's mobile app game, Paw Patrol: Air and Sea Adventure, was accused of behaving manipulatively towards younger viewers in a 2018 study by the University of Michigan which focused on app-based advertising techniques. Within the game, characters recognizable from the show would express disappointment if players did not purchase items with real money.

In a 2020 paper published in the journal Crime, Media, Culture, Paw Patrol is criticized for sending the message that companies are more capable of providing social services than the state. Author Liam Kennedy argues that the show "encourages complicity in a global capitalist system that (re)produces inequalities and causes environmental harms". Kennedy suggests that Paw Patrol echoes the "core tenets of neoliberalism" by depicting the state and politicians as either unethical or incompetent while the Paw Patrol corporation is entrusted with crimefighting and conservation.

=== Ratings ===
Paw Patrol has received consistently high ratings on Nickelodeon. Viacom CEO Philippe Dauman cited the series as a source of Nickelodeon's 2014 ratings growth. It ranked as the highest-rated, preschool TV program in the United States in November 2013 and held that position throughout the spring 2014 season. The spot was briefly overtaken by Team Umizoomi reruns in July 2016, but Paw Patrol reclaimed the title later the same month. Bloomberg L.P. described Paw Patrol as part of a "creative resurgence" that increased the Nick Jr. channel's viewership in 2016. At Nickelodeon's 2016 upfront presentation for future advertisers, Cyma Zarghami named Paw Patrol one of two preschool shows to have significantly helped boost ratings for the network (the other being Blaze and the Monster Machines).

In March 2015, two back-to-back premieres of the show ranked among the top twenty weekday showings (among total viewers) in Australia. In May 2015, it was reported that Paw Patrol broadcasts on TF1 had been viewed by 45 per cent of households in France with preschool-aged children.

=== Cultural impact and legacy ===
The show has received recognition from public figures and celebrities. Former Canadian Prime Minister Justin Trudeau and his children are fans of the show; Trudeau mentioned the characters by name in a 2017 speech. After performing at the Super Bowl LII halftime show, Justin Timberlake filmed a segment for The Tonight Show Starring Jimmy Fallon in which he named Chase as his favorite Paw Patrol character and held a Chase plush toy. During his opening monologue for the 90th Academy Awards, host Jimmy Kimmel joked that Timothée Chalamet was missing Paw Patrol to attend the ceremony, but "Ryder and his team of pups saved the day, so".

The show was satirized by The Onion in a 2018 parody article; referencing police brutality in the United States, the article claimed that the show's writers defended police dog, Chase, for shooting an unarmed black lab.

In the wake of the George Floyd protests, the show was criticized for presenting a "good-cop archetype" after a post appeared on the show's Twitter account announcing that they would go dark in memory of Floyd received negative backlash. In July 2020, White House Press Secretary Kayleigh McEnany claimed the show was canceled due to "cancel culture" but the show denied any such termination.

From September 2022 to September 2023, the show was prominently featured in a special exhibit by the Canadian Museum of History titled From Pepinot to Paw Patrol – Television of Our Childhood, which showcased items and displays from the last 70 years of Canadian children's television.

=== Awards and nominations ===
In 2014, the series' theme song was nominated for Outstanding Original Song – Main Title and Promo in the 41st Daytime Creative Arts Emmy Awards. In 2016, the season two episode "Pups Save a Mer-Pup" was nominated for Best Animated Television/Broadcast Production for Preschool Children in the 43rd Annie Awards. As of 2025, Paw Patrol has received thirty three Canadian Screen Award nominations with twenty seven wins.

Year	Award	Category	Nominee	Result	Ref.
2014	41st Daytime Creative Arts Emmy Awards	Outstanding Original Song – Main Title and Promo	Scott Krippayne; Smidi Smith	Nominated	
2014	Parents' Choice Foundation	"Fun Stuff" Award	Spin Master	Won	
2014	Environmental Media Awards	Environmental Media Award in Children's Television	Spin Master	Won	
2015	Toy of the Year Awards	Property of the Year, 2015	Spin Master	Nominated	
2015	Toy of the Year Awards	Preschool Toy of the Year, 2015	Spin Master	Nominated	
2016	Toy of the Year Awards	Property of the Year, 2016	Spin Master	Nominated	
2016	43rd Annie Awards	Best Animated Television/Broadcast Production for Preschool Children	"Pups Save a MerPup"	Nominated	
2016	4th Canadian Screen Awards	Best Pre-School Program or Series	Spin Master	Nominated	
2016	4th Canadian Screen Awards	Best Direction in an Animated Program or Series	Jamie Whitney (for "Pups Save a Talent Show/Pups Save the Corn Roast")	Won	
2016	Licensing.biz People Awards	Licensee Team of the Year	Spin Master	Won	
2016	Australian Toy Association	Preschool License of the Year	Spin Master	Won	
2016	Canadian Cinema Editors Awards	Best Editing in Animation	Tom Berger (for "Pups Save A Big Bone")	Nominated	
2016	SOCAN Awards	International TV Series Music Award	Voodoo Highway Music & Post	Won	
2017	5th Canadian Screen Awards	Best Pre-School Program or Series	Spin Master	Won	
2017	5th Canadian Screen Awards	Best Direction in an Animated Program or Series	Jamie Whitney (for "Pups Save Friendship Day")	Won	
2018	6th Canadian Screen Awards	Best Pre-School Program or Series	Spin Master	Won	
2018	6th Canadian Screen Awards	Best Direction in an Animated Program or Series	Charles E. Bastien (for "Mission PAW: Quest for the Crown")	Won	
2018	6th Canadian Screen Awards	Best Sound in an Animated Program or Series	Richard Spence-Thomas, Tim Muirhead, Kyle Peters, Patton Rodrigues and Ryan Ongaro (for "Mission PAW: Quest for the Crown")	Won	
2019	7th Canadian Screen Awards	Animated Program or Series	Spin Master	Won	
2019	7th Canadian Screen Awards	Sound in an Animated Program or Series	Richard Spence-Thomas, Tim Muirhead, Patton Rodrigues, Ryan Ongaro and Kyle Peters (for "Ultimate Rescue: Pups Save the Royal Kitties")	Won	
2019	7th Canadian Screen Awards	Music, Animation	James Chapple, Graeme Cornies, David Kelly and Brian Pickett (for "Ultimate Rescue: Pups Save the Royal Kitties")	Won	
2019	46th Daytime Emmy Awards	Outstanding Special Class Animated Program	Mighty Pups	Nominated	
2019	46th Daytime Emmy Awards	Outstanding Sound Mixing for a Preschool Animated Program	Mighty Pups	Nominated	
2020	8th Canadian Screen Awards	Pre-School Program or Series	Spin Master	Won	
2020	8th Canadian Screen Awards	Sound, Animation	Richard Spence-Thomas, Kyle Peters, Patton Rodrigues, Ryan Ongaro, Tim Muirhead, Mitch Connors and Luke Dante (for "Mighty Pups Super Paws: When Super Kitties Attack")	Won	
2020	8th Canadian Screen Awards	Original Music, Animation	Brian Pickett, Graeme Cornies, James Chapple and David Kelly (for "Mighty Pups Super Paws: When Super Kitties Attack")	Won	
2020	8th Canadian Screen Awards	Direction, Animation	Charles E. Bastien (for "Mighty Pups Super Paws: When Super Kitties Attack")	Won	
2021	9th Canadian Screen Awards	Pre-School Program or Series	Spin Master	Won	
2021	9th Canadian Screen Awards	Sound in an Animated Program or Series	Richard Spence-Thomas, Kyle Peters, Patton Rodrigues, Ryan Ongaro, Timothy Muirhead, Mitch Connors and Luke Dante (for "Dino Rescue: Pups and the Lost Dino Eggs")	Won	
2021	9th Canadian Screen Awards	Directing, Animated Program or Series	Charles E. Bastien (for "Dino Rescue: Pups and the Lost Dino Eggs")	Nominated	
2021	9th Canadian Screen Awards	Performance in an Animated Program or Series	Lilly Bartlam	Nominated	
2022	10th Canadian Screen Awards	Pre-School Program or Series	Spin Master	Won	
2022	10th Canadian Screen Awards	Sound in an Animated Program or Series	Richard Spence-Thomas, Timothy Muirhead, Mitch Connors, Luke Dante, Kyle Peters, Ryan Ongaro and Patton Rodrigue (for "Moto Pups: Pups vs the Ruff-Ruff Pack")	Won	
2022	10th Canadian Screen Awards	Directing, Animated Program or Series	Charles E. Bastien (for "Moto Pups: Pups vs the Ruff-Ruff Pack")	Nominated	
2022	10th Canadian Screen Awards	Writing, Animated Program or Series	Andy Guerdat and Steve Sullivan (for "Moto Pups: Pups vs the Ruff-Ruff Pack")	Nominated	
2023	11th Canadian Screen Awards	Pre-School Program or Series	Spin Master	Won	
2023	11th Canadian Screen Awards	Sound in an Animated Program or Series	Tim Muirhead, Mitch Connors, Luke Dante, Kyle Peters, Ryan Ongaro and Patton Rodrigues (for "Rescue Knights: Quest for the Dragon's Tooth")	Won	
2023	11th Canadian Screen Awards	Directing, Animation	Charles E. Bastien (for "Rescue Knights: Quest for the Dragon's Tooth")	Won	
2024	12th Canadian Screen Awards	Pre-School Program or Series	Spin Master	Won	
2024	12th Canadian Screen Awards	Performance in an Animated Program or Series	Jayne Eastwood	Won	
2024	12th Canadian Screen Awards	Sound in an Animated Program or Series	Richard Spence-Thomas, Tim Muirhead, Luke Dante, Katie Pagacz, Kyle Peters, Ryan Ongaro, Patton Rodrigues and Mitch Conners (for "Aqua Pups: Pups Save a Floating Castle")	Won	
2024	12th Canadian Screen Awards	Writing, Animated Program or Series	Louise Moon (for "All Paws on Deck")	Won	
2025	13th Canadian Screen Awards	Pre-School Program or Series	Spin Master	Won	
2025	13th Canadian Screen Awards	Voice performance	Ron Pardo	Nominated	
2025	13th Canadian Screen Awards	Sound in an animated program or series	Richard Spence-Thomas, Tim Muirhead, Anita Yung, Madelyn Southward, Kyle Peters, Katie Pagacz, Bethany Masters, Patton Rodrigues and Mitch Connors (for "Rescue Wheels: Pups Save Adventure Bay!")	Won	
2025	13th Canadian Screen Awards	Best Original Music, Animation	Graeme Cornies, Brian Pickett and James Chapple (for "Rescue Wheels: Pups Save Adventure Bay!")	Won	

== Films ==
In November 2017, Ronnen Harary confirmed that Spin Master was "currently considering whether to extend the Paw Patrol franchise into feature films at some point in the next 12 to 24 months". Animation tests were conducted in 2017 to measure how the characters "would translate onto the big screen" and the company developed a film script.

On May 9, 2019, it was confirmed during Spin Master's First Quarter 2019 Earnings Conference Call that an animated theatrical film based on the series, titled Paw Patrol: The Movie was in the works with an August 2021 release date. On November 8, 2019, it was announced that Mikros Image in Montreal would handle the animation. Development of the film was confirmed on February 21, 2020, with Cal Brunker attached as director. Spin Master Entertainment produced the movie with an association in both Nickelodeon Movies and Paramount Pictures. On April 24, 2020, the release date was announced to be August 20, 2021.

A first look at the film was shown on Nickelodeon Kids' Choice Awards 2021 on March 13, 2021.

It was announced on November 3, 2021, that a sequel, titled Paw Patrol: The Mighty Movie, was in production and was released on September 29, 2023.

On September 26, 2023, it was announced that a third film is in development, later titled Paw Patrol: The Dino Movie, which was released on August 14, 2026.

=== Box office performance ===
Film	Release date	Box office gross			Ref(s)
Film	Release date	U.S. and Canada	Other territories	Worldwide	Ref(s)
Paw Patrol	December 22, 2016		$303,032	$303,032	
Mission Big Screen	July 7, 2017		$54,731	$54,731	
Sea Patrol	February 1, 2018		$389,945	$389,945	
Mighty Pups	October 4, 2018		$8,373,241	$8,373,241	
Ready, Race, Rescue!	October 3, 2019		$15,193,000	$15,193,000	
Jet to the Rescue	September 10, 2020		$1,695,576	$1,695,576	
Charged Up	July 17, 2020		$43,367	$43,367	
Paw Patrol: The Movie	August 20, 2021	$40,127,371	$104,200,000	$144,327,371	
Paw Patrol: The Mighty Movie	September 29, 2023	$65,231,360	$137,000,000	$202,231,360	
A Paw Patrol Christmas	October 30, 2025		$10,555,462	$10,555,462	
Paw Patrol: The Dino Movie	August 14, 2026	$52,447,322	$99,100,000	$151,547,322	
Total		$157,896,053	$376,908,354	$534,714,407	

=== TV special ===
On September 17, 2025, Nickelodeon announced that a Paw Patrol Christmas special would air on CBS and on Paramount+ on Friday, November 28, 2025. The special would also air in theaters in the United Kingdom.

This would be the first time in 19 years where a Nick Jr. show would air on CBS since September 2006, when Nick Jr. on CBS ended.

== Other media ==
=== Video games ===
In February 2018, a video game based on the series, titled Paw Patrol: On a Roll was announced. Developed by Torus Games and published by Outright Games, it was released for PlayStation 4, Xbox One, Nintendo Switch, and Microsoft Windows on October 23, 2018. Another video game, titled Paw Patrol Mighty Pups: Save Adventure Bay, was announced on July 17, 2020. Developed by Drakhar Studio and also published by Outright Games, it was released for PlayStation 4, Xbox One, Nintendo Switch, Stadia, and Microsoft Windows on November 6, 2020. Another video game for the film, titled PAW Patrol The Movie: Adventure City Calls was announced on June 10, 2021. Developed by Drakhar Studio and also published by Outright Games, it was released for PlayStation 4, Xbox One, Nintendo Switch, Stadia, and Microsoft Windows on August 13, 2021. It was announced in May 2022 that Outright Games is releasing a racing game for the series titled Paw Patrol: Grand Prix. Developed by 3D Clouds and was released for PlayStation 4, PlayStation 5, Xbox One, Xbox Series X/S, Nintendo Switch, Google Stadia, and Microsoft Windows on September 30, 2022. A DLC for Grand Prix titled Race in Barkingburg was released on December 2, 2022. A new DLC added a battle arena mode title Pup Treat Arena was released on March 10, 2023. In June 2023, it was announced that a new game titled Paw Patrol World which was released on September 29, 2023. It is being developed by 3D Clouds and is released for PlayStation 4, PlayStation 5, Xbox One, Xbox Series X/S, Nintendo Switch, and Microsoft Windows. A mobile game named Paw Patrol Academy was officially made and released in late 2023. The co-founder describes the game as the franchise's "first educational app". As of November 2023, it is one of the top 5 apps for kids 5 and under in the app store. Paw Patrol Academy has been awarded Google Play's Best of 2023 App for Families. The app has also been nominated for Kidscreen's Best Branded Learning App. In June 2025, It was announced that a new racing game is set to be released titled, PAW Patrol Rescue Wheels: Championship. Developed by 3D Clouds and is set to be released for PlayStation 4, PlayStation 5, Xbox One, Xbox Series X/S and Nintendo Switch on October 31, 2025.

=== Live events ===
In April 2016, a stage show titled Paw Patrol Live: Race to the Rescue was announced. The show features the Paw Patrol characters competing in a race. It toured in Canada, the United States, Mexico, New Zealand, Australia and the Philippines.

A sequel show, titled Paw Patrol Live: The Great Pirate Adventure, was announced in June 2017. It follows the Paw Patrol as they rescue Cap'n Turbot from a cavern, and it will tour the same countries as its predecessor. The shows are produced by VStar Entertainment Group, which is best known for producing the popular Sesame Street Live touring shows for 37 years.

Mascots based on the Paw Patrol characters have appeared at events across Canada, the United States, and the United Kingdom. They joined an "Etch A Sketch Day" celebration at Spin Master's office in Toronto on July 26, 2016. The characters, along with replicas of the Lookout tower from the program, were included as part of the Nick Jr. Play Date Tour in autumn 2015. Marshall and Chase made appearances at shopping malls throughout Nottingham, Suffolk, and Somerset in the U.K. in the summer of 2016. Multiple meet-and-greet events attracted far more attendees than expected, with some reaching over 5,000 visitors. They appeared for the first time in Northern Ireland at Glenarm Castle on July 13, 2016. They are scheduled to appear regularly in a Nickelodeon-themed area of the Thurrock's Lakeside Shopping Centre located on the outskirts of London, England.

Like many children's properties, unauthorized productions and events using copyright infringing costumes featuring the show's characters have attracted the attention of Spin Master and Nickelodeon. In February 2016, several Greene King pubs in the U.K. scheduled breakfast events with costumed characters modelled after the pups. Nickelodeon forced the chain to stop every event by threatening a lawsuit if they went ahead. There was some consumer backlash as a result, but the events were not held.

=== Rubble spin-off series ===
On November 3, 2021, Nickelodeon and Spin Master stated that an untitled spin-off series focusing on one of the main six pups was in development, and was set to premiere in 2023. On March 24, 2022, it was announced that the spin-off series would focus on Rubble. In November 2022, the series' title was revealed to be Rubble & Crew. Rather than Guru Studio, the spinoff is animated by Jam Filled Entertainment and premiered on February 3, 2023. Characters from the spinoff also occasionally appear in the main series and vice versa.

=== Skye spin-off series ===
On November 10, 2026, another spin-off Skye's Pup Squad was announced, scheduled for a March 2027 release. It would be animated in 2D, with Leah Gotcsik serving as showrunner. Animation services will be done by Jam Filled Entertainment.

== Merchandise ==
A set of Paw Patrol figures

On May 18, 2014, Spin Master introduced a toy line based on the television series at Toys "R" Us locations across Canada. The line was not distributed to international markets until June 22 of the same year. Dion Vlachos was in charge of the U.S. product launch.

Paw Patrol has since become one of Spin Master's most profitable brands. Analysts for the National Bank of Canada reported that toys and games based on the show accounted for approximately $245 million U.S. (or 25 percent) of Spin Master's gross product sales for 2015. Spin Master chairman Anton Rabie noted in August 2016 that the "continuing strength" of Paw Patrol toys, in addition to new acquisitions and movie licenses, made up 40.5 per cent of the firm's second-quarter revenue. Marketing manager Emma Eden said that the toys were responsible for increasing the company's presence in the preschool market. Throughout 2016, Spin Master's revenue grew more in this market than in any other toy category. Paw Patrol has been cited as the sole reason for this.

The NPD Group named Paw Patrol the top new toy brand of 2015 in the United Kingdom. The group also reported that it was the best-selling preschool license in France in the first quarter of 2015. Dave Brandon, the chief executive officer of Toys "R" Us, listed the Paw Patroller vehicle toy as one of the 2015 holiday season's "hottest" items. Argos the U.K. catalogue retailer included the Paw Patrol Air Patroller vehicle on its list of the toys it predicts will be bestsellers during the Christmas 2016 season. In 2018, it was estimated that total retail sales to date were approximately US$7 billion.
