= Paw Patrol: Grand Prix =

2022 video game

PAW Patrol: Grand Prix
- Developer: 3DClouds
- Publisher: Outright Games
- Series: Paw Patrol
- Platforms: Microsoft Windows; Nintendo Switch; PlayStation 4 PlayStation 5 Stadia; Xbox One; Xbox Series X/S
- Release: September 30, 2022
- Genre: Racing
- Modes: Single-player, multiplayer

Paw Patrol: Grand Prix is a kart racing video game developed by 3DClouds and published by Outright Games. It is based on the children's television series Paw Patrol, and was released on September 30, 2022, for Microsoft Windows, Nintendo Switch, PlayStation 4, PlayStation 5, Stadia, Xbox One and Xbox Series X/S. Its racing gameplay is similar to Mario Kart and Crash Team Racing.

== Gameplay ==
The gameplay consists of single or multiplayer battling and racing on different tracks in Adventure Bay, The Jungle, Jake's Snowboarding Resort, and Barkingburg. The game's playable characters includes Ryder, Marshall, Rubble, Chase, Rocky, Zuma, Skye, Everest, Tracker, and Rex. It also includes auto-acceleration for easier racing and a harder mode for experienced players.

== Development and release ==
The game was announced in May 2022 and was released on September 30, 2022. Downloadable content titled Race in Barkingburg was released on December 2, 2022. Pup Treat Arena added a battle arena mode and released on March 10, 2023. A Complete Edition was released on March 8, 2024, which has the complete game with the 2 DLC included.
