= Paw Patrol: On a Roll =

2018 video game

PAW Patrol: On a Roll
- Developer(s): Torus Games
- Publisher(s): Outright Games
- Series: Paw Patrol
- Engine: Unity
- Platform(s): Microsoft Windows; Xbox One; PlayStation 4 Nintendo Switch
- Release: October 23, 2018
- Genre(s): Platformer
- Mode(s): Single-player

Paw Patrol: On a Roll is a video game developed by Australian studio Torus Games and published by English studio Outright Games. It is based on the children's television series Paw Patrol and was released on October 23, 2018, for Microsoft Windows, Xbox One, PlayStation 4, and Nintendo Switch.

== Gameplay ==
Paw Patrol: On a Roll is a side-scrolling video game in which players assist the PAW Patrol by acquiring dog treats and helping animals. Animals are helped by approaching them on the opposite side of the screen.

== Development ==
When Paw Patrol: On a Roll was first announced, a Nintendo 3DS version was listed alongside the other platforms; however, it was not mentioned in later trailers or promotional material. A month before launch, Outright Games stated that the 3DS version had been postponed indefinitely due to "transfer issues." At some point in the following years, the port was quietly canceled.

In 2021, Outright Games indirectly referenced the 3DS port when asked about it and revealed that all of their development resources had been moved to the Nintendo Switch. In 2024 when asked again, they cited the shutdown of Nintendo Network as a contributing factor of the ports' cancellation, even though the game had no online features and the service ended six years after the initial delay.

== Reception ==
Rock Paper Shotgun called it "grimly perfunctory and dreadful".
