= Daniel Tiger's Neighborhood =

American-Canadian children's animated preschool television series

- Also known as: Daniel Tiger's Neighbourhood (in Commonwealth spelling)
- Genre: Children's television series; Musical; Comedy; Preschool; Educational
- Created by: Angela C. Santomero
- Based on: Mister Rogers' Neighborhood and the work of Fred Rogers
- Written by: Angela C. Santomero
- Voices of: See § Characters
- Theme music composer: Fred Rogers; David Kelly; James Chapple; Brian Pickett; Graeme Cornies
- Opening theme: "Daniel Tiger's Neighborhood Theme (Won't You Be My Neighbor)"
- Ending theme: "It's Such a Good Feeling" (closing song, interstitials) "It's You I Like" (instrumental version, closing credits)
- Countries of origin: United States; Canada
- Original language: English
- No. of seasons: 8
- No. of episodes: 160 (list of episodes)

Production
- Executive producers: Angela C. Santomero; Kevin Morrison (seasons 1–4); Ellen Doherty (seasons 5–present); Vince Commisso
- Production locations: Pittsburgh, Pennsylvania (live-action sequences); Toronto, Ontario; New York City; London
- Camera setup: Animated
- Running time: 22–28 minutes (full episode); 11 minutes (single episode); 20 minutes ("Won't You Sing Along with Me?" only); 44–51 minutes (special episodes)
- Production companies: 9 Story USA (Note: Credited as Out of the Blue Enterprises until season 5.); 9 Story Media Group; Fred Rogers Productions

Original release
- Network: PBS Kids (United States); CBC Kids (Canada)
- Release: September 3, 2012 – present

Related
- Mister Rogers' Neighborhood; Donkey Hodie

Daniel Tiger's Neighborhood (also spelt as Daniel Tiger's Neighbourhood in select countries) is a animated educational musical television series. It was created by Angela C. Santomero (who also created Blue's Clues and Super Why!) and produced by Fred Rogers Productions, 9 Story Media Group, and 9 Story USA (formerly Out of the Blue Enterprises). The series debuted on September 3, 2012, on PBS Kids. It is based on the Neighborhood of Make-Believe from Mister Rogers, the family-oriented television series created and hosted by Fred Rogers that aired from 1968 to 2001.

== Premise ==
The character Daniel Tiger is based on Fred Rogers, and elements of his home are based on the set of Mister Rogers' Neighborhood.

The series is about Daniel Tiger, a shy but curious Tiger who learns about the world around him. His parents are Mom Tiger, a carpenter and Dad Tiger, who works at the Clock Factory.

It also features other children of the characters from the Neighborhood of Make-Believe, such as Katerina Kittycat (daughter of Henrietta Pussycat), Miss Elaina (daughter of Lady Elaine Fairchilde and Music Man Stan), O the Owl (nephew of X the Owl), Prince Wednesday (King Friday XIII and Queen Sara Saturday's youngest son and Prince Tuesday's little brother), and Jodi Platypus. Daniel and his friends interact with the viewer, (calling the viewer "neighbor") and breaks the fourth wall to ask questions related to the content in the episodes.

Two 11-minute segments are linked by a common socio-emotional theme, such as disappointment, sadness, anger, or thankfulness. Each theme also uses a musical motif phrase, which the show calls "strategy songs", to reinforce the theme and help children remember the life lessons. Many of the "strategy songs" are available in albums or as singles under the artist name "Daniel Tiger's Neighborhood". It also featured live-action segments in-between the animated series featured children either going through their daily life or visiting a place akin to the episode.

The program is targeted at preschool-aged children; it teaches emotional intelligence, kindness, and human respect. Its content follows a curriculum based on Fred Rogers' teaching and new research into child development.

== Episodes ==
Season	Episodes	Originally aired	
Season	Episodes	First aired	Last aired
1	40	September 3, 2012	February 21, 2014
2	20	August 18, 2014	July 4, 2016
3	25	September 5, 2016	July 10, 2018
4	18	July 11, 2018	January 10, 2020
5	20	August 17, 2020	May 18, 2022
6	18	September 5, 2022	May 8, 2024
7	15	August 12, 2024	January 27, 2026
8	TBA	June 29, 2026	TBA

== Characters ==
Daniel Tiger's Neighborhood characters include Daniel, his little sister Margaret and their parents Mom and Dad Tiger. Teacher Harriet is his kindergarten teacher and his classmates are Miss Elaina, Jodi Platypus, O the Owl, Katerina Kittycat, and Prince Wednesday. They ride Trolley, a semi-sentient trolley like the one seen in the original Mister Rogers.

=== Tiger family ===
- Daniel Tiger (voiced by Jake Beale from season 1–early season 3, Devan Cohen from late season 2–season 3, Keegan Hedley in seasons 4–5, Asher Bolduc-Theron in season 6 and Rain Janjua in seasons 7–present) is a 4-year-old anthropomorphic tiger cub who lives on Jungle Beach with his parents. His favorite toy is a blue stuffed tiger named Tigey, which he named after "Tigey the Adventure Tiger", his favorite storybook hero. He is allergic to peaches, as revealed in the episode, "Daniel's Allergy; Allergies at School." Daniel breaks the fourth wall to ask questions related to the episode, and also invited viewers to make-believe with him. His catchphrases are "Grr-ific!" "Tiger-tastic!" "Ugga Mugga" and "Wasn't that Grr-ific?" He has been the mascot of Fred Rogers Productions since 2018.
- Margaret Tiger (voiced by Kira Gelineau in seasons 2–3, Bryn McAuley in seasons 4–present) is Daniel's 1-year-old little sister who was introduced in season 2. Her favorite toy is Pandy, a stuffed panda. She is named after Daniel's favorite baby book, "Margaret's Music", and her great-grandmother with the same name. Margaret loves playing with her brother and calls her "Dan-Dan" all the time.
- Mom Tiger (voiced by Heather Bambrick) is Daniel's mother, who works as a carpenter as of the first episode of season 4, "Daniel Finds Something to Do". In Mister Rogers' Neighborhood, there was a "Collette Tiger" who referred to her grandfather as "grandpere" (as Daniel does to his).
- Dad Tiger (voiced by Ted Dykstra) is Daniel's father, who is a photographer and also works at the clock factory, where he maintains different clocks and is responsible for "chime time". He is loosely based upon the Daniel Striped Tiger puppet from Mister Rogers' Neighborhood, a very shy orphan who lived inside a non-functioning grandfather clock.
- Grandpere Tiger (voiced by François Klanfer) is Daniel's paternal French-accented grandfather (grandpere being French for "grandfather") who travels in his sailboat. In the episode, "Margaret's Birthday Buddy; Margaret's Birthday Party," he reveals his age is 67.

=== Owl family ===
- O the Owl (voiced by Zachary Bloch in early season 1, Stuart Ralston from mid-season 1–early season 3, Parker Lauzon in late season 3, Benjamin Hum from season 4–early season 6, Ian Ho in late season 6 and Remy Smith in seasons 7–present) is an anthropomorphic blue owl who lives with his Uncle X. His catchphrases are "Hoo hoo!" and "Nifty galifty!" He loves reading books and has a book-shaped lunchbox.
- X the Owl (voiced by Tony Daniels) is O's uncle whose feathers are still the same dark blue color as they were in Mister Rogers' Neighborhood. He works at the neighborhood library, and his catchphrases are "How in the world are you?" and "Nifty galifty!"

=== Cat family ===
- Katerina Kittycat (voiced by Amariah Faulkner from seasons 1–3, Jenna Weir in seasons 4–5, Maya Misaljevic in seasons 6–7 and Charlie Storey in season 8) is an anthropomorphic kitten who loves dance and music. She is O's next-door neighbor and one of Daniel's closest friends. Katerina loves playing ballet, doing twirls, playing dress-up, and making art. Her catchphrase is "Meow-meow!", and her favorite toy is Penelope Pig.
- Henrietta Pussycat (voiced by Teresa Pavlinek) is Katerina's mother. She is a supporting character who shares her love of dancing with her daughter.

=== Royal family ===
- Prince Wednesday (voiced by Nicholas Kaegi in season 1, Jaxon Mercey in seasons 2–4, Callum Shoniker in seasons 5–6 and Luke Dietz in seasons 7–present) is the Royal Family's youngest son who lives in the Castle. He is one of Daniel's classmates and his best friend, has a rock collection and often pretends to be different animals. He frequently uses the adjective "royal" to refer to objects in his possession and says "Boop-she-boop-she-boo!" when he is happy. His stuffed animals are Mr. Lizard, Sir Jumpy Frog, Bananas Monkey, and Polly Wolly Parrot.
- King Friday XIII (voiced by Jamie Watson) is the Ruler of the Neighborhood of Make-Believe, married to Queen Saturday, has two sons—Prince Tuesday and Prince Wednesday—and is Chrissie's uncle. His arrival is often preceded by trumpet fanfare, and he makes all the public announcements in the neighborhood. He enjoys bowling in his spare time, one of the rare instances he does not wear royal garb. He usually greets others with "Royal Greetings, royal greetings." He is a 2D animated model while his puppet model is voiced by Matt Vogel for Donkey Hodie.
- Queen Sara Saturday (voiced by Catherine Disher) is King Friday's wife, Prince Tuesday's and Prince Wednesday's mother and Chrissie's aunt. She is a supporting character, not seen as often as the other members of the royal family.
- Prince Tuesday (voiced by Tommy Lioutas) is Prince Wednesday's older brother, King Friday's heir apparent and Daniel Tiger's babysitter. He also works at the neighborhood restaurant as a waiter, at the market as a grocery clerk, a crossing guard near the school, as a lifeguard at the neighborhood pool and cleans Trolley. He went to college in the episode 'Prince Tuesday Goes to College'. However, he's back for a visit in the episode 'Prince Tuesday Visits'. Later, Prince Tuesday starts to write comics and show them to her brother and niece.
- Chrissie (voiced by Matilda Gilbert) is Prince Tuesday and Wednesday's cousin and King Friday and Queen Sara's niece. Her legs cannot work on their own, so she has to use braces on her legs and crutches on her arms. She has a horse named Peaches. Also, she attends the neighborhood school. As a part of the Royal family, she would be princess of the family. She was introduced in 'Daniel's New Friend'. Chrissie is based on Chrissy Thompson, a regular visitor on Mister Rogers' Neighborhood.

=== Museum-Go-Round family ===
- Miss Elaina (voiced by Addison Holley from seasons 1–4, Markeda McKay from seasons 5–7 and Nova McKay in seasons 8–present) is a silly and playful girl with afro puffs who enjoys doing things backwards. She lives with her parents, Lady Elaine and Music Man Stan, in the Museum-Go-Round. She is one of Daniel's five classmates and often imagines space travel and robots. Her favorite toy is "Astrid the Astronaut", and her catchphrase is "Hiya, toots!"
- Music Man Stan (voiced by Jeremiah Sparks) is Miss Elaina's father who owns the Neighborhood Music Shop, one of Daniel's favorite places to visit. He is also a firefighter with Dr. Anna and is in the musical duo "Bread and Jam" with Baker Aker. Music Man Stan is based on the actor Stanley Bennett Clay and his character he played on Christmastime with Mr. Rogers called The Music Man.
- Lady Elaine (voiced by Teresa Pavlinek) is Miss Elaina's mother who works at the crayon factory and is a curator of the Museum-Go-Round.

=== Platypus family ===
- Jodi Platypus (voiced by Laaibah Alvi in seasons 4–7 and Eva Amuno in season 8) is a 3-year-old (later 4-year-old) anthropomorphic platypus who is very shy around new acquaintances, but can be silly once she gets comfortable. She loves to play hide and seek and is resourceful, with a well-stocked pocket of supplies. Her catchphrases are "Yippee Skippy!" and "Neat-o!". Her favorite toy is Benji, a stuffed hedgehog. Jodi also has asthma.
- Dr. Platypus (voiced by Miku Graham) is a mother to Jodi, Leo, and Teddy, and the daughter of Nana Platypus. Sometimes, she calls her daughter Jodi Jojo Bean. She works as the new neighborhood dentist.
- Teddy Platypus (voiced by Bryn McAuley) is a 2-year-old twin to Leo and one of Jodi's younger brothers who is fast, rambunctious and loves to play hide and seek.
- Leo Platypus (voiced by Milo Torriel-Gibbon) is a 2-year-old twin to Teddy and one of Jodi's younger brothers who is very careful and shy, but loves to cheer on his family.
- Nana Platypus (voiced by Elizabeth Hanna) is Jodi's grandmother who lives with her grandchildren Jodi, Teddy and Leo and works as a hairdresser.
- Mr. Platypus (voiced by Adam Langton) is Jodi's father who lives in a cabin away from the neighborhood. He loves building things, and even built a playground for Teddy, Leo and Jodi to play with.

=== Teacher Harriet's family ===
- Teacher Harriet (voiced by Shawne Jackson) is Daniel's preschool teacher. Her class consists of seven students: Daniel Tiger, Miss Elaina, Prince Wednesday, Princess Chrissie, O the Owl, Katerina Kittycat and Jodi Platypus. Teacher Harriet might be based on the Mister Rogers character Harriet Elizabeth Cow from the Neighborhood of Make-Believe, who appears in Donkey Hodie, another spin-off.
- Max (voiced by Israel Thomas-Bruce in season 5, Isaiah Paul-Allen in season 6, and Noah Van Berkum in season 7) is Teacher Harriet's autistic nephew. Being autistic, Max needs time before he's ready to make new friends, and he doesn't like loud noises. He loves all things buses and bugs. His mother is Anne, and his father is Jacob.
- Amira (also known as Amia; voiced by Mikaela Blake) is the niece of Teacher Harriet and Max's older sister. Her mother is Anne, and her father is Jacob.

=== Juan Carlos's family ===
- Juan Carlos (voiced by Desmond Sivan) is Daniel's Latino pen pal, who lives in another neighborhood. Daniel visits his neighborhood in the special "Daniel Visits a New Neighborhood," and Juan Carlos visits Daniel's Neighborhood in the episode, "Juan Carlos Visits the Neighborhood; Daniel Shows Juan Carlos the Clock Factory."
- Valentina (voiced by Humberley Gonzalez) is Mom Tiger's friend and Juan Carlos' mother.
- Felipe (voiced by Keram Malicki Sanchez) is Juan Carlos's father.

=== Other neighbors ===
- Baker Aker (voiced by Jon Filici in season 1 to early season 2, and Carlos Diaz in seasons 2–present) owns and runs the neighborhood bakery. He is Cuban, as he says in a 2016 segment called "A Visit with Baker Aker". He has baked pastries for Daniel and his family on many occasions and plays with Music Man Stan in Bread & Jam. He is based on the Mister Rogers character Chef Brockett and his name is an homage to Neighbor Aber, Charles R. Aber, of Mister Rogers' Neighborhood. He marries Dr. Anna in the episode 'The Neighborhood Wedding'.
- Mr. McFeely (voiced by Derek McGrath) is the neighborhood mailman who is often on his bicycle delivering parcels and arrives and departs by saying "Speedy delivery!" He is the only human character from Mister Rogers' Neighborhood to be brought to Daniel Tiger's Neighborhood.
- Dr. Anna (voiced by Laara Sadiq) is the neighborhood physician; she is Indian. She assisted Mom Tiger give birth to Baby Margaret, got new eyeglasses for Prince Wednesday and has helped other characters with injuries or illnesses to recuperate. She is also a firefighter with Music Man Stan. She is allergic to peanuts. In the episode 'The Neighborhood Wedding', she marries Baker Aker and wears traditional Indian clothing. Though human, she shares several characteristics of the platypus family of Mister Rogers' Neighborhood: their patriarch, Bill Platypus, was the neighborhood physician and spoke with a foreign accent and his daughter was named Ana.
- Dr. Lee (voiced by Samantha Wan) is a doctor at the Neighborhood Hospital. She helps Daniel Tiger with his surgery on his ear alongside Nurse Miller in the season 5 episode "Daniel Goes to the Hospital".
- Nurse Miller (voiced by Carlos Diaz) is a doctor at the Neighborhood Hospital. He helps Daniel Tiger with his surgery on his ear alongside Dr. Lee in the season 5 episode "Daniel Goes to the Hospital".
- Mr. Malik (voiced by Huse Madhavji) is Daniel's substitute teacher in the episode, "Daniel's Substitute Teacher." He plays the harmonica and helps Daniel cope with Teacher Harriet's abcense. Mr. Malik helps Daniel and his friends put out the play, "Spring Sing."
- Trolley is a red, autonomous, trackless, semi-sentient trolley that transports Daniel and his friends anywhere in the Neighborhood of Make-Believe. It understands verbal commands clearly and replies by ringing its bell and blowing its whistle twice, which Daniel often imitates. It is the same trolley from Mister Rogers' Neighborhood.

== Production ==
In 2006, three years after Fred Rogers' death and after the end of production of Blue's Clues, The Fred Rogers Company contacted Angela Santomero to ask what type of show she would create to promote Rogers's legacy. That conversation led to the creation of Daniel Tiger's Neighborhood. PBS initially ordered 40 episodes, which were broadcast between September 3, 2012 and February 21, 2014. PBS Kids renewed the series for a second season of 20 episodes, which premiered on August 18, 2014. On July 7, 2015, the series was renewed for a third season of 25 episodes, which premiered on September 5, 2016. On October 11, 2017, the series was renewed for a fourth season of 20 episodes and a one-hour special Won't You Be Our Neighbor, which premiered on July 11, 2018.

In 2019, the series was renewed for a fifth season, which premiered on August 17, 2020 with Daniel Tiger's Neighborhood: Won't You Sing Along with Me?, a musical special that dealt with the COVID-19 pandemic. On August 20, 2021, the series was renewed for a sixth season, which premiered on September 5, 2022. A one-hour television movie, Daniel Visits a New Neighborhood, aired on June 20, 2022. On June 27, 2024, it was renewed for a seventh season, which premiered on August 12, 2024. On June 23, 2025, it was renewed for an eighth season, which premiered on June 29, 2026.

The series is produced by Pittsburgh-based Fred Rogers Productions (formerly The Fred Rogers Company and Family Communications), New York City-based Out of the Blue Enterprises (now 9 Story USA) and Toronto-based 9 Story Media Group, and animated with Adobe Animate (formerly Adobe Flash Professional) with music created at Voodoo Highway Music & Post. The show's theme song is sung by Graeme Cornies.

== Release and availability ==
Cartoon Network UK's sister preschool channel Cartoonito premiered Daniel Tiger's Neighborhood on March 1, 2016. It now airs on CBeebies in the UK with a British dub.

The series airs on CBC Kids, Family Jr., and Ici Radio-Canada Télé in Canada, ZeeQ in India, the Australian Broadcasting Corporation in Australia, RTÉ KIDSjr in Ireland, Disney Jr. (international) in Latin America and Southeast Asia, Nick Jr. (Italy) in Italy, France 5 in France, SVT Barn in Sweden, Hop! Channel in Israel, and TVNZ in New Zealand.

The series was previously available for streaming on Netflix before July 1, 2016, when a multi-year agreement for the catalog of many of PBS' children's series with Amazon Prime Video went into effect. A smaller selection of current episodes is also available through the PBS Kids app on several digital media player and tablet/smartphone platforms.

== Awards and nominations ==
Daniel Tiger's Neighborhood has won and been nominated for several awards in children's broadcasting. It won Silver Parents' Choice Awards in 2013 and 2014, was nominated for the Television Critics' Association Award for Outstanding Achievement in Youth Programming in 2013 and 2014 and was a 2014 Prix Jeunesse International Selection.

In 2019, it won the Daytime Emmy Award for Outstanding Pre-School Children's Animated Program. The show has been nominated at the Children's and Family Emmy Awards and Peabody Awards. Resources and apps were also honored by Kidscreen, the Webbys, and the Toy Association. The series has also won several Canadian Screen Awards.

== Impact ==
A research paper showed that Daniel Tiger's Neighborhood had a lasting impact on teenagers who watched the show growing up as toddlers.
