= Noonbory and the Super Seven =

- Genre: Children's television series Educational; Comedy; Action; Adventure; Preschool; Sketch comedy
- Created by: Wook Jung; Sung-Wook Jang
- Developed by: Wook Jung; Sung-Wook Jang
- Directed by: Giltae Kim; Laura Shepherd
- Voices of: Brent Hirose; Margaux Miller; Jacqui Fox; Jade Repeta; Markian Tarasiuk; Trevor Toffan; Reegan McCheyne
- Opening theme: "Noonbory and the Super Seven" (Voodoo Highway Music & Post Inc)
- Ending theme: "Noonbory and the Super Seven" (Voodoo Highway Music & Post Inc – instrumental)
- Countries of origin: Canada; South Korea
- Original languages: English; Korean
- No. of seasons: 2
- No. of episodes: 39 (78 segments)

Production
- Executive producers: Wook Jung; Hyun Dong Ahn; Wook-Ho Ham; Bul-kyung Kim; Michael Hirsh; Toper Taylor; Pamela Slavin; John Vandervelde
- Producers: Chun-Woo Lee; Wolf Kim; Changki Lee; Jennifer Picherack
- Running time: Approx. 28 minutes
- Production companies: Daewon Media; Cookie Jar Entertainment

Original release
- Network: EBS (South Korea); Knowledge (Canada); Access TV (Canada); BBC Kids (Canada); SCN (Canada)
- Release: September 19 – December 12, 2009

Noonbory and the Super Seven (Korean: 눈보리; RR: Nunbori) is a CGI animated children's television series that was co-produced by Daewon Media and Cookie Jar Entertainment in association with Knowledge, Access TV, BBC Kids, and SCN. It aired in the U.S. on August 15, 2009 (pilot) and September 19, 2009 (series) on CBS' KEWLopolis in August, and on CBS' Cookie Jar TV in September. It aired on EBS in South Korea. It also aired in Spanish in the United States on Sorpresa and UltraKidz.

== Summary ==
The pilot episode aired on KEWLopolis on CBS on August 15, 2009. It premiered on Cookie Jar TV on CBS on September 19, 2009. The first "o" on the "Noonbory and the Super 7" title is edited to look like Noonbory's face – indicating that he is the leader of the "Super Bory" pack. This show has a narrator who enhances the educational aspect of the show. Educational concepts taught in the show includes basic science components, teamwork, social skills, and memory.

Each of the seven superheroes are based on the five physical senses (sight, smell, taste, touch, and hear) in addition to the two mental senses (nonsense and common sense). Noonbory (the main character) is considered to have the ability for common sense. The settings include the four seasons (winter, spring, summer, and autumn) that make up the Technicolor world of Toobalooba. All the characters that are on the same side as the protagonists have the suffix -bory in their name while all the villains have the suffix -gury in their name. Instead of saying the word "everybody," people in the cartoon use the made-up word "everybory" instead (while occasionally saying "everybory and everygury").

The cast of villains include Wangury and his band of Bullygury pirates (Mungury and Taegury), a selfish girl named Rosygury, and an abominable snowman named Coldygury that can throw snowballs from his hat when he is angry at "somebory" or "somegury." Other characters including in the television show are the Beebees, Bakerbory, Doctorbory, Farmerbory, Babysitterbory, and the singing flowers. The series finale aired on CBS during the weekend of December 12–13, 2009. The Borys and Gurys celebrate Christmas in "Kiki's Gift" and "Santa's Cave".

== Show concepts ==
=== Borys and Gurys ===
- Everything has a black-and-white mentality to it; there is one neutral group called datori's that are neither Bory's Or Gury's. The datori's are a mixture between the lawful good nature of the Bory people and occasionally the mischief of the Gury people.
  - Any character with a suffix of "Bory" is a hero while anyone with a suffix of "Gury" is a villain. While this sounds simple and childish, that is how things are dealt with in Toobalooba.
  - A "Bory" can never become a "Gury" by doing an especially heinous deed (to counteract their good nature) and a "Gury" can never become a "Bory" by doing an exceptionally admirable deed (to counteract their evil nature).
- Although rarely seen, Borys and Gurys can co-exist with each other when the need arrives.
  - Doctorbory comes to give Coldygury some orders to rest when he was infected with Singeritis. The "disease" was spread from Coldygury to Lukybory and to Wangury and Cozybory before being contained.
  - In a previous episode, the Ghostygurys have also helped Noonbory and his friends defeat the plans of Wangury and his henchmen.
  - Rosygury has enlisted the help of Kikibory by pretending to be a Bory in distress. Using Kikibory, she has managed to steal valuables that belong to various members of the Bory tribe.
- However, Wangury never seeks of help of any Bory because he wants to conquer Toobalooba. He even makes enemies of the other Gurys (on a temporary basis) when they become nice to the Borys.
  - For example, Wangury steals Coldygury's sled when he wants to have a sled race with the Borys. At first, Coldygury was furious at the Borys for not having his sled and attacked them with snowballs. Wangury turned out to be the culprit near the end of the episode.
- Mamby is the only "Bory" that cannot speak, but can whistle and transform into just about anything, such as a parachute. This character has the additional ability to stretch its body far.

=== Abilities ===
- Taste – Having this super ability allows Totobory to taste things without actually consuming it. This is good for when Totobory has to compare some food-related item to another.
- Hear – This super ability permits Jetybory to hear things from far away.
- Sight – Lunabory can see things from farther away than anyone else.
- Nonsense – Lukybory has a hard time making sense of things; he has a younger sister named Kikibory who has a supersonic scream.
- Common sense – Noonbory uses this sense to figure out the most logical thing to do next. He is the only Bory with an older relative seen in the show.
- Smell – Pongdybory has the ability to smell things even though it occasionally followed by a powerful sneeze.
- Touch – Cozybory has the ability to feel things using the sense of touch.

=== Characters ===
Noonbory
Color: Green
Noonbory is a 10-year-old white bory, the leader of the SuperBorys and also the main protagonist of the series. He is the friendly, studious and thoughtful leader who often uses a helicopter device to fly across vast distances along with a green shield that can stop things in its track. He has two catchphrases, depending on the situation. As such, he has a habit of saying "Let's make super sense of this!" before they sensitize, or sometimes after they sensitize. His other catchphrase is "Hurry scurry", which he often says whenever anyone's not catching up, they are about to spring into action or occasionally when the situation calls for it. Noonbory wears headgear in the shape of Mamby and green fingerless gloves. He's voiced by Brent Hirose.
Mamby
Color: Gold
Mamby is Noonbory's small yellow and orange sidekick who is the smallest of the Borys. Unlike other borys, Mamby cannot speak, instead he whistles. Where as most bory's arms can't disappear, Mamby's arms can appear and disappear into his body at any time. Mamby can transform into anything, like a parachute or a mattress.
Cozybory
Color: Purple
Cozybory is a 9-year-old purple bory who is usually painting pictures or doing other feminine things while not out with the "Super Bory" team. She wears a light pink dress and likes to touch things. She's voiced by Jade Repeta.
Lunabory
Color: Yellow
Lunabory is an 8-year-old yellow bory, one of the Super 7, her super sense is the ability of sight she can see far distances with her super senses usually when the situation calls for it like when they need to find the gury that is usually causing trouble for the episode. Her catchphrase is "Seeing is believing" and has a habit of saying it when she uses her powers. One time, she used her powers to help win a game, but in the end she learned her lesson of cheating. She's voiced by Jacqui Fox.
Jetybory
Color: Magenta
Jetybory is a 9-year-old magenta bory and she is a member of the super seven and has the supersense of hearing and can hear from great distances. She's voiced by Margaux Miller.
Totobory
Color: Brown
Totobory is an 8-year-old brown bory. His supersense taste he can taste things without actually eating the food, he also has these leaf like petals on his head that act like tentacles that can allow him pick these that either far away or too high. He's voiced by Markian Tarasiuk.
Pongdybory
Color: Blue
Pongdybory is a 7-year-old blue bory. He has the supersense of smell and is able to smell things from far away. When he uses that, two light pink snout-like markings on his face glow, although it is occasionally followed by a powerful sneeze. He's voiced by Trevor Toffan.
Lukybory
Color: Yellow
Lukybory is the seventh unofficial member of the Super 7. He is an 8-year-old yellow and orange bory and he represents nonsense he tends to make the situation unintentionally worse as he is the only other member who doesn't have a supersense other than Noonbory. Sometimes he provides the answer to the situation. Lukybory doesn't have any powers, unlike his little sister Kikibory, who has the ability to emit super sound. He's voiced by Reegan T.D. McCheyne.
Kikibory
Color: Pink
Kikibory is the little sister of Lukybory. She is a 6-year-old pink and light pink bory and she has the ability to emit supersound waves from her mouth.
Hanubi
Noonbory's grandfather Hanubi can perform all sorts of magical acts from disappearing to teleportation to switching peoples minds in different bodies. Sometimes, though he can be distracted. In one episode, he used a spell that made everything smaller and multiplied by six. He accidentally made six little Wangurys because he said "Too tired and too late to look, need a magical fix, make this smaller and do it times six." Hanubi is very old and wise. He carries a magic stick (staff) from a very old tree and looks like an older version of Noonbory with a mustache.
Builderborys
The Builderborys are a group a borys who build things for other borys throughout village. Their craftmanship ranges around carpentry such as building swings and toys. They always were there hard hats when on the job to be safe when they are building. Usually they are frequently in distressed some episodes.
Babysitterbory
Babysitterbory looks after the town's small Kidborys. She has occasionally enlisted help from others to watch them, such as Cozybory.
Doctorbory
Doctorbory has been known not only to treat Borys but Gurys as well. She is the only Bory to be treated with respect by Wangury. For illnesses like Singeritis, Doctorbory always gives out a sweet treat.
Coldygury
Coldygury can only live in Winter where it is always cold. He speaks in sentences using the style of an illeist and is often the first to help a Bory. Always targeted by Wangury, Coldygury has a defense mechanism of throwing snowballs at anyone when he gets angry. If taken too close to Spring (where the Borys live), Coldygury starts to melt and become smaller until he vanishes completely.
Ghostygurys
Living in the haunted forest, all the Ghostygurys want to have some peace and quiet with anybody to disturb their rest. They have been known to scare Wangury in addition to Noonbory's gang.
Wangury
Wangury is the evil pirate mastermind who wants to take over Toobalooba and spread general havoc. Hated among even the other Gurys, Wangury is the most chaotic evil in Noonbory's world – spreading mischief and "super silly villainy" without respect for common sense. Wangury lives in a pirate ship but is never seen sailing it. He is the most commonly seen "silly villain" in the series.
Mungury and Taegury
The secondary antagonists of the series, Mungury and Taegury are two dim-witted pirate frog gurys who are Wangury’s underlings. Mungury resembles a yellow frog, has brown eyes, and wears a blazer and a blue, fancy pirate hat. Taegury resembles a green frog and has buckteeth, has green eyes, and wears a green bandana.
Rosygury
Rosygury is a young female Gury that lives near the Bory Village. She likes her roses and attacks any Bory who threatens her rose garden with vines. Unlike the other guries, Rosygury has a tall, slim appearance in contrast to everyone else’s chibi look. She's voiced by Melanie Dahling.
Dozegury
Dozegury is a dragon gury that is also evil. He is able to turn invisible and, like other dragons, breathes smoke out of his nose. It is unknown if he breathes fire. He also can be seen carrying his trademark umbrella.
Evil Noonbory
Evil Noonbory is Noonbory's evil clone who first and only appeared in season 1 episode "Double Trouble". He was created by Dozegury. He tries to steal things in ToobaLooba. He's voiced by Brent Hirose.

== Episode list ==
Season #	Episode #	Title	Date Aired
1	1	"Wangury Wants to Fly / Luky's Bubble Trouble"	September 19, 2009
1	2	"Coldygury and the Hot Lost Buns / Luky and the Runaway Tree"	September 19, 2009
1	3	"Ship Shape / Coldy's Snow Gurys"	September 26, 2009
1	4	"Wangury and the Windbike / Opposites Attract"	September 26, 2009
1	5	"Cozybory's Treasure Hunt / Big, Bigger, Biggest!"	October 3, 2009
1	6	"Ready, Steady, Go / Kiki's Best Friend"	October 3, 2009
1	7	"Loud and Clear / Kidnapped Kiddy-Cake"	October 10, 2009
1	8	"Problem Peach / Rosygury and the Bee Bee Trap"	October 10, 2009
1	9	"To Catch a Star / Hide and Go Squeak"	October 17, 2009
1	10	"Pongdybory's Cold Feet / Coldygury and the Dotories"	October 17, 2009
1	11	"Wangury's Silly Statue / Rock and Roll Mamby"	October 24, 2009
1	12	"Disappearing Act / Lukybory's Cape Caper"	October 24, 2009
1	13	"Pogo Go Stop! / Looba-Nutta Surprise"	October 31, 2009
1	14	"Bee-Bee Come Back! / Diggin' Dotoris"	October 31, 2009
1	15	"The Long and Short of It / The Gury Monster"	November 7, 2009
1	16	"The Great Switcheroo / A Honey of a Tale"	November 7, 2009
1	17	"Singeritis! / What's Up, Beavyuck?"	November 14, 2009
1	18	"A Coldy Day in Toobalooba / A Ghostygury Tale"	November 14, 2009
1	19	"Invisibory! / Kiki's Whistle"	November 21, 2009
1	20	"Sleds Away! / A Rosy Day"	November 21, 2009
1	21	"A Little Too Much Wangury! / Luky's Big Idea"	November 28, 2009
1	22	"Adventures in Kidborysitting / Ring Around the Dozygury"	November 28, 2009
1	23	"Bragging Rights / Double Trouble!"	December 5, 2009
1	24	"Tooba-Achooba! / Luky to the Rescue!"	December 5, 2009
1	25	"Kiki's Gift / Santa's Cave"	December 12, 2009
1	26	"Cozy and the Rosy-stalk! / Play it Again, Luky!"	December 12, 2009

Season 2

Season #	Episode #	Title	Date Aired
2	1	"New Friend / Delicious Seed"	January 10, 2011
2	2	"Chicks Are Born / Parrot the Troublemaker"	January 10, 2011
2	3	"Elephant, Rainbow Maker / Magical Seeds"	January 17, 2011
2	4	"Pink Aru's First Errand / Lukybory's Bread"	January 17, 2011
2	5	"Guard the Storage / Who Stole the Carrot?"	January 24, 2011
2	6	"Hippo with Toothache / Haruby's Old Hat"	January 24, 2011
2	7	"Shades Under Tree / Chicken Daddy with Hiccups"	January 31, 2011
2	8	"I'm the Super Lukybory / Giraffe and Baby Bird"	January 31, 2011
2	9	"Blast Party / Crybabies"	February 7, 2011
2	10	"Pink Aru and Hedgehog / Small Concert"	February 7, 2011
2	11	"Let's Play Together / Baby Penguins in Winter Village"	February 14, 2011
2	12	"Missing Puzzle Piece / Cheerful Match"	February 14, 2011
2	13	"Bowerbird, House Decorator / Hop Hop Baby Kangaroo"	February 21, 2011
