= List of Korean animated television series =

This is a list of Korean animated TV shows sorted by year.

== List of Korean animated shows in each decade ==
=== 1970s ===
- Squirrel and Hedgehog / 다람이와 고슴도치 (1977) (NK)

=== 1980s ===
- Boy General / 소년장수 (1982) (NK)
- Clever Raccoon Dog / 다람이와 고슴도치 (1987) (NK)
- Tteodori Kkachi / 떠돌이 까치 (1987)
- Kkachi's Wings / 까치의 날개 (1988)
- Dooly the Little Dinosaur / 아기공룡 둘리 (1987)
- Fairy Land ABC / 동화나라 ABC (1987)
- Hello Kitty / 헬로 키티 (1988)
- Run Hani / 달려라 하니 (1988)
- Naughty Hani / 천방지축 하니 (1989)
- 2020 Space Wonder Kiddy / 2020 우주의 원더키디 (1989)
- Wizard Boy Mutterl / 머털도사 (1989)

=== 1990s ===
- Once Upon a Time / 옛날 옛적에 (1990)
- Yeongsimi / 영심이 (1990)
- General of the Earth / 흙꼭두장군 (1991)
- Fly Superboard / 날아라 슈퍼보드 (1991, 1998, 2001)
- Pink the Fairy / 요정 핑크 (1991)
- Penking and Linking / 펭킹 라이킹 (1992)
- Kori, The Son of Wizard / 마법사의 아들 코리 (1993)
- School of Love / 사랑의 학교 (1994)
- Koby Koby / 꼬비꼬비 (1995)
- Dooly's Backpacking / 둘리의 배낭여행 (1995)
- Dodami and Tori Tori / 도담이와 토리토리 (1995)
- Duchi and Puku / 두치와 뿌꾸 (1996)
- Cute Chocomi / 귀여운 쪼꼬미 (1996)
- Soul Frame Lazenca / 영혼기병 라젠카 (1997)
- The Green Chariot Hamos / 녹색전차 해모수 (1997)
- Bio-Cop Wingo / 바이오캅 윙고 (1998)
- LullaRarra / 룰루라라 (1998)
- Noodle-Nude / 누들누드 (1998)
- Speed King Bungae / 스피드왕 번개 (1998)
- Black Rubber Shoes / 검정 고무신 (1999, 2001, 2004, 2015)
- Restol, The Special Rescue Squad / 레스톨 특수구조대 (1999)
- Milo's Bug Quest / 마일로의 대모험 (1999)

=== 2000s ===
- Clover 4/3 / 클로버 4/3 (2000)
- Pucca web animated series (2000)
- Galactic Bear Constellation 2000 / 은하곰 별자리 2000 (2000)
- Taekwon King Kang Tae-Pung / 태권왕 강태풍 (2000)
- Track City / 트랙시티 (2000)
- White Heart Beakgu / 하얀마음 백구 (2000)
- Rainbow Nymph TongTong / 무지개요정 통통 (2001)
- Taeng-gu and Ulasyong / 탱구와 울라숑 (2001)
- UniMinipet / 유니미니펫 (2001)
- BASToF Syndrome / 바스토프 레몬 (2001)
- Ki Fighter Taerang / 기파이터 태랑 (2001)
- Geisters / 가이스터즈 (2001)
- Ajang.com / 아장닷컴 (2001)
- Che Che Pong / 채채퐁 김치퐁 (2002)
- Olympus Guardian / 올림포스 가디언 (2002)
- Super Duper Sumos / 으랏차차 삼총사 (2002)
- The Legend Of Blue / 바다의 전설 장보고 (2002)
- Space Hip-hop Duck / 스페이스 힙합덕 (2002)
- There She Is!! / 떳다 그녀!! (2003)
- Spheres / 스피어즈 (2003)
- Guardian Fairy Michel / 수호요정 미셸 (2003)
- Tank Knights Fortress / 무한 전기 포트 리스 (2003)
- Hey Yo Yorang / 요랑아 요랑아 (2003)
- Woobi Boy / 내 친구 우비소년 (2003)
- Pororo the Little Penguin / 뽀롱뽀롱 뽀로로 (2003)
- Narong, Fly To The Sky / 뚜루뚜루뚜 나롱이 (2004)
- Mix Master / 카드왕 믹스마스터 (2005)
- Maskman / 마스크맨(애니메이션) (2005)
- Jaedong, Let's Go To School / 재동아 학교가자 (2005)
- Gomi's Cartoon Curiosity Heaven / 고미의 만화 호기심 천국 (2005)
- Jang Geum's Dream / 장금이의 꿈 (2005, 2007)
- Tori Go! Go! / 토리 고! 고! (2006)
- Z-Squad / 크리스탈요정 지스쿼드 (2006)
- Bug Fighter / 인조곤충 버그파이터 (2006)
- Iron Kid / 아이언키드 (2006)
- Kungya Kungya / 쿵야쿵야 (2006)
- Apple Candy Girl / 애플캔디 걸 (2006)
- Pucca / 짜장소녀 뿌까 (2006)
- Bernard / 빼꼼 (2006)
- Revbahaf Kingdom Rebuilding Story / 르브바하프 왕국 재건설기 (2007)
- Doyajibong / 도야지봉 (2007)
- Crazy Park / 다오 배찌 붐힐 대소동 (2007)
- Chiro & Friends / 치로와 친구들 (2007)
- Tai Chi Chasers / 태극천자문 (2007)
- Cocomong / 코코몽 (2008)
- Petit Petit Muse / 쁘띠쁘띠 뮤즈 (2008)
- Aesop's Theater / 꼬잉꼬잉 이솝극장 (2008)
- Colorful Crayons / 알록달록 크레용 (2008)
- NEW Dooly the Little Dinosaur / 뉴 아기공룡 둘리 (2008)
- Giga Tribe / 기가 트라이브 (2008/2009)
- Greensaver / 그린세이버 (2009)
- Kokomom / 와글와글 꼬꼬맘 (2009)
- Element Hunters / 엘리먼트 헌터 (2009)
- Rolling Stars / 롤링 스타즈 (2009)
- YooHoo & Friends / 유후와 친구들 (2009)

=== 2010s ===
- My Friend Haechi / 내 친구 해치 (2010)
- Mix Master: Final Force / 최강 합체 믹스마스터 (2010)
- Balloopo / 풍선코끼리 발루뽀 (2010)
- Bubblegum Cook / 보글보글쿡 (2010)
- Vroomiz / 부릉! 부릉! 브루미즈 (2010)
- MetaJets / 메타제트 (2010)
- Cloud Bread / 구름빵 (2010)
- Pom Pom and Friends / 피들리팜 (2010)
- Tobot / 또봇 (2010)
- The Story of Miho / 미호이야기 (2011)
- Ghost Messenger / 고스트 메신저 (2011)
- Art Odyssey / 미술탐험대 (2011)
- Larva / 라바 (2011)
- Eori / 어리이야기 (2011)
- Robocar Poli / 로보카 폴리 (2011)
- Kemy / 깨미 (2011)
- Cheap Cheonllima Mart / 쌉니다 천리마마트 (2011)
- Hello Jadoo / 안녕 자두야 (2011)
- Zoobles! / 쥬블스 (2011)
- Gon / 곤 (2012)
- Welcome to Convenience Store / 와라 편의점 (2012)
- Subin and Friends / 수빈스토리 (2012)
- Paboo & Mojies / 빠뿌야 놀자 (2012)
- The Airport Diary / 두리둥실 뭉게공항 (2012)
- NEW Wizard Boy Mutterl / 신 머털도사 (2012)
- Kioka / 키오카 (2012)
- Secret Jouju / 치링치링 시크릿 쥬쥬 (2012)
- Mask Master / 마스쿨랜드 (2013)
- School Land / 스쿨랜드 (2013)
- Don't Let Go of the Mental Rope / 놓지마 정신줄 (2014)
- Towards Astar Chagu Chagu / 아스타를 향해 차구차구 (2014)
- Bubble Marin / 버블버블 마린 (2014)
- Hello Carbot / 헬로 카봇 (2014)
- Miniforce / 미니특공대 (2014)
- Super Wings / 출동! 슈퍼윙스 (2014)
- Duda & Dada / 두다다쿵 (2014)
- Princess Pring in the Birthday Kingdom / 생일왕룩의 프린세스프링 (2015)
- Galaxy Kids / 갤럭시키즈 (2015)
- Turning Mecard / 터닝메카드 (2015)
- Zombiedumb / 좀비덤 (2015)
- Spookiz / 스푸키즈 (2015)
- DinoCore / 다이노코어 (2016)
- Flowering Heart / 플라워링 하트 (2016)
- Magic Adventures / 매직어드벤쳐 (2016)
- Whee Wheels / 용감한 소방차 레이 (2016)
- Elsword: El Lady / 엘소드: 엘의 여인 (2016)
- Closers: SIDE BLACKLAMBS / 클로저스 (2016)
- Telemonster / 텔레묻스터 (2016)
- The Haunted House / 신비아파트 (2016) (CJ ENM, Tooniverse)
- senior class / 졸업반 (2016)
- Capsule Boy - Protect the Universe / 캡슐보이 - 우주를 지켜라 (2016)
- Shining Star / 샤이닝스타 (2017)
- Banzi's Secret Diary / 반지의 비밀일기 (2017)
- Dinosaur Mecard / 공룡메카드 (2017)
- NoRi, Roller Coaster Boy / 롤러코스터 보이,노리 (2017)
- Running Man / 런닝맨 (2017, 2019)
- AEROVER / 에어로버 (2018), Aerover: Return Of The Space Drones and Aerover: Rebirth Of the Phoenix, 2018, 26 episodes, competitive drone flying
- The Journey Home / 스페이스벅스 (2018)
- Pasha Mecard / 빠샤메카드 (2018)
- Little Hero Super Zach / 꼬마히어로 슈퍼잭 (2018)
- The Sound of Heart / 마음의 소리 (2018) (Naver)
- Mashimaro / 마시마로 (2018)
- Semi in the Magic Cube / 세미와 매직큐브 (2018)
- Bread Barbershop / 브레드 이발소 (2019)
- Journey of Long / 롱롱죽겠지? (2019)
- Bagel Girl / 어느 날 잠에서 깨어보니 베이글녀가 되어 있었다 (2019) (Laftel)
- Metallion or Metallions, 2019–2020, 104 episodes, mecha, kids show

=== 2020s ===
- Hero Circle / 히어로 써클 (2020)
- Hanni and the Wild Woods / 하니와 숲속친구들 (2020)
- Catch! Teenieping / 캐치! 티니핑 (2020)
- Super Secret / 슈퍼 시크릿 (2020) (Laftel, Studio Shelter)
- Maca & Roni / 마카앤로니 (2021)
- Jungle Box / 정글박스 (2021)
- Dalja The Vampire Girl / 뱀파이어소녀 달자 (2021)
- After School Treasure Hunt (Pilot) / 방과후 트레저헌팅 (2021)
- Goblin Hill / 도깨비언덕에 왜 왔니? (2021)
- Time Traveler Luke / 시간여행자 루크 (2021)
- Semantic Error Special / 시맨틱 에러 스페셜 (2021) (Laftel)
- My Daughter Is a Zombie / 좀비딸 (2022)
- Joobi the fantastic fox / 마법여우 주비 (2022)
- Codename X / 코드네임 X (2022)
- Lookism / 외모지상주의 (2022) (Netflix, Studio Mir)
- Space Shaman Hunters (Pilot) / 스페이스 샤먼 헌터 (2022)
- Dinoman / 다이노맨 (2022)
- The Bigfoots on Topsy-Turvy Island / 뒤죽박죽섬의 빅풋패밀리 (2022)
- My Secret friend Hamzzi / 내 비밀친구 햄찌 (2022)
- Metal Cardbot / 메탈카드봇 (2023)
- Shasha & Milo / 샤샤 & 마일로 (2023)
- Creature Hunters (Pilot) / 크리쳐 헌터스 (2023)
- Battle Marvelians (Series) / 배틀 마블리언즈 (202?)
- Demon Queen Just Wants to Make Peace / 마왕님은 죽고 싶어 (2023) (Laftel)
- Alien Stage (ALNST) (2022)
- 4 Week Lovers / 4주 애인 (2023)
- Codename X : doomsday / 코드명 엑: X 종말 (2023)
- Yellow Muzi & Friends / 내 마음은 무지 (2023)
- [[Rainbow Bubblegem]] / 레인보우 버블젬 (2023)
- Bastions / 베스티언즈 (2023)
- WishCat / 위시캣 (2024)
- No Love Zone / 연애 제한구역 (2024) (Laftel)
- Seasons of Blossom / 청춘 블라썸 (2024)
- Joobi the fantastic fox Ibosa magic school / 마법여우 주비 이보사 마법학교 (2024)
- Cubistar / 큐비스타 (202?)
- Tiger Coming In / 호랑이 들어와요 (2024) (Laftel)
- Guardians of the Video Game / 전자오락수호대 (202?)
- The Dangerous Convenience Store / 위험한 편의점 (2024)
- No Home / 집이 없어 (2024) (Laftel)
- Tale of the Nine Tailed Tiger: The Beginning of a Lotus / 구미호뎐: 연의 시작 (2025)
- Green Apple Paradise / 청사과낙원 (2025)
- Pyramid Game / 피라미드 게임 (2025)
- Yonghan Soneyo / 용한 소녀 (2025) (Laftel)
- Maru is a Puppy (2025) (Laftel)
- The Boxer / 더 복서 (2025)
- Housekeeper / 하우스키퍼 (202?)
- Nano List / 나노리스트 (202?)
- True Beauty / 여신강림 (2024)
- Exorcism Chronicles (Toemarok) / 퇴마록 (202?)
- King's Maker / 킹스메이커 (202?)
- BARKHAN / 호랑이형님 (202?)
- Terror Man / 테러맨 (2026)
- One Room TA (2026)
- Tomb Raider King / 도굴왕 (2026)
- Return of the Blossoming Blade / 화산귀환 (202?)
- The World After the Fall / 멸망 이후의 세계 (202?)

== See also ==
- South Korean animation
- North Korean animation
- Manhwa
- History of Korean animation
- List of Korean animated films
