= List of Korean animated films =

This is a list of Korean animated films, sorted by year, in South Korea and North Korea; they are in Korean language only.

== List of Korean animated films by decade ==
=== The 1960s ===
- A Story of Hong Gil-dong / 풍운아 홍길동 (1967)
- Hopi and Chadol Bawi / 호피와 차돌바위 (1967)
- Heungbu and Nolbu / 흥부와 놀부 (1967)
- The Golden Iron Man / 황금철인 (1968)
- Sonokong / 손오공 (1968)
- General Hong Gil-dong / 홍길동 장군 (1969)
- Treasure Island / 보물섬 (1969)

=== The 1970s ===
- Lightning Atom / 번개아텀 (1971)
- Robot Taekwon V / 로보트 태권브이|로보트 태권브이 (1976)
- Cheorin 007 / 철인 007 (1976)
- Robot Taekwon V: Space Mission / 로보트 태권 V – 제2탄 우주작전 (1976)
- Taekwon Kids Maruchi and Arachi / 태권동자 마루치 아라치 (1977)
- Electronic Man 337 / 전자인간337 (1977)
- Gold Wing 123 / 황금날개 123 (1978)
- Kongjui & Patchui / 콩쥐 팥쥐 (1978)
- 77 Group's Secret / 77단의 비밀 (1978)
- Robot Taekwon V vs. Golden Wings Showdown / 로보트 태권V 대 황금날개의 대결 (1978)
- Run, Wonder Princess! / 날아라 원더공주 (1978)
- Dallyeora Majingga X / 달려라 마징가 X (1978)
- General Ttoli / 똘이장군 (1979) - South Korea's first anti-communist animated film. Since this animated film became popular with Korean children, numerous anti-communist animated films have been produced in South Korea. However, the film is also criticized for its explicit portrayal of violence and political messages.
- Taegeuksonyeon Huin Doksuri / 태극소년 흰 독수리 (1979)
- Starland Trio / 별나라 삼총사 (1979)
- Star Wars with Sun Wukong / Sonogonggwa byeoldeurui-ro jeonjaeng (1979)
- Eunhahamdae Jiguho / 은하함대 지구호 (1979)
- Fly! Spaceship Geobukseon / 날아라! 우주전함 거북선 (1979)
- Black Star and Golden Bat / 검은 별과 황금박쥐 (1979) - An animated film showcasing a character parodied of the Japanese superhero character of the same name, Golden Bat, who was really popular in Korea at the time, although his appearance is notably modeled on Batman with a yellow suit colorization to match the former's characteristics.
- Dokkaebi Gamtu / 도깨비 감투 (1979)
- Gancheopjamneun Ttorijanggun / 간첩잡는 똘이장군 (1979)
- Animal Treasure Island / Dongmul Bomulseom (1979)
- Ujusonyeon Kaesi / 우주소년 캐시 (1979)

=== The 1980s ===
- Time Machine 001 / 삼총사 타임머신 001 (1980)
- The Tale of the Three Kingdoms – Oath of the Peach Garden / 삼국지 – 도원결의 (1980)
- Ujudaejang aekkunun / 우주대장 애꾸눈 (1980)
- 15 Sonyeon Uju Pyoryugi / 15소년 우주 표류기 (1980)
- The Tale of the Three Kingdoms – Breaking Through the Five Gulfs / 삼국지 – 관우 오관돌파편 (1980)
- Kkomaeosa Ttori / 꼬마어사 똘이 (1980)
- Sonyeon 007 Eunhateukgongdae / 소년 007 은하특공대 (1980)
- 3000 Leagues in Search of Mother / 엄마 찾아 삼천리 (1981)
- Sonyeon 007 Jihajeguk / 소년 007 지하제국 (1981)
- Gugugui taeyang seongung isunsin / 구국의 태양 성웅 이순신 (1981)
- Gongnyong Baengmannyeon Ttori / 공룡 100만년 똘이 (1981)
- Robot King / 로보트킹 (1981)
- Hokseongnoboteu Sseondeo A / 혹성 로보트 썬더 A (1982)
- Heungnyongwanggwa Bihodongja / 흑룡왕과 비호동자 (1982)
- Adventure of Headol / 해돌이 대모험 (1982)
- Eunhajeonseol Tera / 은하전설 테라 (1983)
- Miraesonyeon Kunta Beomyuda 5000 Nyeon / 미래소년 쿤타 버뮤다 5000년 (1983)
- Haejeotamheomdae Marin X / 해저탐험대 마린엑스 (1983)
- Chohabgeum roboteu SOLAR I.II.III / 초합금 로보트 쏠라 원.투.드리 (1983)
- Hwanggeum-ui pal / 황금의 팔 (1983)
- Space Gundam V / 스페이스 간담 브이 (1983)
- Protectors of Universe / 슈퍼특급 마징가 7 (1983)
- Computer Haekjeonham Pokpadaejakjeon / 콤퓨터핵전함 폭파대작전 (1983)
- Hwanggeumnyeonpilgwa Gaegujangi Oegyesonyeon / 황금연필과 개구장이 외계소년 (1983)
- Cheol-in samchongsa / 철인 삼총사 (1983)
- Space Champion Hong Gil-dong / 우주전사 홍길동 (1983)
- David & Goliath / 다윗과 골리앗 (1983)
- Dokgotak – Throw It Towards the Sun / 독고탁 태양을 향해 던져라 (1983)
- Syupeo Taitan 15 / 슈퍼 타이탄15 (1983)
- UFO Reul Tagoon Oegyein Wangja / UFO를 타고온 외계인 왕자 (1983)
- Phoenix-bot Phoenix King / 불사조 로보트 피닉스 킹 (1984)
- The King of Inventions / 꾸러기 발명왕 (1984)
- Dokgo-Tak 2 – My Name is Dokgo-Tak / 내 이름은 독고탁 (1984)
- 84 Taekwon V / 로보트 태권V - 84 태권브이 (1984)
- Ttoriwa Jeta Roboteu / 똘이와 제타 로보트 a. k. a. 김청기 로봇군단 슈퍼제타 (1985)
- Robot King Sun Shark / 로보트왕 썬샤크 (1985)
- Dokgo Tak 3 – The Mound Rediscovered / 독고탁 3 – 다시 찾은 마운드 (1985)
- The Robot Corps and Mecha 3 / 로보트군단과 메카3 (1985)
- Mujeokcheorin lamboteu / 무적철인 람보트 (1985)
- Dokkaebi bangmang-i / 도깨비 방망이 (1986)
- Gaksital / 각시탈 (1986)
- Tteodori Kkachi / 떠돌이 까치 (1987)
- Dokgo Tak-ui bidulgi habchang / 독고탁의 비둘기 합창 (1987)

=== The 1990s ===
- The Murtal Master and 108 Youkai / 머털도사와 108 요괴 (1990)
- The Adventures of Lotty / 로티의 모험 (1990)
- Jang Dok-dae / 장독대 (1991)
- Heukkkokdujanggun / 흙꼭두장군 (1991)
- Kkulbeorui chingu / 꿀벌의 친구 (1992)
- Special Gag Force Robot Twins / 개그특공대 로봇트윈스 (1993)
- Street Fighter / 거리의 무법자 (1993)
- Super Kid / 슈퍼 차일드 (1994)
- Blue Seagull / 블루시걸 (1994)
- The Red Hawk / 붉은 매 (1995)
- The Hungry Best 5 / 헝그리 베스트5 (1995)
- Dol-a-on yeong-ung Hong Gil-dong / 돌아온 영웅 홍길동 (1995)
- Space Armageddon / 아마게돈 (1996)
- Little Dinosaur Dooly / 아기공룡 둘리 - 얼음별 대모험 (1996)

=== The 2000s ===
- My Beautiful Girl, Mari / 마리이야기 (2002)
- Oseam / 오세암 (2003)
- Hammerboy / 망치 (2003)
- Sky Blue (film) / 원더풀 데이즈 (2003)
- The Toy Warrior (2005)
- Aachi & Ssipak / 아치와 씨팍 (2006)
- A Coffee Vending Machine and Its Sword / Coffee Samurai (2007)
- Yobi, The Five-Tailed Fox / 천년여우 여우비 (2007)

=== The 2010s ===
- The King of Pigs / 돼지의 왕 (2011)
- Leafie, A Hen into the Wild / 마당을 나온 암탉 (2011)
- Speckles: The Tarbosaurus /점박이: 한반도의 공룡 (2012)
- Green Days: Dinosaur and I / 소중한 날의 꿈 (2012)
- Padak (2012 film) / 파닥파닥 (2012)
- Hello Jadoo: The Little Mermaid - Part 1 / 안녕자두야: 인어공주 (2013)
- Pororo, The Racing Adventure / 뽀로로 극장판 슈퍼썰매 대모험 (2013)
- The Satellite Girl and Milk Cow / 우리별 일호와 얼룩소 (2014)
- Ghost Messenger / 고스트 메신저 (2014)
- Pororo, Snow Fairy Adventure / 뽀로로 극장판 눈요정 마을 대모험 (2014)
- Timing / 타이밍 (2015)
- Pororo 3: Cyber Space Adventure / 뽀로로 극장판3 : 컴퓨터왕국대모험 (2015)
- Hello Jadoo: Theatrical Cut / 극장판 안녕자두야 (2016)
- Lost in the Moonlight / 달빛궁궐 (2016)
- Seoul Station / 서울역 (2016)
- Hello Jadoo: A Journey to the West / 안녕자두야: 서유기 어쩌다 영웅 (2017)
- Pororo, Dinosaur Island Adventure / 뽀로로 극장판 공룡섬 대모험 (2017)
- Hello Jadoo: Under the Sea (including "The Little Mermaid - Part 2") / 안녕자두야: 언더더씨 (2018)
- The Haunted House: The Secret of the Cave / 신비아파트: 금빛 도깨비와 비밀의 동굴 (2018)
- Underdog / 언더독 (2018)
- Bad Boss / 나쁜 상사 (2018)
- Hello Jadoo: Masterpiece Fairy Tale / 안녕자두야: 명작동화 (2019)
- Pororo Movie: Great Adventure on Treasure Island / 뽀로로 극장판 보물섬 대모험 (2019)
- The Haunted House: The Sky Goblin VS Jormungandr / 극장판 신비아파트: 하늘도깨비 대 요르문간드 (2019)

=== The 2020s ===
- Beauty Water / 기기괴괴 - 성형수 (2020)
- Stress Zero / 스트레스 제로 (2021)
- Hello Jadoo: The Secret of Jeju Island / 극장판 안녕자두야: 제주도의 비밀 (2022)
- The Haunted House: The Dimensional Goblin and the Seven Worlds / 신비아파트 극장판 차원도깨비와 7개의 세계 (2022)
- Pororo: Dragon Castle Adventure / 뽀로로 극장판 드래곤캐슬 대모험 (2022)
- Pororo and Friends: Virus Busters / 뽀로로와 친구들: 바이러스를 없애줘! (2022)
- Colossus: Child of the Wind / 거신: 바람의 아이 (2023) (GRIMAE)
- Pororo Pop Star Adventure / 뽀로로 극장판 슈퍼스타 대모험 (2023)
- Yumi’s Cells: The Movie / 유미의 세포들 (2024) (Naver, Sidus Animation)
- The Haunted House Special: Red Eyed Reaper / 신비아파트 특별편: 붉은 눈의 사신 (2024)
- Pororo: The Great Undersea Adventure / 뽀로로 극장판 바닷속 대모험 (2025)
- The Witcher: Sirens of the Deep / 위쳐: 세이렌의 바다 (2025)
- Exorcism Chronicles: The Beginning / 퇴마록 (based on the 1993 web novel Toemarok by Lee Woo-hyeok) (2025) (Locus Animation (formerly known as Sidus Animation))
- Mr. Robot / 미스터 로봇 (2025)
- The King of Kings / 킹 오브 킹스 (2025)
- Secret Juju: Magic Harmony / 시크릿쥬쥬 마법의 하모니 (2025)
- Lost in Starlight / 이 별에 필요한 (2025)
- Your Letter / 연의 편지 (2025) (Naver, LICO)
- Bad Girls: Run Hani / 나쁜계집애: 달려라 하니 (2025)
- Ally / 앨리 (2027)
- Kokdu / 꼭두 (2027) (Locus Animation) (based on the 2017 play of the same name by director Kim Tae-yong)
- Legendary Moonlight Sculptor / 달빛조각사 (202?) (Studio W.Baba)
- Dragon Raja / 드래곤 라자 (202?) (Locus Animation)

== See also ==
- South Korean animation
- North Korean animation
- Manhwa
- History of Korean animation
- List of Korean animated television series
