= Brand licensing =

Renting or leasing of an intangible asset

Brand licensing means renting or leasing of an intangible asset. It is a process of creating and managing contracts between the owner of a brand and a company or individual who wants to use the brand in association with a product, for an agreed period of time, within an agreed territory. Licensing is used by brand owners to extend a trademark or character onto products of a completely different nature.

Examples of intangible assets include a song ("Over the Rainbow"), a character (Donald Duck), a name (David Beckham), or a brand (Rolls-Royce). An arrangement to license a brand requires a licensing agreement. A licensing agreement authorizes a company which markets a product or service (a licensee) to lease or rent a brand from a brand owner who operates a licensing program (a licensor).

== History ==
Brand licensing is a well-established business, in both patents and trademarks. A concept established in British business, the world's first licensed character was a soft toy of Peter Rabbit, a fictional character created by Beatrix Potter and patented in 1903, to be sold alongside the first public edition of The Tale of Peter Rabbit. Merchandise of Peter and other Potter characters have been sold at Harrods department store in London since at least 1910 when the range first appeared in their catalogues. For the rest of her career, Potter would continue to oversee merchandising and licensing opportunities for her characters, with Peter depicted in a multitude of spinoff merchandise such as porcelain figurines, painting books and dishes.

Trademark licensing also has a rich history in American business, largely beginning with the rise of mass entertainment such as the movies, comics and later television. Mickey Mouse's popularity in the 1930s and 1940s resulted in an explosion of toys, books, and consumer products with the character's likeness on them, none of which were manufactured by the Walt Disney Company. McDonald's play food, Burger King T-shirts and even ghastly Good Humor Halloween costumes became commonplace. Brand extensions later made the brand licensing marketplace much more lucrative, as companies realized they could make real dollars renting out their equity to manufacturers. Instead of spending millions of dollars to create a new brand, companies were willing to pay a royalty on net sales of their products to rent the product of an established brand name. Armor All auto vacuums, Breyers yogurt, TGI Friday's frozen appetizers, and Lucite nail polish are only a handful of the products carrying well-known brand names which are made under license by companies unrelated to the companies who own the brand.

== Reasons for licensing ==
A company may choose to license its brand(s) when they believe there is strong consumer acceptance for brand extensions or products.

Apart from benefits to licensors, there are benefits to licensees as well. Licensees lease the rights to a brand for incorporation into their merchandise, but do not share ownership in it. Having access to major national and global brands, and the logos and trademarks associated with those brands, gives the licensee significant benefits. The most important of these is the marketing power the brand brings to the licensee's products. When brand managers enter or extend into new product categories via licensing they create an opportunity for a licensee to grow their company. Below is an example of the licensed product process steps:

- Licensor chooses the product categories to be licensed
- Licensor finds and negotiates a license with the best licensees
- Licensees develop concepts, prototypes and final production samples and submit for approval
- Licensor approves licensed products for sale
- Licensees sell licensed products to authorized retailers

Licensees expect that the license will provide them with sales growth. This sales growth may be in the form of growth within existing market or the opportunity to enter a new market. To achieve this, licensees expect that the brand they are licensing has significant brand preference, that it will open doors and ultimately help them meet or exceed their business objectives. The licensing contract forces the licensee to achieve certain sales targets and royalties; therefore, the goal of the licensee is to quickly meet their business objectives, thereby achieving their contract obligations. Royalties are the money paid to a licensor by the licensee for the right to use the licensed property. It is calculated by multiplying the Royalty Rate by the Net Sales.

== Global brand licensing industry ==
The main international professional association for brand licensing is the Licensing Industry Merchandiser's Association, which sponsors the annual Licensing International Expo.

Each Year, License! Global magazine publishes an annual list of "The Top 150 Global Licensors". For 2017, the leader was Disney Consumer Products with $53 billion in retail sales of licensed merchandise, followed by Meredith Corp. with $23.2 Billion and PVH with $18 Billion.

In 2001, worldwide character retail sales hit $38.5 billion, according to License! research.

According to the International Licensing Industry Merchandisers' Association (LIMA), global licensed merchandise sales was $272.2 billion in 2016, versus $262.2 billion in 2015.

In the fashion industry, branded perfumes and cosmetics are often produced under license. For example, L'Oreal Group holds the fragrance and beauty licenses for Yves Saint Laurent, Giorgio Armani, Valentino, Prada, Ralph Lauren, and more.

=== Brand licensing in South Korea ===
Han Chang-Wan, a professor at Sejong University, published the history of animation character design in Korea at the Character Licensing Fair 2016. This study became the first to have rabbit and turtle illustrations as Korean animated characters. This was revealed in The Independent newspaper.

With American and Japanese characters dominating the Korean animation industry until the 1970s, it was not until 1983 when Dooly the Little Dinosaur (아기 공룡 둘리) appeared in Bomulsum—a monthly magazine for kids—and changed the Korean character market. In 1987, Dooly the Little Dinosaur first aired as a six-part TV show, with another seven parts airing in 1988. In 1995, Kim Soo-jung, its creator, established a company named 'Dooly World' and went into the character design industry. The following year, the animated movie 'Dooly the Little Dinosaur' was released. In the 30 years since Dooly the Little Dinosaur launched, its related market generated 2–3 billion won per year (about 1.7–2.7 million dollars as of July 2018). This paved the way for the character market in Korea.
