= Underdog (2018 film) =

2018 film by Oh Sung-yoon and Lee Chun-baek

- Theatrical release poster
- Directed by: Oh Sung-yoon; Lee Chun-baek
- Screenplay by: Oh Sung-yoon
- Produced by: Oh Sung-yoon; Choi Yoon-kyung
- Starring: Doh Kyung-soo; Park So-dam; Park Chul-min
- Music by: Lee Ji-soo
- Production company: Odoltogi
- Distributed by: NEW; Mango Films
- Release dates: July 12, 2018 (BIFAN); January 16, 2019 (South Korea)
- Running time: 102 minutes
- Country: South Korea
- Language: Korean
- Box office: 7 million USD

Underdog (Korean: 언더독; RR: Eondeodok) (alternatively labelled as A Dog's Courage) is a 2018 animated adventure film about the story of a pack of abandoned dogs who journeyed to find a new home. The film is directed by Lee Chun-baek and Oh Sung-yoon and stars Doh Kyung-soo, Park So-dam and Park Chul-min. It was released in theaters on January 16, 2019.

The film opened the 22nd Bucheon International Fantastic Film Festival in July 2018. Tickets for the film were sold out in 9 seconds, setting a record for the shortest time for an opening film at the BIFAN to be sold in such time. It was also chosen to be screened in North Korea as the first act of the South Korea-North Korea film exchange program.

Underdog was featured in the Taiwanese Kaohsiung Film Festival in the Kids Fantasy section on October 20–21, 2018.

In March 2019, Underdog was featured in Tokyo Anime Award Festival, being the first Korean film to do so. In June 2019, Underdog was featured in Annecy International Animated Film Festival, being the only Korean animation film out of eight to do so.

== Plot ==
A blue and white collie dog named Moongchi is driven by his owner to a forest somewhere in North Korea where he is released and abandoned. He tries to follow his owner's truck, but is unable to reach it in time.

Moongchi waits for his owner to return. While waiting, he is discovered by a pack of stray dogs consisting of two Chihuahua mates wearing vests, a German Shepherd named Gaeko, and their leader, a small scruffy Shih Tzu named Jjangah. He feeds them his food after seeing them starving. They inform Moongchi that his owner won't return which he finds it hard to believe until the conversation is interrupted by a car parking nearby, leaving a scrawny crippled dog on the roadside before driving away. Moongchi is mortified and begins to lose hope as he believes that he too has been abandoned. The strays carry the new crippled dog with them into a human town; there, Moongchi encounters the local dogcatcher but makes a narrow escape with the help of another town stray dog named Bongji, who struggles to control his temper, and they return to the strays' home inside a dilapidated abandoned building. They discuss their living conditions with the dangers of the dog-hunter and Gaeko mentions a distant paradise they could travel to by scent, only to be shot down by Jjangah, who disproves of homes.

The following day, the strays travel to a nearby restaurant where a friendly chef is known to feed the dogs. There, Moongchi sees a human he mistakes for his owner and chases them into the restaurant only to be hastily driven from the building. When he explains to the dogs about it, they shake it down. That night, as Moongchi lies awake, the sickly crippled dog begins to move; she asks Moongchi to bring her to her parents before she collapses. The following morning, she is found to have passed away. The dogs bury her in the building's dirt yard along with the other past graves where they gather and mourn; Moongchi leaves to disown his tennis ball into a river, blaming himself for not helping the crippled dog sooner and believing he doesn't deserve it.

Moongchi witnesses a pack of wild dogs hunting a boar and running off into the mountains. The pack consists of a black dog named Bami, a pair named Shirley and Edward, and their son Trevin. They return to their den site where they discuss the recent lack of prey due to the humans and their fear of human settlements. That day, the town strays find out that the friendly chef was fired for attracting stray dogs and they are no longer welcome at the restaurant. Moongchi is blamed for this cause.

The next day, Moongchi goes to visit the wild dogs where he meets Trevin and follows him to their den site. He hopes to make friends with them with a bone as a gift, only to be told that town strays don't belong with wild dogs and gets sent back to town. That night, Bongji is captured by the dogcatcher and the stray town dogs again debate their living conditions. Gaeko mentions the potential paradise he vaguely remembers and Moongchi mentions living in the mountains like the wild dogs, but Jjangah chastises Moongchi's criticism of their lifestyle and refuses to trust him.

Moongchi runs off with hopes to impress the wild dogs by driving the goats from a human farm into the mountains for them to kill and eat, only for Edward to chastise him for endangering them by angering the humans. As Edward expected, the goat farmer calls the animal control services about the wild dogs, resulting in Moongchi and Trevin being captured and put into a pound. Moongchi is injected with a GPS tracking chip with the intentions on later using him to locate the other stray dogs. He has a dream where he sees his owner again.

Moongchi recalls his childhood in a puppy mill where he was separated from his mother and siblings to be sold in a pet store, where he was adopted by a family who were unaware of how large he would grow. He later wakes up. That night, Moongchi, Trevin and all of the other captive dogs are freed from the pound by the wild dogs. As they flee, they discuss their need for a new home and Moongchi recalls the paradise Gaeko mentions. The town strays' abandoned building is destroyed by human construction and they too need a new home. Together, they and the wild dogs agree to follow Gaeko to the land he remembers.

The dogs cross a highway, but Shirley and Edward are killed by a car collision. The dogs mourn them and Trevin had a breakdown, missing his sister and parents. The dogs find that the fields on the other side make the living grounds safe for them to rest in and successfully hunt a deer together. Bami tells Moongchi about her childhood in a puppy mill where the dogs are abused and disposed of and how her mother was taken when she became too ill; Bami was almost doomed to the same life but managed to escape, ending up with the wild dogs.

The dogs' newfound peace is short-lived as the dog-hunters find them using Moongchi's tracking device, but they narrowly escape in a wildfire. Moongchi saves Jjangah from drowning, winning his respect in the process, but at the same time, has lost some of his fur from the fire. Along their journey, they encounter a household of two friendly humans who rescue injured animals and have several crippled dogs. Moongchi attempts to leave the others due to suspecting the tracking chip in his neck but Bami refuses. They encounter the lead dog-hunter whom they defeat in a fight and leave in the middle of the forest, with the man ended up in a mine field with no way out. Jjangah decides that he will stay with the humans and they make their goodbyes before the dogs continue their journey.

The dogs arrive at the border of the Korean Demilitarized Zone and see the paradise they've been seeking on the other side of the barbed fence wall in South Korea. Gaeko recalls he was once a guard dog here. The stray dogs escape through the gate into the wilderness on the other side, except for Moongchi, who gets stuck behind. After being chased around by the military personnel, Moongchi leaps over the wall and escapes with the stray dogs into the peaceful, uninhabited wilderness. The film's end credits show that the dogs are living a happy life in their new home and Moongchi and Bami eventually having a litter of puppies, and it is revealed that Jjangah has started a family with his new mate as well.

== Voice cast ==
- Doh Kyung-soo as Moongchi (a Border Collie)
- Park So-dam as Bami (a wild dog)
- Park Chul-min as Jjangah (a Shih Tzu)
- Lee Jun-hyuk as Hunter
- Jeon Sook-kyung as Ari
- Yeon Ji-won as Tari
- Kang Seok as Gaeko (a German Shepherd)
- Park Joong-geum as Cari
- Tak Won-jung as Bongji

== Production ==
Director Oh Sung-yoon had previously directed the animated film Leafie, A Hen into the Wild (2011). The production of Underdog started in April 2013 and ended in June 2018. Dubbing began in January 2016.

== Original soundtrack ==
Underdog OST

Soundtrack album by Various Artists
- Released: January 15, 2019
- Recorded: May 2018 in the Dvořák Hall, Rudolfinum
- Genre: Soundtrack
- Length: 49:01
- Language: Korean
- Label: MUSIC&NEW

No.	Title	Lyrics	Music	Artist	Length
1.	"Abandoned Dog" (버려진 개)	Lee Ji-soo	Lee Ji-soo	Lee Ji-soo	2:48
2.	"Mungchi's Determination" (뭉치의 결심)	Lee Ji-soo	Lee Ji-soo	Lee Ji-soo	2:52
3.	"Black Goat Farm" (흑염소 농장)	Seo Ye-ji	Seo Ye-ji	Lee Ji-soo; Seo Ye-ji	3:32
4.	"Escape from the Cage" (개 공장에서의 탈출)	Lee Ji-soo	Lee Ji-soo	Lee Ji-soo	4:22
5.	"The Journey of Dogs I" (개들의 여정 I)	Lee Ji-soo	Lee Ji-soo	Lee Ji-soo	2:29
6.	"Accident and Death" (자유로 사고)	Lee Ji-soo	Lee Ji-soo	Lee Ji-soo	2:49
7.	"The Recollection of Bami" (밤이의 회상)	Lee Ji-soo	Lee Ji-soo	Lee Ji-soo	2:11
8.	"Fighting with Hounds" (사냥개들과의 싸움)	Kim Jin-hwan	Kim Jin-hwan	Lee Ji-soo; Kim Jin-hwan	3:49
9.	"Escape from the Fire" (불 속에서의 탈출)	Lee Ji-soo	Lee Ji-soo	Lee Ji-soo	2:28
10.	"The Journey of Dogs II" (개들의 여정 II)	Lee Ji-soo	Lee Ji-soo	Lee Ji-soo	3:43
11.	"Hunter's Chase" (사냥꾼의 추격)	Lee Ji-soo	Lee Ji-soo	Lee Ji-soo	4:38
12.	"Finally We Arrive There" (마침내 그곳으로)	Lee Ji-soo	Lee Ji-soo	Lee Ji-soo	1:48
13.	"Cross the 'DMZ'" ('DMZ'를 넘어)	Lee Ji-soo	Lee Ji-soo	Lee Ji-soo	3:55
14.	"Dreaming Place" (꿈꾸는 그곳)	17Holic; Jang So-hee	Lee Ji-soo	Kim So-hee	3:50
15.	"Dreaming Place" (꿈꾸는 그곳) (Inst.)		Lee Ji-soo		3:47
Total length:					49:01

== Release ==
Before its premiere, Underdog was sold to 69 territories including France, United States, Canada, Hong Kong, Malaysia, Singapore and Indonesia.

=== Promotion ===
On January 7, 2018, directors Oh Sung-yoon and Lee Chun-baek and voice actors Doh Kyung-soo, Park So-dam and Lee Jun-hyuk attended the film's preview at CGV Yongsan I'park Mall. On January 15, 2018, the directors and voice actors held a showcase for the film at Lotte Cinema World Tower.

Underdog has also opened a funding for rescuing abandoned animals. Donators were rewarded with figurine and dolls of the main characters Moongchi and Bami.

== Reception ==
=== Awards and nominations ===
Year	Award	Category	Recipient	Result	Ref
2018	Golden Silk Road Media Awards	Best Animated Feature Film	Underdog	Won	
2019	Seoul International Cartoon & Animation Festival	Special Award	Underdog	Won	

== See also ==
- South Korean animation
- List of Korean animated films
