= Kim Su-jeong =

Kim Su-jeong or Kim Su-jŏng (김수정) may refer to:

- Kim Soo-jung (born 1950), South Korean animator
- Kim Su-jong (born 2000), North Korean artistic gymnast
- Kim Su-jung (born 2004), South Korean actress
- Kim Su-jeong (field hockey) (born 1974), South Korean hockey player
