= Angelo Oddi =

Angelo Oddi is a Canadian composer, songwriter, and producer.

== Biography ==
Oddi was born in Toronto, Ontario, Canada. He attended Chaminade Secondary School, and received a degree in Music Composition and Psychology at York University in Toronto.

=== Career ===
Oddi has written music for the television programs Sesame Street, Fugget About It, Hi Opie!, The Colossal Failure of the Modern Relationship, Baxter, Overruled! (Family/ Disney), Hammerboy, Ice Storm: The Sale and Pelletier Affair, (CTV/Teletoon), Taste Buds (TVO).

Oddi was nominated for a Regional Emmy Award (Nashville Chapter) for music he composed for the television series The Big Comfy Couch for Radical Sheep Productions, Amity Entertainment, Owl Television, Owl Communications and Tadpole Kids.

In 2008, Oddi produced and wrote songs for the children's CD This Is Daniel Cook. Here We Are! for The Children's Group and marblemedia.

In 2010, Oddi composed the theme, songs and scored the television series Baxter produced by Shaftesbury Films for Family Channel.
