= Taiwanese animation =

Animation of Taiwan

Taiwanese animation or Taiwanese donghua can be traced back to 1954's black-and-white animation Wu Song Fights the Tiger (武松打虎) by the Kuei Brothers but the earliest surviving is The Race Between Turtle and Rabbit (龜兔賽跑) produced at the end of the 1960s by the Kuangchi Program Service and was also the first color animation in Taiwan. In the 1970s, Taiwanese animators went abroad to study the animation production techniques in the United States and Japan, opening up Taiwan's OEM animation and homemade industry.

== 1950s and 1960s ==
In the 1950s and 1960s, Taiwanese leisure activities were primarily watching film, television, folk opera and glove puppetry. Although American cartoons were broadcast in Taiwan, it was generally perceived to be detrimental to students' studies and increased risk of dropping out, however there were already some Taiwanese experimenting with making short length animations. In 1961, Fr. Philip L. Bourett, S.J. (卜立輝神父) founded the Kuangchi Program Service (KPS) and began the development of Taiwan's multimedia industry by purchasing used animation equipment from the United States, this could be considered the formal beginnings of Taiwanese animation.

In 1963, Fr. Bourret recommended Linus Zao (趙澤修 Chao Tse-hsiu / Zhao Zexiu) to be trained in animation at Disney in Hollywood. Linus had previously worked at Toei Animation from 1959. Upon Linus's return to Taiwan in 1965, the animation department at KPS was established. The first production was Uncle Stone's Letter (石頭伯的信) in 1968 followed by The Tortoise and the Hare in 1969. This won him a Golden Horse Award and he was given the honorary title of "Father of Taiwanese Animation" and the nickname "Taiwan's Walt Disney" In 1970, due to financial factors, the animation department was shut down and Linus left KPS. He went on to found his very own animation studio, Linus Art Studio (澤修美術製作所), and continued to produce commercials and social education films, this was one of Taiwan's early institutions specializing in cultivating animation talent, but all operations ceased after Linus moved to Hawaii in 1971 to take up a position at the University of Hawaii where he taught and worked as a freelance painter until 2003.

== 1970s ==
Japanese animation developed at a rapid pace between 1962 and 1970, so much so that Toei in Japan built a new film factory specifically for TV animation. With such rapid development gave rise to the problem of increased production costs so Japanese companies looked overseas to foreign animation companies to take over production work.

In 1970, Ying Jen Cartoon Production Center (影人卡通製作中心) was set up, consisting of twelve animators. Japanese animators Kusube Daikichirou (楠部大吉郎), Tsutomu Shibayama, and Otsuka Yasuo went to Taipei to work with Ying Jen, who were in charge of subcontracting Japanese animation, while the original art were all drawn by the Japanese original artists. All tools such as rulers, pens, and celluloid were strictly imported from Japan. Animations such as Star of the Giants and The Oriental Witches (東洋の魔女) were produced by Ying Jen Cartoons. However, after a little over a year, the Republic of China and Japan severed diplomatic relations, in addition, the salary of an animation artist at the time was not sufficient to live on (One animation page was worth three NTD), hence Ying Jen declared its dissolution.

In 1971, Teng You-li (鄧有立), who would later be named in 1975 as one of the Republic of China Ten Outstanding Young Persons (中華民國十大傑出青年), hired several animation artists from Ying Jen and founded Chinese Cartoon Production. But Teng decided to go a different route than Ying Jen by making homemade animation. In 1972, New Journey to the West (新西遊記), an experimental film directed by Chu Ming-tsan (朱明燦) was released and reported about by TTV, CTV and other cable television networks and print media. The news reached the ear of South Sea Film & Co (香港南海影業公司) director Chang Ying (張英), who discussed working with Chinese Cartoon Production and decided to fund the making of the animated film Creation of the Gods.

When making Creation of the Gods (封神榜), Chinese cartoon production were still in the stages of exploring screenwriting and character design. Although they invited Hong Kong screenwriter San Gong-seh (申江寫) to write the script, San wrote plays for movies and did not understand the nature of animation, the script become too large. Although they seized the opportunity of Bruce Lee's passing by adding wuxia and kung fu elements, the box office performance was not good. Fred Tan (但漢章, Tan Han-chung) once critiqued: "Children don't understand it and adults aren't willing to watch it" (小孩子看不懂、大人不願意看).

In 1979, Tsai Ming-chin (蔡明欽) served as one of the directors for the Chinese Cartoon Production and Toei collaboration animated film Romance of the Three Kingdoms. The film won the award for Best Cartoon at the 1980 Golden Horse Film Festival and Awards but performed poorly at the box office. There were no computer special effects at the time and it was quite a feat to animate the large scale battle scenes.

In 1974, Linus Zao's protégé Huang Mu-tsun (黃木村) founded China Youth Animation Development Company (中國青年動畫開發公司), abbreviated to Chung Ching (中青 Zhongqing), which mainly produced animated social education works. In 1977, Before It Rains (未雨綢繆) whose theme is family planning, won the 14th Golden Horse Award for Best Cartoon, which was the first ever awarded to an animated film.

In 1974, Tsai Chih-chung (蔡志忠) directed the animated title sequence for the TV series, The Stupid Son-in-law (傻女婿), this was the first in Taiwan.

== 1980s ==
In 1978, James Wang who had returned to Taiwan after studying abroad in the United States, founded Wang Film Productions, which focused on accepting outsourced orders from American production companies such as Hanna-Barbera and Disney. Through its use of American corporate management methods and hiring of concept artists at high prices, it became the world's largest subcontracted animation production center in the world by export volume; at the same time it killed off smaller animation companies that could not compete. Wang Film Productions and Ying Jen had deeply influenced Taiwanese animation though the introduction of American and Japanese animation respectively.

Original animation in the 1970s mostly derived from adaptations of traditional Chinese stories, however in the 1980s Taiwanese animation turned to adapting best-selling manhua, an example is Far East Cartoon's adaptation of the Hong Kong comic directed by Joseph Wong Chak and 謝金塗 (Che Gam-Tiu/Tse Cham To/Hsieh Chin-tu) called Old Master Q. It was adapted from the four panel style comic and in addition to its funny plots, it incorporated showdown duels of Bruce Lee, the blind swordsman (Zatoichi), and Ore wa Teppei. It was a big success at the box office in both Hong Kong and Taiwan with turnover in excess of 100 million NTD. It won the Best Cartoon award at the 18th Golden Horse Awards in 1981.

In 1983, Far East Cartoon adapted Ao You-hsiang's (敖幼祥) four panel comic Messy Temple (烏龍院) for the big screen and directed by Tsai Chih-chung. But due to quality issues by its partner company, the finished work was very flawed and compounded by the lack of introducing fresh new story plots, it did not perform well at the box office and subsequently the popularity of manhua adaptations quickly faded. Wang Film Productions's adaptation of Brother Ox Cartoons' (牛哥漫畫) Uncle Niou's Great Adventure (牛伯伯牛小妹大破鑽石黨), directed by Yu Wei-cheng (余為政), was the last of the wave in popularity of manhua adaptation. It was not shown on the big screen.

Unlike adapting traditional stories, there were problems of character design when adapting manhua. Often audience would lose interest if the character design differed too much from the original or if there is a change in style of drawing. Funding and scripts were also problems that plagued Taiwanese animation. In 1983, although Uncle Ox (牛伯伯) was nominated for a Golden Horse award in 1981, the last best cartoon award went to Bremen 4: Angels in Hell (四神奇, Japanese: ブレーメン4 地獄の中の天使たち) produced by Tai Wei Cartoon (泰威公司) in collaboration with Osamu Tezuka. This also led to the decline in homemade Taiwanese animation.

After the mid-1980s, Taiwan's animation industry largely depended upon American subcontracting to support it. Initially, TV animation was undertaken then gradually Disney animated films. At this time Taiwan's subcontracted animation industry had surprisingly matured: by 1987, when Wang Film Productions opened a new building, they were producing as many as 170 to 190 works yearly and hired over one hundred concept artists. Due to its staggering output and efficiency, Wang Film Productions was nicknamed the "Magic Cuckoo's Nest" by Hollywood.

Although Taiwan's subcontracted animation industry underwent amazing development, this was a time when much of American and Japanese subcontracted animations were rapidly dumped back in Taiwan. Foreign animation eroded the original animation market so much so that there was hardly any homemade animations on any television channels in Taiwan.

Non-celluloid animations include Cheng Chen-yi's (張振益) Impression from My Childhood (兒時印象) in 1985 and the clay animation Cat Hiding (躲貓貓) in 1987. There is also Broadcast Development Foundation's (廣電基金會) Grandfather's Stories (阿公講古) and Li Han-wen's (李漢文) and David Tao Sr.'s (陶大偉) collaborative paper carving animation work The Adventures of Little Calabash (小葫蘆歷險記). However, these animations were not combined with any business models.

== 1990s ==
In the early 1990s, Taiwan's economy picked up, the New Taiwan Dollar was gaining value and wages were on the rise, these factors steadily increased production costs of the subcontract industry. To reduce costs, animation subcontract factories were set up and relocated to mainland China and Southeast Asia. In 1989, Sam Wang (王亞泉)/Wang Yaquan founded Morning Sun Animation (朝陽動畫), the first Taiwanese animation company founded on the mainland.

As the subcontract industry relocated abroad, Taiwan's animation industry gradually geared towards creativity and research and development to survive. In the 1990s, the information bureau used funds to subsidize several feature-length animation works, including Far East's Tsai Chih-chung's original work Zen Taipei Ah-Kuan (禪說阿寬) directed by You Jing-Yuan (游景源). Animation and coloring were produced on the mainland while directing, original concept and editing were all produced in Taiwan, although its box office performance did not fair too well, videotape sales did, and it won the Special Jury Award (金馬獎評審特別獎) at the 31st Golden Horse award.

In 1998, Grandma and Her Ghosts (魔法阿媽), directed by Wang Hsiao-ti (王小棣) and with South Korean collaboration, used the theme of Taiwanese local customs and folk beliefs which resonated with the Taiwanese community and was recognized for Best Film at the 1st Taipei Film Festival, but because the Gold Horse Award judges deemed the film's plot to be outlandish, the film missed out on Best animated film award at the 35th Gold Horse Award.

Also in 1998, Kang Chin-Ho (康進和) directed Kavalan (少年噶瑪蘭), funded by PTS and filmed by Wang Film Productions, the theme is an aborigine tale handed down in the Kabalan Plain, describing the protagonist transcending space and time to return to the plain in olden times. The art design was not bad but due to a lack of understanding of Taiwanese aborigine culture, the animation was not well valued by the aborigines.

Apart from homemade films, Taiwanese animation also sought collaboration with other countries. In 1994, in preparation for public broadcast, NHK and South Korea's KBS funded the production of Confucius (孔子傳), but due to a decree and various factors, it was not shown in the cinemas; In 1995, Lin Cheng-te's manhua Young Guns was adapted and made into two sets of OVAs using the methods from their collaboration with the Japanese, and sold pretty well in retail market.

In 1995, the feature-length American 3D animation Toy Story had a great impact on the animation industry. At the same time Taiwan's 3D animation short The Sky of Little-Sun (小陽光的天空) directed by Cheng Fen-Fen (鄭芬芬) and produced by the Sunshine Social Welfare Foundation had just been completed, the story follows the story between an ordinary girl and girl with burns; at this time Wang Film Productions also entered into the 3D animation subcontracting industry.

== 2000s ==
The wave of digitization was sweeping the world and animation was no exception. Globalization and creativity became increasingly important to animation production. In view of the success of South Korea's government subsidized internet gaming and digital animation industries, the Taiwanese government set up the Digital Content Institute (數位內容學院) in 2003 to encourage the development of Taiwan's digital gaming and animation industries.

In 1989, Chen Keng-pin (陳耿彬), the original artist of Far East Cartoon's Old Master Q, set up David Images Company (大衛數位藝術公司) and introduced a full set of American 3D equipment and produced Taiwan's first 3D animation commercial Kolin thousand dollar ant transformer (歌林千元變身螞蟻), Tatung Space Baby (大同太空寶寶篇), etc., and cooperated with film director Ting Shan-hsi (丁善璽) in 1993 to produce Taiwan's first action film with 3D CGI, The Magic Sword (將邪神劍) and marked the beginning of Taiwan's 3D animation.

Towards the end of the 1990s, Spring House Entertainment Technology (春水堂科技) produced an online animation titled A-Kuei (阿貴) which was very successful. In 2002 it was adapted into the feature-length animation A-Kuei's Gonna Hammer You (阿貴槌你喔), which was the first digital animation to receive government subsidy and the first Flash animation to appear on the big screen. Other notable digital animations are Butterfly Lovers: Liang Shanbo and Zhu Yingtai (蝴蝶夢-梁山伯與祝英台) in 2003 and Wang Film Productions's Fire Ball (紅孩兒：決戰火焰山) in 2005, both combining traditional Chinese fables with 3D animation.

Animation in the 2000s, aside from simple productions, also needed to solve the problems of script writing, marketing, and globalization, which cannot be solved just by training animation artists. As a result, several animation companies actively sought international collaboration, to absorb the internationally successful business model and seize the opportunity for expansion.

"Huei Yu? (no English equivalent)" (會宇多媒體股份有限公司) produced The Kids' Ten Commandments (兒童十誡) targeted at the European and North American market in collaboration with Mondo Media. In 2004, the TV animation Pandamonium was broadcast in Taiwan, Japan, mainland China, Europe, United States, South Korea, etc. They also experimented with selling merchandise through trade partnership with companies in other industries to increase revenue. In summer of 2007, Matsu: Legend of the Sea (海之傳說－媽祖) was produced by Chinese Cartoon Production (中華卡通) in collaboration with Dajia Jenn Lann Temple to release merchandise and do publicity. In this way, the business model of Taiwanese model gradually matured.

In 2007, early 2D subcontract factory Far Eastern Cartoons (遠東卡通公司) last owned by Kao Chin-yuan (高錦源) was not operating too well and the decision was made to quit the subcontracting business and set up a new company using the old name Far Eastern (遠東) but adding on Animation Tech (動畫科技). Far Eastern Animation Tech set up an office in Beijing which focused on a new development angle between multimedia businesses and animation production. This was also the first instance of a Taiwanese animation company officially collaborating with a mainland Chinese company, the Beijing-based Songlei Culture Group (松雷文化集團) whose office operations focused on the creation and production of original animation, cellphone and digital content and established a flagship store for Creative Culture Products (文化創意商品) at the Forbidden City in Beijing. This collaboration allowed the support and exchanges with mainland China's official institution on copyright trading, Beijing Film Academy and Bright China Foundation (光華基金會).

In 2009, the 44th Golden Bell Awards introduced the Best Animation Programme category which has been awarded every year since.

== 2010s ==
With the rise of digital media after 2010, 3D animation, visual effects, and digital media were being promoted as universities set up relevant departments to cultivate new talent. More independent studios began to actively invest in developing homemade animation.

In these years some notable Taiwanese animated cinematic productions were Venerable Jian-Zhen (鑑真大和尚) in 2010, Memory Loss (憶世界大冒險) in 2011, Silent Code (BBS鄉民的正義) in 2012, Mida (夢見), A Little Bird (我是隻小小鳥) in 2013, Barion (重甲機神 Baryon) in 2016.

== Directors ==
The following are well known animation directors who produced feature-length animated films and animated television programs since the 1990s.

- Wang Ya-chuan (王亞泉 Wang Yaquan)
- Wang Hsiao-ti (王小棣 Wang Xiaodi)
- Shih Chang-chieh (石昌杰 Shi Changjie)
- Lin Po-liang (林博良 Lin Boliang)
- Wang Tung (王童 Wang Tong)
- Chiu Li-wei (邱立偉 Qiu Liwei)
- Yang Shao-chang (楊紹昌 Yang Shaochang)
- Wang Shih-wei (王世偉 Wang Shiwei)
- Tsai Ming-chin (蔡明欽 Cai Mingqin)
- Bunny Lin (林世仁 Lin Shih-jen / Lin Shiren)
- Chu Chi (朱騏 Zhu Qi)
- Jerry Lee (李春永 Lee Chun-yung / Li Chunyong)
- Oscar Lin (林明杰 Lin Ming-chieh / Lin Mingjie)
- Tsai Chih-chung (蔡志忠 Cai Zhizhong)

Other directors

- Chi Po-chou (紀柏舟Ji Bozhou)
- Tsai Jhih-wei (蔡至維 Cai Zhiwei)
- Chiu Yi-hsun (邱奕勳 Qiu Yixun): Magical Painting (神畫)

== See also ==
- Anime
- Chinese animation
- Dongman
- Korean animation
- Manhua
