= Gomsin =

Traditional Korean women's shoe

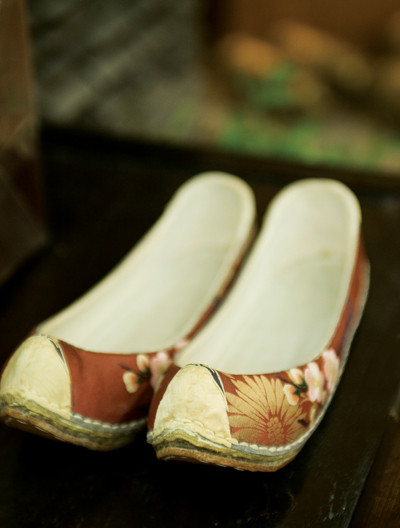
women's gomusin

Gomsin (Korean: 곰신) is a South Korean term for a young Korean woman who is waiting for their boyfriend to return from their two-year compulsory military service. The term is an abbreviation of gomusin, traditional Korean rubber shoes. This in turn is a reference to the phrase "putting on gomusin backwards" (Korean: 고무신을 거꾸로 신었다), which is a euphemism for being dumped while in the military. It is common to find gomsin among Korean women who are between twenty and thirty years old.

"Wearing gomsin" or "putting on gomsin" is slang widely used online in Korea. There are terms to describe men, such as "combat boots". When a girlfriend remains devoted to her boyfriend throughout his service, they may be called "wearing kkotsin." Kkotsin are a type of flower shoe.

== Gomusin ==
Gomusin (Korean pronunciation: [komuɕʰin]) are shoes made of rubber, built in the form of traditional Korean shoes. The shoes are wide with low heels. Gomusin for men were modeled after "gatsin" (갖신), and ones for women were danghye (당혜). Gomusin first appeared in the early 20th century; they were easier to keep clean than danghye and jipsin (straw shoes) and they could be worn when during wet weather, attracting popularity and replacing traditional footwear.

=== Putting gomusin on backwards ===
The term "putting gomusin on backwards" when applied to a couple, refers to the termination of their relationship because the girlfriend chose to pursue other men during the boyfriend's military service. This expression originated from an old Korean tale in which a wife has an affair during her husband's absence while fighting in the Korean War. After the war, the husband returns to find his wife in bed with her lover. In her shock, she runs out quickly, putting her gomsuin on backwards. This expression has been compared to the English metaphor, "writing a Dear John letter".

== Online community ==
In modern Korean society, there are many communies for gomsin, where users may commiserate with each other and share tips for enduring the long waits.
