= Closers: Side Blacklambs =

2016–2019 South Korean television series

- Hangul: 클로저스
- RR: Keullojeoseu
- MR: K'ŭllojŏsŭ
- Genre: Web animation
- Based on: Closers by Naddic Games
- Developed by: Studio Animal
- Written by: Cha Mujin
- Directed by: Gu Bonghoe
- Creative director: Nexon
- Theme music composer: Opening theme: Ye Eunsu; Ending theme: Gang Minhun
- Opening theme: Close the World
- Ending theme: Close to Your Side
- Country of origin: South Korea
- Original language: Korean
- No. of episodes: 6

Production
- Executive producers: Manager of production: Jo Gyeonghun; Gim Daesu; Hwang Jeonghyeon; Character design and drawing director: Yu Changhui; Jo Yeonju
- Producers: Art director: Gim Yongsuk; Jo Yeonju; Director of photography: Song Miyeon; Music director: Yi Pieona; Sound director: Gim Huijip
- Editor

Original release
- Network: YouTube
- Release: December 23, 2016

Closers: Side Blacklambs (Korean: 클로저스) is an aeni based on South Korean online game Closers.

== Episodes ==
No.	Official English title (Original Korean title)	Original air date	Note
1	"Start Team Black Lambs" "Sijak, Geomeunyang Tim" (시작, 검은양 팀)	December 23, 2016	
2	"What's More Important" "Boda Jungyohan Geot" (보다 중요한 것)	February 2, 2018	
3	"Past & Present" "Gwageowa Hyeonjae" (과거와 현재)	December 21, 2018	
4	"Be Together" "Hamkke Handaneun Geot" (함께 한다는 것)	December 28, 2018	
5	"Gospel Singer" "Bog-Eum-Eul Malhaneun Ja" (복음을 말하는 자)	January 4, 2019	
6	"Solidarity and Understanding" "Gyeolsoggwa Ihae" (결속과 이해)	January 11, 2019	

== See also ==
- Aeni
