= Tiger Coming In =

South Korean webtoon

- Manhwa cover of Tiger Coming In vol. 1

호랑이 들어와요 Horangi deureowayo
- Genre: Comedy
- Author: Se-Hyeok Bae
- Illustrator: Damu
- Webtoon service: Naver Webtoon (Korean)
- Original run: October 26, 2020 – January 8, 2024
- Volumes: 10

Tiger Coming In (Korean: 호랑이 들어와요) is a South Korean manhwa released as a webtoon written by Se-Hyeok Bae and illustrated by Damu. It was serialized via Naver Corporation's webtoon platform, Naver Webtoon, from October 2020 to January 2024, with the individual chapters collected and published into 10 volumes. An aeni series adaptation produced by Studio YoungWon has been announced and was released on July 25, 2024, on Laftel, total 8 Episodes.

== Characters ==
- Ranga (랑아; Korean: Jang Mi)
- Hoya (호야; Korean: Yi Sae-ah)
- Dad (아빠; Korean: Lee Ho-san)
- Mom (엄마; Korean: Lee Ji-hyeon)
- Heo Chan (허찬; Korean: Nam Doh-hyeong)
- Geumran (금란; Korean: Lee Serena)

== Media ==
=== Manhwa ===
Se-Hyeok Bae launched Tiger Coming In in Naver's webtoon platform Naver Webtoon on October 26, 2020, and concluded its first season on January 4, 2022; its second season began on April 26, 2022, to the conclusion on November 14, 2023; its third season began on November 21, 2023, to January 8, 2024, comprising a total of 150 chapters.

==== Volumes ====
| No. | Korean release date | Korean ISBN |
|---|---|---|
| 1 | August 30, 2021 | 979-1-16-769005-0 |
| 2 | March 15, 2022 | 979-1-16-769057-9 |
| 3 | August 25, 2022 | 979-1-16-769080-7 |
| 4 | February 10, 2023 | 979-1-16-769179-8 |
| 5 | December 10, 2023 | 979-1-16-769274-0 |
| 6 | April 25, 2024 | 979-1-16-769302-0 |
| 7 | August 25, 2024 | 979-1-16-769331-0 |
| 8 | December 10, 2024 | 979-1-16-769357-0 |
| 9 | April 25, 2025 | 979-1-16769388-4 |
| 10 | December 15, 2025 | 979-1-16769411-9 |

=== Aeni ===
An aeni series adaptation produced by Studio YoungWon has been announced and was released on July 25, 2024, on Laftel, total 8 episodes.
