= Gomusin =

20th century Korean rubber shoes

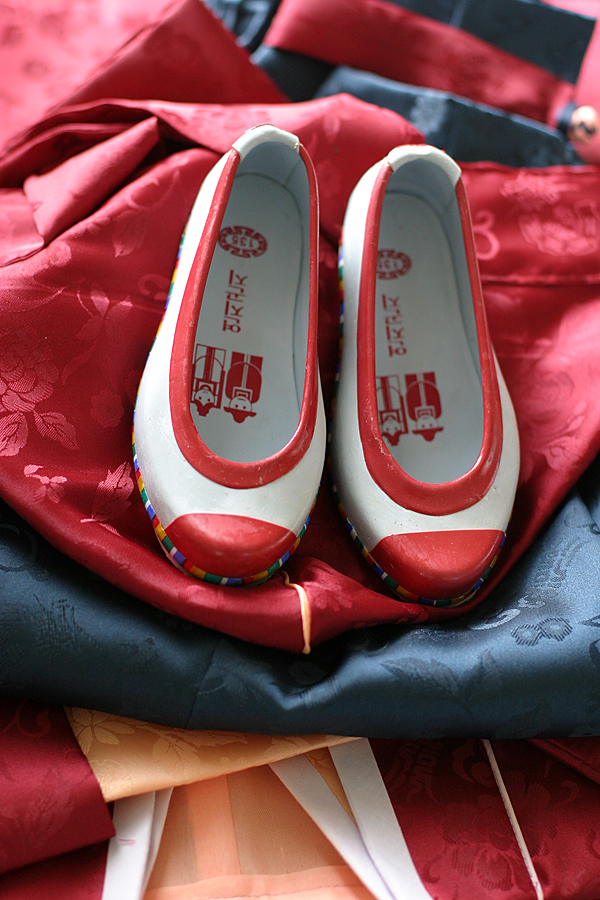

Korean name
- Hangul: 고무신
- RR: gomusin
- MR: komusin

Gomusin (Korean: 고무신; pronounced [komuɕʰin]) are traditional Korean shoes made of rubber. The shoes are wide, with low heels. Gomusin for men were modeled after gatsin, and ones for women were danghye. Gomusin first appeared in the early 20th century. They were much easier to keep clean than danghye and jipsin (straw shoes) and they could be worn when it rains. Therefore, gomusin gained a popularity and replaced traditional shoes.

== History ==
It is purported that the first man to wear gomusin was Sunjong of Korea, the last emperor of Joseon. From 1938 to 1945, the Japanese colonial régime restricted the wearing of national dress including gomusin. From 1945 to the end of the Korean War the now legalized shoes became very popular. After 1960, while the manufacture of gomusin became more sophisticated and more appealing styles were able to proliferate, gomusin became less common in everyday dress.

Gomusin are made by mixing rubber, leather, and cloth. This is likely the cause of their decline in popularity: they are relatively heavy and unergonomic, making them uncomfortable to wear for extended periods of time.

== See also ==
- Gomsin
- Hwa
- Jipsin
- Hanbok
- List of Korean clothing
- List of shoe styles
- Black Rubber Shoes
