= Hammerboy =

2003 South Korean animated film

- Promotional poster
- Directed by: Ahn Tae-geun
- Written by: Ahn Cheol-woo; Choi Jeong-woon; Kim Min-jo; Lee Seo-kyeong
- Based on: Hammerboy by Huh Young-man
- Produced by: Lee Dong-ki; Yang Ji-hye
- Starring: Kim Seo-young
- Music by: Angelo Oddi
- Distributed by: Sponge
- Release dates: August 20, 2003 (Big Apple Anime Fest); August 6, 2004 (South Korea)
- Running time: 80 minutes
- Country: South Korea
- Language: Korean
- Budget: $2 million

Hammerboy (Korean: 망치; RR: Mangchi) is a 2003 South Korean animated film. Based on the manhwa of the same name by Huh Young-man, it premiered at the Big Apple Anime Fest on August 30, 2003, before a theatrical release in South Korea on August 6, 2004. It was released in North America on DVD by Central Park Media in 2007, with the original Korean track and an English dub.

== Plot ==
The story is about a boy called Mangchi. He is small, but he possesses a magical hammer that helps him get around all his problems. He therefore got the nickname of "Hammerboy". Mangchi lives on a small distant island called Candlestick because everywhere else has turned into a wasteland because of some big catastrophe. When princess Poplar from the kingdom of Jemius is being pursued by henchmen of the conspirator Moonk, Hammerboy sides with her, ready to unleash all his latent powers in order to save humankind.

== See also ==
- List of Korean animated films
- List of animated feature-length films
