= Tomb Raider King =

South Korean web novel series

- First webtoon adaptation volume cover, featuring Seo Joo-Heon
- Author: Sanji Jiksong
- Country: South Korea
- Language: Korean
- Genre: Action, fantasy
- Publisher: New Episode; Wuxiaworld (English)
- Published: November 1, 2016 – May 4, 2018
- Media type: web novel

Tomb Raider King

도굴왕 RR: Dogurwang MR: Togurwang
- Author: Sanji Jiksong
- Illustrator: 3B2S
- Publisher: Redice Studio
- Webtoon service: KakaoPage (South Korea); Tapas (English); Yen Press (English)
- Original run: June 30, 2019 – March 27, 2023
- Volumes: 12

Tomb Raider King
- Written by: Woo Seung-wook
- Directed by: Woo Seung-wook
- Composer: Kim Ju-young
- No. of episodes: 12

Production
- Production company: Studio EEK

Original release
- Network: Aniplus (Korea); Fuji TV (B8station), Kansai TV, Tōkai TV, BS Fuji, UHB (Japan)
- Release: July 9 – September 30, 2026
- Network: Crunchyroll (streaming)

Tomb Raider King (Korean: 도굴왕) is a South Korean web novel written by Sanji Jiksong. It was serialized in Kakao's digital comic and fiction platform KakaoPage beginning on November 1, 2016. A webtoon adaptation of Tomb Raider King was first serialized in KakaoPage on June 30, 2019, with the webtoon's first season concluded on January 30, 2023, followed by its second season, which was released from February to March 2023. During their panel at Anime Expo 2022, Yen Press announced that they licensed the manhwa in English under their Ize Press imprint. Its individual chapters have been collected and published in twelve volumes by Redice Studio, as of August 2024.

An aeni television series adaptation produced by Studio EEK aired in Korea and Japan from July to September 2026.

== Plot ==
The tombs have been appearing all over the world, unbeknownst to mankind the tombs contain relics that grant powers to those who use it. Tomb raider Seo Joo-Heon, returns 15 years into the past and embarks on a journey around the world to steal all the tombs before anyone gets them.

== Characters ==
=== Main ===
Seo Joo-Heon
Voiced by: Hwang Chang-young, Yoshimasa Hosoya (Japanese), Monty Thompson (English)
The main protagonist of the series. Joo-Heon nearly died in present while stealing the tombs that were appearing all around the world. He returns 15 years into the past to steal all the tombs and get revenge on those who betrayed him. He is aware of Irene being in love with him, but initially avoids her.
Irene Holton
Voiced by: Lee Yuri, Saori Hayami (Japanese), Natalie Van Sistine (English)
An American from a rich, wealthy family. She had a relic that causes bad luck to those who come in contact with her, when Joo-Heon breaks her free from the relic she was able to return to her original self and even develops romantic feelings for him. However, her feelings are completely one-sided, as Joo-Heon does not initially like her. In the original timeline, she was a member of Pandora and became the queen of Bankruptcy after her family was killed.
Lee Seol-Ah
Joo-Heon's ex-girlfriend and the scout of his team. In the new timeline, she works for the China-Russia excavation team under Chaewon Jin before regaining her memories and rejoining Joo-Heon's team. Seol-Ah uses a relic to summon ghosts.
Yoo Jae-Ha
Voiced by: Shim Ki-hyuk, Miyu Irino (Japanese), Tyler Viator (English)
The restoration specialist of Joo-Heon's team. He became the King of Fraud after his art style was plagiarized by his professor, Gene Richard. In the new timeline, Joo-Heon convinces him to work for him again in exchange for help in exposing Gene Richard. Unlike his other teammates, Joo-Heon decides not to restore his memories in order to prevent him from becoming the King of Fraud again. Eventually, Jae-Ha regains his memories, but does not revert to his original personality. He uses the relics of Antonio Salieri and Leonardo da Vinci.
Oh Seug-Woo
Voiced by: Jin Yang-wook, Nobuhiko Okamoto (Japanese), Chase Kloza (English)
A former art and drug dealer, Joo-Heon coerces him and his gang to work for him as gardeners for the Tree of Life relic.
Julian Miller
Voiced by: Kim Seong-Eun, Kōseki Kogure (Japanese), Charles Nguyen (English)
Joo-Heon's lieutenant and the strategist of their team. In the new timeline, he works as an independent excavator and often butts heads with Joo-Heon over the use of relics before regaining his memories and rejoining Joo-Heon's team. Julian uses the relics of Zhuge Liang and Indra.
Chloe Laurent
The medic of Joo-Heon's team. In the new timeline, she works for Noah, an anti-relic terrorist group, before regaining her memories and rejoining Joo-Heon's team. Chloe uses the relic of Florence Nightingale.
Ilya Volgof
The clean-up specialist of Joo-Heon's team. He alters the memories of bystanders after excavations to ensure their team doesn't get in trouble. In the new timeline, Ilya works for Kwon Hyuk Soo before regaining his memories and rejoining Joo-Heon's team. He use the relics of Solomon and Sigmund Freud.
Im Hae Jin
The hunter of Joo-Heon's team. He became a ferocious warrior after the death of his wife and daughter. In the new timeline, his daughter is still alive and he works as a butcher before being framed for murder by TKBM. Joo-Heon clears his name and recruits him, but decides not to restore his memories. Eventually, he regains his memories after training to use relics again.
June
A support member of Joo-Heon's team and the human identity of the cradle of annhilation relic. Unlike Joo-Heon's other teammates, June is not in the new timeline and is found much later then the rest.
Crow
Voiced by: Sayaka Kinoshita (Japanese), Cassie Ewulu (English)
An imprisoned secret treasure relic, they take an interest in Joo-Heon and send him back in time to claim the relics for himself.
George Holton
Voiced by: Seiji Kato (Japanese)
Irene's older brother. He infiltrates Pandora and provides Joo-Heon with information.
Yuka Sasaki
Voiced by: Kim Ha-Ru, Yuki Takada (Japanese), Ali Macaulay (English)
High school student from Japan who’s a big fan of Seo Joo-Heon.

=== Antagonists ===
Kwon Tae-Joon
Voiced by: Min Eung-sik (Korean), Junichi Suwabe (Japanese), Max Hartman (English)
Main antagonist. A board member of Pandora and the chairman of TKBM, the company that employs Joo-Heon's excavation team. He is one of the people who monopolized the use of relics in the original timeline and sent Joo-Heon's team to their death. In the new timeline, he is often the target of Joo-Heon's team. Chairman Kwon uses the relics of Julius Caesar and Achilles.
Keira Clark
Voiced by: Kim Na-yul (Korean), Yūko Kaida (Japanese)
A U.S. Soldier known as the King of War. She is one of the people who monopolized the use of relics in the original timeline and plunged the world into war. In the new timeline, Joo-Heon's team manages to stop her from collecting the map relics that allow her to strike at her enemies with precision.
Yang Chen
A former member of Joo-Heon's team, he betrayed his teammates after Chairman Kwon promised him a promotion in the original timeline. In the new timeline, he still works for TKBM.
James Rothschild
The human identity of the relic of Prometheus and the leader of Pandora.
Eve Rockefeller
A member of the Rockefeller family and a high ranking member of Pandora. She uses the relic of Merlin.
Joshua Jackson
A member of Pandora known as the King of Fate. He uses the relic of the Oracle of Delphi to predict prophecies.
Jin Chae Won
The leader of the China-Russia alliance. She uses the relic of Gluttony to immobilize the use of other relics.
Kwon Hyuk Soo
An ally of Chairman Kwon and the leader of TKBM's clean-up team.
John Harper
An agent of the Vatican and a former member of Joo-Heon's team. Although he betrayed his team alongside Yang Chen, Joo-Heon was unaware of his treachery.

== Media ==
=== Web novel ===
Written by Sanji Jiksong, Tomb Raider King was first serialized in Kakao's digital comic and fiction platform KakaoPage since November 1, 2016. The novel was licensed in English by Wuxiaworld and released from December 14, 2019, to May 22, 2021.

=== Webtoon ===
A webtoon adaptation launched in KakaoPage on June 30, 2019, and concluded its first season on January 30, 2023; its second season began on February 9, 2023, concluding on March 27, 2023, with its 412th chapter. Its first collected volume was released by Redice Studio on January 5, 2021. It is published on Tapas in English. The collected volumes have been licensed and published in North America by Yen Press since November 22, 2022.

==== Volumes ====
No.	Original release date	Original ISBN	English release date	English ISBN
01	January 5, 2021	979-11-97221-00-2	November 22, 2022	979-8-40-090007-5
02	May 25, 2021	979-11-97221-05-7	March 21, 2023	979-8-40-090013-6
03	July 27, 2021	979-11-97221-07-1	June 20, 2023	979-8-40-090035-8
04	December 7, 2021	979-11-91841-04-6	September 19, 2023	979-8-40-090052-5
05	March 29, 2022	979-1-19-184110-7	December 12, 2023	979-8-40-090103-4
06	June 28, 2022	979-1-19-184116-9	March 19, 2024	979-8-40-090104-1
07	December 15, 2022	979-1-19-184129-9	June 18, 2024	979-8-40-090105-8
08	May 25, 2023	979-1-19-184140-4	September 14, 2024	979-8-40-090208-6
09	July 18, 2023	979-1-19-184145-9	December 10, 2024	979-8-40-090210-9
10	December 5, 2023	979-1-19-184158-9	March 18, 2025	979-8-40-090212-3
11	April 16, 2024	979-1-19-184167-1	June 17, 2025	979-8-40-090330-4
12	August 8, 2024	979-1-19-413124-3	September 23, 2025	979-8-40-090332-8
13	December 30, 2024	979-1-17-315060-9	December 30, 2025	979-8-40-090334-2
14	May 13, 2025	979-1-17-315070-8	April 21, 2026	979-8-40-090336-6
15	September 16, 2025	979-1-17-315079-1	July 21, 2026	979-8-40-090537-7
16	December 18, 2025	979-1-17-315091-3	October 20, 2026	979-8-40-090539-1
17	March 31, 2026	979-1-17-315105-7	January 19, 2027	979-8-40-090666-4
18	July 29, 2026	979-1-17-315116-3	April 20, 2027	979-8-4009-0668-8

=== Aeni ===
An aeni television series adaptation was announced at Anime Expo 2024. It is produced by Studio EEK and directed by Woo Seung-wook, with Lee Hyun-joung serving as character designer and Kim Ju-young composing the music. The series aired on Aniplus in South Korea, as well as its Japanese dub from July 9 to September 30, 2026, on Fuji TV's B8station programming block under the title King of Grave Robbery (盗掘王, Tōkutsu Ō). (Note: Fuji TV listed the series premiere on July 8 at 25:15, which is effectively July 9 at 1:15 a.m. JST.) The opening theme song is "Show Down", while the ending theme song is "To Be Continued", both performed by QWER.

Crunchyroll is streaming the series, (Note: The series is available in North America, Central America, South America, Europe, Africa, Oceania, the Middle East, CIS (excluding Russia), India and Southeast Asia.) which also has an English dub. Medialink licensed the series in Southeast Asia.

==== Episodes ====
No.	Title	Directed by	Storyboarded by	Original release date
1	"Once Again from the End"; Transliteration: "Majimak-eseo Dasi (Korean); Owari Kara Futatabi (Japanese)" (마지막에서 다시 (Korean) 終わりから再び (Japanese))	Lee Kap-min & Jo Hun	Woo Seung-wook & Kim C.H	July 9, 2026
2	"Those Who Seek to Own Relics"	Unknown	TBA	July 16, 2026
3	"One Suited for Domination"	Unknown	TBA	July 22, 2026
4	"The One Who Stole the Future"	Unknown	TBA	July 29, 2026
5	"The Owner of the Tree of Life"	Unknown	TBA	August 5, 2026
6	"The Great Entombment"	Unknown	TBA	August 12, 2026
7	"Restoration of Relics"	Unknown	TBA	August 19, 2026
8	"The Secret of the Crow"	Unknown	TBA	August 26, 2026
9	"The Ruler of Relics"	Unknown	TBA	September 2, 2026
10	"The Curse of the Relics"	Unknown	TBA	September 10, 2026
11	"Tian Fu's Relic"	Unknown	TBA	September 16, 2026
12	"Tomb Raider King"	Unknown	TBA	September 30, 2026

=== Video game ===
In May 29, 2025, Tomb Raider King collaborated with the mobile idle RPG "Max Level Idle" which included Seo Joo-Heon, Irene Holton, and Lee Seol-Ah as playable characters.

== Sequel ==
=== Tomb Raider King: End Line ===
In July 2026, Kakao announced a sequel titled Tomb Raider King: End Line.

The story is set after the events of Tomb Raider King; After Joo-Heon’s wedding with Irene, he sees a hallucination of his daughter being kidnapped by unknown relics. He later discovers a relic opening to a multiverse of powerful rival Majesties and warring relics, he embarks on a journey to rescue his lost daughter.

The web novel is also written by Sanji Jiksong.
