= Black Rubber Shoes =

South Korean animated television show

- Front cover for volume 1 Giyeong (left), Gicheol (Right)

Creative team
- Written by: Doraemi (도래미)
- Artist: Lee Wooyoung (이우영)

- Black Rubber Shoes
- Hangul: 검정고무신
- RR: Geomjeong gomusin
- MR: Kŏmjŏng komusin

Black Rubber Shoes (Korean: 검정고무신) is a South Korean manhwa and a South Korean animated television show for children.

The stories take place in the city of Seoul in the 1960s and 1970s. The title refers to black gomusin, shoes made of rubber which children frequently had to wear because they were cheap and durable.

It was nominated as a Best Program by the Korean Broadcasting Commission and recognized as a Common Good Animation in September, 2004. In addition, the Seoul YMCA Association of Children's Culture chose it as a Good Program Selected by Children.

== Synopsis ==
The story focuses on a Korean family that lives in 1960s Seoul. In the 60s, South Korea was still a developing country with many of its citizens living in poverty. Because of this, there are a lot of references to that time period such as the street vendors and the school bread deliveries.

The cartoon describes poverty and difficulties in the South Korea of the 1960s. The main characters are Giyoung and his older brother Gichul, a middle school student. Even though they are poor, Gichul and Giyoung always live happily and have fun. The episodes of the brothers and family arouse nostalgia and memories about the past in many older Korean viewers. Black Rubber Shoes is considered one of the best works of Korean animation. The show is known to catch people's attention regardless of gender or age.

== Characters ==
- Lee Gi-yeong (이기영)

The second son of the family and the main character of the show. Born 1960 (age 10)

- Lee Gi-cheol (이기철)

Older brother of Gi-yeong. Born 1956 (age 14).

- Chunsim (춘심)

Mother of Lee Gi-yeong, Lee Gi-cheol, Lee Oh-deok. Born 1929 (age 40).

- Lee Malryong (말룡)
- Jungunyun

Father of Lee Gi-yeong, Lee Gi-cheol, Lee Oh-deok. Born 1927, (age 42)

- Yi O-deok (이오덕)

Youngest of the family and sister of Gi-yeong and Gi-cheol (age 1). First appeared in 2005.

- Jeon Seong-cheol (전성철)

Friend of Lee Gi-yeong

- Kim Do-seung (김도승)

Friend of Lee Gi-yeong

== History ==
Since the show debuted in 1999, it has become beloved by many children. It was broadcast on KBS 2 TV. The original version is a comic by Lee Woo-Young. The first broadcast for a special for Lunar New Year's Day program was so popular that it was made into a new series from 2000 to 2004.

On November 19, 2020, it was released exclusively at CGV under the theatrical version titled The Black Rubber Shoes of Memories. Starting with the series of cartoons, it was the first time in 28 years that a theatrical version was made, and even with a TV animation as the starting point, it was the first theatrical version in 20 years.

== Animation ==
The animation was produced and invested by Korea Broadcasting Corporation, Saehan Production, Hoseo University, and Hoseo Venture Investment (a company invested by Hoseo University), while KBS Media acted as a PR and business window.

After making its debut as a special broadcast on New Year's Day in 1999 on Korean Broadcasting, the first TV series with 13 episodes was produced and aired in 2000. After that, it aired every Wednesday from June 16, 2004, to January 5, 2005.

(Second TV series) Some content was re-broadcast from May 25, 2005, to June 30, 2005, due to viewers' request for rebroadcast, and a new TV series was produced and aired in mid-May 2005. Like the original cartoon, the animation mainly dealt with the growing up of the brothers, and the special feature 〈The Ordeal of Barley Mountain〉, a trilogy, tells the story of overcoming difficulties due to sudden unemployment of the father through family love.

From October 28, 2009, to November 11, 2009, and Children's Day (HD version), the episode was re-broadcast from May 1, 2013, to May 3, 2013. In 2015, the 4 black rubber shoes, which were jointly produced by reuniting with Hyeongseol-N after 10 years, aired from May 11 to August 10.
