= Stress Zero =

South Korean 2021 animated movie

- Theatrical poster
- 스트레스 제로
- Directed by: Daehee Lee
- Starring: Joohyun Lim; Jeon Sook-kyung; Youngjin Kim; Sarah Kim; Seungtae Kim; Donggyun; Lim Chae-heon
- Production companies: 302 Planet; Lee Dae-hee Animation Studio
- Release date: 3 February 2021
- Running time: 95 minutes
- Country: South Korea
- Language: Korean

Stress Zero is a Korean animated movie written and directed by Lee Dae-hee. It was released in South Korea in February 2021

== Synopsis ==
One day, a huge monster appeared all over Seoul, causing confusion in Korea. Jjang-dol, As a result, lost his job due to the devastation, he wants to escape unemployment by selling 'Stress Zero' with his friends Dr. Ko and Ta-jo, but finds out that the drink is the only secret to stopping the monster

== See also ==
South Korean animation
