= History of Korean animation =

The history of Korean animation, began with Japanese and American characters dominating the industry. The first sound animated character was created in 1936. The first Korean animation studio opened in Pyongyang in 1948. The first feature-length animated character appeared in 1967. Dooly the Little Dinosaur revolutionized the character market in 1987. As animation characters specific to Korea appeared, the Korean character market continued to grow. Since then, Korean character franchises have even exported their characters to other countries.

== History ==
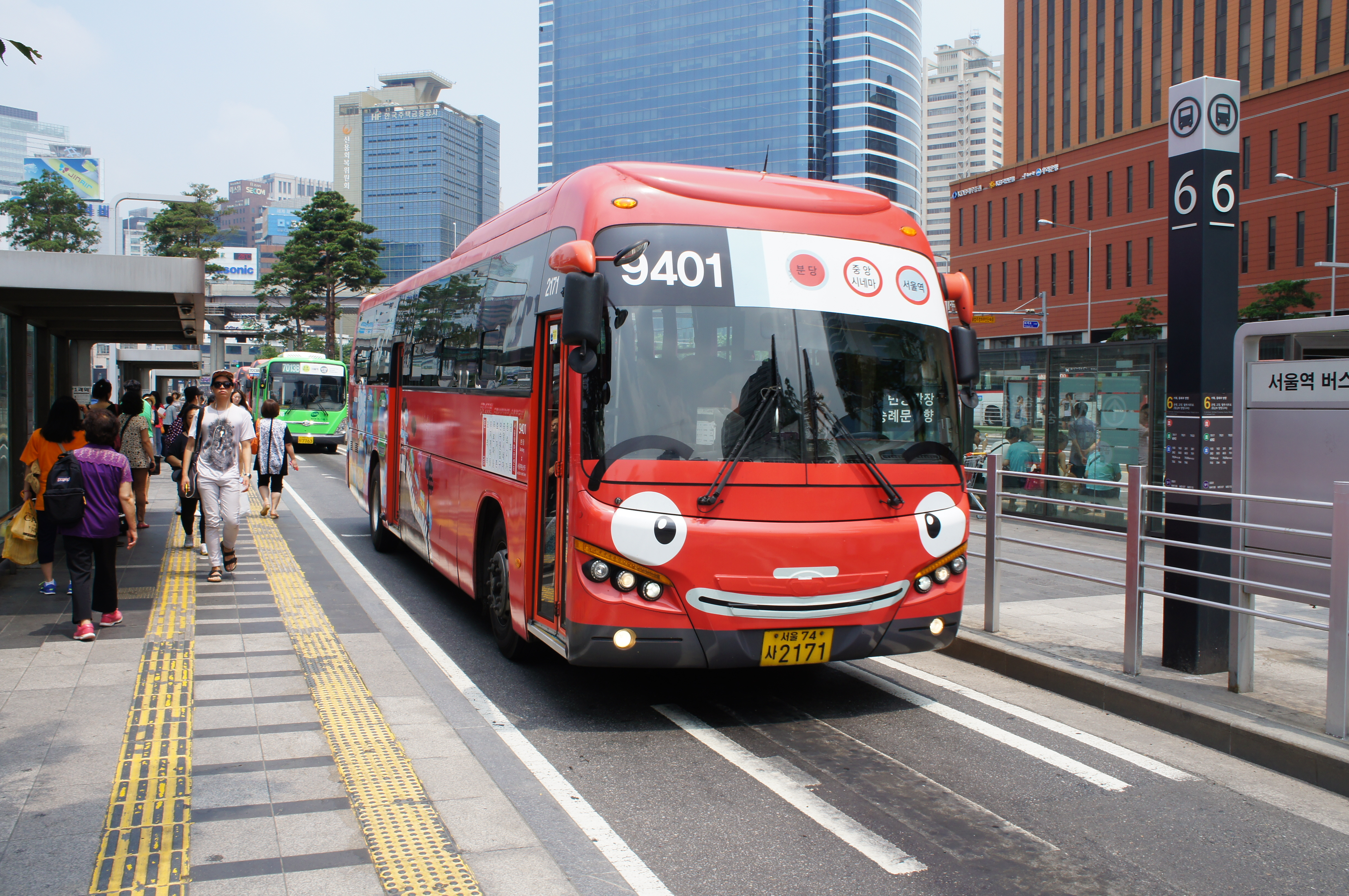
Tayo bus 'Gani'

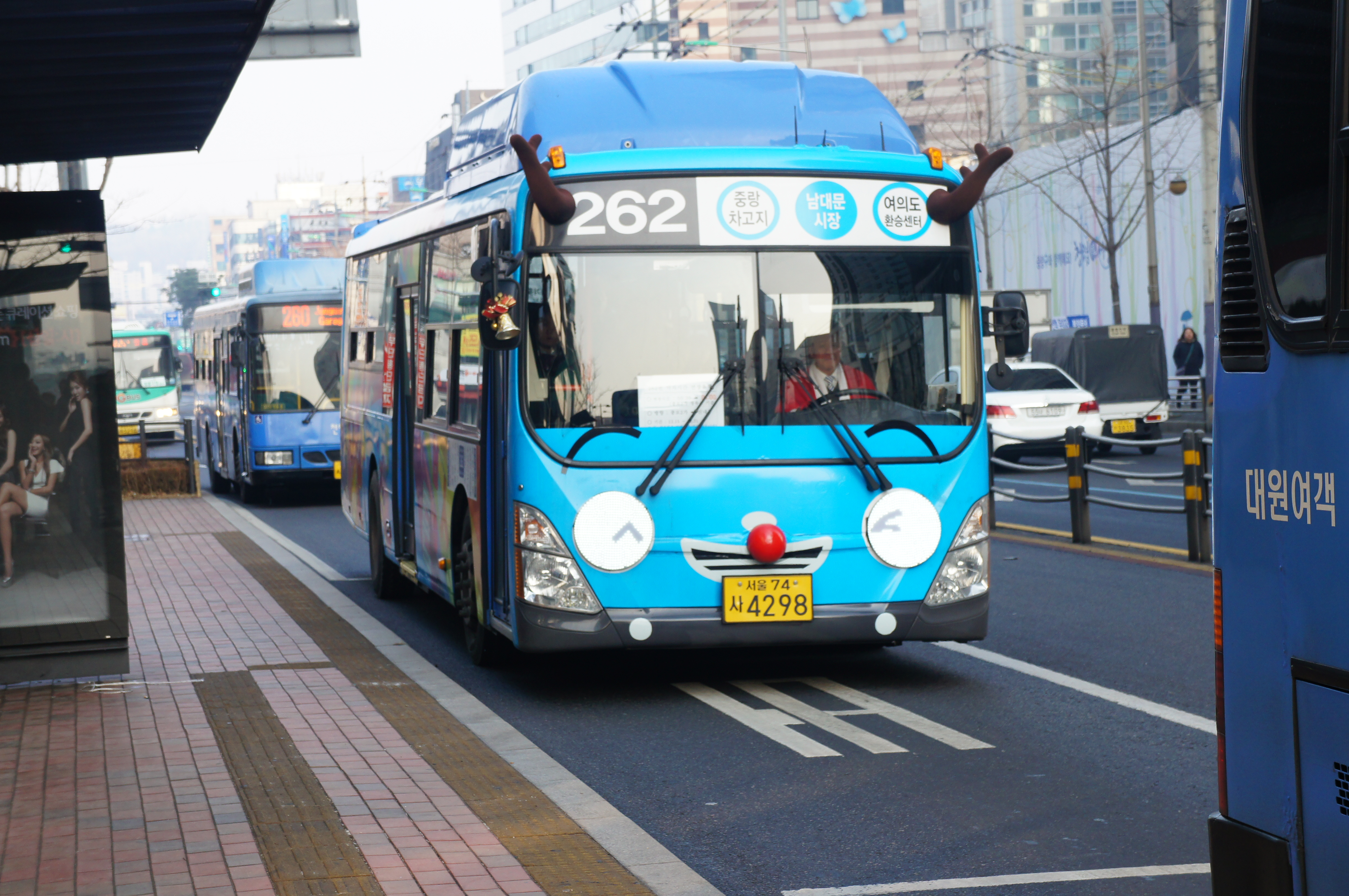
Tayo bus 'Rudolph'

According to records, the first animated works in Korea can be traced back to when it was a Japanese colony. The first sound animated character was 'Gaekkum' (개꿈), who was created in 1936. However, the animation is lost. During the Russian and American occupation, the Pyongyang animation study opened in 1948. In the same year, the north region of the parallel 38th became a communist republic.

=== South Korea ===
Before the 1960s, Korean animation only existed for commercial advertising. Mun Dalbu created a successful animated commercial for Lucky Toothpaste, broadcast on HLKZ TV in 1956. After that, animation was widely used in Korean advertising. Shin Dong-hun and his apprentice Nelson Shin are the main animators in this period, using limited techniques due to the political situation and lack of animation schools.

Gaemi Wa Bechangi (The Ant and the Grasshopper) made by animators Jeong Do-bin, Han Seong-hak and Park Young-il, was the first independent animation film in the country. First animated feature, Hong Gil-dong, was produced by Segi Company and animated by Shin Dong-heon in 1967. Shin did another animated film, Hoppie and Chadolbawee (1967), but as it didn't get the same success, Shin quitted animation.

In 1987, Dooly the Little Dinosaur first aired as a six-part TV show, with another seven parts airing in 1988. In 1995, Kim Soo-jung, its creator, established a company named 'Dooly World' and went into the character design industry. The following year, the animated movie 'Dooly the Little Dinosaur' was released. In the 30 years since Dooly the Little Dinosaur launched, its related market generated 2–3 billion won per year (about 1.7–2.7 million dollars as of July 2018). This paved the way for the character market in Korea.

In 2003, Pororo the Little Penguin aired on EBS and became the new representation of Korean animation characters. Pororo aired in 127 countries around the world and was the first domestic animation to make a contract with Walt Disney Animation Studios directly. It was estimated that its brand value was worth ₩850 billion (equivalent to ₩1.07 trillion or US$749.51 million in 2025) and its economic impact amounted to ₩5.7 trillion (equivalent to ₩7.15 trillion or US$5.03 billion in 2025) 5.7 trillion won in 2013.

As of 2015, many other domestic Korean animations have gained popularity, such as Hello Jadoo, Tobot, Larva, and Tayo the Little Bus.

The animated Larva recorded ₩10 billion (equivalent to ₩12.54 billion or US$8.82 million in 2025) in sales in 2013. In addition, domestic characters such as Tayo the Little Bus have earned considerable sales due to the support of young children. South Korean animation reached the peak of international success with the cinema film Hello Jadoo: The Secret of Jeju Island in early 2022 which mixes local fairy tales and culture with modern animation. Cinema film Hello Jadoo: The Secret of Jeju Island selling over 1 million tickets in its first week.

=== North Korea ===
From 1948 until the 1980s, the Pyongyang animation studio produced more than two hundred films. In the 1980s, the studio employed around six hundred workers, and twenty animation directors. Aside from local productions, the SEK Studio (North Korea's primary animation producer) has been providing animation services for foreign clients in Italy, Spain, France, China, Russia, Japan and indirectly for the United States. In 2024, a server leak revealed that SEK Studio had worked on American animations such as Invincible and Iyanu: Child of Wonder, despite American sanctions against North Korea making such work illegal.

== Transition in character production methods ==
In the 1980s–1990s, cartoon characters expanded mainly because comic books were popular.

Between 2000 and 2010, Flash characters became prevalent in Korea because, they facilitated production. Scaling does not affect quality and the files are much smaller, which increases speed of transmission.

Later in the decade, 3D animations were mainly done with 3D STUDIO MAX or MAYA software and their production costs are much greater than for 2D Flash animations.
