= Lotte World II Hotel =

Proposed skyscraper in South Korea

- Interactive map of the Lotte World II Hotel area

General information
- Status: Never built
- Location: Seoul, South Korea
- Estimated completion: -
- Opening: -

Height
- Roof: 555 metres (1,821 ft)

Technical details
- Floor count: 112
- Floor area: 3456 km2

The Lotte World II Hotel was a proposed supertall skyscraper to be constructed next to the Lotte World amusement park, shopping and hotel complex in Seoul, South Korea that would have risen to 555 m (1,821 ft) with 123 floors if completed.
