= Ajang.com =

- Country of origin: South Korea
- Original language: Korean
- No. of seasons: 1
- No. of episodes: 13

Production
- Running time: 30 minutes
- Production companies: Mizion Entertainment; Korean Broadcasting System

Original release
- Network: KBS2
- Release: November 22, 2001 – February 14, 2002

Ajang.com (아장닷컴) is a 2001 South Korean animated series. It incorporated elements of the internet into its storyline, which was led by the titular baby character Ajang. The series' main character is based on the folk tale Baby Warrior Uturi (아기장수 우투리).

== Plot ==
The human world and the spiritual world used to coexist, however, the development of civilization started separating the two further. During this phase, the Dimensional Stone, a key element of the spiritual world, is lost, creating a deeper rift between both worlds, as well as spirits entering the virtual world. Ajang, who was taking care of the Dimensional Stone that day, is tasked to embark on an adventure to recover it.

== Characters ==
- Ajang is a baby with superhuman poewrs, dressed up in armor of a general, who loves milk. He prefers the internet to physical exercise.
- Nymph is based on Greek nymphs and is represented by a drop of water.
- Dodori is a Korean creature.
- Agu, based on the Korean Buddhist figure, is a glutton.

Other characters (appearing in the real world) include fortune teller Sori, IT expert Shini, programming expert Gyeongtae, as well as a whole host of other characters from legends appearing in the spiritual world.

== Production ==
The series likely stemmed from a UNICEF study which showed that Korean children talked more about computers and the internet to their friends, more than sixteen other countries, out of a sample of 10,000 children. The animators adapted the tale of the Baby General facing the background of the internet. The series was planned by Mizion Entertainment in association with the Korean Broadcasting System and the China International Cultural Exchange Center. The series was animated at Storm Animation and Mago21.

The initial goal was to promote milk consumption, as the Dairy Promotion Board intended to use the Milk Song (우유송) in the series soundtrack. Although the song did not achieve popularity among the intended target, around 2002, it became an internet meme, spawning parodies. The series became popular because of the integration of the internet into the plotline.

Mizion and AhnLab signed a joint marketing agreement on June 27, 2001, to develop the series website.

In February 2002, Ajang was selected as the mascot of antivirus company AhnLab.

The series ended scoring 10% share in its initial run on KBS2. The accompanying website also got popular among children, to an extent where children went to the website on purpose just to hear the songs from the show. Mizion had long-term plans to make it an educational portal. A second season was reportedly in the works in February 2002, which would also be seen in China and would take in consideration that country's culture.
