= Robot Taekwon V =

- Poster for Robot Taekwon V (1976)
- Hangul: 로보트 태권브이
- RR: Roboteu taegwon beui
- MR: Robot'ŭ t'aekwŏn pŭi
- Directed by: Kim Cheong-gi
- Written by: Ji Sang-Hak
- Produced by: Yu Hyun-mok
- Cinematography: Cho Bok-Dong
- Edited by: Yoon Ji-Young
- Music by: Choi Chang-Kwon
- Distributed by: Yoo Productions; Seoul Donghwa
- Release date: July 24, 1976
- Running time: 85 minutes
- Country: South Korea
- Language: Korean

Robot Taekwon V (Korean: 로보트 태권 V) is a 1976 South Korean animated science fiction film directed by Kim Cheong-gi and produced by Yu Hyun-mok. The film follows the protagonist Kim Hoon, a world champion taekwondo practitioner, as he pilots a giant mech called Taekwon V to fight against the evil antagonist Dr. Kaff and his army known as The Red Empire. Released on 24 July 1976, the film immediately gained massive success among audiences, selling 130,000 tickets on the day of its premiere, and consequently inspired a string of sequels afterwards. Robot Taekwon V also served as an important piece of political propaganda for the military regime of Park Chung Hee, conveying ideologies such as nationalism and anti-communism. In 2005, a digital restoration of the original film was released, and since then Robot Taekwon V is considered to be a landmark of the South Korean animation industry, as well as serving as a symbol of nostalgia for Koreans who grew up with the film series.

== Plot ==
Dr. Kaff is a genius physicist with outstanding abilities, but he is never acknowledged due to his hideous appearance. The continual rejection by society distorts his thoughts and personality, and Dr. Kaff vanishes with the promise of revenge and prepares for it. When the son of his former co-worker Dr. Kim, Kim Hoon, wins the World Taekwondo Competition, Dr. Kaff kidnaps Hoon's opponent along with many other martial arts players and scientists and brainwashes them. Dr. Kaff claims himself as Dr. Malcom and his troops as The Red Empire, and starts threatening the public safety.

In the chaos, Dr. Kim develops "Robot Taekwon V" in opposition of The Red Empire's threats. To counter, Dr. Kaff also builds a humanoid named Mary and disguises her as his daughter and sends her into Dr. Kim's lab with the purpose of stealing the blueprint of Robot Taekwon V. During Mary's mission, her identity is disclosed and she escapes, but soon after one of the soldiers of The Red Empire murders Dr. Kim. After his father's death, Hoon finds the completed Robot Taekwon V and trains to control it at his command. When he developed skills, Hoon gets on the robot with Yoon Young-hee, the daughter of Dr. Yoon, a co-developer of Robot Taekwon V, to get revenge for his father and save the world.

Robot Taekwon V's first encounter with The Red Empire is successful, but during the battle, Dr. Yoon is kidnapped by Dr. Kaff. Dr. Kaff tries to brainwash Dr. Yoon to obtain his technology, but Mary betrays Dr. Kaff and lets Dr. Yoon go, confessing that she wants to be a human like when she stayed with Hoon. As the released Dr. Yoon reveals where Dr. Kaff's base is located, Robot Taekwon V and the united troops break into the base, and a fierce battle occurs. Eventually, Hoon and his friends seize Dr. Kaff and The Red Empire's robots, and Dr. Kaff realizes his wrongdoing and throws himself under the cliff.

Comic relief is provided by Hoon's friend, an elementary school student name Kim Cheol. He has fashioned himself as "Tin-Can Robot Cheol" by cutting eyeholes into a tea kettle and wearing it on his head. Hoon's girlfriend, Yoon Young-hee, is also a pilot and taekwon-do practitioner, operating Taekwon V alongside Hoon as his co-pilot.

=== Specifications of Robot Taekwon V ===
According to the first robot registration card issued by the ministry of commerce, industry, and energy to Robot Taekwon V in 2006, its height is 56 meters, its weight is 1400 tons, and its power is 8.95 million KW. Its speed is 20–30 km/h when walking, 300 km/h when running, and 1.2 mach when flying.

== Voice cast ==
- Kim Young-ok as Kim Hoon
- Song Do-yeong as Yoon Yeong-hee
- Hwang Il-cheong as Dr. Kim
- Park Gyu-chae as Dr. Kaff
- Jung Hee-sun as Mary
- Woo Moon-hee as Kim Cheol

== Production ==
Robot Taekwon V was produced in Seoul Donghwa, an animation studio founded in 1975 by the director Kim Cheong-gi, as the first product of his dream to create autonomous local South Korean animation. Kim said that he was inspired by the Japanese manga series Mazinger Z in the creation of Robot Taekwon V, but stated his intention to differentiate it from Japanese manga and to instead localize the series to fit Korean audiences. Kim said he was also influenced by DC Comics, especially the designs of Superman and Batman, as many American magazines and comics that were distributed throughout South Korea from US military bases during this childhood. The V mark on Robot Taekwon V's torso has been compared to Superman's S. Lim Jung-Kyu, a character designer, said that his inspiration was derived from Disney animation.

Backlighting and stroboscopic effect were used in production for Robot Taekwon V for the first time in South Korean feature animated film. In the taekwondo fighting scenes, rotoscoping was used, which contributed to the development of animating technology in South Korea. In the animation department, Lim Jung-kyu worked as an animation director and a layout artist, while Jo Hang-ri assisted as a layout checker. The cost used for the production of the film was around 45 million KRW($35,000) and it took about 37,000 original color drawings to make the animation.

== Analysis ==
=== Representation ===
The science-fiction animation depicts the ordinary life of the South Korean people in the 1970s in many scenes. The patriarchal characteristics shown include the need for children to be disciplined into the docile, useful body, the roles of sons and daughters, and the punishment given to abnormal deviation. Coexistence of the value of Western science and the traditional system in Korea at the time of the creation of the film is shown through the moments like the dinner scene where Dr. Kim celebrates Hoon's victory shows Western-style food, cakes and a round table, representing American or Western culinary culture, which is distant from that of ordinary Koreans, who usually share their side dishes.

=== Political implication ===
The director Kim was known to be a fervent anti-communist due to his father being abducted by North Korean troops during the Korean War, which would have likely affected the emphasis of anti-communism in the film as well as the national political context. At the time of the film's creation, nationalism and anti-communism against North Korea was highly emphasized by the Park Chung Hee South Korean government's cultural policy. In the film, the nationalistic promotion is expressed through the design of Taekwon V's helmet, which took reference from the former Korean general Admiral Yi Sunsin, who was highly admired by President Park. The integral component of the animation, Taekwondo, was also promoted by President Park as the national martial arts that represents the power of the new independent Korea. Antagonist characters in the film represent communists with the evident title of The Red Empire. Since the main audience of the film, South Korean children, were exposed to the negative connotations of red as a symbol of communism in literature and educational materials, Dr. Kaff the villain was easily associated with communism that must be defeated.

== Reception ==
Robot Taekwon V was released at Daehan Cinema and Saegi Cinema on July 26, 1976, and 130,000 people watched it in Seoul. Worldwide, box office is estimated to be around $3,912,160.

=== Critical response ===
A critic took Robot Taekwon V as one of the strongest examples that shows the reason for the decadence in the South Korean animation industry in the late 20th century. They claim that it is not the lack of resources or talent but rather the limited nationalistic mindset of South Korean animators that may have restricted their creative potential. On the other hand, there is also a voice arguing that animated films are inevitably related to the realities of the society in which they are produced and received, and the expression political ideologies emphasized in the society is not only natural but inevitable to an extent. One interesting interpretation analyzes Mary, a humanoid who longed to be a human and went through identity crisis, as an existential, feminist icon with anxieties about her own humanity and role in the modern world.

=== Comparisons to Mazinger Z and copyright disputes ===
Robot Taekwon V has been considered plagiarism of the Japanese giant-robot manga and anime Mazinger Z. Mazinger Z was popular in South Korea at the time of Robot Taekwon V's creation, and Kim Cheong-gi discusses the plagiarism of Mazinger Z on his animated film, saying he wanted to create a Korean hero for Korean children. In order to emphasize the Korean ties of the film, he had leading characters perform the traditional martial art, taekwondo, and gave the robot the ability to do taekwondo kicks. The sequel, Super Taekwon V, took designs from Gundam and Xabungle. The possible reason for the plagiarism issues in South Korean animated films around the time is because many Korean animation studios were subcontracted to work for Japanese animation industry due to the higher labor costs in Japan.

Decades after the film's initial release, the first court debate case surrounding the issue of copyright of Robot Taekwon V took place. Robot Taekwon V Corp sued a toy importer for violation of copyright and the toy company countered insisting there is no copyright for Robot Taekwon V as it was already plagiarized. The verdict by Seoul Central Court in July 2018 saw Robot Taekwon V as a secondary creation rather than a copy and acknowledged the distinct differences between Robot Taekwon V and the Japanese animation, ordering the toy importer to pay 40 million won.

== Sequels ==
Robot Taekwon V has inspired a number of film and comic book sequels. The film sequels include:

English title	Korean title	Release date
Robot Taekwon V: Space Mission	로보트 태권V 우주작전	December 13, 1976
Robot Taekwon V: Underwater Rangers	로보트 태권V 수중특공대	July 20, 1977
Robot Taekwon V vs. Golden Wings Showdown	로보트 태권V 대 황금날개의 대결	July 26, 1978
Fly! Spaceship Geobukseon	날아라! 우주전함 거북선	July 26, 1979
Super Taekwon V	슈퍼 태권V	July 30, 1982
84 Taekwon V	84 태권V	August 3, 1984
Robot Taekwon V 90	로보트 태권V 90	July 28, 1990

In 2008, it was announced that the live action version of Robot Taekwon V will be released in late 2009, led by the director Won Shin-yun. However, the release of the film was delayed indefinitely without any details on the progress. The remaining possibility for the film was discussed again in 2017, claiming that director Na Hong-jin was offered to take a lead. Since then, there has been little update on the film, and it is most likely that these plans have permanently stalled.

== Overseas release ==
Robot Taekwon V was released in the United States on VHS in a dubbed format under the name Voltar the Invincible (which is a somewhat split-up version of the original film).

It was also released in many other countries such as in Italy as Space War and in Spain as Space Operation: Robot Heroes in the 1980s. The aforementioned two localizations also got the film's sequel Robot Taekwon V: Space Mission as they were all released as part of a package in an Italian anthology series titled I Magnifici Eroi (The Ten Magnificent Heroes) licensed through Korean company Yoo Production Seoul, showcasing a compilation of Korean superhero animated films from the 1970s inspired by popular Japanese media.

== Legacy ==
Robot Taekwon V became an opportunity for the vitalization of local animation production that was recessed in early 1970s. Commercially, while adult films stagnated in making a profit, Robot Taekwon V established the new era where young audience was considered as the primary consumer in the film industry. The hit of the animated kids movie resulted in the popularity of kids content not only in the film but also in the TV and music industry.

=== Branding ===
In 2006, Shincine Communication Co. created a company under the name of "Robot Taekwon V." The company manages the character's future media appearances, including TV, music video, computer games, ads and films.

In 2008, Robot Taekwon V was selected as the nation's goodwill ambassador for the United Nations High Commissioner for Refugees (UNHCR) for the first time as a character in an animated film. The representative of the Seoul bureau of the UNHCR explained that "Taekwon V is a character that protects the weak and gives hope and courage to people."

On October 15, 2015, V Center, Robot Taekwon V Museum by Experience, opened on the Museum of Moving Image land in Gangdong District, Seoul. With a narrative program composed of ten sections, the museum offers opportunity to experience the inside of Robot Taekwon V base.

=== Home media releases ===
in 1985, the film itself received some VHS releases by various different video distributors.

The film's original soundtrack alongside its sequels were released on LP vinyl and cassette.

=== Restoration ===
Despite the film being released on home video, the original print of Robot Taekwon V has long been thought lost, and the only available print was incomplete and in very poor condition. However, as a duplicate print was found in a warehouse of the Korean Film Council in 2003, the restoration began. During the two years of process, about 5,000 people were put in yearly. The restored version of Robot Taekwon V was screened at The 10th Busan International Film Festival on October 9 and 11, 2005. The restoration was widely released in early 2007 and set a new record for domestic animated films, attracting over 600,000 viewers in 18 days.

Due to the amount of damage the original film suffered, some scenes have been cut-out and the audio was redone alonside the original voice cast being replaced with different voice actors.

== See also ==
- List of animated feature-length films
