= Guardians of the Video Game =

South Korean webtoon

전자오락수호대 RR: Jeonjaorak suhodae MR: Chŏnjaorak suhodae
- Genre: Action
- Author: Gasfard
- Webtoon service: Naver Webtoon (Korean); Line Webtoon (English)
- Original run: October 8, 2014 – May 12, 2021
- Volumes: 5

Guardians of the Video Game (Korean: 전자오락수호대) is a South Korean manhwa released as a webtoon written and illustrated by Gasfard.

== Release ==
Guardians of the Video Game was serialized via Naver Corporation's webtoon platform, Naver Webtoon, from October 2014 to May 2021, with the individual chapters collected and published into 5 volumes. The manhwa has been published in English by Line Webtoon. Gasfard launched Guardians of the Video Game in Naver's webtoon platform Naver Webtoon on October 8, 2014, and concluded on May 12, 2021, total 271st chapters.

=== Volumes ===
No.	Korean release date	Korean ISBN
1	July 8, 2015	978-8-90-120396-6
2	January 25, 2017	978-8-90-121471-9
3	January 25, 2017	978-8-90-121472-6
4	February 25, 2018	978-8-90-122224-0
5	February 25, 2018	978-8-90-122225-7

== Other media ==
=== Animated film ===
A film produced by Locus Studio has been announced for 2024 release window. In June 2026, Locus announced the film would release in 2026, and opened a crowdfunding campaign for fan-created content, with 3,000 selected participants expected to be credited in the film.

=== Video game ===
A South Korean mobile video game Role-playing game was released on iOS and Android on January 19, 2018, in worldwide. The game have been awarded as "Best of 2018" by Google Play.
