= Dooly the Little Dinosaur =

South Korean media franchise

- Cover of the first volume of the manhwa Dooly the Little Dinosaur
- Created by: Kim Soo-jung
- Original work: Dooly the Little Dinosaur (1983–1993)
- Owners: Bomulseom (1983–1993); Dooly Nara (Dooly Nation) (1995–present)
- Years: 1983–present

Films and television
- Film(s): Dooly the Little Dinosaur - The Adventure of Ice Planet (1996)
- Animated series: TV Animated series
- Direct-to-video: Direct to video

Dooly the Little Dinosaur (Korean: 아기공룡 둘리) is a South Korean media franchise created by cartoonist Kim Soo-jung. It was originally created as a manhwa (comic) that was serialized from 1983 to 1993. It centers on the titular Dooly, an anthropomorphic baby dinosaur character. The media franchise expanded to include a television series and animated film.

Dooly is a commercially successful character of South Korean animation. Dooly is also made a citizen of South Korea, and given a resident registration card. A Korean dinosaur species, Doolysaurus was named after the character in 2026.

There is an official sequel, Baby Saurus Dolly (베이비 사우르스 돌리), which came out in 1995.

== Characters ==
=== Dooly ===
Dooly
- First appearance: 1983
- Created by: Kim Soo-jung
- Voiced by: Park Young-nam

In-universe information
- Species: Ceratosaurus
- Gender: Male
- Nationality: South Korean

- Dooly (둘리; 杜里) is a baby dinosaur that was kidnapped by aliens, who had experimented to give him supernatural powers. When he returned to Earth, he was trapped in a glacier causing him to faint during the Ice Age. About 100 million years later, one of the glaciers broke off and he came to Seoul. Standing 4 feet and 6 inches tall, Dooly is a Ceratosaurus with an oversized head, meant to draw attention toward the character's facial expression, which he rarely changes. He has a tail as long as his height, and he sometimes uses it to make himself look taller than other characters, usually Kildong Go. He displays many human-like characteristics, including a habit of sticking out his tongue. His underside is full-white, as are his hands and feet. He has three toes per foot, and has five fingers on each hand, unlike a real Ceratosaurus which has four. He also has shiny teeth. He is like a typical kid who likes to eat and play all the time, but he can come across as being somewhat audacious, living the life of an orphan. Behind his thoughtful words, Dooly is just another baby dinosaur who misses his mother dinosaur. While in Seoul, he was found by a girl named Younghee (영희), and because she mistook Dooly for a dog she took him home with her and her elder brother Chulsoo (철수), and made him live with her as a pet. However, her father Gildong (길동) hates Dooly and just beats Dooly up whenever he is annoying. Dooly has superpowers that he received from an extraterrestrial, but doesn't know why. He doesn't quite know how to use it deliberately but in times of danger, he somehow manages to use the power. He points his right finger and yells 'Hoihoi!' He is always biting his tongue and looking silly, but he is both mischievous and loyal. Once in a while, he'll resist, like when he turns Kildong into a dinosaur and sends him to the Amazon, but whenever he does, it always turns against him. Dooly's name, according to the cartoon, is a pun. His older sister - Dooly called her 'brother' because he confused that exact nominal - is named Hana, meaning One or First while Dool, or Dul mean Two in Korean and y or ei mean the same thing in Korean Traditional-Chinese, making him the Second. This is mentioned around the end of then 2nd set of episodes, or the 6th episode, but it is not certain if this is true in manhwa canon due to the anime and manhwa having many storyline differences. While Dooly is having adventures in Seoul and having fun, he meets three friends who Kildong hates too and beats up, all except Heedong (희동).
- Heedong Park (박희동) came to live with Uncle Gildong after his parents went abroad to study. He misses his mom every day, but feels utterly entertained by Dooly the Brother. Thanks to the excessive amounts of time he spends with Dooly, he isn't afraid of anything. He is also really good at biting or scratching someone when they make him mad. He has broken Douner's Time Cosmos' Spaceship.
- Douner (도우너) the Prince of Planet 'Kanttappia' makes an emergency landing on the planet Earth due to the malfunctioning of the 'Time Cosmos' Spaceship. His head may be really hard and his thoughts very simple, but the word "loyalty" was made for Douner. He can travel back and forth in time and space in the Time Cosmos Spaceship which looks like a violin.
- Ddochi (또치), the Ostrich that successfully escaped from a Las Vegas circus troop, always insists that she used to be a noble mistress from Africa. She is a little bit selfish, and a little bit shy, but Ddochi is the most softhearted ostrich that anyone will ever come across. She also insists on calling herself a girl. Ddochi has many talents she learned from the circus.
- Michael (마이콜) is an aspiring singer who lives next to Kildong, and feeds on his passion for dreaming, though he may lack the necessary talent. He is quite lost most of the time, but does know how to take care of himself. Although he is South Korean, his appearance is noticeable different. His surname is Ma. He is based on Michael Jackson. Dooly once joined a band with Douner and Michael.
- Gildong Go (고길동) is an Uncle of Heedong and father of Chulsoo and Younghee. He usually scolds Dooly, Douner and Ddochi. He doesn't scold Heedong.
- Chulsoo Go (고철수) (Cheol-su) is a son of Gildong.
- Younghee Go (고영희) (Young-hee) is a daughter of Gildong.
- Jeongja Park (박정자) is a kind-hearted wife of Gildong.

== History ==
Dooly the Little Dinosaur was first serialized by its creator Soo-Jung Kim in the monthly manhwa (Korean comics) magazine Bo-Mool Sum (Treasure Island). It was first shown in the first week of April 1983, and ended about ten years later.

There is a spin-off of the manhwa, A Sad Homage to Dinosaur Dooly, Choi Kyu-seok published.

When Dooly was first created as a TV animation, it was criticized by some South Korean Catholics, citizens, and the government. Reasons cited included the fact that the animation was relatively violent, which was suppressed by the South Korean government, and the adult general public was angered due to its character's attitude of disrespect towards elders, but generally speaking, the younger generation has fond memories of this series and find that the violence is actually a quite realistic portrayal of family dynamics in contemporary South Korea.

The character "Michol" has also received criticism in more recent years due to the character's appearance being likened to blackface. It had started when SNL Korea and the K-pop band Apink did a skit based on Dooly's Ramen Song, which prominently feature Michol, portrayed by Bomi. It had received massive controversy, but it was also defended due to the belief of her just attempting cosplay.

== Related media ==
=== Animations ===
==== Television ====
===== 1987–1988 animation =====
The original animation and airing were done by South Korean broadcaster KBS. When it was first broadcast in 1987, there were only six episodes, with seven more added later during the second season, so it has thirteen episodes. A video cassette was released in 1989, and re-broadcasting was first done in 1990, and rebroadcast in 1993, 1996, 1998, 2003 and 2006.

====== List of episodes ======
- Season 1
1. "The Birth of Dooly" (둘리의 탄생; original airdate: October 7, 1987)
2. "Grand Park Disturbance" (대공원 소동; original airdate: October 7, 1987)
3. "My Friends" (내 친구들; original airdate: October 7, 1987)
4. "Hyeongah! Do Not Go" (형아! 가지 마; original airdate: October 7, 1987)
5. "Travel to the Past: Part 1" (과거로의 여행 (상); original airdate: October 7, 1987)
6. "Travel to the Past: Part 2" (과거로의 여행 (하); original airdate: October 7, 1987)
- Season 2
1. "Dooly's Anger" (둘리의 분노; original airdate: May 5, 1988)
2. "Michol's Debut" (마이콜 등장; original airdate: May 5, 1988)
3. "Ddochi's Escape" (또치의 탈출; original airdate: May 5, 1988)
4. "The Strange Lamp" (이상한 램프; original airdate: May 5, 1988)
5. "Dooly's Miniature" (둘리 소인국; original airdate: May 5, 1988)
6. "The Invaders from the Squid Planet: Part 1" (꼴뚜기 별의 왕자님 (상); original airdate: May 5, 1988)
7. "The Invaders from the Squid Planet: Part 2" (꼴뚜기 별의 왕자님 (하); original airdate: May 5, 1988)

====== Music ======
| # | Title | Artist | Writer | Composer | Arranger | Source |
|---|---|---|---|---|---|---|
| 1 | "Dooly the Little Dinosaur" (아기공룡 둘리; Agigongnyong Dulli) | Oh Seung-won | Kim Hyejin | Kim Dong-seong | | |
| 2 | "Looking at the Stars" (별을 쳐다보며; Byeoreul cheodabomyeo) | Oh Seung-won | Kim Hyejin | Kim Dong-seong | | |
| 3 | "Brother, Don't Go" (형아 가지마; Hyeonga gajima) | Oh Seung-won | Kim Hyejin | Kim Dong-seong | | |
| 4 | "Soap Bubbles" (비누방울; Binubangul) | Oh Seung-won (Chorus: Seoul Audio Chorus) | Kim Hyejin | Kim Dong-seong | | |
| 5 | "Ramen and Briquettes" (라면과 구공탄; Ramyeongwa gugongtan) (Ramyun And Coal Briquettes) | Nuclear Bombs and Guided Missiles (CV. Oh Se-hong, Park Yeong-nam, Sohn Jeong-ah) | Song Jeong-ryul | (Kim Do-hyang) | | |
| 6 | "Where is Michol" (마이콜은 어디에; Maikoreun eodie) | Kim Do-hyang | Kim Hyejin | Kim Dong-seong | | |
| 7 | "Yawn" (하품; Hapum) | Michol (CV. Oh Se-hong) | Kim Hyejin | Kim Dong-seong | | |

The songs of this animation are attractive and stimulate people's memories. The famous songs from this animation are the Dooly the Little Dinosaur, Soap Bubbles and Ramen and Briquettes. Among them, Soap Bubbles appeared as BGM covered by another person in the drama Tale of the Nine Tailed 1938 in 2023.

===== 2008 animation =====
A new version of the TV series, which began broadcasting in 2008, was Thursday, at 4:00 PM on the Korean animation channel Tooniverse, South Korea's first all-anime/manhwa channel, and SBS.

==== Direct-to-video ====
Sunwoo Entertainment released an educational English Direct-to-video South Korean animation named Dooly's Journey to the World in 1995.

=== Theatrical film ===
Dooly the Little Dinosaur - The Adventure of Ice Planet (Little Dinosaur Dooly: The Adventure of Ice Planet or Baby Dinosaur Dooly - The Great Adventure of the Ice Star) is a Korean animated film released in 1996. It was produced with a production cost of ₩2 billion won and was released in 70 theaters nationwide on July 24, 1996. According to the Korean Film Yearbook, the number of viewers in Seoul was 126,872.

Dooly, a baby dinosaur, was trapped in a huge iceberg 100 million years ago and separated from his mother, falling into a deep sleep. One day, pieces of iceberg flowed into the Han River, and Dooly, who woke up from a deep sleep, accidentally stayed at the house of Kildong Go, a small citizen living in Ssangmun-dong, and there wasn't a day that Kildong Go's house became comfortable from that day on. Heedong, the "Fearful Pacifier," Alien Douner, Ddochi Ostrich, and aspiring singer Michol will join, and they will travel to the future to quickly become adults on Time Cosmos. However, due to a time cosmos' error, they head to the ice star in the maze of space, where Dooly meets his dream mother. However, the ice star is dominated by the space villain Bayking, and Dooly and his party begin to be chased by Bayking's army.

For the 40th anniversary of the original work, Little Dinosaur Dooly: The Adventure of Ice Planet was re-released in cinemas in the 4K UHD format beginning May 24, 2023.

==== Soundtrack ====
Dooly the Little Dinosaur [ost] OST

Soundtrack album by Various artists
- Released: July 15, 1996
- Recorded: Seoul Studio
- Studio: Seoul Studio
- Genre: Soundtrack
- Length: 55:07
- Language: Korean
- Label: World Music
- Producer: Kim Hyeong-bae

Released on July 15, 1996
| No. | Title | Artist | Length |
|---|---|---|---|
| 1. | "My Love Dooly" (내사랑 둘리) | Kim Ji-hyeon, Dooly School | 4:19 |
| 2. | "Dooly and Bayo King" (둘리와 바요킹) | Dooly School | 5:54 |
| 3. | "Dooly the Little Dinosaur" (아기공룡 둘리) | | 3:51 |
| 4. | "Good-Bye [Lines]" (Good-Bye [대사]) | | 3:29 |
| 5. | "Good-Bye [Song]" | | 3:52 |
| 6. | "Good-Bye [New]" (아기공룡 둘리 [New]) | | 3:20 |
| 7. | "Queen of Kiss" (Kiss의 여왕) | TuTTi | 4:45 |
| 8. | "Dooly Chef's Song" (둘리요리사의 노래) | Park Yeong-nam, Choi Deok-hee, Lee Seon, Jung Mi-suk, Lee In-seong | 6:31 |
| 9. | "Ddochi's Song" (또치의 노래) | Lee Seon | 4:07 |
| 10. | "Michol's Song" (마이콜의 노래) | | 7:18 |
| 11. | "Bayo King's Song" (바요킹의 노래) | | 4:19 |
| 12. | "Dooly the Little Dinosaur [New Inst.]" (아기공룡 둘리 [New 연주]) | | 3:22 |

These were not included in the album, but in this work, Romance of the Guitar (Romance d'Amour, Romanza, Spanish Romance), Kim Jeong-ho's Sir' (님; nim) and Seol Un-do's Compass (나침반; nachimban) named Go Kildong Song came out as OSTs.
