= Kim Soo-jung =

South Korean cartoonist (born 1950)

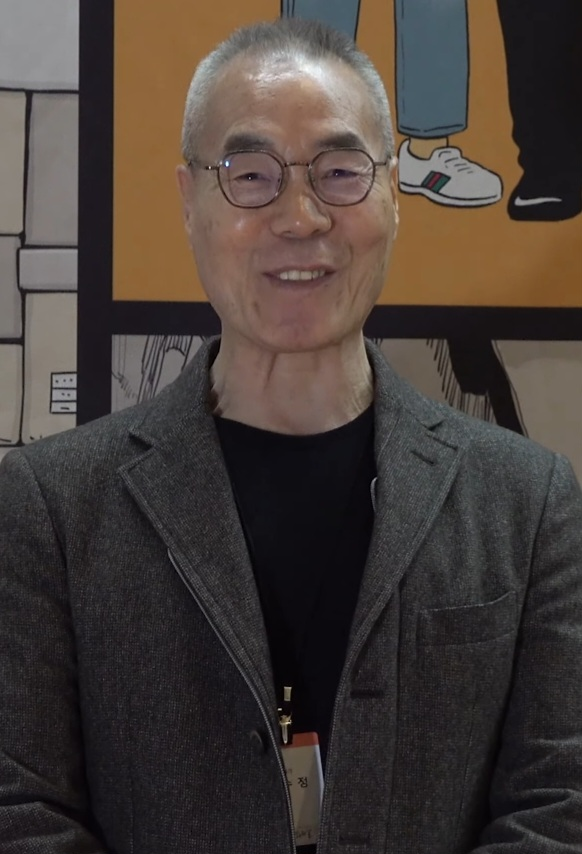
- Born: July 31, 1950 (age 75); Jinju, Gyeongsangnam-do, South Korea
- Occupations: Cartoonist; animator

Korean name
- Hangul: 김수정
- Hanja: 金水正
- RR: Gim Sujeong
- MR: Kim Sujŏng

Kim Soo-jung (Korean: 김수정; born July 31, 1950) is a South Korean cartoonist and animator best known as the creator of Dooly the Little Dinosaur. His debut occurred in 1975 after he won the Hankook Ilbo daily comics contest. In April 1983, Dooly the Dinosaur was first published in Bomulseom.

In 1995, Kim Soo-jung established a company named Dooly World and went into the character design industry. On April 22, 2013, Google Korea's doodle featured Dooly, his enemy Kildong, and his friends Douner, Ddochi and Heedong. This was the 30th anniversary of the creation of Dooly. Dobong-gu opened a Dooly Museum in July 2015.
