= South Korean animation =

Animation industry

- Hangul: 애니, 만화영화
- Revised Romanization: aeni, manhwa yeonghwa
- McCune–Reischauer: aeni, manhwa yŏnghwa

South Korean animation, or aeni (/ˈæni/; Korean: 애니) is hand-drawn and computer-generated animation originating from South Korea.

== Etymology ==
The word aeni comes from the English word "animation" as written in Hangeul, 애니메이션 (aenimeisyeon), similar to Japanese アニメーション (animēshon). Just like anime, aenimeisyeon was shortened to aeni. However, aeni usually refers to Japanese animation in colloquial usage, although it can refer to Korean animation or animation in general. To distinguish it from its Japanese counterpart, Korean animation is often called hanguk aeni (Korean: 한국 애니; lit. Korean animation) or guksan aeni (Korean: 국산 애니; lit. domestic animation).

A Sino-Korean term manhwa yeonghwa (Korean: 만화영화; Hanja: 漫畫映畫), a portmanteau of manhwa and the Korean term for movie, is also used as a general term for all animation.

== History ==
The South Korean animation industry was in a period of crisis throughout the 2000s. Depression at the reality of being an industry that the West merely gave factory-type drawings to began to sink in. This followed the 1990s, a period of explosive growth for the industry when Korean studios made most of their profits from OEM, mostly from the United States, or Japan.

In many ways, 2011 was a bright transitional year for Korean animation, with home-produced animated feature films finally finding box office success in South Korea, instead of facing the usual financial failure. As far as overseas export market is concerned, the likes of Rough Draft Korea (RDK) kept on landing new contracts, which have seen Rough Draft perform the manual work on over 45 popular Western cartoon titles over 16 years.

South Korean animation has boomed in popularity in Eastern Asia with the success of the series Pororo the Little Penguin and Origami Warriors in 2011. Then at the end of 2015 began to spread to Southeast Asia with the peculiarity of Hello Jadoo Season 3, continued at the beginning of 2022 with the internationally booming of movie Hello Jadoo: The Secret of Jeju Island with a strong local Korean cultural content, leaving fans wanting to discover more Korean animations. This success is due in part to perfecting the Korean animation technique, and financial returns being reinvested into new animated products.

Some Korean animators still blame the booming Korean game industry for draining the animation industry's talent pool, but the box office success of the Korean animated film Leafie in 2011 in South Korea is inspiring a new generation.

== Animation industry ==
Animation contracts for Korean animation studios range from collaboration/minor contribution contracts, to most of the work. The South Korean animation industry can be considered dynamic as there are more than a hundred animation studios. While it is mostly firms in South Korea that contract with Western studios, some of the work is reported to be subcontracted to North Korea as well.

=== Korean animation characters in public spaces ===
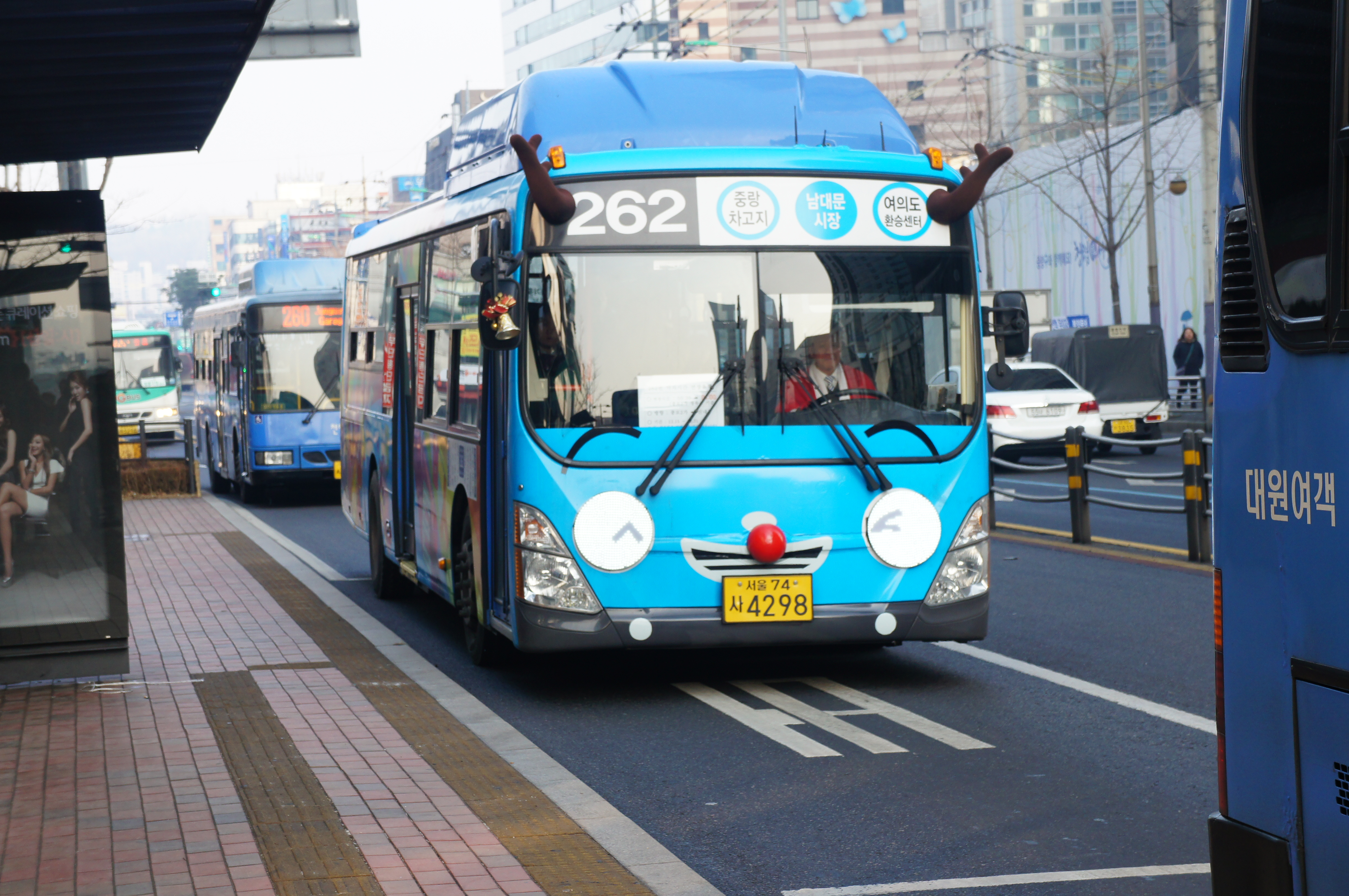
Tayo bus 'Rudolph'

- Larva subway was a subway based on and featured a Larva character. It operated from November 2014 until May 2015 on line No. 2. The Seoul government and Metro explained that they wanted to give citizens a chance to celebrate the 40th anniversary of the subways opening.
- Tayo buses were organized by the Seoul Metropolitan Government, the Bus Transport Business Association, and the animation company which made Tayo the Little Bus for the Public Transportation Day. In 2014, the Seoul Metropolitan Government commissioned buses designed as the characters of Tayo the Little Bus to go around the Gwanghwamun Square area of the city.
- In 2014, statues of Larva and Pororo the Little Penguin were installed in World Park, which is a square in the Lotte World II Hotel. They were well received by citizens and tourist.
- Then in the South Korea's 2017 General Election, main character from Hello Jadoo, Choi Ja-doo, chosen as society ambassador who campaigned peace within democracy and prohibition on abstention, as well as commemorated 20 years since Hello Jadoo was first launched in 1997. Until 2018, Choi Ja-doo presented on many South Korea's international promotional products and welcoming foreign guests. So then Hello Jadoo got the nickname as representative national animation.

=== Webtoonimation ===
Webtoonimation (웹투니메이션) is a combination of webtoon and animation, and refers to animation produced based on webtoon.

Until the mid-2010s, animation based on webtoons was not properly produced. However, in 2020, changes in the Korean animation market began to occur, and animation production based on webtoons started.

There is a possibility that the problem of absence of animation for teenagers/adults, which was a disappointing point of Korean animation, will be solved through webtoon IP. In the 2020s, most of the younger generations affected by popular culture that is open to the animation market are now adults and enter society with sufficient economic power to consume, so it is evaluated that there is a foothold. In other words, as the generation that actively consumes cartoons and webtoons in a somewhat established national economy has become adults, the animation industry, which has been marginalized, has drawn attention again.

In December 2022, an animated series of popular webtoon Lookism was released on Netflix, and animation adaptations of "Seasons of Blossom"(청춘블라썸), "The Boxer"(더 복서), "Guardians of the Video Game"(전자오락수호대), "Terror Man"(테러맨), "Nano List" (나노리스트), "Gosu" (고수), and "House Keeper"(하우스키퍼) are currently being made in South Korea. In August 2024 "True Beauty"(여신강림) was released on Crunchyroll.

== Market ==
In 2010, according to the Korea Creative Content Agency, the Korean market share of domestic characters was about 28% and the remaining 72% was for foreign characters, such as those from Japan and U.S. In 2012, experts predicted that the total market size would grow to ₩10 trillion (equivalent to ₩12.7 trillion or US$9.48 billion in 2025) in the near future. In 2014, the domestic character market share soared to 40% and its value in 2013 had reached ₩8 trillion (equivalent to ₩10.03 trillion or US$7.48 billion in 2025).

=== Korean characters as international business ===
Before the emergence of Korean domestic characters like Choi Ja-doo in 2017 General Election, characters that enjoyed popularity were mostly from the United States and Japan.

== See also ==
- List of Korean animated films
- List of Korean animated series
- North Korean animation
- Anime
- Cinema of Korea
- Donghua
- Manhwa
- Taiwanese animation
- Video gaming in South Korea
- Webtoon
