= Hello Jadoo =

South Korean comic

안녕자두야 RR: Annyeong Jaduya MR: Annyŏng Chaduya
- Author: Lee Bin
- Publisher: Haksan Publishing
- Magazine: Party
- Original run: October 23, 1998 – present

Hello Jadoo
- Genre: Comedy-drama
- Directed by: Son Seok-woo; Ko Se-yoon (S1)
- Music by: Kim Jeong-ah; Woo Jin-ho (S1); Park Jin-hyun (S2)–(S5); Yoo Tae-jin (S2)–(S4); Yoon Joo-hyeon (S5)
- No. of seasons: 5
- No. of episodes: 95 + 1 film

Production
- Producers: Seok Jong-seo (S1–(S3); Lee Jeong-ik (S1), (S3); Lee Jong-hyuk (S2); Seong In-young (S2); Kwon Hye-min (S4); Jeong Hae-gun S4); Mun Ye-won (S5)
- Production companies: KNUANI (S1); Atoonz (S2)–(S5),

Original release
- Network: Tooniverse (S1)–(S4); Seoul Broadcasting System (S5)–(S6)
- Release: July 11, 2011 – May 7, 2025

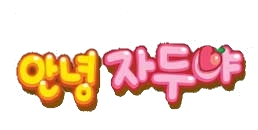
Hello Jadoo

Hello Jadoo (Korean: 안녕자두야) is a South Korean manhwa published by cartoonist Lee Bin in Monthly PARTY in September 1997. Tooniverse (CJ E&M broadcasting business division) and Atoonz co-produced an animation series under the same name in 2011, 2012, 2015, 2018, 2023, and 2025. The comic is set in Heukseok-dong, Dongjak District, Seoul, South Korea.

As of November 12, 2021 more than 31 books were published, along with a supplementary comic titled Mom is Best Friend. In early 2010, a four episode animation series called Hello Jadoo: Mom is Best Friend aired on Tooniverse, but it was not aired on SBS.

== Broadcast time ==
Broadcasting channel	Broadcasting period	Broadcasting time	Broadcasting season	Broadcasting quantity
SBS TV	July 18, 2011 – December 13, 2011	Monday, Tuesday from 4:00 p.m. to 4:30 p.m.	Season 1	30 minutes
SBS TV	May 23, 2012 – August 8, 2012	Tuesday, Wednesday from 4:00 p.m. to 4:30 p.m.	Season 1	30 minutes
SBS TV	September 19, 2012 – April 23, 2013	Tuesday, Wednesday from 4:00 p.m. to 4:30 p.m.	Season 2	30 minutes
SBS TV	November 9, 2015 – April 18, 2016	Monday from 4:30 p.m. to 5 p.m.	Season 3	30 minutes
SBS TV	November 26, 2017 – April 1, 2018	Sunday from 7:10 a.m. to 7:40 a.m.	Season 4	30 minutes
SBS TV	January 18 – April 26, 2023	Wednesday from 10:30 a.m. to 11:00 a.m.	Season 5	30 minutes
SBS TV	January 8 – May 7, 2025	Wednesday from 11:30 a.m. to 12:00 p.m.	Season 6	30 minutes

== Plot ==
The story is set in Seoul, South Korea in the 1980s and the 2000s, telling a pleasant and heartwarming story of Jadoo and the people around her.

== Characters ==
=== Main characters ===
Choi Jadoo (최자두)
Voice actor: Yeo Minjeong
The protagonist of the series, Jadoo is an outgoing and tomboyish 10-year-old girl with a short temper who often finds time for adventures in her life. She is the oldest of all 3 siblings.

Kim Nanhyang (김난향)
Voice actor: Yang Jeonghwa
Nanhyang is Jadoo's irascible mother who disapproves of Jadoo's antics. Despite loving and caring for all of her children, Nanhyang mostly favors Seunggi and Mimi over Jadoo on a daily basis.

Choi Hodol (최호돌)
Voice actor: Choi Junyoung
A North Korean refugee from Pyongyang, Hodol is Jadoo's father who works as a manager. Whenever Hodol receives his salary, he spends it on alcohol and gets drunk when he comes home, causing Nanhyang to be angry. In manhwa season 1 volume 4, he's nicknamed as "Choi Jusa" (최주사) because of his addiction to alcoholism.

Choi Mimi (최미미)
Voice actor: Jeong Yu-mi
Mimi is Jadoo's 8-year-old younger sister and the middle child of the family.

Choi Seunggi (최승기) (Note: Also known as the nickname 'Aegi' (애기, lit. 'baby').)
Voice actor: Kim Hyunji
Seunggi is Jadoo's 5-year-old younger brother. He is the frequent victim of Jadoo's antics, who often steals money from his allowance savings.

=== Supporting characters ===
Kim Minji (김민지)
Voice actor: Jeong Hyeok
Nicknamed "Cicada", Minji is Jadoo's outgoing best friend who is the top student in class. She is outgoing, yet aggressive towards Jadoo initially, but warms up to her in later stories. Minji dreams to be a scientist when she grows older.

Lee Yunseok (이윤석)
Voice actor: Kim Youngeun
Yunseok is the class president who is mischievous and often messes with Jadoo. He has a crush on Jadoo and had tried to confess himself multiple times, but failed due to misunderstanding.

Jang Seonghun (장성훈)
Voice actor: Jeong Hyewon
Seonghun is one of Jadoo's classmates who was born as an only child to a wealthy family. He is not athletic and often tries to skip Physical Education classes. Although Seonghun was afraid of Jadoo at first, he fell in love with her due to her cute looks. He has a snail given to him by Jadoo. Seonghun is also rivals with Yunseok as the two both like Jadoo and often compete each other, though they occasionally are friendly to each other.

Kim Seondol "Doldol" (김서돌 "똘똘")
Voice actor: Jeong Yumi
Nicknamed "Doldol", Seondol is one of Jadoo's classmates who is modeled on the writer's husband, Jeon Hojin, though this applies to the manhwa version of him rather than the anime version of him. Like Seonghun, he comes from a wealthy family, as his father works as a CEO. Seondol is a chubby boy who often teases Jadoo and the two are childhood friends.

Lee Eunhui (이은희)
Voice actor: Kim Saehae
Eunhui is one of Jadoo's classmates who likes to be the center of attention and always mocks other students. She has a crush on Sungi and dreams of becoming a singer. Eunhui is frenemies with Jadoo and the two often compete each other.

Yoon Sungi "Ddalgi" (윤순기 "딸기")
Voice actor: Kim Boyeong
Nicknamed "Ddalgi"(meaning strawberry in Korean; because the shape of his face looks like a strawberry), Sungi is one of Jadoo's classmates whose parents manage a bakery, as stated in Season 3. He is a timid boy who is artistic and enjoys drawing.

Lee Mija (이미자)
Voice actor: Kim Boyeong
Mija is Jadoo's homeroom teacher and is referred to as “Ms. Lee” or “Teacher” by others. She sometimes scolds her, but the other children admire her attitude.

== Books ==
Below is a listing of all books from the Hello Jadoo series:

Volume	Release date	Subtitle list
Book 1	October 23, 1998	1st episode 《A chart of daily schedule》; 2nd episode 《Poo-poo and bath》; 3rd episode 《An autumn sports day》; 4th episode 《Christmas day of baby》; 5th episode 《Let's help the poor!》; 6th episode 《Fight a match with my mom (1)》; 7th episode 《Fight a match with my mom (2)》; 8th episode 《Tell me if you like!》; 9th episode 《Parents' Day gifts uproar》; 10th episode 《My partner》; 11th episode 《Mom's vacancy》; 12th episode 《Go to my grandmother's house (1)》; 13th episode 《Go to my grandmother's house (2)》; 14th episode 《Sisters' war》
Book 2	April 22, 1999	15th episode 《Color TV uproar》; 16th episode 《Ja-doo's house wintering preparation》; 17th episode 《Mom, where is my New Year's money?》; 18th episode 《Jean Valjean's First Love (1)》; 19th episode 《Jean Valjean's First Love (2)》; 20th episode 《A theater tour》; 21st episode 《Ja-doo's fruitful(?) winter vacation》; 22nd episode 《Ja-doo and Freud grandfather》; 23rd episode 《Dad, cheer up!》; 24th episode 《I like baseball》; 25th episode 《Let's play the flute together in the bathroom》
Book 3	August 26, 1999	26th episode 《'The Six Million Dollar Man' and 'A little kid of about 600,000 won'》; 27th episode 《Dad! He is having an accident!!》; 28th episode 《Mom's square cap》; 29th episode 《Spring has come to the body of Jadoo, too?!》; 30th episode 《Is my aunt a spy?》; 31st episode 《Chickenpox is coming!》; 32nd episode 《He that will steal a pin will steal an ox?!》; 33rd episode 《My mom fell in love at dancing?》; 34th episode 《My dad is a sparrow hunter》; 35th episode 《Don't look at me with sad eyes (1)》; 36th episode 《Don't look at me with sad eyes (2)》; 37th episode 《My beautiful adulterated food》; 38th episode 《Childhood curiosity》; 39th episode 《Daily study and scholarship room》
Book 4	February 26, 2000	40th episode 《It's so hard to be nice~》; 41st episode 《The day when Jadoo was drunk》; 42nd episode 《Summer scenery》; 43rd episode 《Ramen story》; 44th episode 《'Legendary fox with nine tails', 'Thousand years old fox' and 'Beauty without face'...?》; 45th episode 《Ja-doo! She is crazed about money again! (1)》; 46th episode 《Ja-doo! She is crazed about money again! (2)》; 47th episode 《Christmas after 17 years》; 48th episode 《Santa Claus is coming~♬》; 49th episode 《Gases from burning coal briquettes big event》; 50th episode 《Let's knit in winter♡》; 51st episode 《My friend cicada》; 52nd episode 《Mom's folk remedy prescription》; 53rd episode 《Pyongyang head-butt》; 54th episode 《Strawberry's dream》; 55th episode 《It's August, Hangawi~♬》
Book 5	August 24, 2000	56th episode 《Dad! Hold the mouse~!!》; 57th episode 《That's probably first love...》; 58th episode 《Dad, He is going to be Young-Goo!!》; 59th episode 《Mom and Swallow》; 60th episode 《A family worship day》; 61st episode 《Ah, a long-awaited(?) picnic》; 62nd episode 《Pogo stick uproar》; 63rd episode 《Teacher! Please come back soon~》; 64th episode 《I'm left-handed~》; 65th episode 《Bye, bear...》; 66th episode 《Kim Seon-dol with a poop》; 67th episode 《Is Ja-doo a thief?》; 68th episode 《Let's eat mixed rice and flour based food!》; 69th episode 《We want to have coffee too~》; 70th episode 《Beautiful times》
Book 6	September 22, 2001	71st episode 《Ja-doo, poop humiliation again...?》; 72nd episode 《Just imagine!!》; 73rd episode 《The winter of that year was warm...》; 74th episode 《Under the sky without my mom... (1)》; 75th episode 《Under the sky without my mom... (2)》; 76th episode 《Mom! Buy me a bed, too~!!》; 77th episode 《A strange and ominous flower-viewing》; 78th episode 《What happened to Seung-ki?》; 79th episode 《A huge fandom of girls》; 80th episode 《Blackout training?》; 81st episode 《The ghost of a well》
Book 7	September 24, 2002	82nd episode 《Mission: Impossible!!―Summer vacation homework!!》; 83rd episode 《Ja-doo's house is damaged by the flood!!》; 84th episode 《OLD IS BUT GOOD IS》; 85th episode 《Nickname》; 86th episode 《Memories of Ondol Room》; 87th episode 《This time, Grandma?!!》; 88th episode 《When I go flower picking...》; 89th episode 《A telephone story》; 90th episode 《Let's play soccer!!》; 91st episode 《Mom! Please say it~!》; 92nd episode 《A stormy summer vacation》
Book 8	October 15, 2003	93rd episode 《The eve of the new semester》; 94th episode 《Did you see it or didn't you?》; 95th episode 《Let's catch louses!》; 96th episode 《Mi-mi's Spring》; 97th episode 《A child who lives in a well》; 98th episode 《25 years ago... a day on a summer day》; 99th episode 《Chuseok Ghost story(?)》; 100th episode 《Watch out for revenge of bees!!》; 101st episode 《Winter is here!》; 102nd episode 《The toilet in the room(?)》; 103rd episode 《The future world(?)》; Special episode 《Find what I've lost...》
Book 9	April 25, 2005	104th episode 《A fire injection of fear》; 105th episode 《The flavor of winter》; 106th episode 《The Cruel History of Han River Bridge?》; 107th episode 《The only thing that Mi-mi has》; 108th episode 《The King of fruits, Banana??》; 109th episode 《The moment I want to erase it》; 110th episode 《Uri Geller's supernatural powers uproar》; 111th episode 《Song of a vinyl umbrella》; 112th episode 《A New Year's guest》; 113th episode 《113 Investigation Headquarters》; 114th episode 《The Cruel History of Han River Bridge II》; 115th episode 《Tadpoles and Frogs》
Book 10	April 8, 2006	116th episode 《The best gift》; 117th episode 《Ja-doo... She becomes a game addict!!》; 118th episode 《Mom and chick》; 119th episode 《The ghost of my grandfather》; 120th episode 《Mom VS. Dad》; 121st episode 《Fashion 80's》; 122nd episode 《The smell I like?》; 123rd episode 《Why did Ja-doo become Chunhyang?》; 124th episode 《Where is my friend's house?》; 125th episode 《<Mission: Impossible!!> Watch my New Year's money!! (1)》; 126th episode 《<Mission: Impossible!!> Watch my New Year's money!! (2)》; 127th episode 《Private lesson that everybody else does(?)》
Book 11	April 15, 2007	128th episode 《'Fool' Young-gil》; 129th episode 《A 10-year-old kiss》; 130th episode 《I want a dimple♡》; 131st episode 《My youngest brother》; 132nd episode 《Blessed wardrobe》; 133rd episode 《Ja-doo's troupe!! enthusiastic performance!!》; 134th episode 《Why did I want to wear glasses so much then?》; 135th episode 《A New Year's wish》; 136th episode 《Who is Valentine's Chocolate going to?》; 137th episode 《A day of sham illness》; 138th episode 《A briquette girl》; 139th episode 《A memory of poverty》
Book 12	September 15, 2008	140th episode 《Mom's treasure》; 141st episode 《A bean sprouts thief》; 142nd episode 《It's so hard to color my nails with balsam!》; 143rd episode 《Dreams(?) come true!!!》; 144th episode 《Walk in someone's shoes(易地思之)》; 145th episode 《You should eat your food evenly!!》; 146th episode 《Rollerskating field of Memories》; 147th episode 《I want to put on makeup, too♡》; 148th episode 《I hate milk!!》; 149th episode 《Ask your sisters~♡》; 150th episode 《Give me my leg (2)》; 151st episode 《My first friend》
Book 13	May 15, 2009	152nd episode 《Dad's gift》; 153rd episode 《Bye... mom...!! (1)》; 154th episode 《Bye... mom...!! (2)》; 155th episode 《Mom's apple》; 156th episode 《A tragic autumn picnic (1)》; 157th episode 《A tragic autumn picnic (2)》; 158th episode 《What's the end of saving...?》; 159th episode 《You, In the Fantasy》; 160th episode 《Strange story (1)》; 161st episode 《Strange story (2)》; 162nd episode 《Christmas theatre uproar》; 163rd episode 《A cash child》
Book 14	June 15, 2010	164th episode 《Love triangle (1)》; 165th episode 《Love triangle (2)》; 166th episode 《Today is the day!!》; 167th episode 《Summering is so painful(?)》; 168th episode 《Mom! Please protect my privacy!!》; 169th episode 《A dream to gain weight(?)》; 170th episode 《Take responsibility!!》; 171st episode 《Is my mom a ghost?》; 172nd episode 《Unfounded fears(起人憂天)》; 173rd episode 《Don't freeze, don't die, it'll resurrect.》; 174th episode 《I wish I had an older brother...》; 175th episode 《Mom's favorite?》
Book 15	June 30, 2011	176th episode 《The father we want (1)》; 177th episode 《The father we want (2)》; 178th episode 《The anti-war(反戰) movement of Mi-mi》; 179th episode 《I don't want my mom to come to school!!》; 180th episode 《Look at the ground and walk~!!》; 181st episode 《On how to correct my habit of eating only what I want...》; 182nd episode 《Poverty~ Please bye!!》; 183rd episode 《Memories of Cheese》; 184th episode 《Mom and Dad's Wedding Day uproar (1)》; 185th episode 《Mom and Dad's Wedding Day uproar (2)》; 186th episode 《Changing briquettes is too difficult...!》
Book 16	April 30, 2012	187th episode 《The Interpreter of My Love!! (1)》; 188th episode 《The Interpreter of My Love!! (2)》; 189th episode 《An uninvited guest》; 190th episode 《It's good for your health!》; 191st episode 《You fell in love with me♡》; 192nd episode 《A wrong encounter (1)》; 193rd episode 《A wrong encounter (2)》; 194th episode 《LUCKY BOY》; 195th episode 《A counterattack on Cheonggukjang》; 196th episode 《A child without shoes》; 197th episode 《The Taming of the Shrew》
Book 17	September 19, 2012	198th episode 《Scorched rice and Ddongpal (1)》; 199th episode 《Scorched rice and Ddongpal (1)》; 200th episode 《Watch out for physical examination days~!》; 201st episode 《Mom's part time job》; 202nd episode 《The glory of my family》; 203rd episode 《Is Seung-ki 'Mondo Cane'...?》; 204th episode 《Don't practice physical fitness test~!》; 205th episode 《There may be blue and better blue(?)》; 206th episode 《Legend of buffet!!》; 207th episode 《A story of Baekgoo》; 208th episode(Special episode) 《The reason why she collects Ddakji》
Book 18	March 20, 2013	209th episode 《Four-dimensional family》; 210th episode 《The Story of Scorched rice》; 211th episode 《speed of light scandal♡》; 212th episode 《Mom's diet》; 213th episode 《I like strawberries♡》; 214th episode 《COMEBACK HOME♡》; 215th episode 《The winter's teahouse》; 216th episode 《MAGIC OR GAG? (1)》; 217th episode 《MAGIC OR GAG? (2)》; 218th episode 《Give me the ginseng, too-!》; 219th episode(Special episode) 《New Year's Day VS. Lunar New Year》
Book 19	September 30, 2013	220th episode 《'If you listen to your mom well, you will get rice cakes even in your sleep.'...? (1)》; 221st episode 《'If you listen to your mom well, you will get rice cakes even in your sleep.'...? (2)》; 222nd episode 《Popularity vote》; 223rd episode 《Are Ja-doo and Mi-mi the same?》; 224th episode 《Tteok-bokki War》; 225th episode 《Environmental beautification is 'making a united effort to help a person'~!!》; 226th episode 《Only one bite!》; 227th episode 《Blue Monday escape》; 228th episode 《A kind Mr. Ho-dol》; 229th episode 《I wish I were tall...!!》
Book 20	March 24, 2014	230th episode 《Who is my husband in future?》; 231st episode 《Mom, part time job again!!》; 232nd episode 《Ja-doo Keller and Mi-ja Sullivan》; 233rd episode 《Vagabond》; 234th episode 《You are so busted!》; 235th episode 《Insect collecting》; 236th episode 《Well begun is half done!》; 237th episode 《A stormy singing contest (1)》; 238th episode 《A stormy singing contest (2)》; 239th episode 《Who is my manitto(secret angel)?》; 240th episode(Special episode) 《WOULD YOU LIKE 'Tteok-bokki'...?》
Book 21	November 25, 2014	241st episode 《The spring of a tree frog》; 242nd episode 《Trouble kingdom (subtitle: Broken)》; 243rd episode 《Like Usain Bolt!》; 244th episode 《I need my room!》; 245th episode 《Do you like something cute?》; 246th episode 《Dad VS. Ja-doo》; 247th episode 《24 Hours...》; 248th episode 《Like dandelion spores...》; 249th episode 《My neck is sprained!》; 250th episode 《Let me introduce my dad's girlfriend!》; 251st episode 《HOME SWEET HOME♡》
Book 22	June 25, 2015	252nd episode 《The best revenge》; 253rd episode 《Hunting in late summer heat》; 254th episode 《Friendship between dog and cat》; 255th episode 《The reason... why you can't do it》; 256th episode 《I want to be a Girl Scout, too!》; 257th episode 《Men's Season》; 258th episode 《Family's Embarrassing Secret》; 259th episode 《My love Sundae♡》; 260th episode 《Christmas with my friends♡》; 261st episode 《Dad's No Smoking (1)》; 262nd episode 《Dad's No Smoking (2)》
Book 23	December 25, 2015	263rd episode 《Don't come to my house!》; 264th episode 《Min-ji GOT TALENT》; 265th episode 《Ja-doo's ghost story (subtitle: Is Ja-doo a man?)》; 266th episode 《Mi-mi's playing house》; 267th episode 《Get the salt~!》; 268th episode 《You've got it all wrong》; 269th episode 《No 'Bullying'!》; 270th episode 《I like specter》; 271st episode 《My friend, Bayaba (1)》; 272nd episode 《My friend, Bayaba (2)》; 273rd episode 《Your habits》
Book 24	May 25, 2016	274th episode 《Silent Killer》; 275th episode 《Extremely disgusting → Extremely good feeling》; 276th episode 《My mom has two faces》; 277th episode 《The prince of wart》; 278th episode 《Let's love our language》; 279th episode 《My mom is a fortune-teller》; 280th episode 《Where on earth did the story come from?》; 281st episode 《My older sister and I》; 282nd episode 《You can't stop them at all》; 283rd episode 《The cane... How many times have you been hit...?》; 284th episode 《Who ate all that tuna?》
Book 25	November 21, 2016	285th episode "Buckwheat jelly and Glutinous rice cake!"; 286th episode "Salted baby octopus on Valentine's Day♥"; 287th episode 《The law of beggars》; 288th episode 《What's your blood type?》; 289th episode 《A son and a Daughter》; 290th episode 《Please accept a gift》; 291st episode 《A girl of all envy》; 292nd episode 《Who's the real language destroyer?》; 293rd episode 《I had a ghost dream》; 294th episode 《If you keep something too long, it will X》
Book 26	April 25, 2017	295th episode 《If you raise a daughter well, you don't envy ten sons》; 296th episode 《If pine caterpillars come down from heaven》; 297th episode 《A fantastic sister (1)》; 298th episode 《A fantastic sister (2)》; 299th episode 《My dad is a secret chef》; 300th episode 《Min-ji, a girl with a wild rose》; 301st episode 《Winter smell》; 302nd episode 《Strawberries and Crayons (1)》; 303rd episode 《Strawberries and Crayons (2)》; 304th episode 《Christmas tide》
Book 27	October 25, 2017	305th episode 《The Revenge of New Year's Day》; 306th episode 《I'm a natural》; 307th episode 《The dream of big fish (1)》; 308th episode 《The dream of big fish (2)》; 309th episode 《Doldol~ let's lose some weight》; 310th episode 《Butterfly effect (1)》; 311th episode 《Butterfly effect (2)》; 312th episode 《My hobby is collecting stamps》; 313th episode 《What Happened in Mt. Dalma (1)》; 314th episode 《What Happened in Mt. Dalma (2)》
Book 28	February 25, 2018	315th episode 《The reason why mom can't sleep》; 316th episode 《The team project of betrayal》; 317th episode 《How to Avoid the Heat》; 318th episode 《Another friendship》; 319th episode 《Devil's talent》; 320th episode 《My uncle is an impregnable man》; 321st episode 《The Last Leaf (1)》; 322nd episode 《The Last Leaf (2)》; 323rd episode 《A Cute Thief ♡ A Pretty Thief》; 324th episode 《The battle of poverty》
Book 29	September 28, 2018	325th episode 《What do you want to be when you grow up?》; 326th episode 《Never-ending diet》; 327th episode 《Love is moving》; 328th episode 《The Girls We Love (1)》; 329th episode 《The Girls We Love (2)》; 330th episode 《Dad's drinking habits》; 331st episode 《Funny pajamas party》; 332nd episode 《Tell me your grotesque food》; 333rd episode 《Let's go get mugwort~♬》; 334th episode 《Strange heredity》

== Awards ==
- 2004 Today's Our Comics Award
- 2009 Korea Contents Awards Excellence Award in Comics
- 2010 Korea Content Grand Prize, Popular Animation Special Award
- 2010, 2013, 2016 1st Best Contents by The Ministry of Culture and Tourism
- 2010 4th CableTV Awards Best Picture of the Year Award on the education/children's section
- 2013 Korea Content Awards, Animation Category Minister of Culture and Tourism Award
- 2016 Korea Content Awards, Animation Category Minister of Culture and Sports Award
- Selected as 2018 Excellent Cultural Product (K- ribbon)
- 2021 Selected as the featured product at the Hi Seoul Awards 2021 by Seoul Business Agency
- 2021 Korea Toy Association Awards
- 2023: Confirmed to actively expand overseas as Korea's representative animation in Taiwan, Vietnam, Indonesia, India, Hong Kong, and Thailand
