= Templestay =

Program in South Korean Buddhist temples

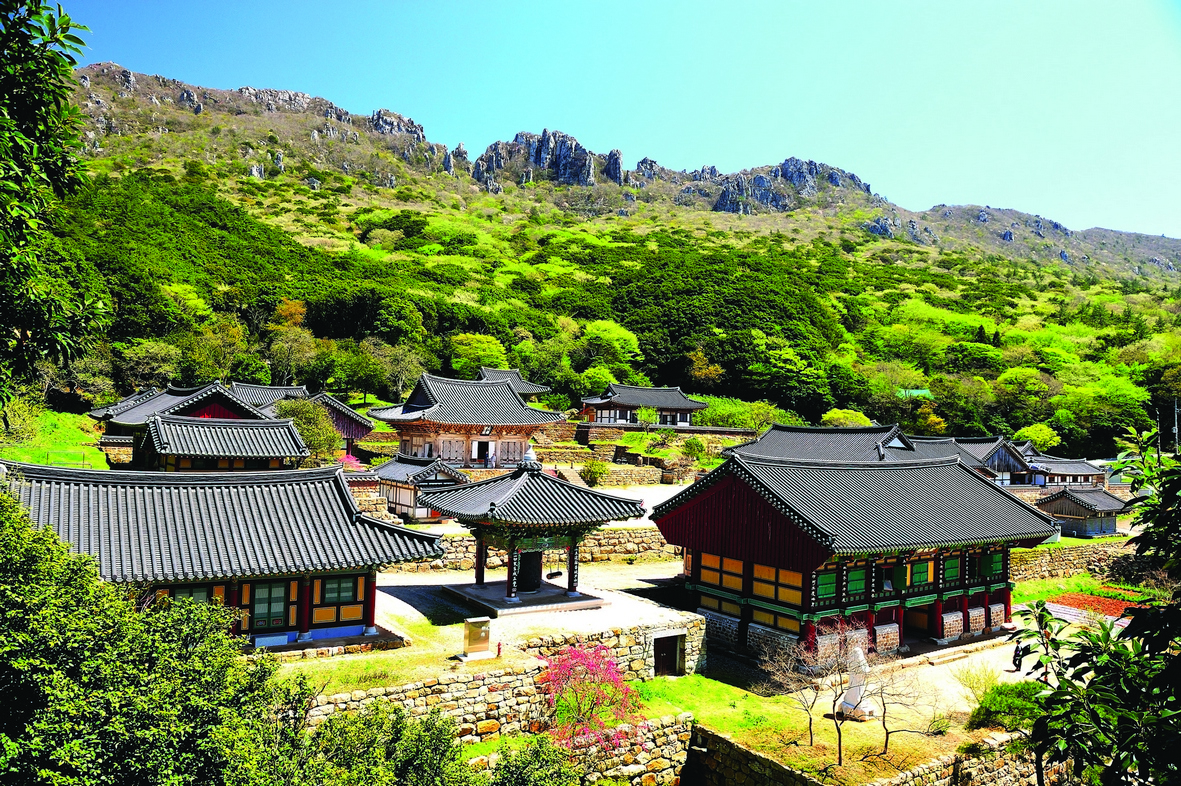
Mihwangsa, an 8th-century temple in South Jeolla Province that guests can stay at

Templestay (Korean: 템플스테이) is a cultural program offered in numerous South Korean Buddhist temples. Templestay allows participants to experience the life of Buddhist practitioners and learn the various aspects of Korean Buddhist culture and history through stories told by monks. The Templestay program was first proposed by Professor MooHyung Chung and has been operating since the 2002 FIFA World Cup.

== Origin ==
Templestay is an experiential program in Korean Buddhism initiated by the Jogye Order of Korean Buddhism at the onset of the 2002 World Cup. During its 1,700 years of history, Korean Buddhism has preserved and passed down Ganhwa Seon practice, a kind of Seon (Zen) meditation. Every year during the retreat seasons of summer and winter, about 2,500 monastics enter a 100-day meditation retreat in one of the 100 temples nationwide. This is a unique Korean tradition in the sphere of Mahayana Buddhism.

This tradition has influenced the architectural layout of temples and monastic life over the years, and one can attain inner calm and peace of mind and body at any of these temples. In their effort to transform the 2002 World Cup into a cultural opportunity, the Jogye Order of Korean Buddhism decided to open their temple gates during the games and allowed both Koreans and non-Koreans to stay in one of their mountain temples.

As a result, in the 30 days the World Cup lasted (May 31, 2002 to June 30), 1,000 foreigners and 10,000 Koreans experienced the Templestay program. That was a sizable achievement, but more importantly, Korean Buddhism and the Templestay program became known to the wider world as major international media, including CNN, the New York Times, BBC and NHK, paid growing attention and reported feature stories about them.

After the end of the 2002 World Cup, the Jogye Order of Korean Buddhism announced the permanent establishment of the Templestay program on July 2, 2002. The Order then established the Cultural Corps of Korean Buddhism on July 16, 2004 as an operative body to run the Templestay program. As the national government promised budget support, the number of temples operating a Templestay program grew from 31 in the first year to 110 in 2015.

The Templestay program is now recognized as one of the major tourist programs in Korea. In 2009, the OECD selected the Templestay program as one of the five most successful combinations of culture and tourism. According to statistics issued by the Cultural Corps of Korean Buddhism on May 29, 2011, a total of 700,000 people have experienced Templestay in the decade following 2002 when the program began.

== Common activities ==
=== Tour ===
In most temples this is the very first item on the schedule for Templestay participants. The aim of this guided tour around the temple for first-time visitors is to get to know the age-old traditions and culture of temples as well as the monastic lifestyle of Buddhist monks and nuns. In this way, participants are shown where the temple dining hall and public restrooms are and so they feel more at home. As they are led through the various buildings and structures of the temple, they discover firsthand the beauty of monastic architecture, paintings, handicrafts and landscaping, and so see many things that they might have otherwise missed. The guide often tells ancient stories behind many of the buildings and art as well as the temple itself.

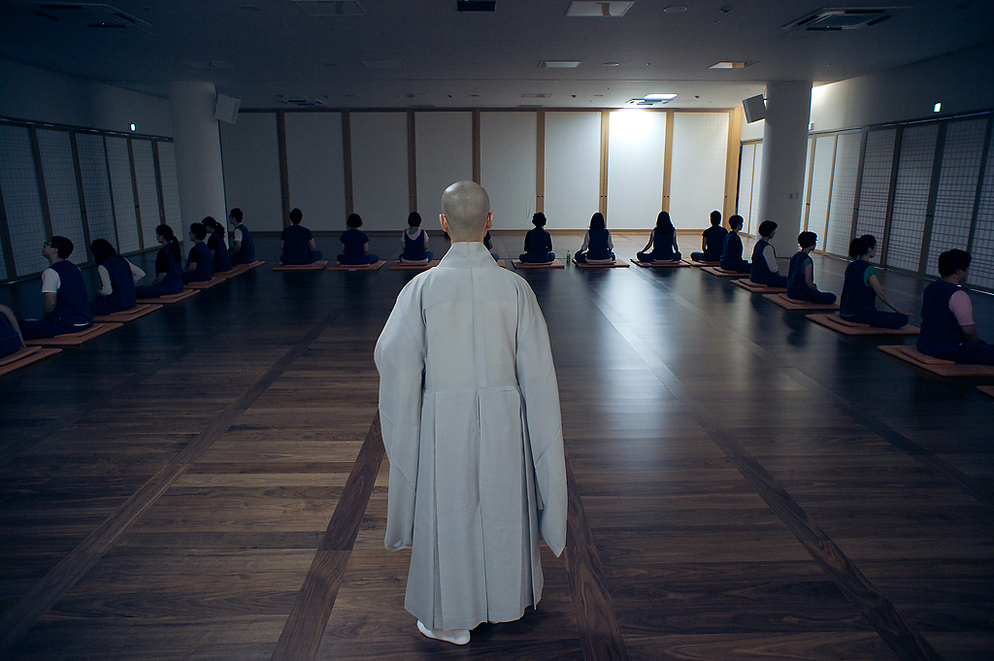
Chamseon (zen practice)

=== Seon meditation (chamseon) ===
Seon meditation (chamseon) is similar to other forms of meditation. However, it does differ in one particular respect and that is that chamseon’s goal is to achieve single-minded absorption through the illogical doubt raised by a hwadu (the punch-line to a koan) so that the rambling mind is momentarily quieted. It is one of the most important practices of Korean Buddhism. A chamseon session usually consists of 50 minutes of Seon meditation followed by 10 minutes of slow and fast walking (pohaeng or gyeonghaeng). Depending on the temple and the program, longer or shorter periods of meditation are offered in which participants learn the aim and method as well as correct posture.

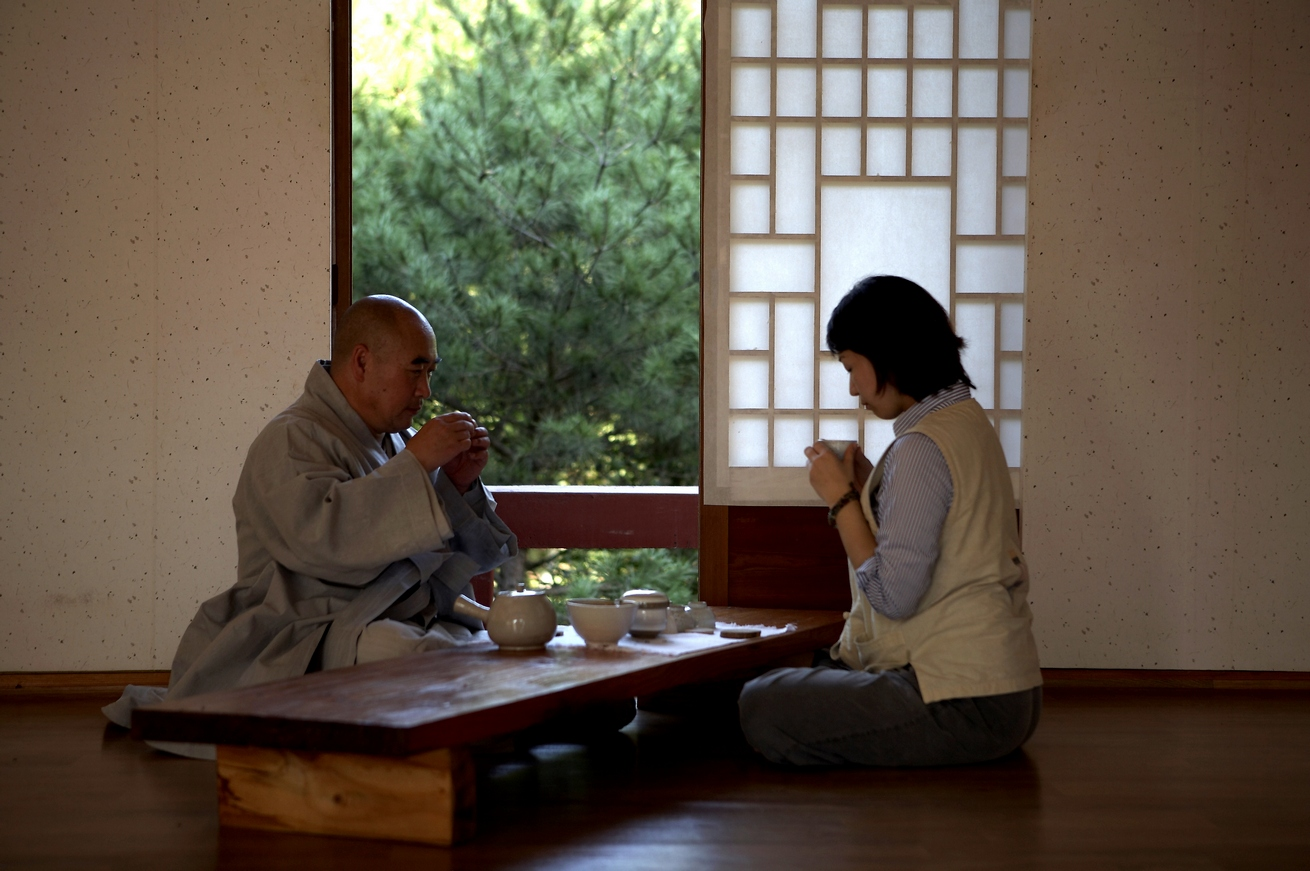
Conversation over Tea with Monastics

=== Conversation over tea with monastics (chadam) ===
Sometime in the afternoon or evening, when monastics are not so busy with daily tasks, one of them invites the Templestay participants to drink tea. For monastics, all aspects of the day are a part of Buddhist practice, and drinking tea is considered an important one. This is the time for participants to enjoy a moment with monastics while asking questions about temples or monastic life or even requesting advice about how to live better. Participants may have the opportunity to view the world through the eyes of Buddhist practitioners and even reassess their own lives and improve their well being.

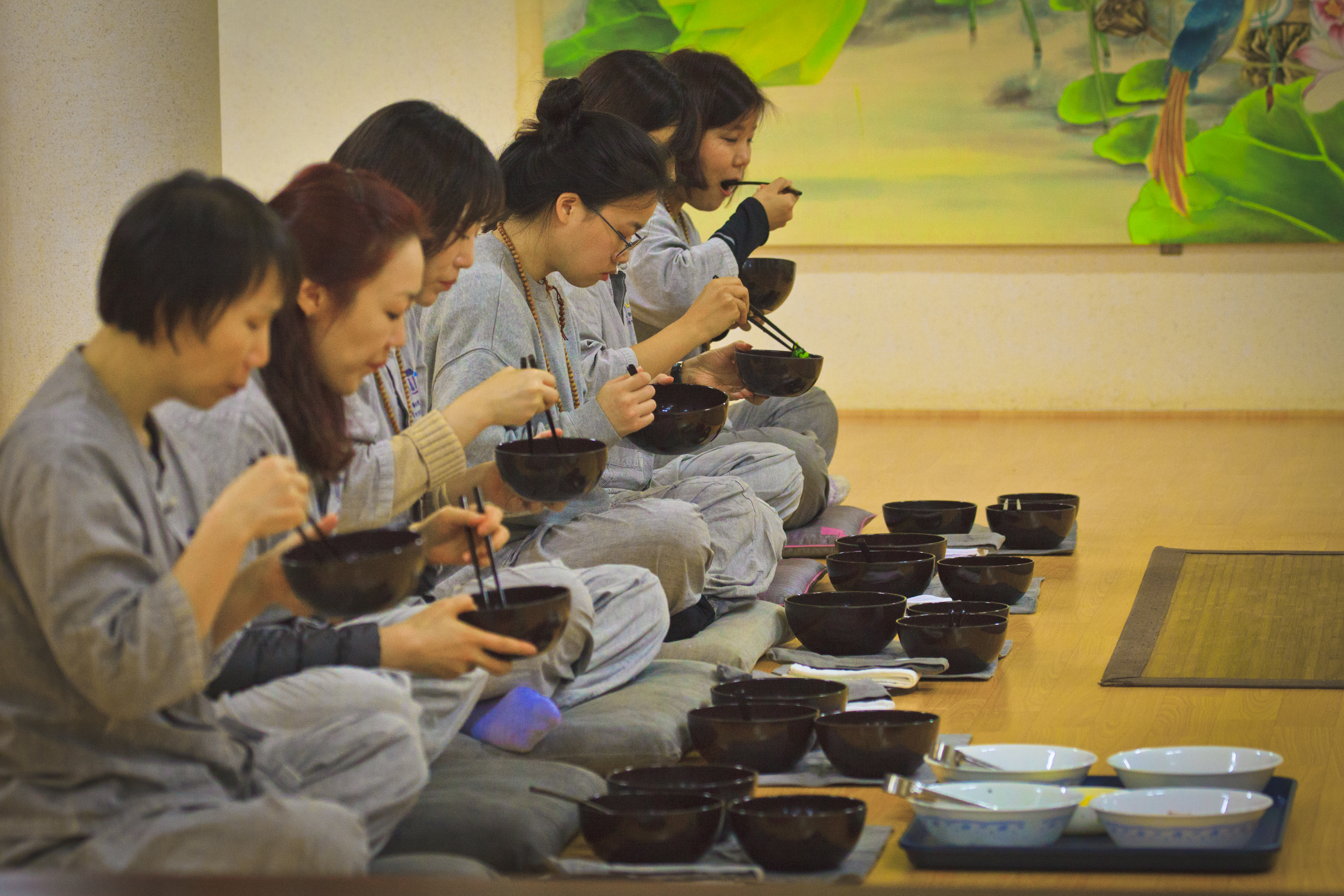
Eating monastic meals (Baru Gongyang)

=== Eating monastic meals (baru gongyang) ===
In Korean Buddhism, "gongyang" means "offering." During a meal one reflects deeply on the countless people and efforts that have brought the food that one receives. In this way, one learns to be grateful for even a single spoonful of rice.

Before the meal, everyone recites a verse which teaches participants how to reflect upon the Buddha’s teachings that are embodied in the act of receiving food. Everyone eats from a set of bowls called "baru" as monastics do, and they are told not to waste a single grain of rice out of respect for the offering.

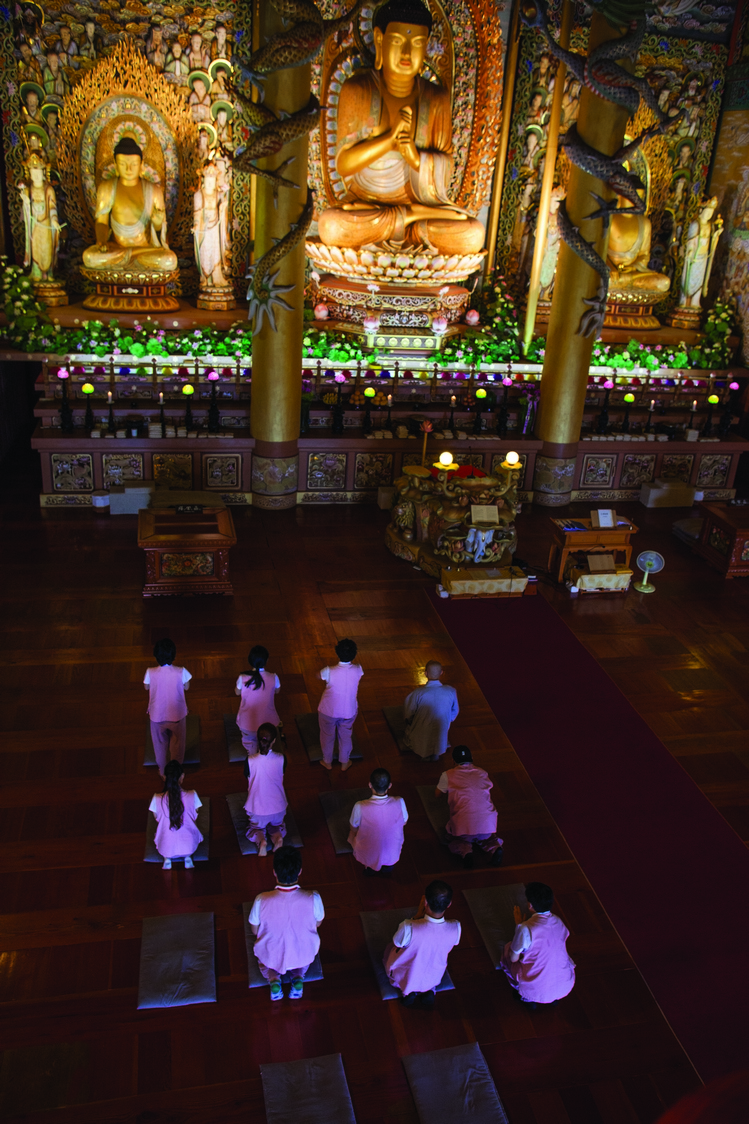
Buddhist Ceremony

=== Buddhist ceremonies (yebul) ===
In the daily routine of Korean temples, the most important event is the Buddhist ceremony called yebul. This ceremony refers to paying respect to the Buddhas enshrined in the Dharma halls three times a day and repeating the teachings, usually before dawn, 10 a.m., and in the evening. Yebul is also called the "ceremony of five fragrances (obunhyangnye)" because participants reaffirm the five virtues that practitioners hope to perfect. Yebul is the ceremony that regulates the day and is attended by everyone possible in the temple compound.

Different instruments are used to symbolically call all beings to join the ceremony. First of all the large bell is sounded, next the drum calls all animals, then the wooden fish for the water-dwelling animals and finally the cloud-shaped gong for the animals of the air. The ceremony continues with a re-affirmation of the refuge we take in the various Buddhas, Bodhisattvas and generations of Seon Patriarchs. Then follows the recitation of the Heart Sutra and the Wishes for the welfare of the temple and all people (Barunmoon).

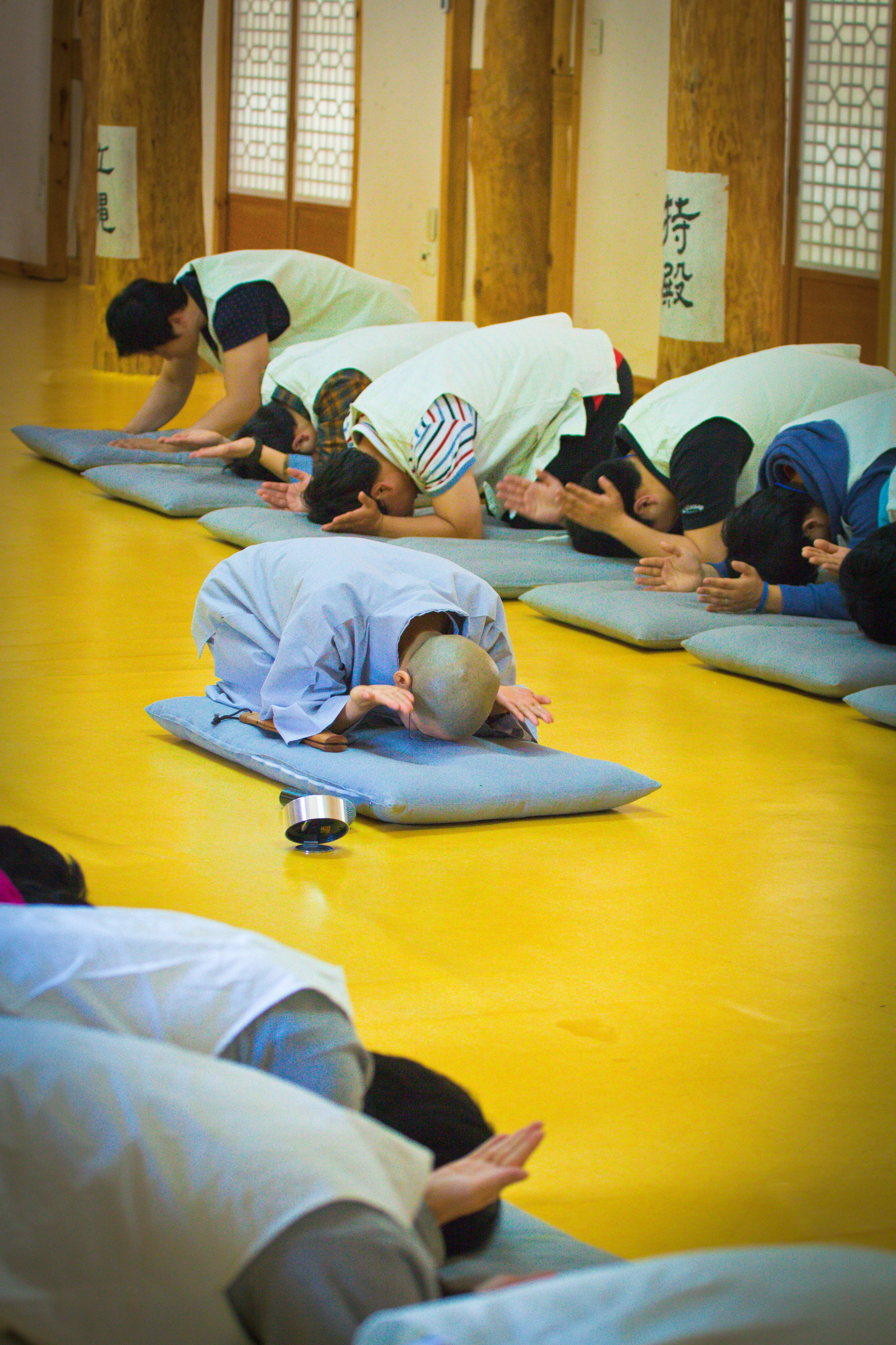
108 Bows

=== 108 bows (Baekpalbae) ===
Another major practice of Korean Buddhism is bowing. This practice consists of 3 bows, 108 bows, 1,080 bows or 3,000 bows and aims at ridding the practitioner of greed and attachment. The 108 bows is an act of atonement for one’s recognized ignorance and cravings, and the 108 kinds of afflictions that arise within them. In this respect, the 108 bows symbolize a fresh start as well and so one empties the illusions one has come to believe to make up one’s "self" and earnestly fills the void with new good intentions.

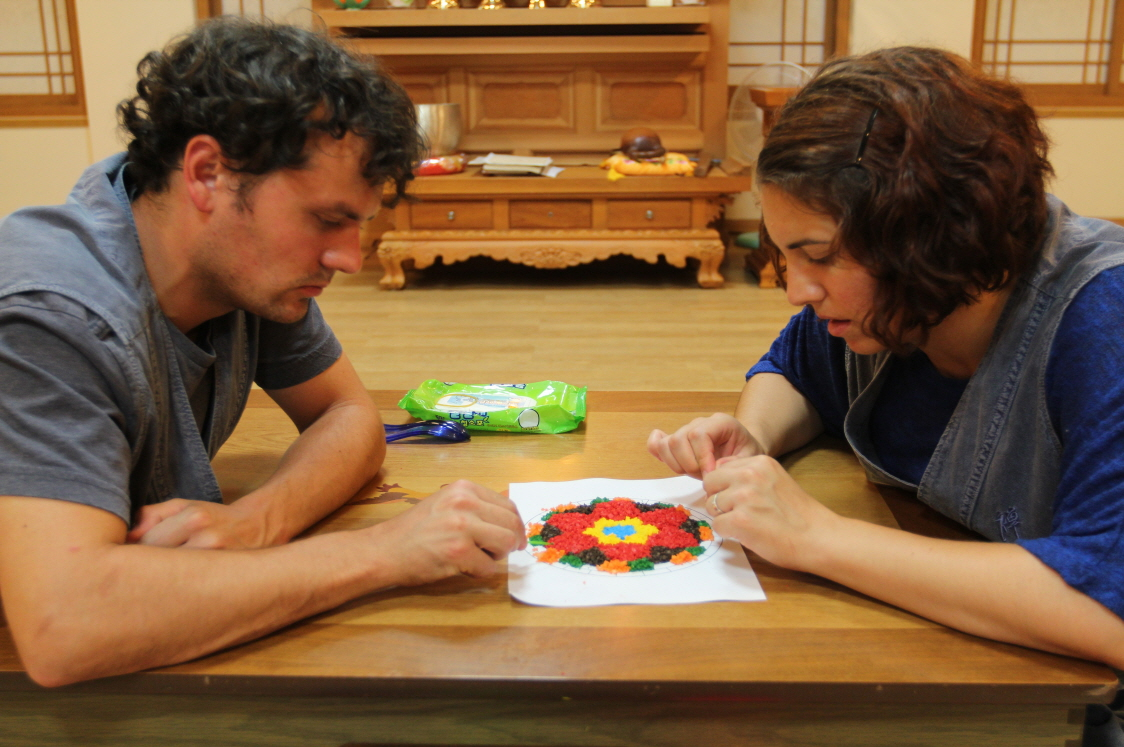
Making Mandala

=== Making lotuses ===
In Buddhism, lotus flowers symbolize Buddha Nature, the potential to become enlightened, which we all possess. Just as lotus flowers are not stained with the mud in which they grow, ignorant sentient beings can reveal their inherent Buddha Nature once awakened.

Korean Buddhism holds the Lotus Lantern Festival every year on the Buddha’s Birthday, which falls on the eighth day of the fourth lunar month. Buddhists handcraft their own lanterns (which are unique to Korean Buddhism), which represent purification and wisdom. The way each petal of thin paper is glued to the paper cup, one by one with great care by Templestay participants, is meant to be a reminder of Buddhists’ fervent wish to persevere in becoming less selfish and more compassionate.

There is also a large lantern parade through the center of Seoul and cultural performances during this national festival.

== Gallery ==
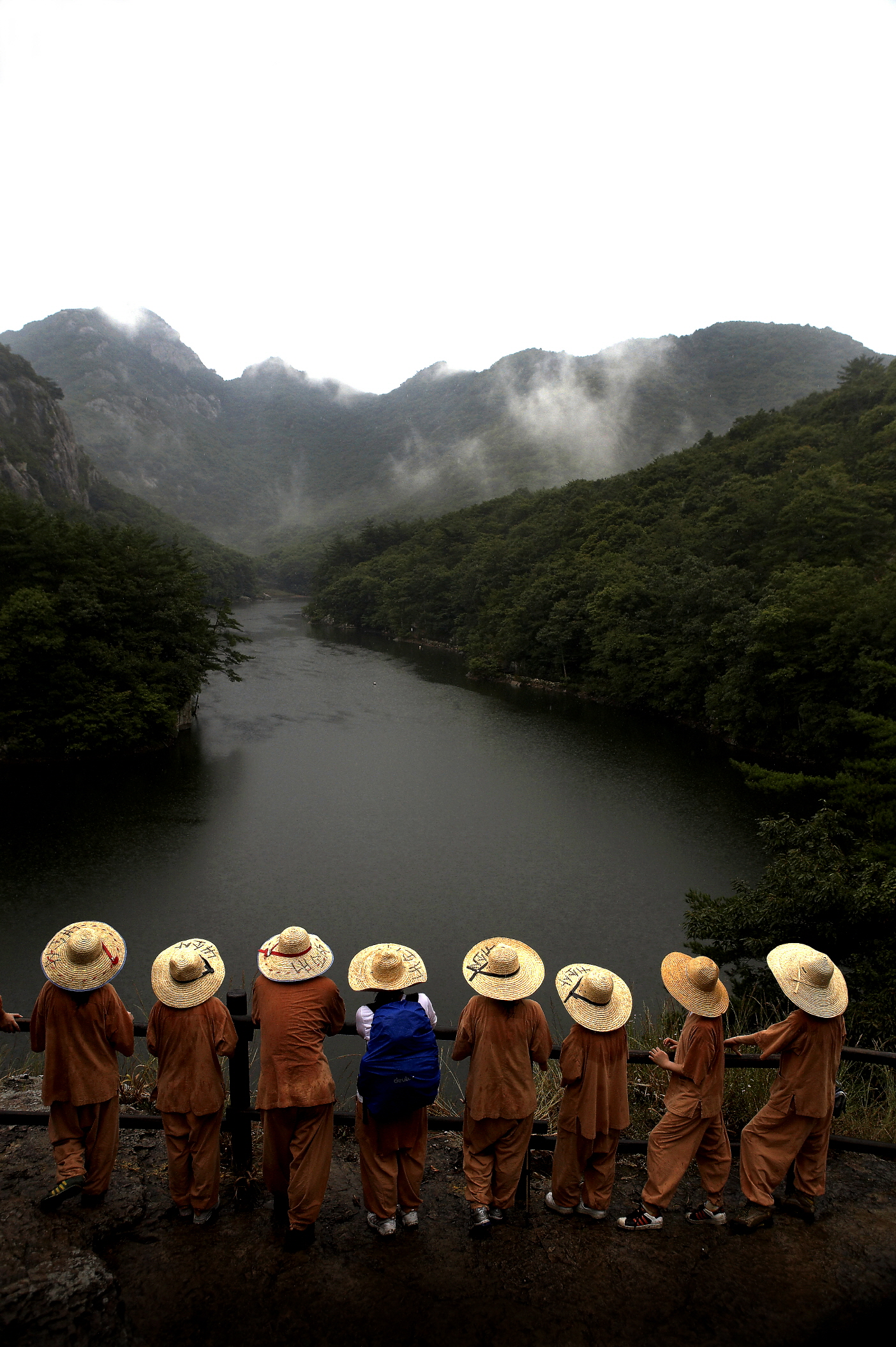

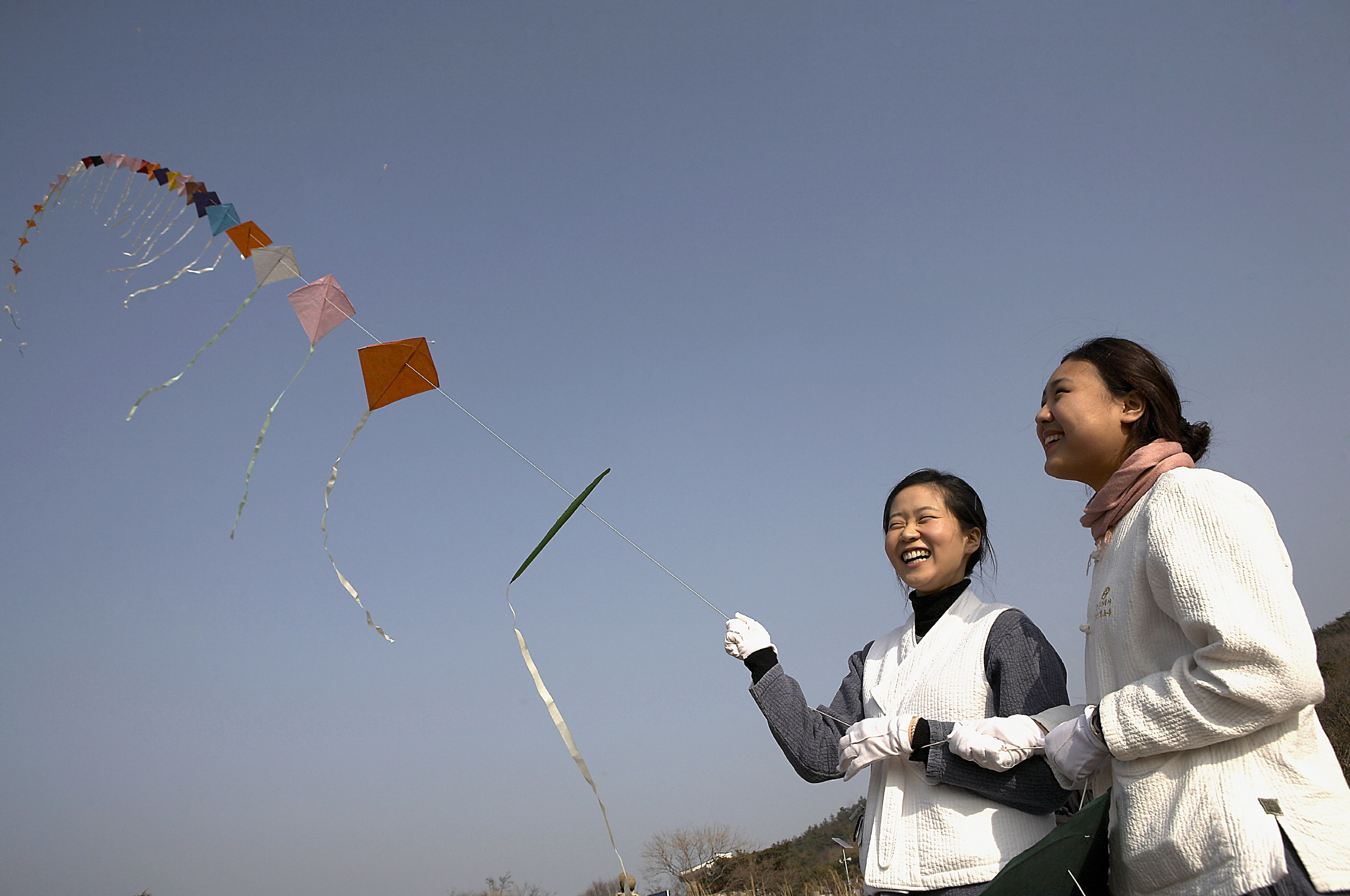

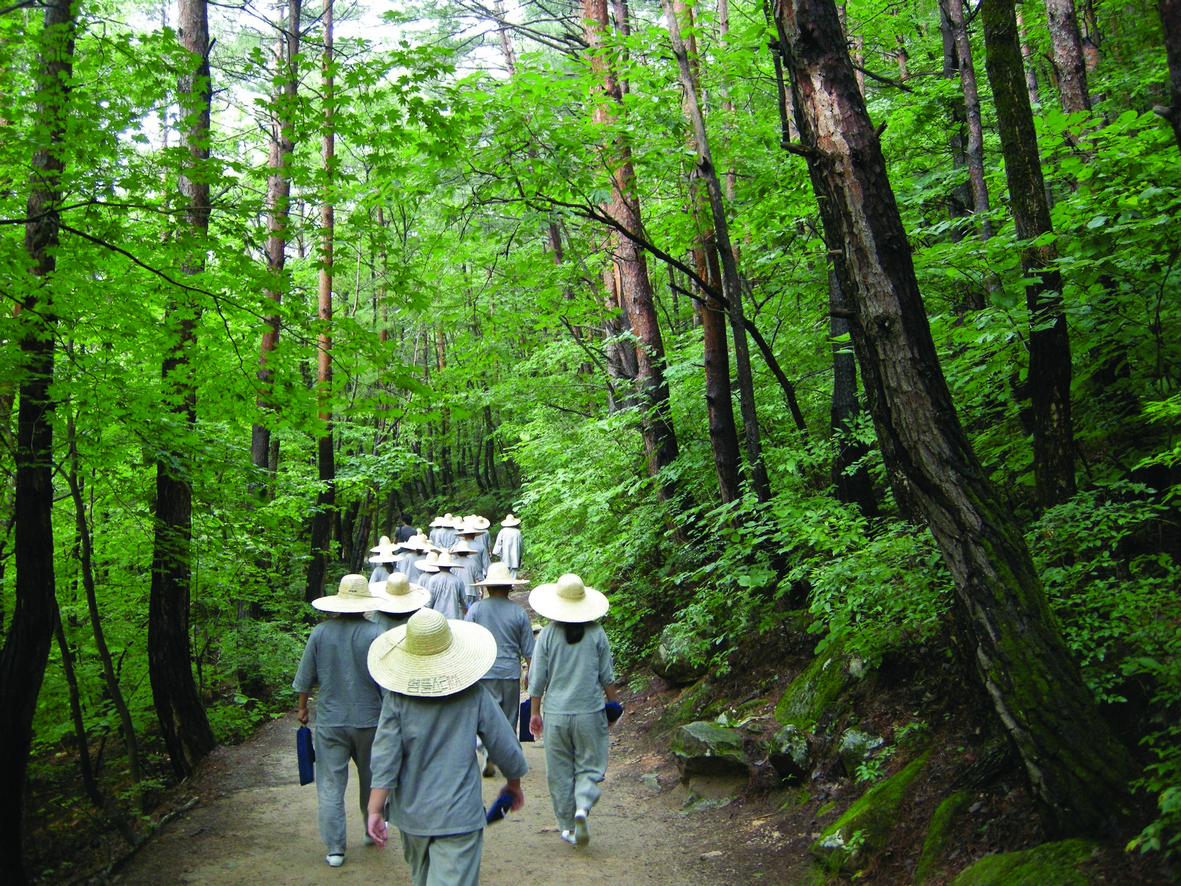

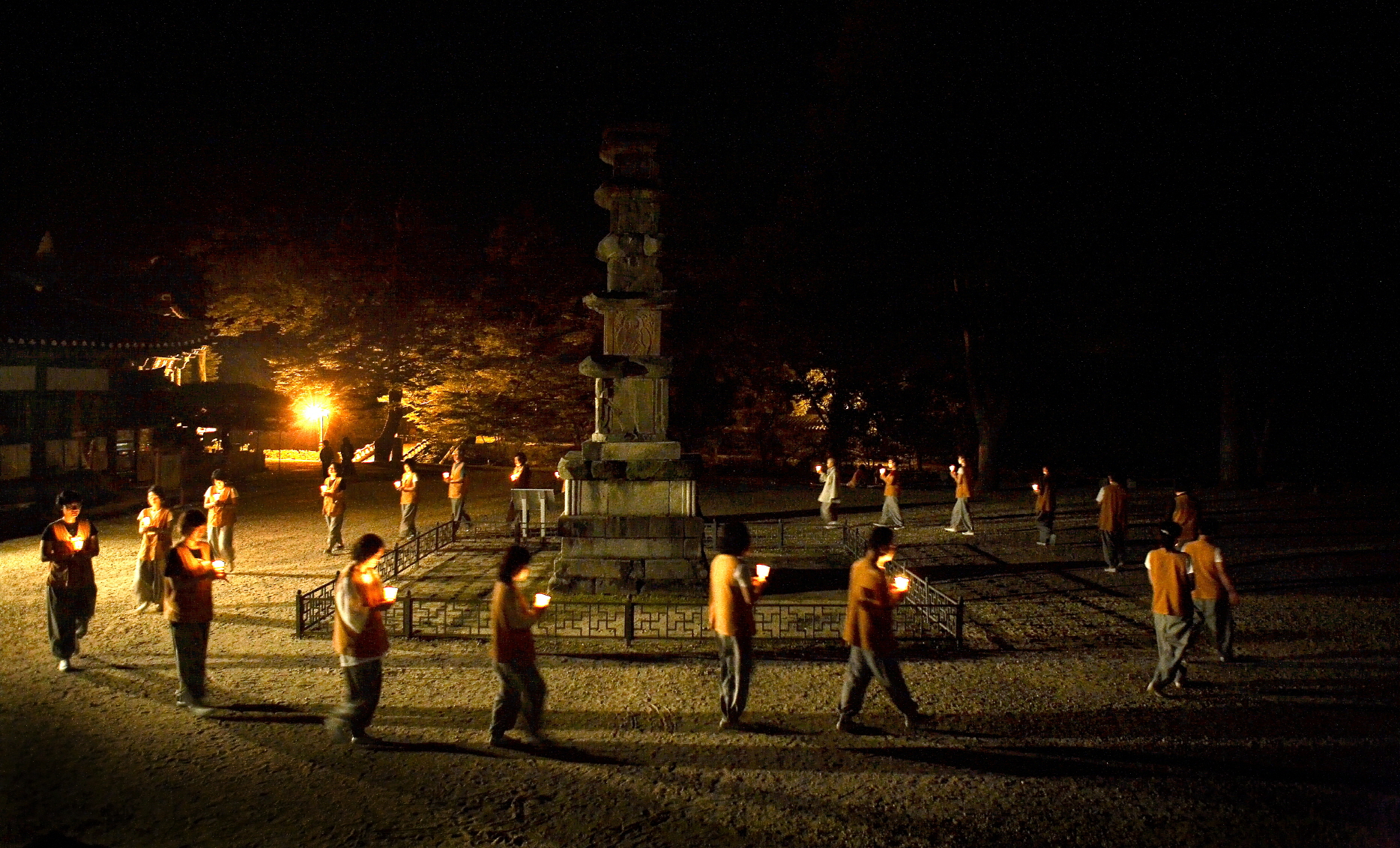

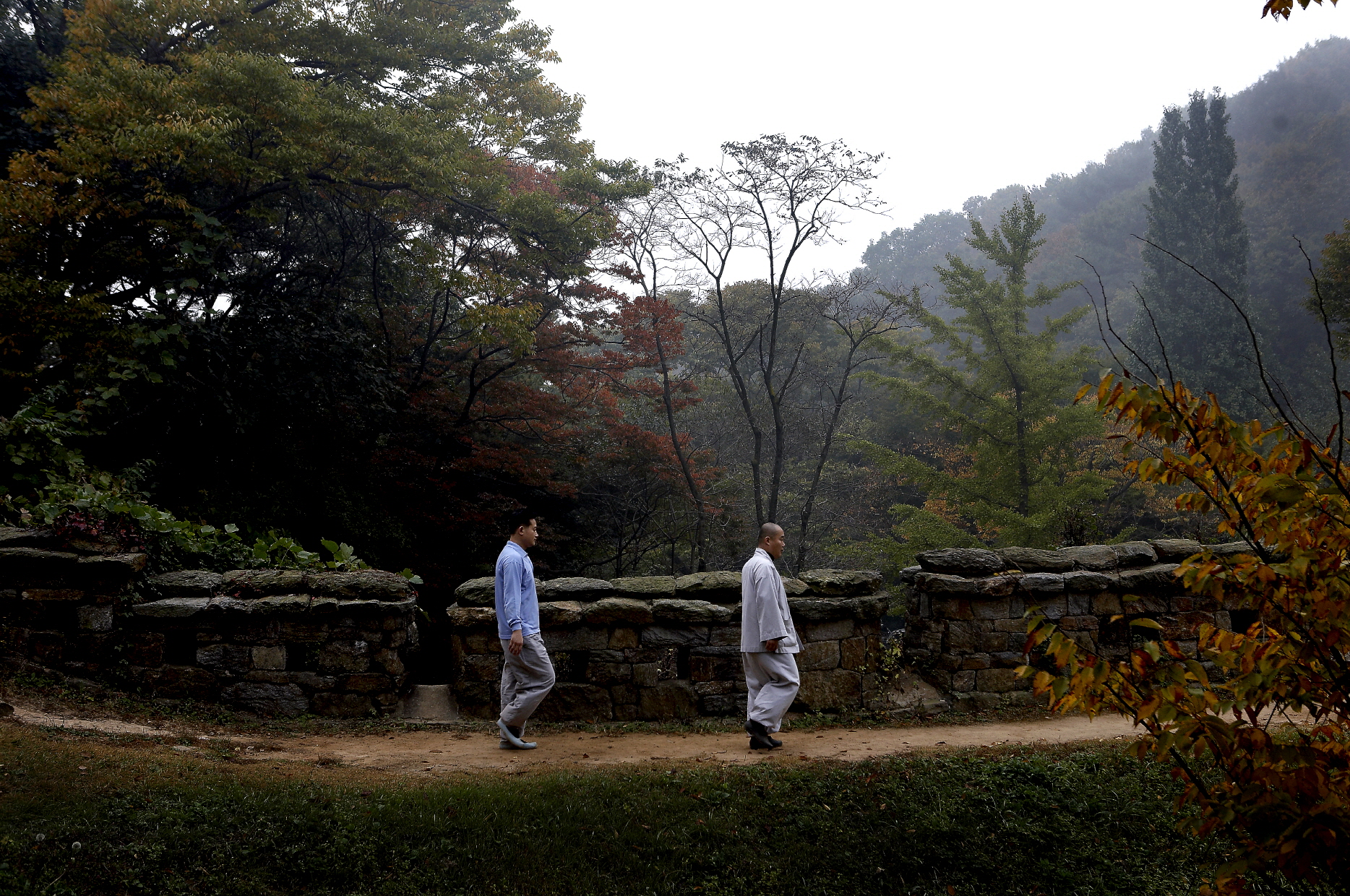

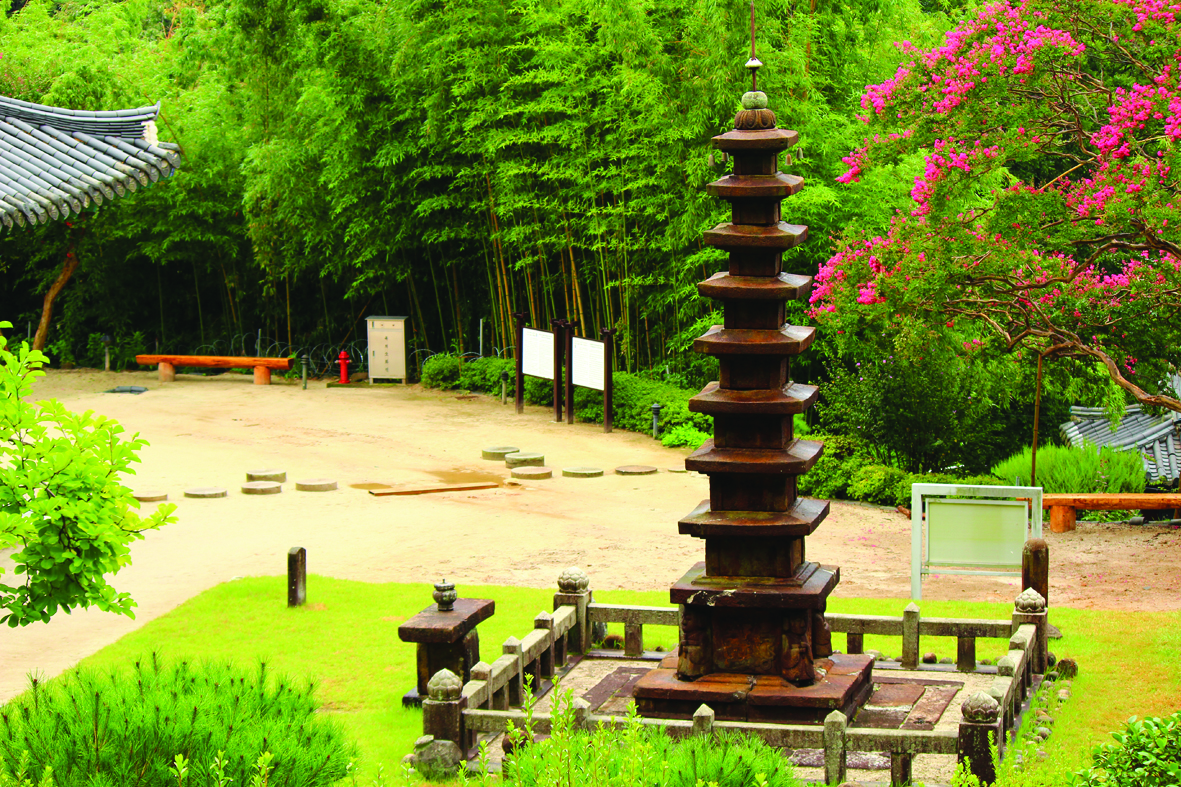
