= Mihwangsa =

Buddhist temple in South Jeolla, South Korea

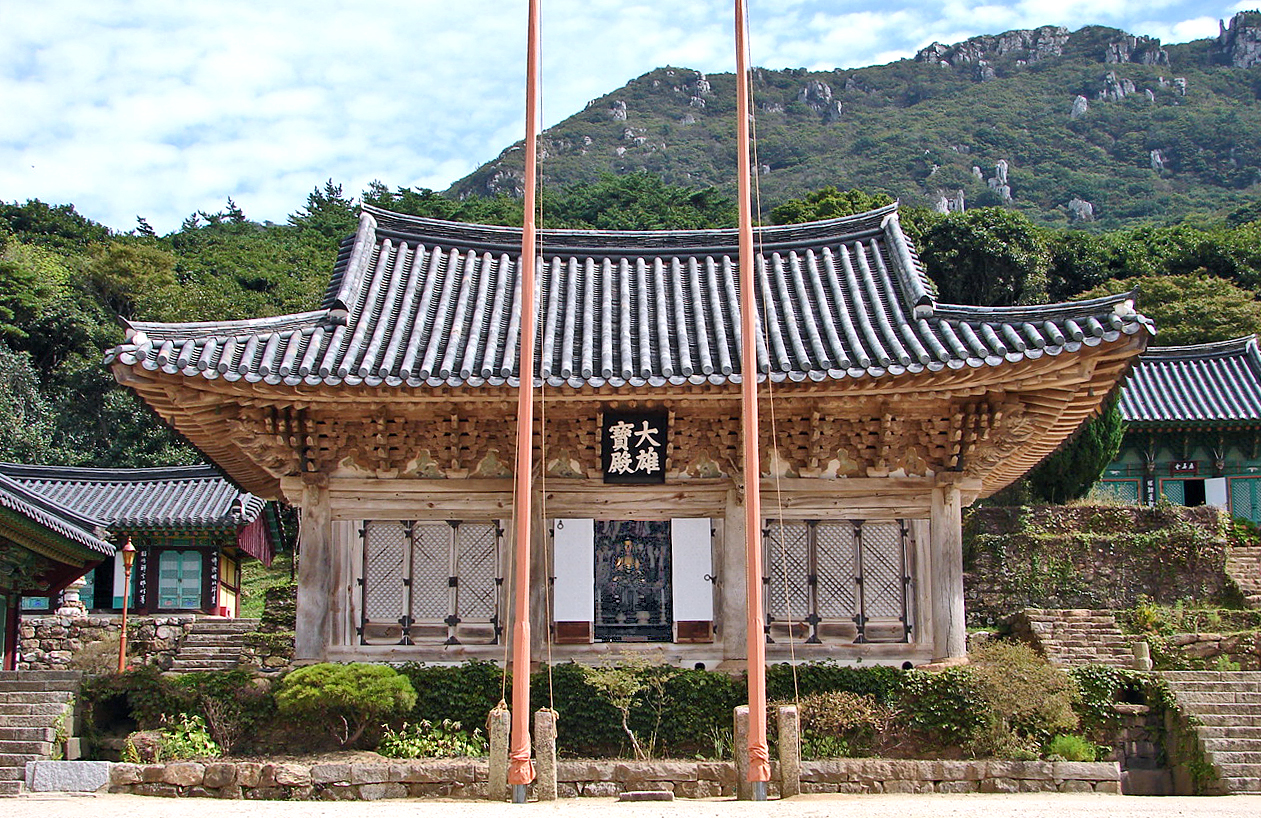
- Daeungbojeon - Main Buddha Hall, is Cultural Treasure #947

- Location within South Korea

Religion
- Affiliation: Buddhism

Location
- State: South Jeolla
- Country: South Korea
- Coordinates: 34°22′58″N 126°34′39″E

Korean name
- Hangul: 미황사
- Hanja: 美黃寺
- RR: Mihwangsa
- MR: Mihwangsa

Mihwangsa (Korean: 미황사) is a Buddhist temple on Dalmasan (Dharma Mountain), nicknamed Geumgangsan (Diamond Mountain) of the Korean Peninsula, Haenam County, South Jeolla Province, South Korea.

Mihwangsa, considered to be the southernmost temple on the mainland, was established in 749 as a branch temple of Daeheungsa, the head temple of the 22nd district of the Jogye Order of Korean Buddhism.

== Founding legend ==
According to the Dongguk Yyeoji Seungram (a geographic book from the Joseon dynasty introducing features of each province in Korea), sometime during the Silla dynasty, a stone ship arrived at the port off the coast of Dalmasan. A man adorned in gold was standing on the ship holding an oar.

People heard beautiful sounds, a heavenly hymn glorifying the Buddha's virtue, coming from the ship. But when they approached the stone ship to investigate, the ship moved back away from the shore. However, when they gave up and turned their backs to leave, the ship would return closer to the shore again.

This went on for several days. Finally the ship anchored at the port after the Great Master Euijo Hwasang, along with two monks and a hundred of the residents, purified themselves and offered up prayers.

On board the ship they found 80 copies of the Avatamsaka Sutra, 7 copies of the Lotus Sutra, the statues of the Vairocana Buddha (Birojanabul), the Manjushri Bodhisattva (Munsubosal), 40 saints, 16 Arahats, 53 great enlightened masters, and 60 nahan (arahants, enlightened disciples of the Buddha), and some altar paintings.

After opening a golden box they broke open the black rock, found on the ship, a tiny black cow emerged from the rock suddenly growing into a large cow.

Latter that night, Great Master Euijo Hwasang had a dream where a man in golden robes came to him said "I am the king of Wujeon Guk (India). The shape of the mountains in this area is auspicious and suitable for a shrine to ten thousand Buddhas. Please place the Sūtras and statues on the back of the cow and establish a temple where it lays down."

The next day Great Master Euijo followed the instructions he had received in the dream and went on a journey. The cow fell when while crossing Dalma Mountain, but got back up again and kept on going. The cow continued on for quite some time before again falling down. But this time the cow did not get back up so Tonggyosa was established where the cow first fell, and Mihwangsa where the black cow fell down the last time.

The temple is named Mi (beautiful) after the pleasing, strangely musical bellow of the black cow, and Hwang (yellow/gold) after the golden robes of the man in Great Master Euijo's dream.

== Treasures ==
=== Daeungbojeon ===
Daeungbojeon, or The Main Buddha Hall has 3 sections in front and 3 sections on the sides. Daeungbojeon employs the dapo style, meaning that the ornate supporting panels between the rafters and the ceiling are constructed on top of the columns as well as between the columns.

Daeungbojeon has a more elaborate design of traditional Korean roof. Viewed from the front, the roof's lower part is rectangular, while its upper part consists of a surface with many parallel grooves in it consisting of a pile of plates of equal thickness arranged stepwise with a constant offset. Viewed from the side, the lower part is the same, while the top part is triangular. Daeungbojeon has ornate protruding corners on the eaves.

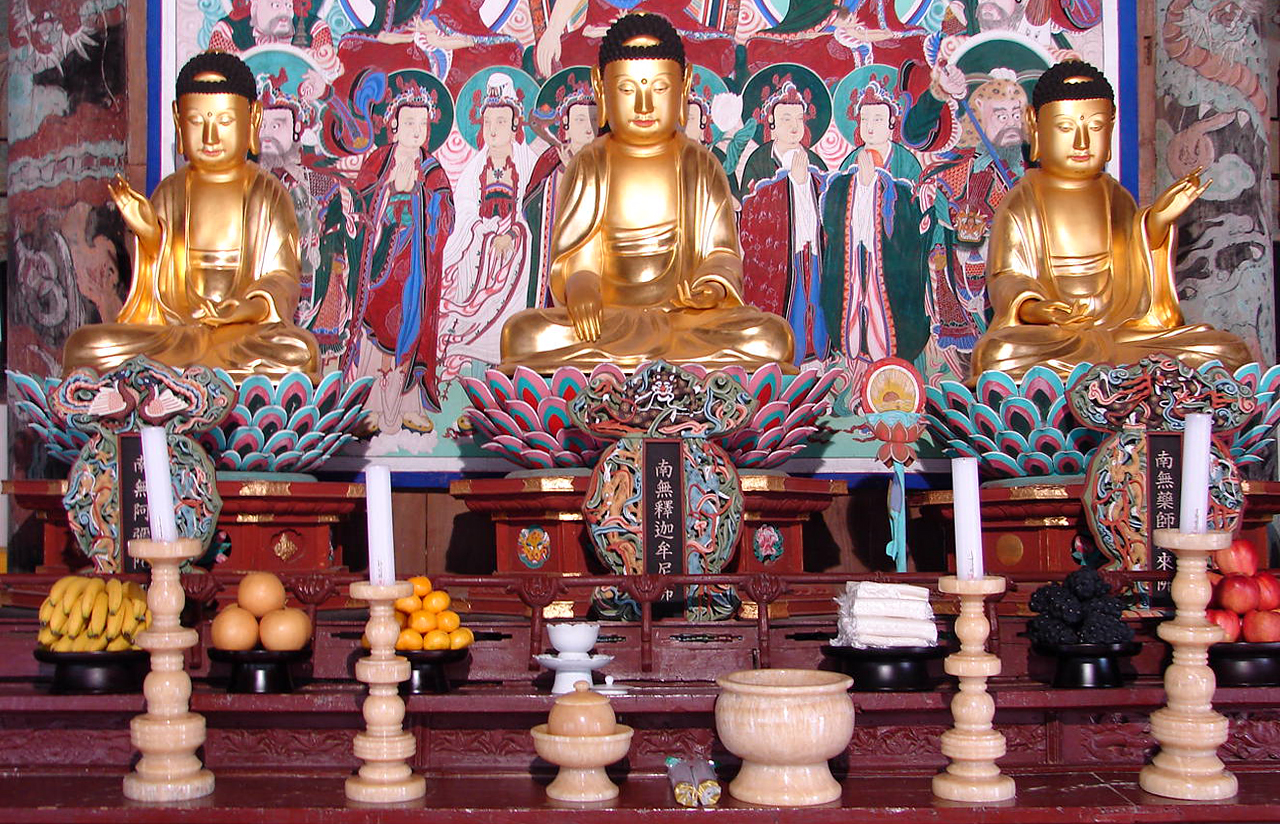

Inside Daeungbojeon, a screen wall is found right behind the Buddha altar. There is a narrow passageway between this screen and the wall of the hall.

There are three wooden Buddha Statues enshrined in the hall. The central Buddha is Seokgamuni Bul (Sakyamuni, the historical Buddha). On either side is Amita Bul (Amitabha, the Buddha of the Western Pure Land), and Yaksa Yeorae Bul (Bhaisajyaguru, the Buddha of Healing and medicine, who presides in the East).

Daeungbojeon is believed to be from the late Joseon period in the mid 18th century, due to the design of its panels. The four walls of the hall are full of images of innumerable Buddhas above the clouds. The highest columns of the hall still retain the original paintings, including lifelike dragons covering the entire surface of the columns.

Daeungbojeon is Cultural Treasure #947.

=== Eungjindang ===
Eungjindang (hall) is also known as Nahanjeon (hall). Eungjin is another name of the Buddha, while Nahan refers to an Arahat or saint who got enlightenment through practice. The Arahat Halls of Korean temples usually have 16 or 500 Arahats. Mihwangsa's Arahat Hall have 16 Arahats in the painting on the main wall. The Buddha's portrait on the wall reflects the 18th century style of Buddhist painting.

Eungjindang has 3 sections in the front and 2 sections on the sides. The roof is much like Daeungbojeon described above. And like Daeungbojeon, has ornate protruding corners on the eaves.

The current Eungjindang was rebuilt in 1751 after all buildings at Mihwangsa were destroyed in the 1590s.

Eungjindang is Cultural Treasure #1183.

=== Mihwangsa Gwaebultaeng ===
Gwaebultaeng is a large banner painting used in Buddhist temples during major ceremonies. Gwaebultaeng at Mihwangsa is from the Joseon dynasty, consisting mainly a large portrait of the Buddha in the center, while the dragon king and queen are depicted in the lower part. The Buddha's eyes, ears, nose, and mouth are rather small, while the unisa (fleshy protrusion, one of the 32 physical signs of the Buddha) is clearly portrayed on the crown of the head.

Mihwangsa Gwaebultaeng, produced in 1727, displays the typical style of the late 18th century depicting the calm and visionary world of the Buddha.

Mihwangsa Gwaebultaeng is Cultural Treasure #1342.

== Mihwangsa Gallery ==
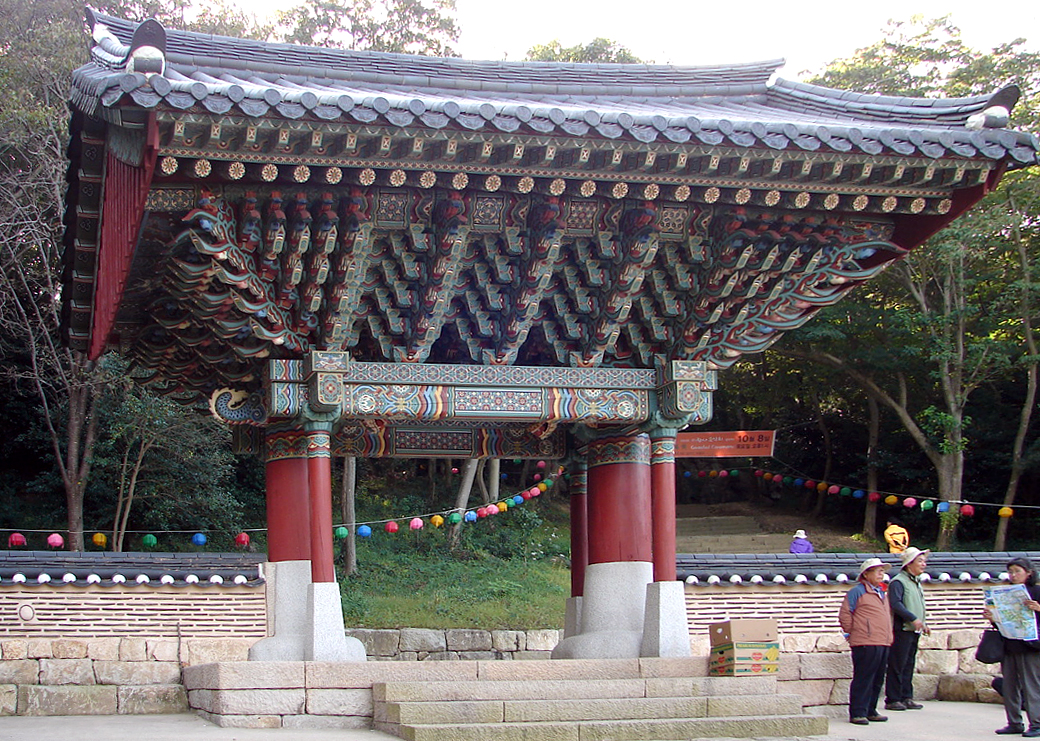

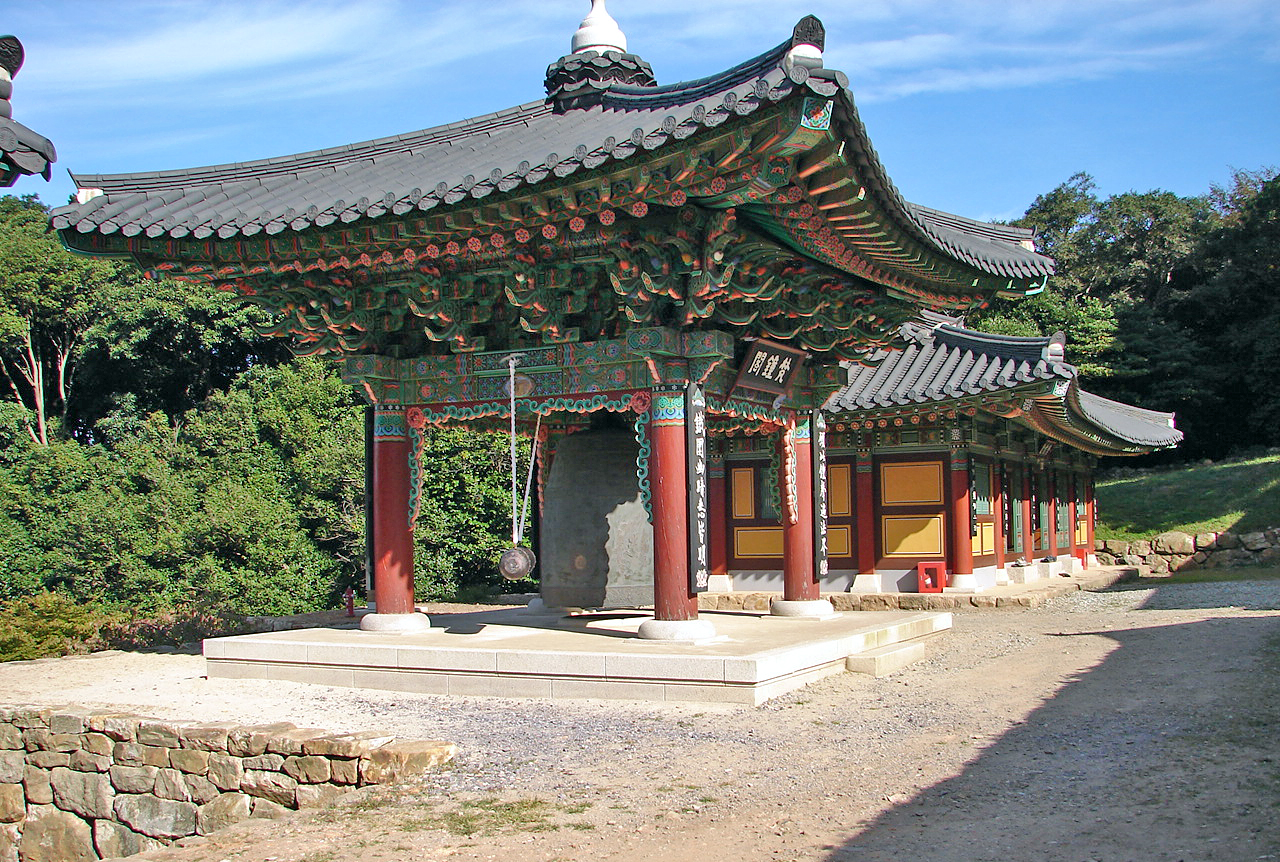

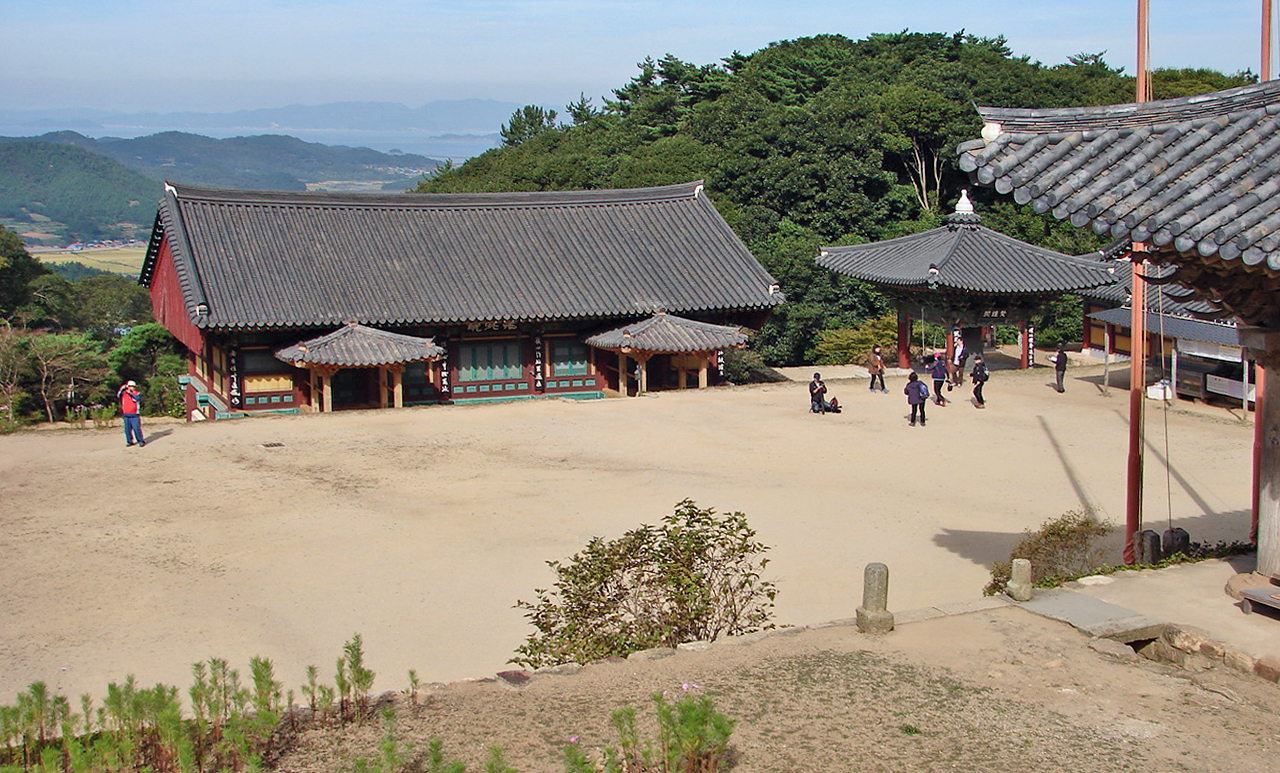

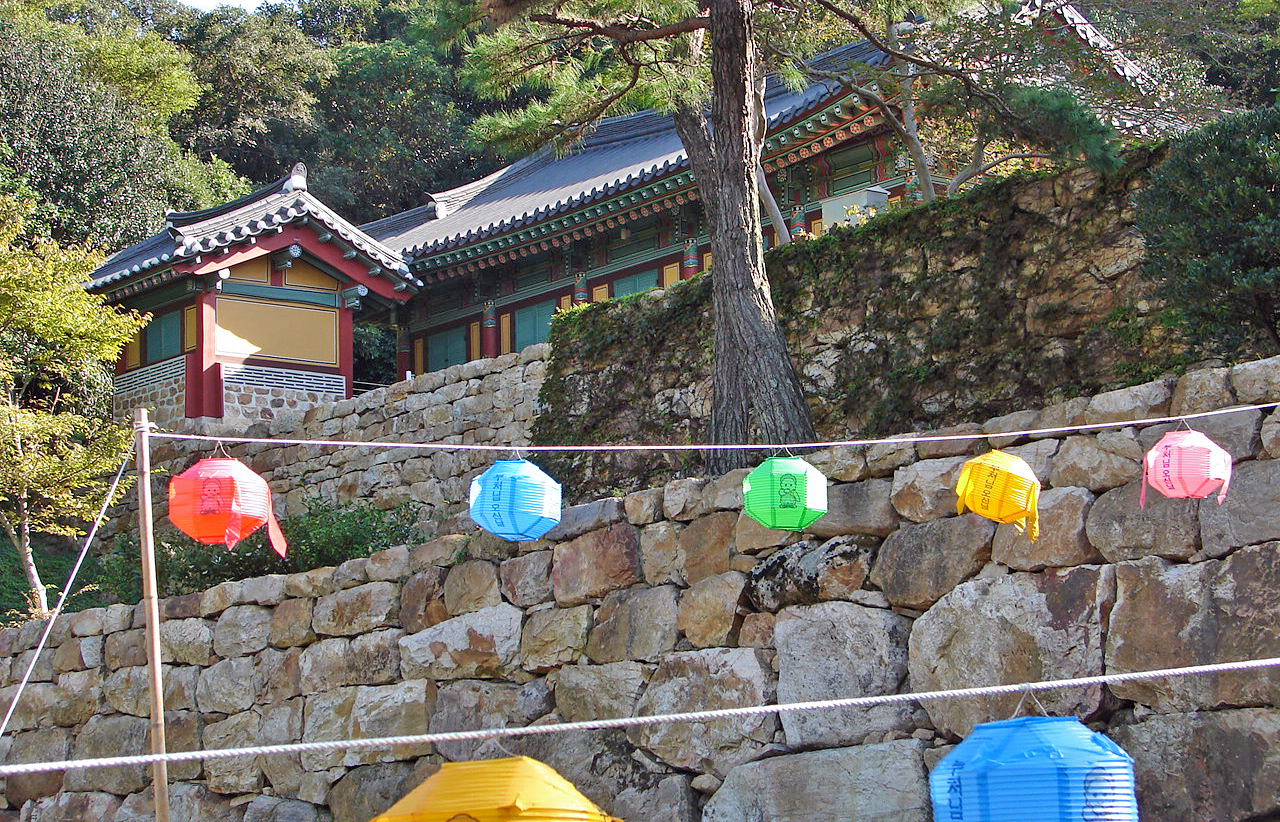

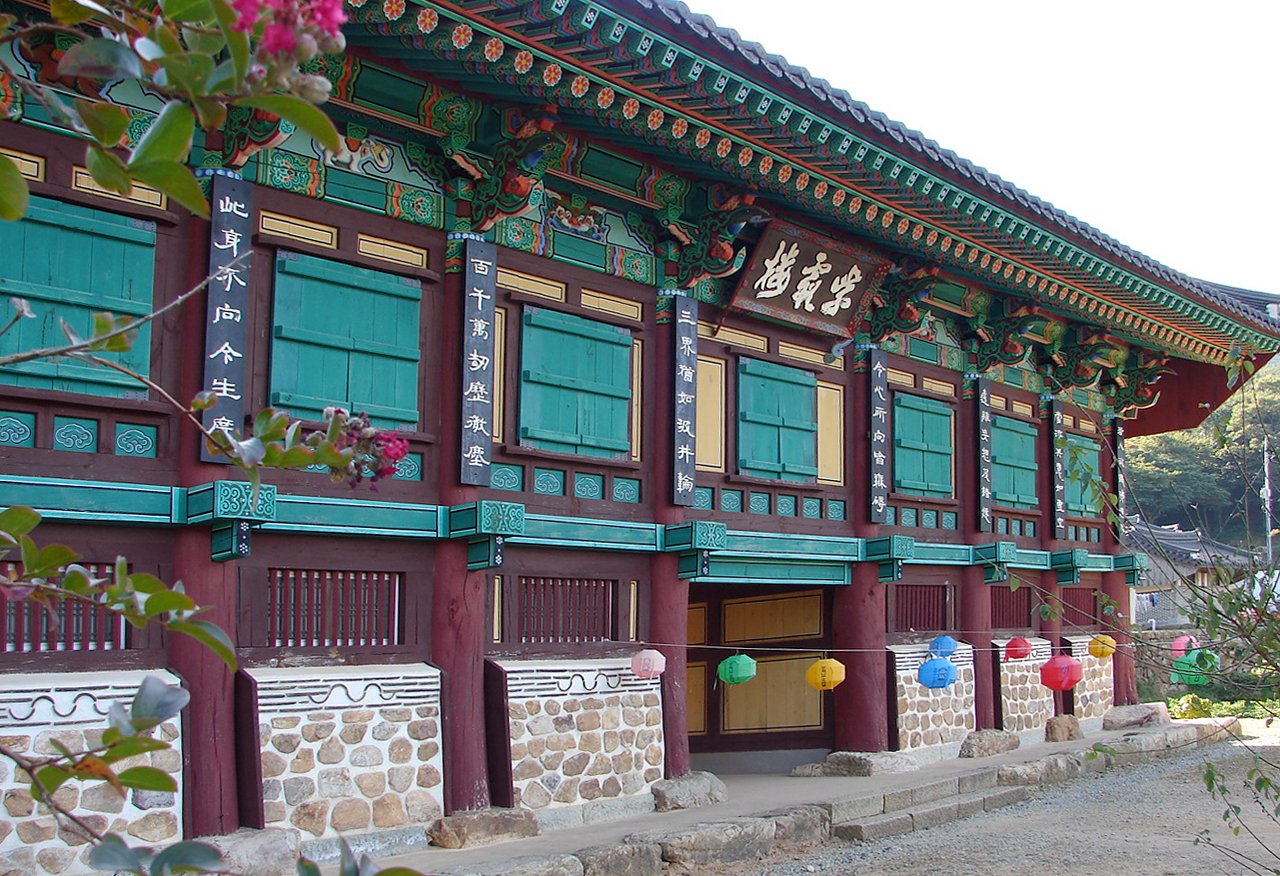

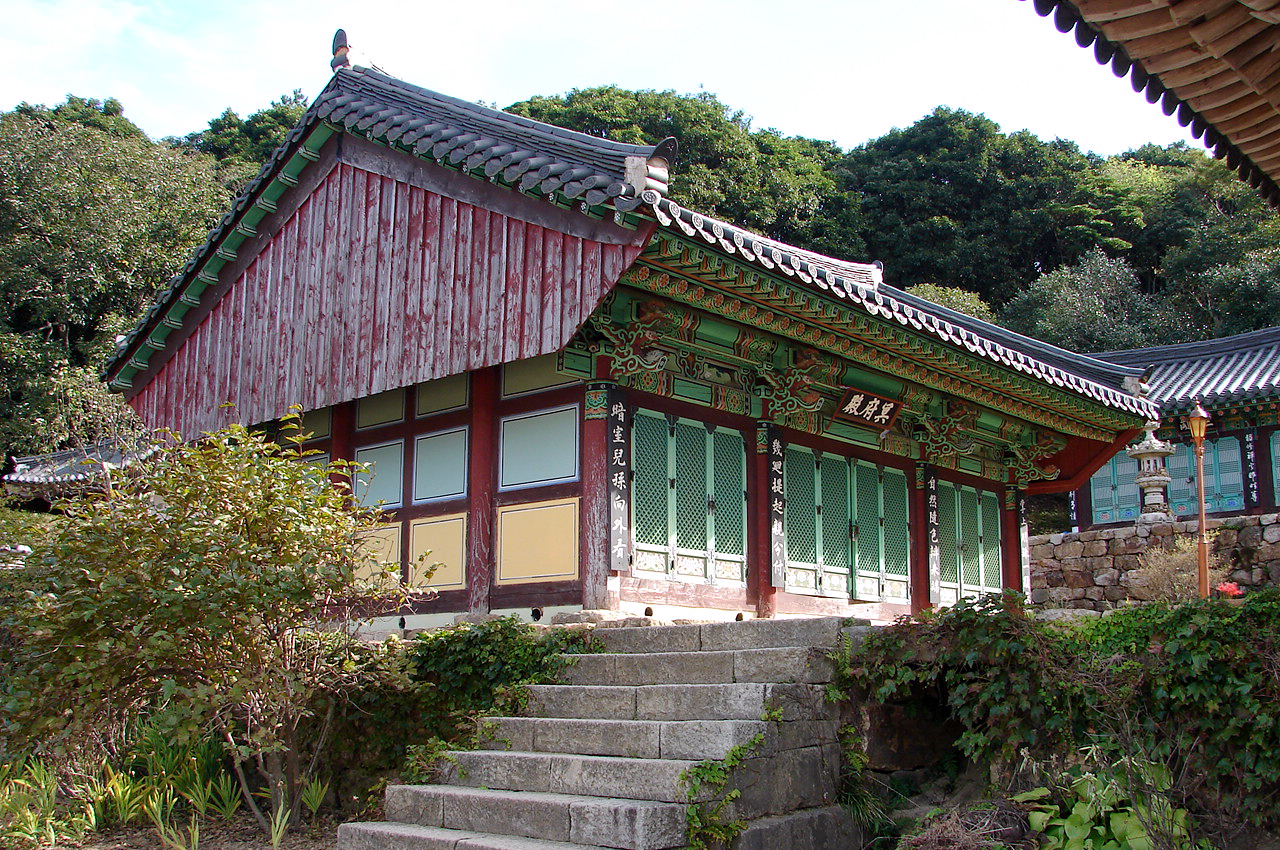

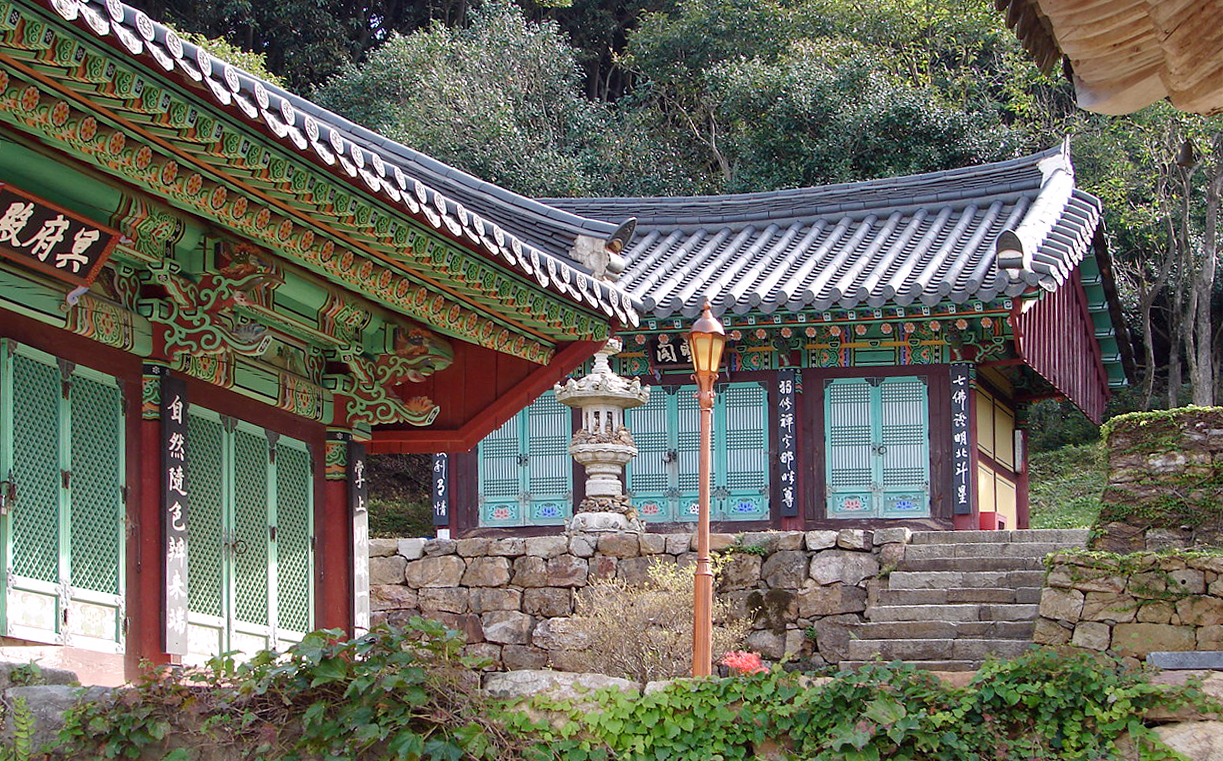

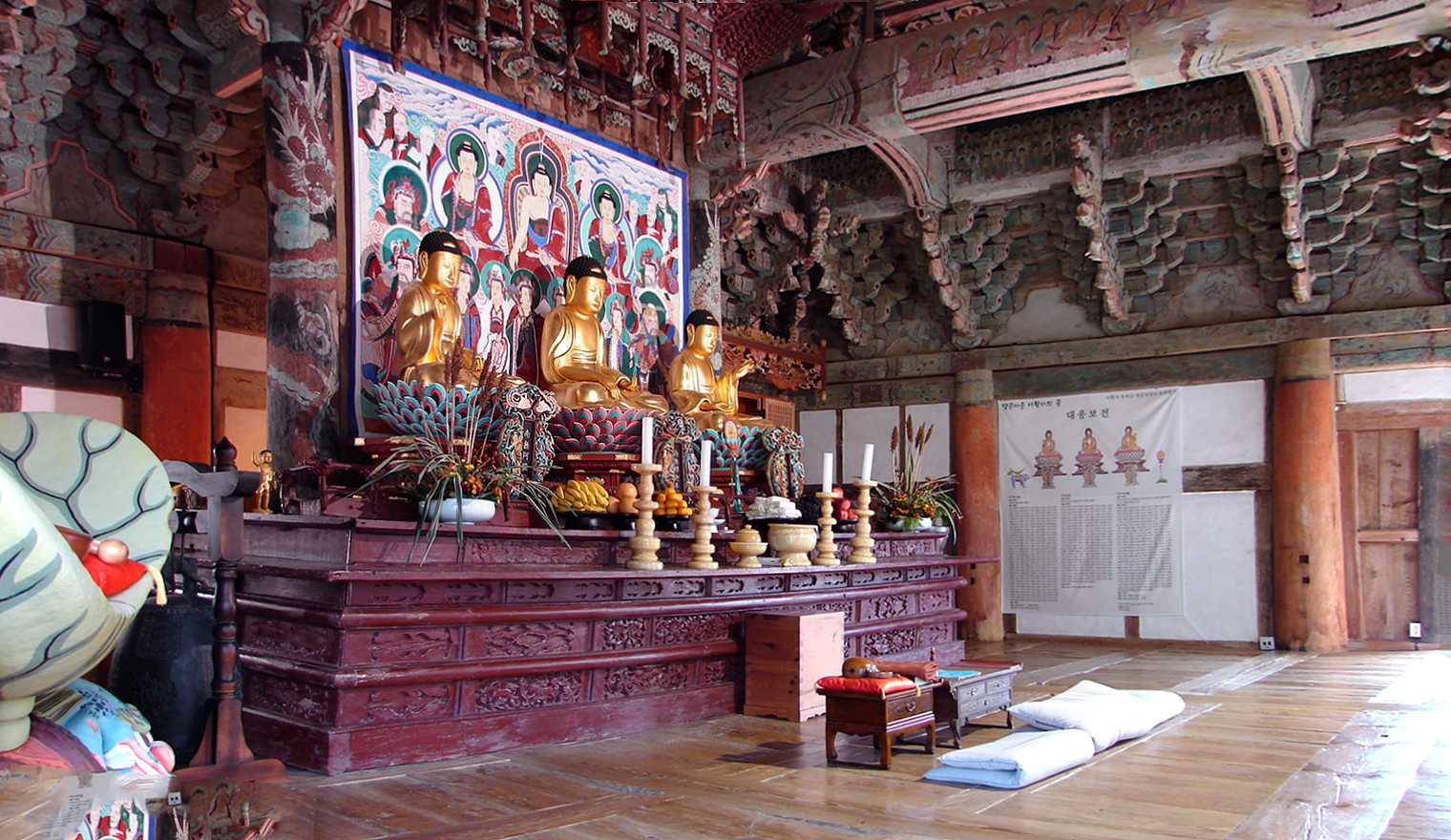

== Hermitages ==
=== Budojeon ===
Budojeon is a hermitage of Mihwangsa near the temple ground use primarily as a training and meditation center for the monks.34.3777264°N 126.5764084°E

==== Budojeon Gallery ====
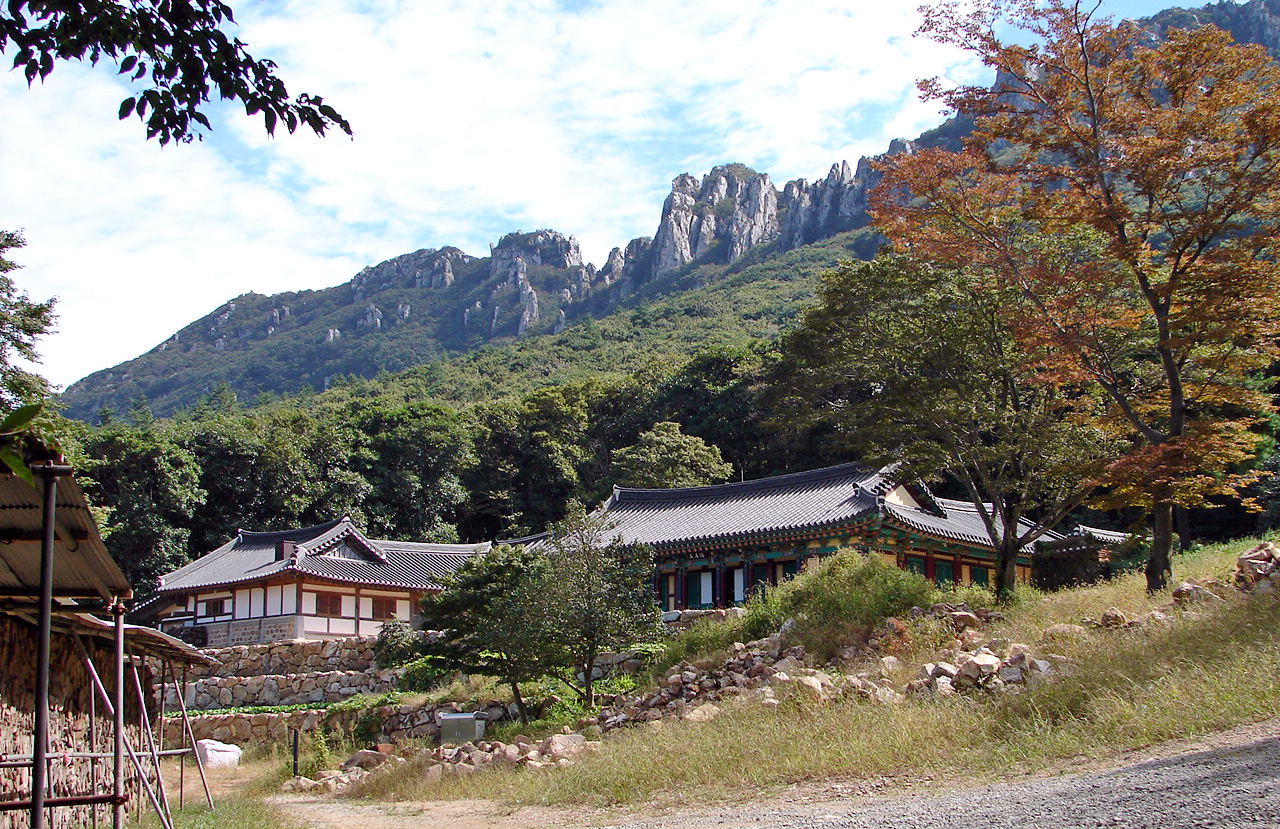

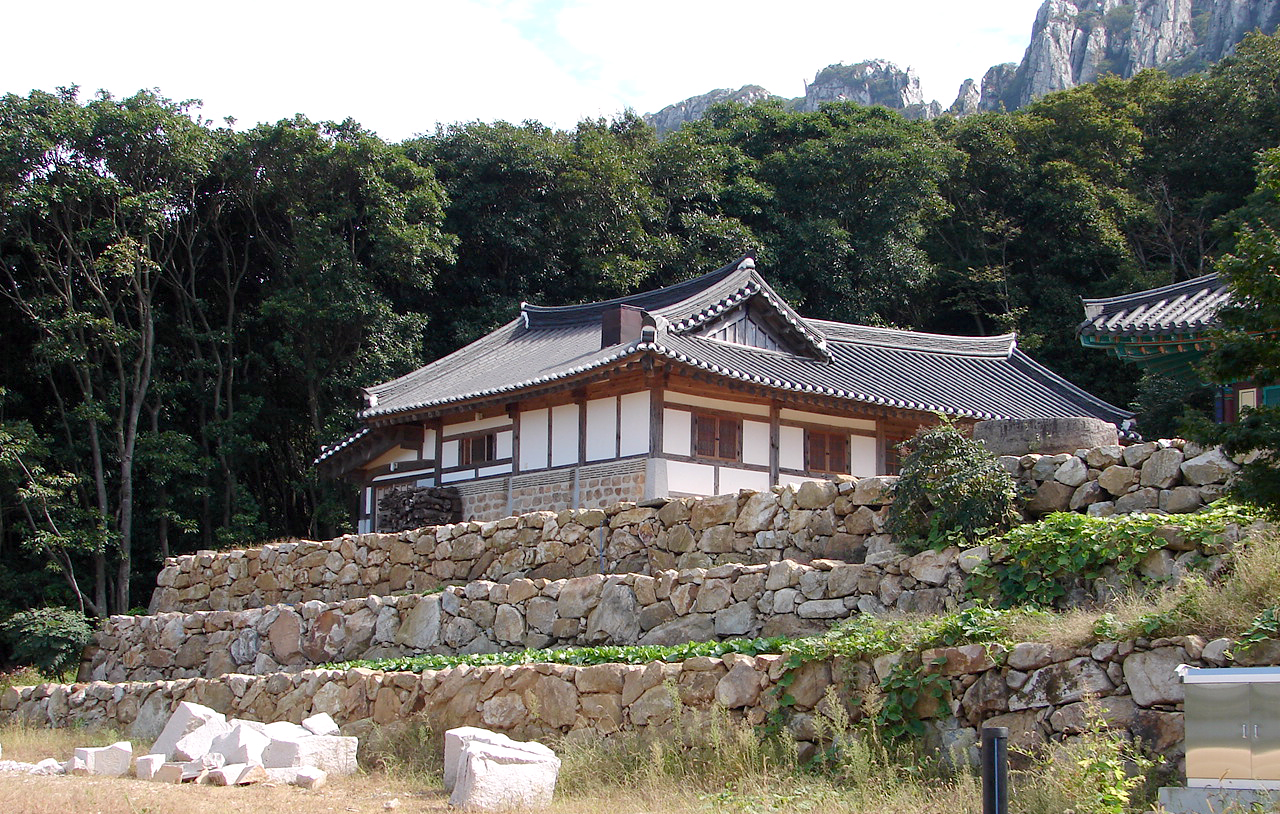

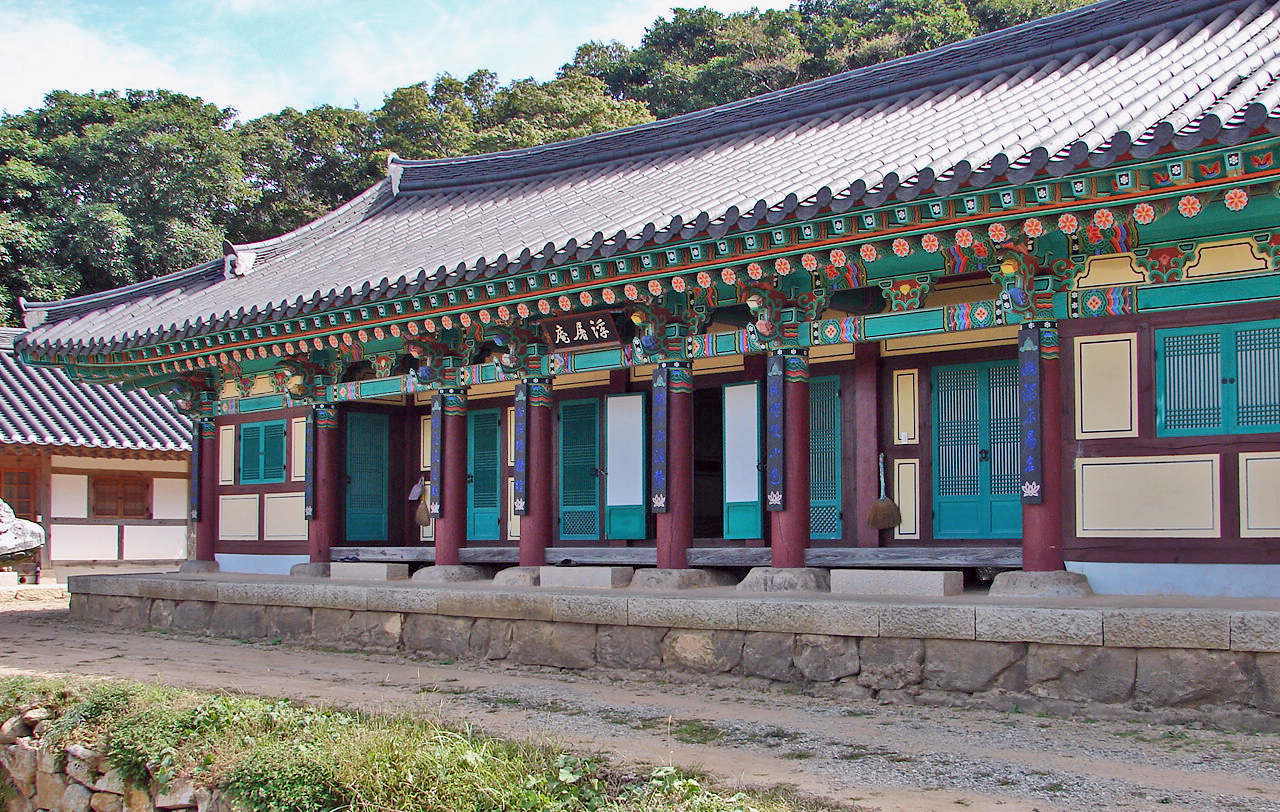

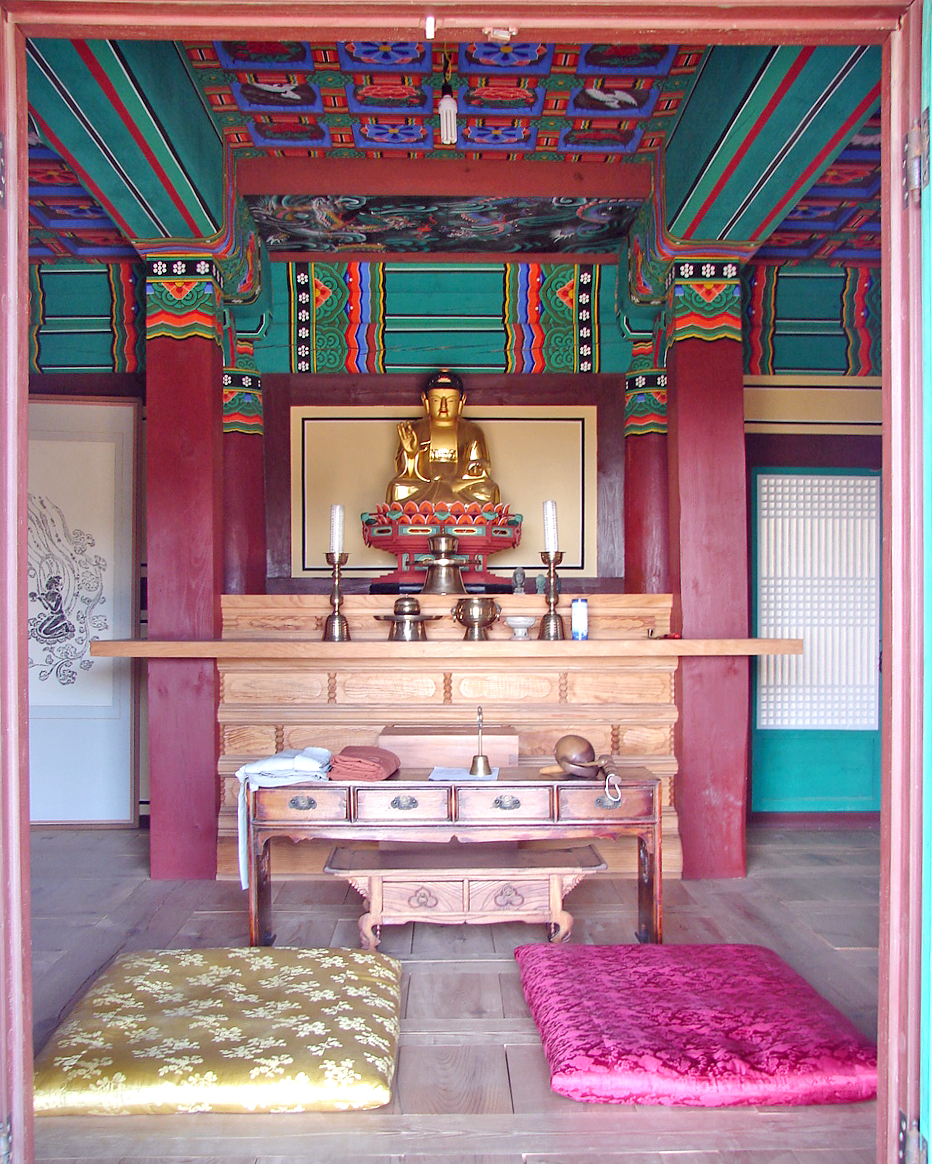

=== Tosolam ===
Tosolam is a small, single room hermitage of Mihwangsa on a peak of Dalmasan that is accessible by a hiking trail that runs along the ridge of Dalmasan.34.3670024°N 126.5724924°E

==== Tosolam Gallery ====
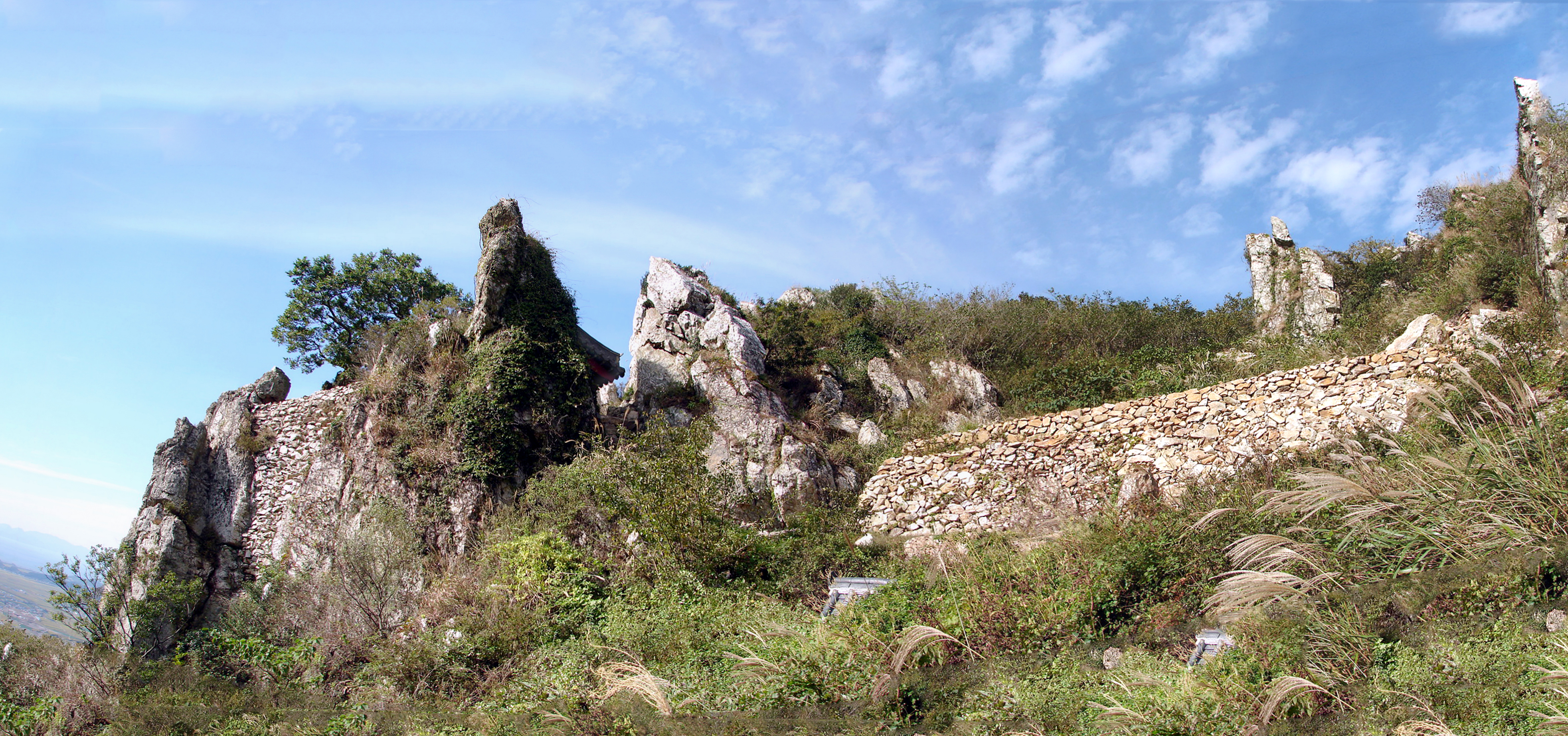

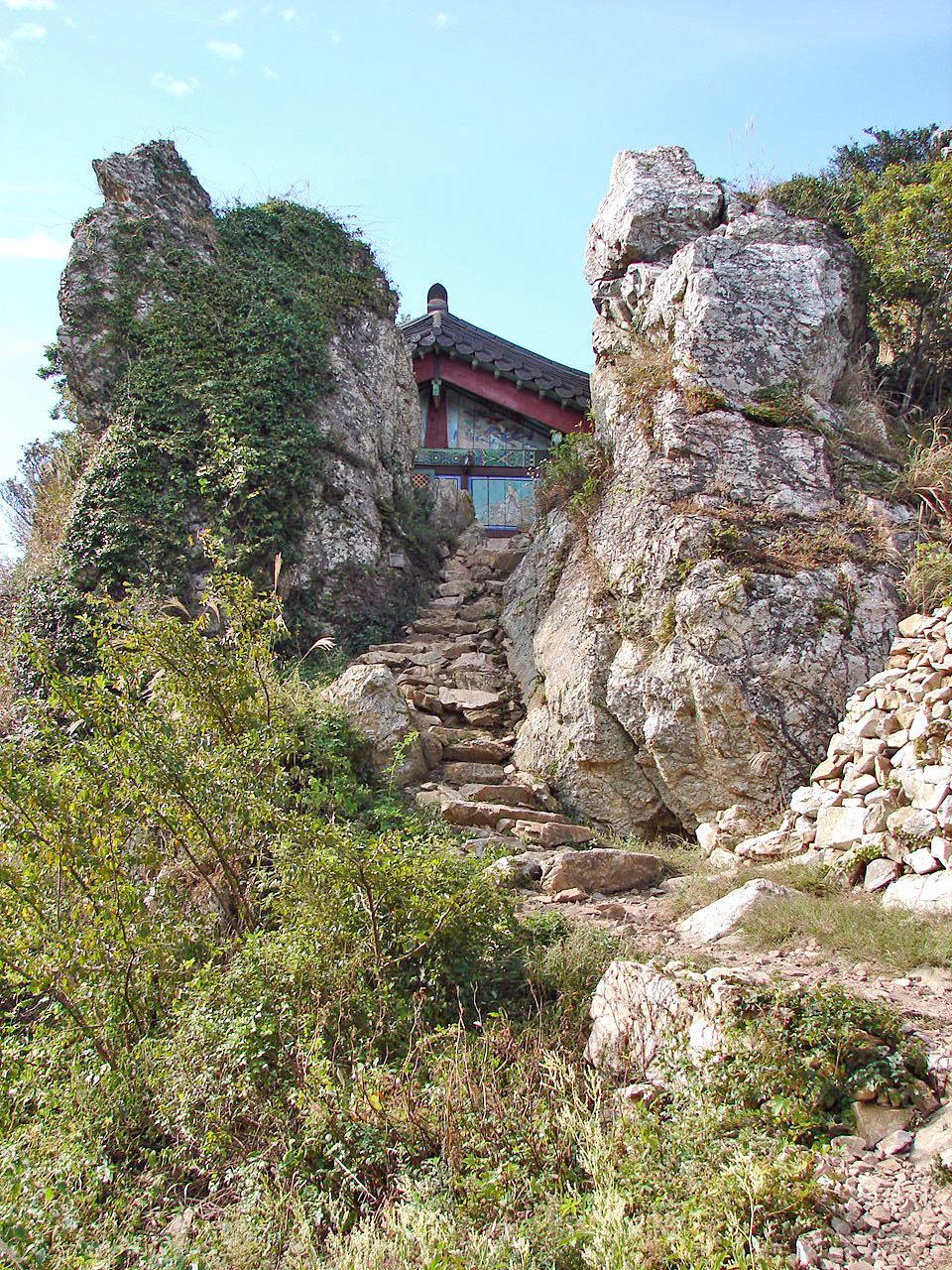

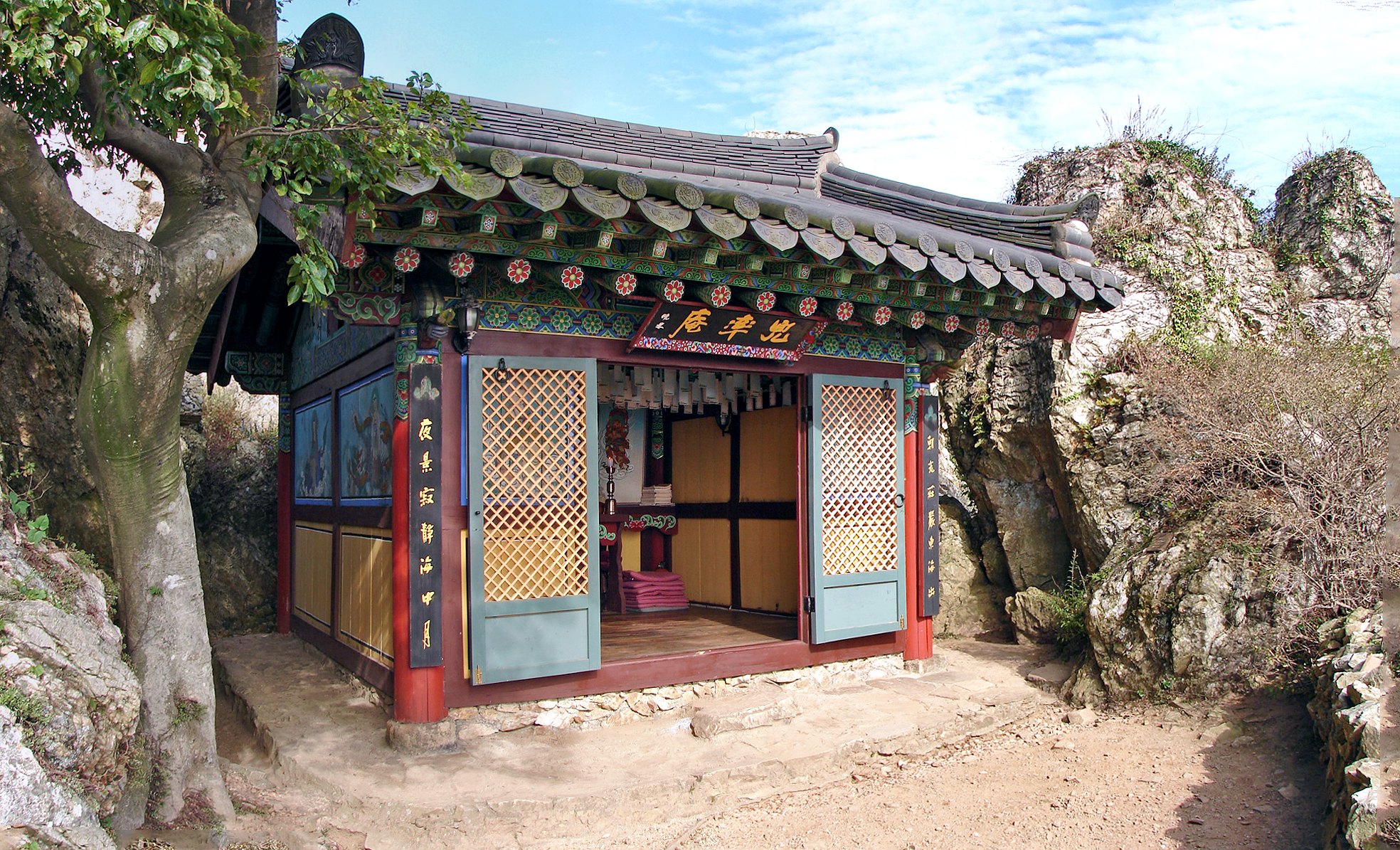

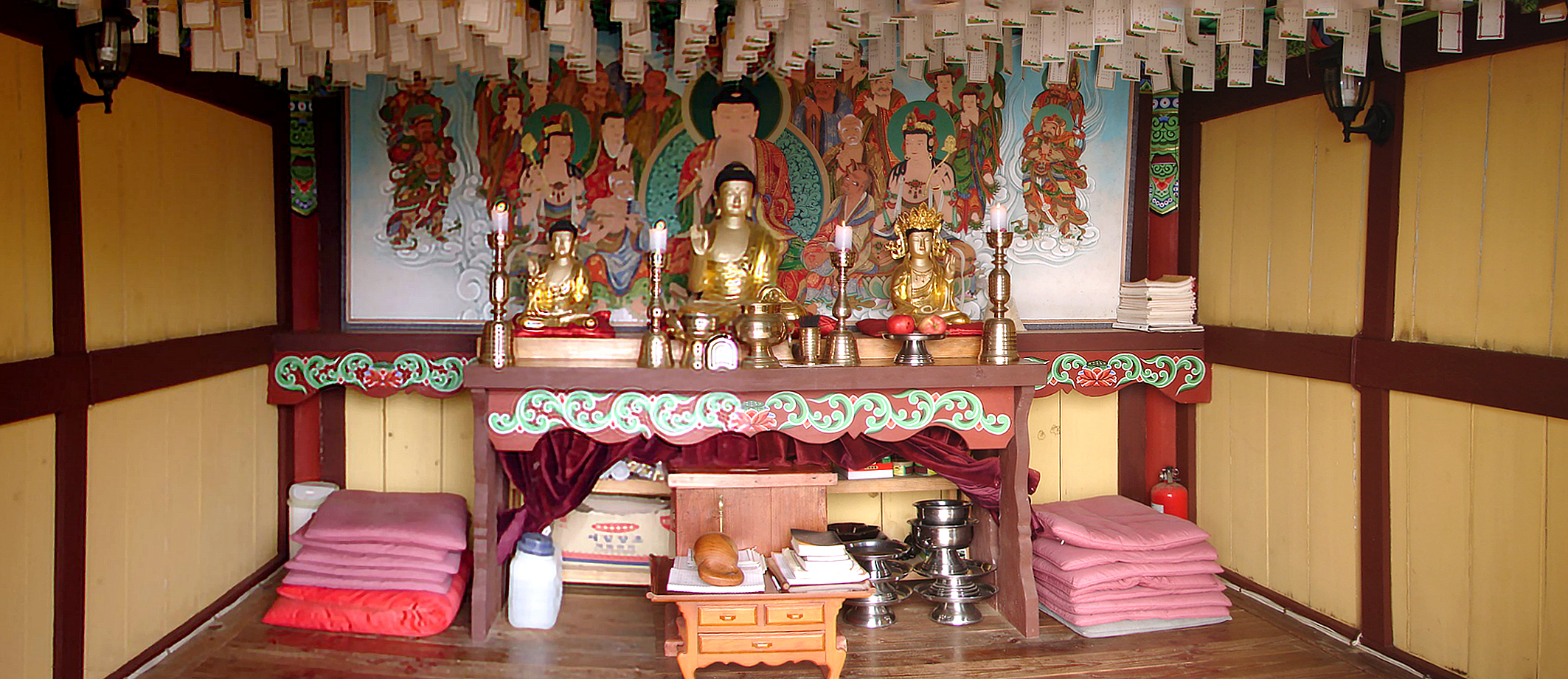
