= Dalmasan =

Mountain in South Jeolla, South Korea

Coordinates: 34°23′N 126°35′E

- Hangul: 달마산
- Hanja: 達摩山
- RR: Dalmasan
- MR: Talmasan

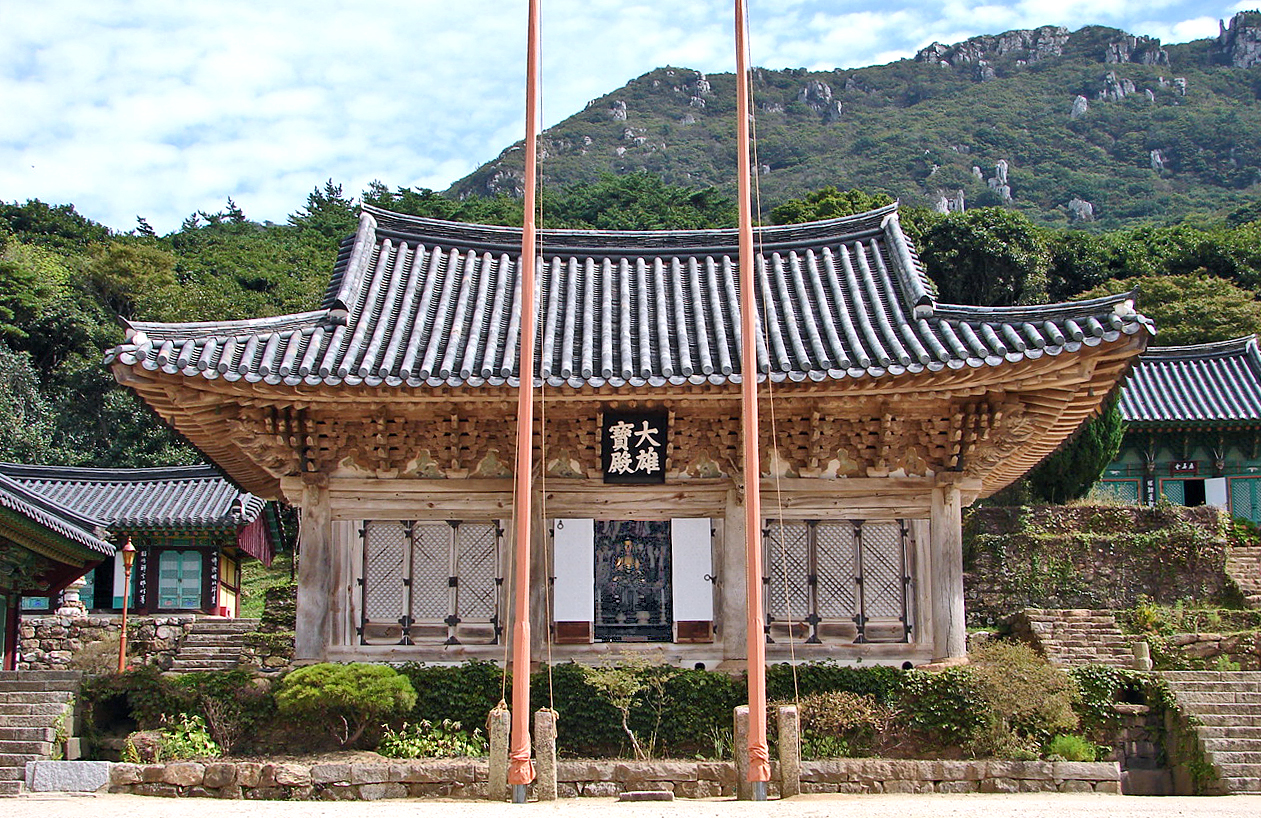
Mihwangsa temple on Dalmasan

Dalmasan (Korean: 달마산), also called Mount Dalma, is part of the Taebaek mountain range and lies in Haenam County, South Jeolla Province, South Korea. Its elevation is 489 meters, and its peak offers views of the "Land's Edge" (땅끝), the southernmost point on the Korean peninsula, 땅끝마을, and outlying islands such as Wando. Also in the vicinity are Mihwangsa and a number of hermitages affiliated with it.

There are many temples although the scale are not that huge. Mihwang temple is one of the best sights which tourists visit. It also has temple stay program for foreigners and Koreans.

== See also ==
- List of mountains in Korea
