= 2021 in South Korean television =

This is a non-comprehensive list of Television in South Korea related events from 2021.

== Channels ==
Launches:

- March 1 - YTN2
- April 1 -
  - KBS STORY
  - TVCHOSUN3
- April 8 - Channel S
- September 1 - tvN Show

== Ongoing ==
=== Animation ===
Title	Channel/Platform	First Aired	Source
The Haunted House	Tooniverse	July 20, 2016	

== New Series & Returning Shows ==
=== Animation ===
Title	Channel/Platform	First Aired	Finale	Status	Source
The Haunted House: Ghost Ball Z: Dark Exorcist	Tooniverse	September 16	December 16	Ended	

=== Drama ===
Title	Channel/Platform	First Aired	Finale	Status	Source
Crazy Recipe Adventure	MBC	January 15	June 4	Ended	
Beyond Evil	JTBC	February 19	April 10	Ended	
Be My Dream Family	KBS1	March 29	October 1	Ended	
Amor Fati	SBS TV	April 12	October 1	Ended	
Bossam: Steal the Fate	MBN	May 1	July 4	Ended	
At a Distance, Spring Is Green	KBS2	June 14	July 20, 2021	Ended	
Beasts of Asia	Educational Broadcasting System	June 20	October 19, 2021	Ended	
D.P.	Netflix	August 27	August 27, 2021	Ended	
Squid Game	Netflix	September 17	June 27, 2025	Ended	
The All-Round Wife	KBS1	October 4	April 8	Ended	
Chimera	OCN	October 30	December 19	Ended	
Artificial City	JTBC	December 8	February 10	Ended	
Bad and Crazy	tvN	December 17	January 28	Ended	
Bulgasal: Immortal Souls	tvN	December 18	February 6	Ended	

== Ending ==
=== Animation ===
End date	Title	Channel/Platform	First Aired	Source
January 21	The Haunted House: Ghost Ball Double X Suspicious Request	Tooniverse	October 8, 2020	
December 6	The Haunted House: Ghost Ball Z: Dark Exorcist	Tooniverse	September 16, 2021	

=== Drama ===
End date	Title	Channel/Platform	First Aired	Source
June 4	Crazy Recipe Adventure	MBC	January 15	
October 1	Be My Dream Family	KBS1	March 29	
October 1	Amor Fati	SBS TV	April 12, 2021	
