= The Haunted House (TV series) =

South Korean animated television series

- Genre: Adventure; Fantasy; Horror
- Directed by: Lee Jong-hyuk
- Voices of: Jo Hyeon-jeong; Kim Young-eun; Kim Chae-ha; Shin Yong-woo; Yeo Min-jeong
- Country of origin: South Korea
- Original language: Korean
- No. of seasons: 5
- No. of episodes: 123 (list of episodes)

Production
- Running time: 22-24 minutes
- Production companies: Studio BAZOOKA; Studio EEK

Original release
- Network: Tooniverse
- Release: July 20, 2016 – present

The Haunted House, also known as Shinbi Apartment (Korean: 신비아파트), is a South Korean animated television series created by Seok Jong-seo. It premiered on Tooniverse on July 20, 2016. The series focuses on Shinbi and his friends in their endeavor to stop ghosts from attacking people and effort to save the world.

== Series overview ==
Season	Episodes		Originally released	
Season	Episodes		First released	Last released
Pilots	4		December 31, 2014	
1	24		July 20, 2016	January 18, 2017
2	23	13	November 9, 2017	March 15, 2018
2	23	10	November 8, 2018	January 24, 2019
3	26	13	March 5, 2020	June 4, 2020
3	26	13	October 8, 2020	January 21, 2021
4	24	12	September 16, 2021	December 16, 2021
4	24	12	April 28, 2022	July 28, 2022
5	26	11	March 30, 2023	June 15, 2023
5	26	15	November 30, 2023	March 14, 2024

== Characters and casts ==
- Hari Koo (구하리; Korean: Kim Young-eun, English: Natasha Strickey)
- Doori Koo (구두리; Korean: Kim Chae-ha, English: Conrad Dickinson)
- Shinbi (신비; Korean: Jo Hyeon-jeong, English: Anna Cummer)
- Kang-lim Choi (최강림; Korean: Shin Yong-woo, English: Bill Rawts)
- Gaeun Lee (이가은; Korean: Yeo Min-jeong, English: Caitlynne Medrek)
- Hyun-woo Kim (김현우; Korean: Shim Kyu-hyuk, English: Alex Bergen)
- Ian (이안; Korean: Choi Seung-hoon, English: Brett Bauer)
- Leon Raymond/Cain (리온 레이몬드/카인; Korean: Myung-jun Kim)
- Geumbi (금비; Korean: Yang Jeong-hwa)
- Sara (사라; Korean: Park Shi-yoon)
- Jubi (주비; Korean: Kim Hyeon-ji)
- Guido Hyun (현; Korean: Kim Jang)
- Chungha Kim (김청하; Korean: Chae Rim)
- Heewon (희원; Korean: Kim Haru)
- Jihoon (지훈; Korean: Kang Seong-woo)
- Jimi Yoo (유지미; Korean: Lee So-eun, English: Megan Baldrey)
- Innam Koo (Rico Koo in the English version) (구인남; Korean: Choi Jae-ho, English: Ryan Simmons)
- Ryu (류; Korean: Bak Seon-yeong, English: Cheryl McMaster)
- Ancieto (아니체토; Korean: Kwon Hyuk-soo)
- Cerberos (케르베로스; Korean: Seon Soo-ho)

== Franchises ==
=== Films ===
The first film, titled The Haunted House: The Secret of the Cave, was directed by Kim Byung-gab and was released on July 25, 2018.

The second film, titled The Haunted House: The Sky Goblin VS Jormungandr, was directed by Byeon Young-Kyu and was released on December 19, 2019.

Byeon Young-Kyu returned as the director for the third film, titled The Haunted House: The Dimensional Goblin and the Seven Worlds. The film was released on December 14, 2022.

The fourth film was a compilation of episodes from the fifth season as a special film, titled The Haunted House Special: Red Eyed Reaper. It was directed by Park Hong-geun and released on August 14, 2024, exclusively on CGV.

=== Specials ===
The series became available to stream on TVING in 2021 and included a special episode, titled The Haunted House Special: The Vampire of Light and the Child of Darkness, released on December 22, 2021.

The second special episode, titled The Haunted House Special: Joseon Exorcism Annals, was released on July 14, 2023, and aired until July 21, 2023, with a total of 4 two-part episodes.

the third special episode, Named The Haunted House Special: Red Eyed Reaper, Released on August 14, 2024

=== Live-action ===
A live-action show based on the series, titled Remember, Hari, premiered on Tooniverse on August 2, 2018. The first season ran until September 7, 2018, and included 12 episodes. The second season aired from February 15 to April 5, 2019, in 8 episodes.

The second series, titled Hearts and Hari, aired from January 17 to March 21, 2020, with 12 episodes.

=== Video games ===
The mobile simulation game, titled Ghost Signal (고스트 시그널), was released on December 12, 2019, on Android and January 9, 2020, on iOS, published by RHAON.

The mobile RPG video game of The Haunted House: Soul Fighters (신비아파트: 소울파이터즈) was released on April 7, 2020, on Android, published by Move Interactive.

The mobile video game Archer Kang-lim (궁수강림: 6개의 예언) was released on May 5, 2020, on Android and iOS. and Time Zero (타임제로) was released on March 25, 2023, on Android and iOS, both published by 3F Factory.

=== Webtoon ===
The webtoon manhwa series was released on January 29, 2026 on Naver Webtoon.
