= List of TVING original programming =

South Korean streaming media service TVING began to produce its own original content since 2021 and the list of them is as follows:

== Original programming ==
=== Drama ===
==== TV series ====
List of TV series, showing the genre, premiere and finale dates, and runtime
Title	Original Title	Genre	Premiere	Finale	Seasons	Runtime	Ref.
Scripting Your Destiny	당신의 운명을 쓰고 있습니다	Romantic fantasy	March 26, 2021		1 season, 10 episodes	21–32 min	
The Witch's Diner	마녀식당으로 오세요	Fantasy	July 16, 2021	August 13, 2021	1 season, 8 episodes	48–57 min	
I'm Watching You	지켜보고 있다	Crime	August 26, 2021	October 28, 2021	1 season, 4 episodes	37–63 min	
Yumi's Cells	유미의 세포들	Psychological romance	September 17, 2021	July 22, 2022	2 seasons, 28 episodes	59–70 min	
Work Later, Drink Now	술꾼도시여자들	Slice of life comedy	October 22, 2021	January 13, 2023	2 seasons, 24 episodes	21–46 min	
Happiness	해피니스	Horror action thriller	November 5, 2021	December 11, 2021	1 season, 12 episodes	61–73 min	
Adult Trainee	어른연습생	Teen comedy	November 12, 2021	November 26, 2021	1 season, 7 episodes	40 min	
Dr. Park's Clinic	내과 박원장	Medical comedy	January 14, 2022	February 18, 2022	1 season, 12 episodes	27–40 min	
I Have Not Done My Best	아직 최선을 다하지 않았을 뿐	Comedy	February 18, 2022	March 25, 2022	1 season, 12 episodes	61–67 min	
The King of Pigs	돼지의 왕	Crime thriller	March 18, 2022	April 22, 2022	1 season, 12 episodes	44–65 min	
Monstrous	괴이	Supernatural thriller	April 29, 2022		1 season, 6 episodes	33–39 min	
Rose Mansion	장미맨션	Crime thriller	May 13, 2022	May 27, 2022	1 season, 12 episodes	34–54 min	
Dear X Who Doesn't Love Me	나를 사랑하지 않는 X에게	Romantic	July 14, 2022	July 28, 2022	1 season, 10 episodes	20–40 min	
Stock Struck	개미가 타고 있어요	Comedy drama	August 12, 2022	September 16, 2022	1 season, 12 episodes	38–47 min	
Yonder (Note: Commissioned with Paramount+.)	욘더	Science fiction	October 14, 2022	October 22, 2022	1 season, 6 episodes	30–36 min	
Bargain	몸값	Survival thriller	October 28, 2022	November 4, 2022	1 season, 6 episodes	33–37 min	
Island	아일랜드	Dark fantasy action thriller	December 30, 2022	March 10, 2023	1 season, 12 episodes	43–58 min	
Unintentional Love Story (Note: These shows were available at a time as TVING originals, but have been since removed from the service.)	비의도적 연애담	BL romantic comedy	March 17, 2023	April 14, 2023	1 season, 10 episodes	33–44 min	
Duty After School	방과 후 전쟁활동	Military sci-fi action thriller	March 31, 2023	April 21, 2023	1 season, 10 episodes	55–92 min	
All That We Loved	우리가 사랑했던 모든것	Teen romance	May 5, 2023	May 26, 2023	1 season, 8 episodes	24–42 min	
Cold Blooded Intern	잔혹한	Workplace comedy slice of life	August 11, 2023	September 15, 2023	1 season, 12 episodes	35–48 min	
CEO-dol Mart	사장돌마트	Teen comedy	September 15, 2023	October 13, 2023	1 season, 10 episodes	46–66 min	
A Bloody Lucky Day	운수 오진 날	Psychological thriller	November 24, 2023	December 8, 2023	1 season, 10 episodes	46–65 min	
Death's Game	이재, 곧 죽습니다	Fantasy reincarnation	December 15, 2023	January 5, 2024	1 season, 8 episodes	38–64 min	
LTNS	엘티엔에스	Black comedy satirical drama	January 19, 2024	February 1, 2024	1 season, 6 episodes	53–63 min	
Pyramid Game	피라미드 게임	Psychological thriller	February 29, 2024	March 21, 2024	1 season, 10 episodes	49–64 min	
Dreaming of a Freaking Fairy Tale	나는 대놓고 신데렐라를 꿈꾼다	Romantic comedy	May 31, 2024	June 28, 2024	1 season, 10 episodes	43–45 min	
Queen Woo	우씨왕후	Sageuk action	August 29, 2024	September 12, 2024	1 season, 8 episodes	55–61 min	
Spice Up Our Love	사장님의 식단표	Romantic fantasy	October 3, 2024		1 season, 2 episodes	47–52 min	
Dongjae, the Good or the Bastard	좋거나 나쁜 동재	Crime thriller legal drama	October 10, 2024	November 7, 2024	1 season, 10 episodes	42–56 min	
The Queen Who Crowns	원경	Period drama melodrama	January 6, 2025	February 11, 2025	1 season, 12 episodes	57–60 min	
Study Group	스터디그룹	Action comedy teen drama	January 23, 2025	February 20, 2025	1 season, 10 episodes	42–43 min	
The Scandal of Chunhwa	춘화연애담	Historical romance	February 6, 2025	March 6, 2025	1 season, 10 episodes	61–75 min	
Way Back Love	내가 죽기 일주일 전	Coming-of-age romantic fantasy	April 3, 2025	April 17, 2025	1 season, 6 episodes	45–51 min	
Shark: The Storm	샤크: 더 스톰	Action thriller	May 15, 2025		1 season, 6 episodes	23–28 min	
I Am a Running Mate	러닝메이트	School drama coming-of-age	June 19, 2025		1 season, 9 episodes	42–48 min	
Spirit Fingers	스피릿 핑거스	Coming-of-age romance	October 29, 2025	November 26, 2025	1 season, 12 episodes	52–61 min	
Dear X	친애하는 X	Melodrama thriller	November 6, 2025		1 season, 12 episodes	62–70 min	
Villains	빌런즈	Crime thriller	December 18, 2025	January 8, 2026	1 season, 16 episodes	35–53 min	
The Legend of Kitchen Soldier	취사병 전설이 되다	Military comedy fantasy	May 11, 2026	June 16, 2026	1 season, 12 episodes	55-60 min	
The Ordinary Jackpot	로또 1등도 출근합니다	Workplace drama	September 10, 2026	October 8, 2026	1 season, 10 episodes	44–53 min	
Make Me Tingle	내가 떨릴 수 있게	Romantic comedy	October 15, 2026	November 5, 2026	1 season, 10 episodes	50–59 min	
One-of-a-Kind Romance	유일무이 로맨스	Romantic comedy	November 9, 2026	December 14, 2026	1 season, 12 episodes	TBA	
Awaiting release
The Substitute	대리수능	School drama crime thriller	November 23, 2026	TBA	TBA	TBA	

==== Specials ====
List of specials, showing the genre, release date, and runtime
Title	Original Title	Genre	Release date	Runtime	Ref.
Mouse: The Predator (Note: Mouse spin-off.)	마우스: 더 프레데터	Crime thriller mystery	April 28, 2021	60 min	

=== Entertainment ===
List of entertainment shows, showing the genre, premiere date, finale date, and runtime
Title	Original Title	Genre	Premiere	Finale	Seasons	Runtime	Ref.
High School Mystery Club	여고추리반	Mystery	January 29, 2021	February 18, 2022	Unknown	31–51 min	
The Four Seasons of Baek Jong-won	백종원의 사계	Cooking	April 2, 2021	May 21, 2021	1 season, 8 episodes	Unknown	
Famous Singer: Hidden Track	유명가수전 히든트랙	Music/variety	April 9, 2021	June 25, 2021	Unknown	Unknown	
Spring Camp (Note: New Journey to the West spin-off.)	스프링 캠프	Travel docu-reality	May 7, 2021	July 2, 2021	Unknown	Unknown	
Idol Song Dictation Contest (Note: DoReMi Market spin-off.)	아이돌 받아쓰기 대회	Music game show	May 21, 2021	June 11, 2021	Unknown	Unknown	
Exchange	환승연애	Dating/reality show	June 25, 2021	October 1, 2021	3 seasons, 35 episodes	Unknown	
Here Come the Gold Gods	골신강림	Sports reality	August 26, 2021	November 11, 2021	1 season, 12 episodes	Unknown	
Love Catcher in Seoul	러브캐처 인 서울	Dating reality competition	November 18, 2021	January 6, 2022	1 season, 8 episodes	50 min	
Seoul Check-in	서울체크인	Unknown	April 8, 2022 (Note: The series is also released as the Pilot in January 29, 2022.)	July 1, 2022	1 season, 11 episodes	Unknown	
Zero-sum Game	제로섬게임	Variety show	July 1, 2022	August 26, 2022	1 season, 12 episodes	40–45 min	
Young Actors' Retreat	청춘MT	Travel show	September 9, 2022	October 21, 2022	1 season, 6 episodes	54–68 min	
Food Chronicle	푸드 크로니클	Culinary docuseries	October 20, 2022	December 15, 2022	Unknown	Unknown	
Treasure Hunt	보물찾기	Survival reality	December 2, 2022	January 20, 2023	1 season, 8 episodes	85 mins	
Ticketing on Two Feet	두 발로 티켓팅	Travel docu-reality	January 20, 2023	March 3, 2023	1 season, 8 episodes	59–82 min	
Cartoon Rip	만찢남	Survival reality	January 27, 2023	March 10, 2023	Unknown	Unknown	
Webtoon Singer	웹툰싱어	Music	February 17, 2023	April 7, 2023	1 season, 8 episodes	Unknown	
The Time Hotel	더 타임 호텔	Survival reality	April 12, 2023	May 17, 2023	1 season, 10 episodes	Unknown	
MBTI vs Saju	MBTI vs 사주	Unknown	April 13, 2023	Unknown	Unknown	Unknown	
The Dessert	더 디저트	Unknown	April 26, 2023	Unknown	Unknown	Unknown	
Playou Level Up: Villain's World	플레이유 레벨업	Unknown	May 24, 2023	Unknown	Unknown	Unknown	
Blossom with Love	소년소녀연애하다	Dating/reality show	October 5, 2023	Unknown	Unknown	Unknown	
Rap:Public	랩:퍼블릭	Music survival reality competition	October 2, 2024	December 11, 2024	1 season, 12 episodes	78–158 min	

=== Docuseries ===
List of documentary shows, showing the genre, premiere date, finale date, and runtime
Title	Original Title	Genre	Premiere	Finale	Seasons	Runtime	Ref.
K-pop Generation	케이팝 제너레이션	Music	January 26, 2023	April 6, 2023	1 season, 8 episodes	Unknown	
Our Game: LG Twins	아워게임 : LG트윈스	Sports docuseries	March 30, 2023	April 20, 2023	1 season, 8 episodes	Unknown	

=== Animation ===
List of animation, showing the genre, release date, and runtime
Title	Original Title	Genre	Premiere	Finale	Seasons	Runtime	Ref.
Terror Man	테러맨	Action adventure science fiction psychological drama	January 29, 2026		1 season, 8 episodes	23–29 min	

==== Specials ====
List of animated specials, showing the genre, release date, and runtime
Title	Original Title	Genre	Premiere	Finale	Seasons	Runtime	Ref.
The Haunted House Special: The Vampire of Light and the Child of Darkness	신비아파트 특별판: 빛의 뱀파이어와 어둠의 아이	Fantasy horror/Family	December 22, 2021		1 season, 1 episode	55 min	
The Haunted House Special: Joseon Exorcism Annals	신비아파트 특별판: 조선퇴마실록	Fantasy horror/Family	July 14, 2023	July 21, 2023	1 season, 4 episodes	Unknown	

== Original films ==
=== Feature films ===
List of films, showing the genre, release date, and runtime
Title	Original Title	Genre	Release date	Runtime	Ref.
Seo Bok	서복	Sci-fi action	April 15, 2021	1 hour, 54 min	
Shark: The Beginning	샤크: 더 비기닝	Action	June 17, 2021	1 hour, 48 min	
Midnight	미드나이트	Thriller	June 30, 2021	1 hour, 43 min	
A Year-End Medley	해피 뉴 이어	Romantic comedy	December 29, 2021	2 hour, 18 min	

== Upcoming original programming ==
=== Drama ===
==== TV series ====
List of upcoming TV series, showing the genre, premiere date, and runtime
Title	Original Title	Genre	Premiere	Seasons	Runtime	Ref.
Love Virus	러브 바이러스	Romantic comedy	TBA	TBA	TBA	
M: Reboot	M: 리부트	Horror thriller	TBA	TBA	TBA	
Palace Land	궁전랜드	Coming-of-age sitcom	TBA	TBA	TBA	

=== Animation ===
==== TV series ====
List of animated series, showing the genre, premiere date, and runtime
Title	Original Title	Genre	Premiere	Seasons	Runtime	Ref.
Tale of the Nine Tailed Tiger: The Beginning of a Lotus	구미호뎐: 연의 시작	Unknown	Unknown	Unknown	Unknown	
Nano List	나노리스트	Unknown	Unknown	Unknown	Unknown	

== Exclusive international distribution programming ==
=== TV series ===
List of TV series, showing the genre, original networks, countries, premiere date, and original run
Title	Genre	Original network	Country	Premiere	Seasons	Original run	Ref.
Nymphs	Fantasy Drama	MTV3, AVA	Finland	November 23, 2021	12 episodes	2014	
Dexter: New Blood	Crime drama, Mystery	Showtime (Note: Later featured on Paramount+ block)	United States	December 30, 2021	season 1, 8 episodes	2021–22	

=== Film ===
List of films, showing the genre, release date, runtime, and languages
Title	Genre	Release date	Runtime	Language	Ref.
Bronson	Prison action thriller	July 29, 2021	1 hour, 32 min	English	
