= List of The Haunted House episodes =

Key visual of the series.

The Haunted House, also known as Shinbi Apartment (신비아파트), is a South Korean animated television series created by Seok Jong-seo that premiered on Tooniverse on July 20, 2016. The series focuses on Shinbi, a small oni-like goblin and his friends stopping ghosts from attacking other people and saving the world.

The first season titled The Haunted House: The Secret of the Ghost Ball, aired from July 20, 2016, to January 18, 2017, every Wednesday.

The first part of the second season titled The Haunted House: Birth of Ghost Ball X, aired from November 9, 2017, through March 15, 2018. The second part titled The Second Story aired on November 8, 2018, to January 24, 2019.

The first part of the third season titled The Haunted House: Ghost Ball Double X: The 6 Prophecies aired from March 5 to June 4, 2020. The second part titled Suspicious Request aired from October 8, 2020 to January 21, 2021. The 24th episode was replaced by the Christmas special episode of The Haunted House Christmas Special: Grandma's Wish, Wheat Donggwi from North Korea, which premiered on December 24, 2020.

The first part of the fourth season titled The Haunted House: Ghost Ball Z: The Dark Exorcist aired from September 16 to December 16, 2021. The second part titled Guido Exorcist aired from April 28 to July 28, 2022.

The series was featured as a special episode of The Haunted House Special: The Vampire of Light and the Child of Darkness premiered on streaming service TVING on December 22, 2021, with 55 minutes total. The Haunted House Special: Joseon Exorcism Annals was released on TVING on July 14 to 21, 2023, with 4 episodes in half.

The fifth season was announced before showing after credits in the third film, The Haunted House: The Dimensional Goblin and the Seven Worlds, which was released on December 14, 2022. The first part titled The Haunted House: Ghost Ball ZERO aired from March 30 through June 15, 2023. The second part, titled The Second Story, aired from November 30, 2023 to March 14, 2024.

== Series overview ==
Season	Episodes		Originally released	
Season	Episodes		First released	Last released
Pilots	4		December 31, 2014	
1	24		July 20, 2016	January 18, 2017
2	23	13	November 9, 2017	March 15, 2018
2	23	10	November 8, 2018	January 24, 2019
3	26	13	March 5, 2020	June 4, 2020
3	26	13	October 8, 2020	January 21, 2021
4	24	12	September 16, 2021	December 16, 2021
4	24	12	April 28, 2022	July 28, 2022
5	26	11	March 30, 2023	June 15, 2023
5	26	15	November 30, 2023	March 14, 2024

== Episodes ==
=== Pilots: Room 444 (2014) ===
No.	Title	Original release date
1	"Welcome to Shinbi Apartment... Elevator ghost!" Transliteration: "Eoseowa sinbi apateue… ellibeiteo gwisin!" (Korean: 어서와 신비 아파트에… 엘리베이터 귀신!)	December 31, 2014
2	"Thump, thump, thump. A ghost of noise between floors in the middle of the night!" Transliteration: "Kung.kung.kung. Hanbam-ui cheung-gan so-eum gwisin!" (Korean: 쿵.쿵.쿵. 한밤의 층간 소음 귀신!)	December 31, 2014
3	"Shhh, don't make a sound… Ghost playing tag!" Transliteration: "Swis, soli naejima… Sullaejabgi gwisin!" (Korean: 쉿, 소리 내지마… 술래잡기 귀신!)	December 31, 2014
4	"Yellow eyes in a maze! Basement ghost!" Transliteration: "Milo sog-ui nolan nundongja! Jihasil gwisin!" (Korean: 미로 속의 노란 눈동자! 지하실 귀신!)	December 31, 2014

=== Season 1: The Secret of the Ghost Ball (2016–17) ===
No. overall	No. in season	Title (Note: English translated titles are taken from Netflix.)	Original release date
1	1	"The Dreadful Descent of the Drowned Ghost!"; Transliteration: "Dol-aon sinbiapateu! Geom-eun mul sog-ui gongpo!" (Korean: 돌아온 신비아파트! 검은 물 속의 공포!)	July 20, 2016
2	2	"The Unbreakable Curse of the Girl's Hair!"; Transliteration: "Beos-eonal su eobsneun jeoju... sonyeoui meolikalag" (Korean: 벗어날 수 없는 저주... 소녀의 머리카락)	July 27, 2016
3	3	"The Terrifying Temptation of the Shadow Ghost"; Transliteration: "Yeppeojigo sipni? Geulimja gwisin-ui yuhog" (Korean: 예뻐지고 싶니? 그림자 귀신의 유혹)	August 3, 2016
4	4	"The Sinister Strike of the Spider Ghost!"; Transliteration: "Changbakk-ui bulgilhan siseon! Geomi gwisin-ui seubgyeog" (Korean: 창밖의 불길한 시선! 거미 귀신의 습격)	August 10, 2016
5	5	"The Enticing Entrapment of Ethra"; Transliteration: "Jeojubad-eun seumateupon" (Korean: 저주받은 스마트폰)	August 17, 2016
6	6	"The Nightmare of the No-Face Ghost"; Transliteration: "Jeongcheleul al su eobsneun jeog, eolgul eobsneun gwisin" (Korean: 정체를 알 수 없는 적, 얼굴 없는 귀신)	August 24, 2016
7	7	"The Mystery of the Marionette Queen"; Transliteration: "Bulgilhan mellodiui jeoju, ballelinaui oleugol" (Korean: 불길한 멜로디의 저주, 발레리나의 오르골)	August 31, 2016
8	8	"The Bewitched Bus!"; Transliteration: "Gongpoui 4444beon beoseu" (Korean: 공포의 4444번 버스)	September 7, 2016
9	9	"The Weird Tale of the Wicked Doll Ghost!"; Transliteration: "Ppajyeonagal su eobsneun hamjeong.. inganppobgi gigye" (Korean: 빠져나갈 수 없는 함정.. 인간뽑기 기계)	September 21, 2016
10	10	"Ian the Red-Eyed Boy"; Transliteration: "Bulg-eun nundongjaui sonyeon, ian" (Korean: 붉은 눈동자의 소년, 이안)	September 28, 2016
11	11	"The Mystifying and Malevolent Maze!"; Transliteration: "4wa 2bun-ui1, gwisin jido" (Korean: 4와 2분의1, 귀신 지도)	October 12, 2016
12	12	"The Hair-Raising Tale of the Homunculus!"; Transliteration: "Jag-eun ingan, homunkulluseu" (Korean: 작은 인간, 호문쿨루스)	October 19, 2016
13	13	"The Frightening Fable of the Flower of Death!"; Transliteration: "Jug-eum-eseo dol-aon kkoch" (Korean: 죽음에서 돌아온 꽃)	October 26, 2016
14	14	"The Spine-Chilling Story of the Skeleton Ghost!"; Transliteration: "Gongpoui sulyeonhoe, mudeom sog-ui aglyeong" (Korean: 공포의 수련회, 무덤 속의 악령)	November 2, 2016
15	15	"Invasion of the Iron Beast"; Transliteration: "Gangcheol jimseung-ui seubgyeog" (Korean: 강철 짐승의 습격)	November 9, 2016
16	16	"The Horrifying Game of Hide and Seek"; Transliteration: "Kkogkkog sum-eola, meolikalag boilla! Gwisingwaui sumbakkogjil!" (Korean: 꼭꼭 숨어라, 머리카락 보일라! 귀신과의 숨바꼭질!)	November 16, 2016
17	17	"The Malediction Malfunction"; Transliteration: "Geulim, lobos, geuligo puleunjeojuui yeonghon" (Korean: 그림, 로봇, 그리고 푸른저주의 영혼)	November 23, 2016
18	18	"The Spectral Sentinel"; Transliteration: "Eommaui wigi, kkeutnaji anhneun agmong!" (Korean: 엄마의 위기, 끝나지 않는 악몽!)	November 30, 2016
19	19	"The Vampire King"; Transliteration: "Baempaieoui wang" (Korean: 뱀파이어의 왕)	December 7, 2016
20	20	"Storm of the Straw Ghost"; Transliteration: "Bioneun nal-ui bangmunja, seom-eseo on gwisin" (Korean: 비오는 날의 방문자, 섬에서 온 귀신)	December 14, 2016
21	21	"A Dangerous Invite The Secret of the Wooden Mansion"; Transliteration: "Jihagugdaejeog-ui deungjang!" (Korean: 지하국대적의 등장!)	December 21, 2016
22	22	"The Rise of the Underground Nation"; Transliteration: "Angaesog-ui eummo, hayan nalgaeui goesu!" (Korean: 안개속의 음모, 하얀 날개의 괴수!)	January 4, 2017
23	23	"Shinbi Apartment – Doomsday (Part One)"; Transliteration: "Sinbiapateu, choehuui wigi (sang)" (Korean: 신비아파트, 최후의 위기 (상))	January 11, 2017
24	24	"Shinbi Apartment – Doomsday (Part Two)"; Transliteration: "Sinbiapateu, choehuui wigi (ha)" (Korean: 신비아파트, 최후의 위기 (하))	January 18, 2017

=== Season 2: Birth of Ghost Ball X (2017–19) ===
No. overall	No. in season	Title (Note: English translated titles are taken from Netflix.)	Original release date	Viewership rating
Part 1
25	1	"The New Threat of The Haunted House! Gaze Through the Open Door"; Transliteration: "Yeeon-ui sijag, geom-eun sasin-ui molaebalam" (Korean: 신비아파트, 새로운 위기 문틈속의 시선)	November 9, 2017	N/A
26	2	"Listen to My Song The Cursed Voice"; Transliteration: "Nae nolaeleul deul-eojwo, Jeojuui mogsoli" (Korean: "내 노래를 들어줘." 저주의 목소리)	November 16, 2017	N/A
27	3	"An Unkept Promise The Attack of the Living Doll"; Transliteration: "Jikiji moshan yagsog, sal-aissneun inhyeong-ui seubgyeog" (Korean: 지키지 못한 약속, 살아있는 인형의 습격)	November 23, 2017	N/A
28	4	"The Cursed Hospital The Nurse with Red Tears"; Transliteration: "Jeojue geollin byeong-won, bulg-eun nunmul-ui ganhosa" (Korean: 저주에 걸린 병원, 붉은 눈물의 간호사)	November 30, 2017	N/A
29	5	"Invitation to the Nightmare The Visitor in the Dream"; Transliteration: "Agmong-euloui chodae, kkumsog-ui bangmunja" (Korean: 악몽으로의 초대, 꿈속의 방문자)	January 4, 2018	N/A
30	6	"The Legendary Enemy The Shadow of the Ancient Monster"; Transliteration: "Jeonseol sog-ui jeog, godae goesuui geulimja" (Korean: 전설 속의 적, 고대 괴수의 그림자)	January 11, 2018	N/A
31	7	"I'll Find You The Game Show of Fear"; Transliteration: "Neol chaj-agalge! Gongpoui geimbangsong" (Korean: "널 찾아갈게!" 공포의 게임방송)	January 18, 2018	N/A
32	8	"Angry Ghost Trapped in a Picture The Legend of Slender Man"; Transliteration: "Sajinsog-e gadhin wonhon, seullendeomaen-ui jeonseol" (Korean: 사진속에 갇힌 원혼, 슬렌더맨의 전설)	January 25, 2018	10.0%
33	9	"Carnival of Greed Reune Apartment"; Transliteration: "Tam-yog-ui kanibal, leune apateu" (Korean: 탐욕의 카니발, 르네 아파트)	February 1, 2018	N/A
34	10	"The Cursed Night Retreat of Fear"; Transliteration: "Jeojunaelin bam, gongpoui sulyeonhoe" (Korean: 저주내린 밤, 공포의 수련회)	February 8, 2018	N/A
35	11	"Forbidden Invitation The Clown of Madness"; Transliteration: "Geumjidoen chodaejang, gwang-giui pielo" (Korean: 금지된 초대장, 광기의 피에로)	March 1, 2018	N/A
36	12	"The Demon Behind the Mask Ghost Ball in Crisis (Part 1)"; Transliteration: "Gamyeonsog-ui agma, wigiui goseuteubol (sangpyeon)" (Korean: 가면속의 악마, 위기의 고스트볼 (상편))	March 8, 2018	N/A
37	13	"The Demon Behind the Mask Ghost Ball in Crisis (Part 2)"; Transliteration: "Gamyeonsog-ui agma, wigiui goseuteubol (hapyeon)" (Korean: 가면속의 악마, 위기의 고스트볼 (하편))	March 15, 2018	N/A
Part 2
38	14	"The Ghost's Shoes and the Disappeared Children"; Transliteration: "Gwisin sinbalgwa salajin aideul" (Korean: 귀신 신발과 사라진 아이들)	November 8, 2018	N/A
39	15	"Unstoppable Temptation Raging Predator"; Transliteration: "Meomchul su eobsneun yuhog, bunnoui posigja" (Korean: 멈출 수 없는 유혹, 분노의 포식자)	November 15, 2018	N/A
40	16	"Inevitable Fear Soulless Pursuer"; Transliteration: "Pihal su eobsneun gongpo, yeonghon eobsneun chugyeogja" (Korean: 피할 수 없는 공포, 영혼 없는 추격자)	November 22, 2018	N/A
41	17	"The Dark Spreading Sound Forbidden Whisper"; Transliteration: "Peojyeonaganeun geom-eun soli, geumjidoen sogsag-im" (Korean: 퍼져나가는 검은 소리, 금지된 속삭임)	November 29, 2018	N/A
42	18	"Reawakened Bloody Fear Temptation of the Dark Night"; Transliteration: "Dasi kkaeeonan pisbich gongpo, geom-eunbam-ui yuhog" (Korean: 다시 깨어난 핏빛 공포, 검은밤의 유혹)	December 6, 2018	N/A
43	19	"Inescapable Fear The Scent of the Ashen Demon"; Transliteration: "Ppulichil su eobsneun gongpo, jaesbich agmaui hyang-gi" (Korean: 뿌리칠 수 없는 공포, 잿빛 악마의 향기)	December 13, 2018	N/A
44	20	"Soul Searching Nine-Tail A Thousand-Year Wait"; Transliteration: "Yeonghon-eul chajneun ahob gaeui kkoli, cheonnyeon-ui gidalim" (Korean: 영혼을 찾는 아홉 개의 꼬리, 천년의 기다림)	January 3, 2019	N/A
45	21	"A Dangerous Invite The Secret of the Wooden Mansion"; Transliteration: "Wiheomhan chodae, mogjojeotaeg-ui bimil" (Korean: 위험한 초대, 목조저택의 비밀)	January 10, 2019	7.269%
46	22	"The Beginning of Disaster Undying Flame"; Transliteration: "Jaeang-ui sijag, kkeojiji anhneun bulkkoch" (Korean: 재앙의 시작, 꺼지지 않는 불꽃)	January 17, 2019	47.1%
47	23	"Judgement Day The Truth of the Goblin Cave"; Transliteration: "Simpan-ui nal, dokkaebi dong-gul-ui jinsil" (Korean: 심판의 날, 도깨비 동굴의 진실)	January 24, 2019	4.341%

=== Season 3: Ghost Ball Double X (2020–21) ===
No. overall	No. in season	Title	Original release date	Viewership rating
Part 1: The 6 Prophecies (Note: 6gaeui yeeon (6개의 예언))
48	1	"The beginning of the prophecy, the sandstorm of the Black Reaper"; Transliteration: "Yeeon-ui sijag, geom-eun sasin-ui molaebalam" (Korean: 예언의 시작, 검은 사신의 모래바람)	March 5, 2020	8.44%
49	2	"Cries wandering through the alleys, cat ghosts attack!" Transliteration: "Golmog-eul tteodoneun ul-eumsoli, goyang-i gwisin-ui seubgyeog!" (Korean: 골목을 떠도는 울음소리, 고양이 귀신의 습격!)	March 12, 2020	10.72%
50	3	"The Black Rake of Fear, children trapped in the sewers" Transliteration: "Gongpoui geom-eun galkwi, hasugue gadhin aideul" (Korean: 공포의 검은 갈퀴, 하수구에 갇힌 아이들)	March 19, 2020	N/A
51	4	"Curse of Red Poison, Legend of the Angry God of Calamity"; Transliteration: "Bulg-eun dog-ui jeoju, bunnohan jaeangsin-ui jeonseol" (Korean: 붉은 독의 저주, 분노한 재앙신의 전설)	March 26, 2020	N/A
52	5	"Children in danger, traps in the haunted forest" Transliteration: "Wigie cheohan aideul, gwisin sup-ui hamjeong" (Korean: 위기에 처한 아이들, 귀신 숲의 함정)	April 2, 2020	N/A
53	6	"Want to be you! temptation of the little devil" Transliteration: "Nega doego sip-eo! jag-eun agmaui yuhog" (Korean: 네가 되고 싶어! 작은 악마의 유혹)	April 9, 2020	N/A
54	7	"The scream of sloth hell, the whistle of terror" Transliteration: "Natae jiog-ui bimyeong, gongpoui hwipalam soli" (Korean: 나태 지옥의 비명, 공포의 휘파람 소리)	April 16, 2020	N/A
55	8	"The prophecy started again, red eyes in the ground" Transliteration: "Dasi sijagdoen yeeon, ttang sog-ui bulg-eun nun" (Korean: 검다시 시작된 예언, 땅 속의 붉은 눈)	April 23, 2020	N/A
56	9	"A huge shadow, fear of the ice monster!" Transliteration: "Geodaehan geulimja, eol-eumgoesuui gongpo!" (Korean: 거대한 그림자, 얼음괴수의 공포!)	May 7, 2020	N/A
57	10	"Memories of a Past Life, The Alchemist and the Golden Bat"; Transliteration: "Jeonsaeng-ui gieog, yeongeumsulsawa hwang-geumbagjwi" (Korean: 전생의 기억, 연금술사와 황금박쥐)	May 14, 2020	8.04%
58	11	"The Screaming Garden of Horror, the Mascot Became a Devil"; Transliteration: "Gongpoui bimyeongdongsan, agmaga doen maseukoteu" (Korean: 공포의 비명동산, 악마가 된 마스코트)	May 21, 2020	N/A
59	12	"A child who sees ghosts, the menace of red eyes" Transliteration: "Gwisin boneun ai, bulg-eun siseon-ui wihyeob" (Korean: 귀신 보는 아이, 붉은 시선의 위협)	May 28, 2020	N/A
60	13	"Last Prophecy, Soulless Enforcer"; Transliteration: "Choehuui yeeon, yeonghon eobsneun jibhaengja" (Korean: 최후의 예언, 영혼 없는 집행자)	June 4, 2020	10.20%
Part 2: Suspicious Request (Note: Susanghan Uiloe (수상한 의뢰))
61	14	"The white-voiced beast, hide-and-seek of fear" Transliteration: "Hayan mogsoliui yasu, gongpoui sumbakkogjil" (Korean: 하얀 목소리의 야수, 공포의 숨바꼭질)	October 8, 2020	N/A
62	15	"Memories of Sad Resentment, Trap of the Purple Woman"; Transliteration: "Seulpeun wonhan-ui gieog, bolasbich yeoin-ui deoch" (Korean: 슬픈 원한의 기억, 보랏빛 여인의 덫)	October 15, 2020	N/A
63	16	"Black mud, the mystery of a village in the rain" Transliteration: "Geom-eun jinheulg, bi naelineun ma-eul-ui miseuteoli" (Korean: 검은 진흙, 비 내리는 마을의 미스터리)	October 22, 2020	N/A
64	17	"An ancient curse awakened, the attack of the Jiangshi"; Transliteration: "Kkaeeonan godaeui jeoju, gangsiui seubgyeog" (Korean: 깨어난 고대의 저주, 강시의 습격)	October 29, 2020	N/A
65	18	"A flower blooming in a shady room, an occupied apartment" Transliteration: "Geuneuljin bang-eseo pieonan kkoch, jeomlyeongdanghan apateu" (Korean: 그늘진 방에서 피어난 꽃, 점령당한 아파트)	November 12, 2020	N/A
66	19	"The first story of the vampire zombie Chupacabra"; Transliteration: "Heubhyeoljombi chupakabeula cheosbeonjjae iyagi" (Korean: 흡혈좀비 추파카브라 첫번째 이야기)	November 19, 2020	N/A
67	20	"The first story of the vampire zombie Chupacabra"; Transliteration: "Heubhyeoljombi chupakabeula cheosbeonjjae iyagi" (Korean: 흡혈좀비 추파카브라 두번째 이야기)	November 26, 2020	N/A
68	21	"Black smiles in paintings, people who disappeared" Transliteration: "Geulim sog-ui geom-eun miso, salajin salamdeul" (Korean: 그림 속의 검은 미소, 사라진 사람들)	December 3, 2020	N/A
69	22	"A song of sad memories, a red voice approaching" Transliteration: "Seulpeun gieog-ui nolae, dagaoneun bulg-eun mogsoli" (Korean: 슬픈 기억의 노래, 다가오는 붉은 목소리)	December 10, 2020	N/A
70	23	"Twisted desire, the temptation of the mask" Transliteration: "Dwiteullin yogmang, gamyeon-ui yuhog" (Korean: 뒤틀린 욕망, 가면의 유혹)	December 17, 2020	N/A
71	24	"Ugly Beauty's Eyes, Medusa"; Transliteration: "Chuaghan minyeoui nunbich, medusa" (Korean: 추악한 미녀의 눈빛, 메두사)	January 7, 2021	N/A
72	25	"The gaze in the dark, the fear of a school with no lights" Transliteration: "Eodum sog-ui siseon, bul kkeojin haggyoui gongpo" (Korean: 어둠 속의 시선, 불 꺼진 학교의 공포)	January 14, 2021	N/A
73	26	"The secret of Byeolbit Elementary School, the resurrection of Satoryong"; Transliteration: "Byeolbichchodeunghaggyoui bimil, satolyong-ui buhwal" (Korean: 별빛초등학교의 비밀, 사토룡의 부활)	January 21, 2021	N/A

=== Season 4: Ghost Ball Z (2021–22) ===
No. overall	No. in season	Title	Original release date	Viewership rating
Part 1: The Dark Exorcist (Note: Eodum-ui Toemasa (어둠의 퇴마사))
74	1	"The temptation beyond the window, the whisper of a huge shadow" Transliteration: "Changmun neomeoui yuhog, geodaehan geulimjaui sogsag-im" (Korean: 창문 너머의 유혹, 거대한 그림자의 속삭임)	September 16, 2021	4.86%
75	2	"The Beginning of a Clear Nightmare, Cursed Glasses"; Transliteration: "Seonmyeonghan agmong-ui sijag, Jeojubad-eun angyeong" (Korean: 선명한 악몽의 시작, 저주받은 안경)	September 23, 2021	N/A
76	3	"Fear of the bathroom, never-ending hide-and-seek" Transliteration: "Hwajangsil-ui gongpo, kkeutnaji anhneun sumbakkogjil" (Korean: 화장실의 공포, 끝나지 않는 숨바꼭질)	September 30, 2021	N/A
77	4	"Say your wish, the curse of suspicious chat" Transliteration: "Sowon-eul malhaebwa, susanghan chaeting-ui jeoju" (Korean: 소원을 말해봐, 수상한 채팅의 저주)	October 7, 2021	N/A
78	5	"Inescapable hell, cursed bells" Transliteration: "Domangchil su eobsneun jiog, jeojuui jongsoli" (Korean: 도망칠 수 없는 지옥, 저주의 종소리)	October 21, 2021	N/A
79	6	"The invisible hand, a puppet show of horror" Transliteration: "Boiji anhneun son, gongpoui inhyeong-geug" (Korean: 보이지 않는 손, 공포의 인형극)	October 28, 2021	N/A
80	7	"A sad cry, a nightmare on the road" Transliteration: "Seogeulpeun ul-eumsoli, dolo wiui agmong" (Korean: 서글픈 울음소리, 도로 위의 악몽)	November 4, 2021	50.2%
81	8	"The Secret of the Black Forest, Memories of Despair"; Transliteration: "Geom-eun sup-ui bimil, Dasi mannan jeolmang-ui gieog" (Korean: 검은 숲의 비밀, 다시 만난 절망의 기억)	November 11, 2021	N/A
82	9	"House of horror, trap from which there is no escape" Transliteration: "Gongpoui jib, ppajyeo naol su eobsneun hamjeong" (Korean: 공포의 집, 빠져 나올 수 없는 함정)	November 25, 2021	N/A
83	10	"Dangerous festival, flame inside a blazing mask" Transliteration: "Wiheomhan chugje, igeulgeolineun gamyeon sog bulkkoch" (Korean: 위험한 축제, 이글거리는 가면 속 불꽃)	December 2, 2021	N/A
84	11	"Those who can't close their eyes, the tragedy of an infected city (Part 1)"; Transliteration: "Nun gamji mos haneun jadeul, gam-yeomdoen dosiui bigeug (sang)" (Korean: 붉은 모래 폭풍의 습격, 위기의 신비아파트 (하))	December 9, 2021	N/A
85	12	"Those who can't close their eyes, the tragedy of an infected city (Part 2)"; Transliteration: "Nun gamji mos haneun jadeul, gam-yeomdoen dosiui bigeug (ha)" (Korean: 눈 감지 못 하는 자들, 감염된 도시의 비극 (하))	December 16, 2021	N/A
Part 2: Guido Exorcist (Note: Gwidotoemasa (귀도퇴마사))
86	13	"Private broadcast of horror, the secret of the black house" Transliteration: "Gongpoui gaein bangsong, geom-eun jib-ui bimil" (Korean: 공포의 개인 방송, 검은 집의 비밀)	April 28, 2022	4.9%
87	14	"A huge shadow, the scream of a beast that couldn't leave" Transliteration: "Geodaehan geulimja, tteonaji moshan maengsuui jeolgyu" (Korean: 거대한 그림자, 떠나지 못한 맹수의 절규)	May 5, 2022	N/A
88	15	"You can't cry, a voice that chases away tears" Transliteration: "Ulmyeon an dwae, nunmul-eul jjochneun mogsoli" (Korean: 울면 안 돼, 눈물을 쫓는 목소리)	May 12, 2022	N/A
89	16	"Shh, inaudible scream" Transliteration: "Swis, deulliji anhneun bimyeong" (Korean: 쉿, 들리지 않는 비명)	May 19, 2022	N/A
90	17	"The me who was taken away, another attack of me" Transliteration: "Ppaeasgyeobeolin na, tto daleun naui seubgyeog" (Korean: 빼앗겨버린 나, 또 다른 나의 습격)	May 26, 2022	N/A
91	18	"The secret revealed in the moonlight, the demon's roar resurrected" Transliteration: "Dalbich-e deuleonan bimil, doesal-anan agmaui pohyo" (Korean: 달빛에 드러난 비밀, 되살아난 악마의 포효)	June 9, 2022	N/A
92	19	"The stolen soul, the truth that rises to the surface (Part 1)"; Transliteration: "Ppaeasgin yeonghon, sumyeon wilo tteooleun jinsil (sang)" (Korean: 빼앗긴 영혼, 수면 위로 떠오른 진실 (상))	June 16, 2022	N/A
93	20	"The stolen soul, the truth that rises to the surface (Part 2)"; Transliteration: "Ppaeasgin yeonghon, sumyeon wilo tteooleun jinsil (ha)" (Korean: 빼앗긴 영혼, 수면 위로 떠오른 진실 (하))	June 23, 2022	N/A
94	21	"The flames of anger, the substance of scorched memories" Transliteration: "Bunnoui hwayeom, geueullin gieog-ui silche" (Korean: 분노의 화염, 그을린 기억의 실체)	June 30, 2022	N/A
95	22	"Fear never stops, the train to hell" Transliteration: "Meomchuji anhneun gongpo, jiog-eulo hyanghaneun yeolcha" (Korean: 멈추지 않는 공포, 지옥으로 향하는 열차)	July 14, 2022	N/A
96	23	"A broken seal, a tragedy hidden in the shadows (Part 1)"; Transliteration: "Kkaejyeobeolin bong-in, geuneul-e galyeojin bigeug (sang)" (Korean: 깨져버린 봉인, 그늘에 가려진 비극 (상))	July 21, 2022	N/A
97	24	"A broken seal, a tragedy hidden in the shadows (Part 2)"; Transliteration: "Kkaejyeobeolin bong-in, geuneul-e galyeojin bigeug (ha)" (Korean: 깨져버린 봉인, 그늘에 가려진 비극 (하))	July 28, 2022	N/A

=== Season 5: Ghost Ball ZERO (2023–24) ===
No. overall	No. in season	Title	Original release date
Part 1
98	1	"The ghost of the red origami crane, the earthworm" Transliteration: "Ppalgan jong-ihag-ui wonhon, jijeobgwi" (Korean: 빨간 종이학의 원혼, 지접귀)	March 30, 2023
99	2	"The Temptation of the Evil Violin, the String Demon"; Transliteration: "Saaghan baiollin-ui yuhog, hyeon-aggwi" (Korean: 사악한 바이올린의 유혹, 현악귀)	April 6, 2023
100	3	"Am I pretty? Red mask of fear" Transliteration: "Na yeppeo? Gongpoui ppalganmaseukeu" (Korean: 나 예뻐? 공포의 빨간마스크)	April 13, 2023
101	4	"The King of Bugs, Chunghogwi's Attack"; Transliteration: "Beolledeul-ui wang, chunghogwiui seubgyeog" (Korean: 벌레들의 왕, 충호귀의 습격)	April 20, 2023
102	5	"Budding cries, the root monster's truth" Transliteration: "Ssagteuneun ul-eumsoli, ppuli goesuui jinsil" (Korean: 싹트는 울음소리, 뿌리 괴수의 진실)	April 27, 2023
103	6	"Escape from the dangerous invitation, horror game!" Transliteration: "Wiheomhan chodae, gongpo geim-eseo talchulhala!" (Korean: 위험한 초대, 공포 게임에서 탈출하라!)	May 11, 2023 (Note: These episodes were delayed, both Episode 6 on May 4, 2023 and 22 on February 8, 2024 on Tooniverse before they aired on The Haunted House: The Dimensional Goblin and the Seven Worlds on May 4, 2023 and February 8, 2024.)
104	7	"The curse of the confined well, the legend of the slime monster" Transliteration: "Han maejhin umul-ui jeoju, jeom-aeg goemul-ui jeonseol" (Korean: 한 맺힌 우물의 저주, 점액 괴물의 전설)	May 18, 2023
105	8	"False Love's Oath, Fallen Cupid's Temptation"; Transliteration: "Geojisdoen salang-ui maengse, talag kyupideuui yuhog" (Korean: 거짓된 사랑의 맹세, 타락 큐피드의 유혹)	May 25, 2023
106	9	"The suspicious secret of the construction site" Transliteration: "Gongsajang-ui susanghan bimil" (Korean: 공사장의 수상한 비밀)	June 1, 2023
107	10	"Attack of the Red Sand Storm, Shinbi Apartment in Crisis (Part 1)"; Transliteration: "Bulg-eun molae pogpung-ui seubgyeog, wigiui sinbiapateu (sang)" (Korean: 붉은 모래 폭풍의 습격, 위기의 신비아파트 (상))	June 8, 2023
108	11	"Attack of the Red Sand Storm, Shinbi Apartment in Crisis (Part 2)"; Transliteration: "Bulg-eun molae pogpung-ui seubgyeog, wigiui sinbiapateu (ha)" (Korean: 붉은 모래 폭풍의 습격, 위기의 신비아파트 (하))	June 15, 2023
Part 2
109	12	"Has the ghost come? Forbidden Spell, Bunshinsaba"; Transliteration: "Gwisinnim osyeossseubnikka? Geumjidoen jumun, bunsinsaba" (Korean: 귀신님 오셨습니까? 금지된 주문, 분신사바)	November 30, 2023
110	13	"Sweet addiction, secrets of disappeared children" Transliteration: "Dalkomhan jungdog, salajin aideul-ui bimil" (Korean: 달콤한 중독, 사라진 아이들의 비밀)	December 7, 2023
111	14	"Cruel Laughter, Smile Challenge"; Transliteration: "Janhoghan Us-eum, Seumail Chaellinji" (Korean: 잔혹한 웃음, 스마일 챌린지)	December 14, 2023
112	15	"Library of Fear, The Truth Behind Ghost Stories on the 4th Floor"; Transliteration: "Gongpoui Doseogwan, 4cheung Goedam-ui Jinsil" (Korean: 공포의 도서관, 4층 괴담의 진실)	December 21, 2023
113	16	"Family Trip in Crisis, Spooky Ghost Camping Site"; Transliteration: "Wigiui Gajog-yeohaeng, Ossaghan Gwisin Kaempingjang" (Korean: 위기의 가족여행, 오싹한 귀신 캠핑장)	December 28, 2023
114	17	"Fight with your Soul! Soccer Match with Ghosts"; Transliteration: "Yeonghon-eul Geolgo Ssawola! Gwisingwaui Chuggu Daegyeol" (Korean: 영혼을 걸고 싸워라! 귀신과의 축구 대결)	January 4, 2024
115	18	"Unidentified Flying Object, Chase the UFO!"; Transliteration: "Mihwag-in Bihaengmulche, UFOleul Chugyeoghala!" (Korean: 미확인 비행물체, UFO를 추격하라!)	January 11, 2024
116	19	"The Black Monster in the Apartment, The Mystery of Polluted Water"; Transliteration: "Apateuui Geom-eun Goesu, Oyeomdoen Mul-ui Miseuteoli" (Korean: 아파트의 검은 괴수, 오염된 물의 미스터리)	January 18, 2024
117	20	"Forbidden Forest and Nightmare Trap"; Transliteration: "Geumjidoen Supgwa agmong-ui Deoch" (Korean: 금지된 숲과 악몽의 덫)	January 25, 2024
118	21	"Hungry Soul Hunter, Fearful Ghost Tiger"; Transliteration: "Gulmjulin Yeonghon Sanyangkkun, Gongpoui Gwisin Holang-i" (Korean: 굶주린 영혼 사냥꾼, 공포의 귀신 호랑이)	February 1, 2024
119	22	"Eternal Snowstorm, Escape from the Frozen Ski Resort"; Transliteration: "Yeong-wonhan Nunbola, Eol-eobut-eun Seukijang-eseo Talchulhala" (Korean: 영원한 눈보라, 얼어붙은 스키장에서 탈출하라)	February 15, 2024
120	23	"Do You Want It? The Temptation of the Forbidden Gift"; Transliteration: "Gajgo Sipni? Geumjidoen Seonmul-ui Yuhog" (Korean: 갖고 싶니? 금지된 선물의 유혹)	February 22, 2024
121	24	"Curse of Lies, The Truth About Pinocchio"; Transliteration: "Geojismal-ui Jeoju, Pinokioui Jinsil" (Korean: 거짓말의 저주, 피노키오의 진실)	February 29, 2024
122	25	"The Second Coming of the Red Moon, Lamia, The Reaper of Disease (Part 1)"; Transliteration: "Bulg-eun Dal-ui Jaelim, Jilbyeong-ui Sasin Lamia(sang)" (Korean: 붉은 달의 재림, 질병의 사신 라미아(상))	March 7, 2024
123	26	"The Second Coming of the Red Moon, Lamia, The Reaper of Disease (Part 2)"; Transliteration: "Bulg-eun Dal-ui Jaelim, Jilbyeong-ui Sasin Lamia(ha)" (Korean: 붉은 달의 재림, 질병의 사신 라미아(하))	March 14, 2024

== Shorts (2019–23) ==
No.	Title	Original air date
1	"Hari's Day"; Transliteration: "Sinbiapateu: Haliui teugbyeolhan halu" (Korean: 신비아파트: 하리의 특별한 하루)	August 23, 2019
2	"The Haunted House Christmas Special: Grandma's Wish, Wheat Donggwi from North Korea"; Transliteration: "Sinbiapateu keuliseumaseu teugbyeolpyeon halmeoniui sowon, bug-eseo on mildong-gwi" (Korean: 신비아파트 크리스마스 특별편 할머니의 소원, 북에서 온 밀동귀)	December 24, 2020
3	"The Haunted House Special: Cheolgungi, an exorcist in the forest of Cheorwon"; Transliteration: "Sinbiapateu seupesyeol: Cheol-won-ui supsog toemasa, cheolgung-i" (신비아파트 스페셜: 철원의 숲속 퇴마사, 철궁이)	December 23, 2021
4	"The Haunted House Special: Cheolgung meets again and the legend of Woljeong-ri, Cheorwon"; Transliteration: "Sinbiapateu seupesyeol dasi mannan cheolgung-iwa cheol-won woljeongliui jeonseol" (신비아파트 스페셜 다시 만난 철궁이와 철원 월정리의 전설)	December 22, 2022
5	"The Haunted House: Find Boogie's invention!" Transliteration: "Sinbiapateu: Bugiui balmyeongpum-eul chaj-ala!" (신비아파트: 부기의 발명품을 찾아라!)	June 3, 2023

== Home media release ==
=== Pilots ===
Date	Discs	Episodes	Reference
November 29, 2018	1	1–4	

=== Season 1 ===
Volume	Date	Discs	Episodes	Reference
1	February 20, 2020	1	1–4	
2	May 15, 2020	1	5–8	
3	August 6, 2020	1	9–12	
4	November 9, 2020	1	13–16	
5	February 2, 2021	1	17–20	
6	March 4, 2021	1	21–24	

=== Season 2 ===
Volume		Date	Discs	Episodes	Reference
Part 1	1	June 11, 2021	1	25–27	
Part 1	2	July 9, 2021	1	28–30	
Part 1	3	August 6, 2021	1	31–33	
Part 1	4	June 10, 2021	1	34–37	
Part 2	1	October 6, 2021	1	38–40	
Part 2	2	November 9, 2021	1	41–43	
Part 2	3	December 3, 2021	1	44–47	

=== Season 3 ===
Volume		Date	Discs	Episodes	Reference
The 6 Prophecies	1	March 10, 2022	1	48–50	
The 6 Prophecies	2	April 12, 2022	1	51–53	
The 6 Prophecies	3	May 10, 2022	1	54–56	
The 6 Prophecies	4	June 10, 2022	1	57–60	
Suspicious Request	1	July 12, 2022	1	61–63	
Suspicious Request	2	August 11, 2022	1	64–66	
Suspicious Request	3	September 16, 2022	1	67–69	
Suspicious Request	4	October 13, 2022	1	70–73	

=== Season 4 ===
Volume		Date	Discs	Episodes	Reference
The Dark Exorcist	1	July 12, 2023	1	74–76	
The Dark Exorcist	2	August 8, 2023	1	77–79	
The Dark Exorcist	3	September 19, 2023	1	80–82	
The Dark Exorcist	4	October 13, 2023	1	83–85	
Guido Exorcist	1	November 15, 2023	1	86–88	
Guido Exorcist	2	January 19, 2024	1	89–91	
Guido Exorcist	3	February 20, 2024	1	92–94	
Guido Exorcist	4	March 12, 2024	1	95–97	

=== Season 5 ===
Volume		Date	Discs	Episodes	Reference
Part 1	1	December 6, 2024	1	98–101	
Part 1	2	February 19, 2025	1	102–105	
Part 1	3	March 14, 2025	1	106–108	
Part 2	4	April 15, 2025	1	109–112	
Part 2	5	May 20, 2025	1	113–116	
Part 2	6	June 13, 2025	1	117–120	
Part 2	7	July 16, 2025	1	121–123	
