= The Haunted House Special: The Vampire of Light and the Child of Darkness =

South Korean television special

- Official release poster
- Hangul: 신비아파트 특별판: 빛의 뱀파이어와 어둠의 아이
- RR: Sinbi apateu teukbyeolpan: bichui baempaieowa eodumui ai
- MR: Sinbi ap'at'ŭ t'ŭkpyŏlp'an: pich'ŭi paemp'aiŏwa ŏdumŭi ai
- Genre: Action-adventure; Fantasy; Horror
- Based on: The Haunted House
- Written by: Kim Jong-min; Ryu Jeon-gha
- Directed by: Seok Jong-seo; Kim Myung-hyun; Gong Byeong-pil; Lee Bo-hyun; Son Min-young; Kim Min-ah
- Starring: Myung-jun Kim; Shin Yong-woo; Choi Seung-hoon; Jo Hyeon-jeong; Park Shi-yoon; Kim Ki-hyun
- Opening theme: "The Secret" by Seongjin Shin
- Ending theme: "To a Friend" by Arin Shin
- Country of origin: South Korea
- Original language: Korean

Production
- Running time: 55 minutes
- Production company: Studio BAZOOKA

Original release
- Network: TVING
- Release: December 22, 2021

The Haunted House Special: The Vampire of Light and the Child of Darkness (Korean: 신비아파트 특별판: 빛의 뱀파이어와 어둠의 아이) is a South Korean animated television special directed by Seok Jong-seo for the streaming service TVING, based on the franchise The Haunted House. This is the first franchise to be a OVA. The special episode was produced by Studio BAZOOKA, The Haunted House Special: The Vampire of Light and the Child of Darkness was released on TVING on December 22, 2021. The special episode takes place between the events of the seasons 3 and 4, following Leon Raymond where his teacher becoming a vampire and mind controlled by Barlow.

A sequel of the special episode titled The Haunted House Special: Joseon Exorcism Annals premiered on July 14 to 21, 2023, 4 episodes in half.

== Voice cast ==
- Myung-jun Kim as Leon Raymond
- Shin Yong-woo as Kang-lim Choi
- Choi Seung-hoon as Ian
- Jo Hyeon-jeong as Shinbi
- Park Shi-yoon as Sara
- Kim Ki-hyun as Barlow
- Lee Hyun as Luman
- Jun Tae-youl as Joachim
- Kwon Hyuk-soo as Aniceto
- Kim Young-eun as Hari Koo
- Kim Chae-ha as Doori Koo

== Release ==
The Haunted House Special: The Vampire of Light and the Child of Darkness was released on December 22, 2021, on TVING, and later the special episode was aired on cable network Tooniverse on February 24, 2022.

== Production ==
During the Children's Day special event in May, 2021 as a teaser, Tooniverse announced that the series would be a special episode of OVAs from the OTT streaming platform TVING; Leon talks to Heewon about his teacher name, Luman happened to become a vampire as a child in the Season 2, second part, episode 7.

The original soundtrack opening "The Secret" and ending "To a Friend" was performed by the Korean singer Seongjin Shin and Arin Shin.
