= The Haunted House Special: Red Eyed Reaper =

2024 South Korean animated film

- Theatrical release poster
- Hangul: 신비아파트 특별편: 붉은 눈의 사신
- RR: Sinbi apateu teukbyeolpyeon: bulgeun nunui sasin
- MR: Sinbi ap'at'ŭ t'ŭkpyŏlp'yŏn: pulgŭn nunŭi sasin
- Directed by: Park Hong-geun
- Starring: Jo Hyeon-jeong; Kim Young-eun; Kim Chae-ha; Shin Yong-woo; Yang Jeong-hwa
- Production companies: CJ ENM Co.; Studio BAZOOKA
- Distributed by: CJ ENM Co.
- Release date: 14 August 2024
- Running time: 77 minutes
- Country: South Korea
- Language: Korean

The Haunted House Special: Red Eyed Reaper (Korean: 신비아파트 특별편: 붉은 눈의 사신) is a 2024 South Korean animated fantasy film directed by Park Hong-geun. Released on August 14, 2024, the film was exclusively shown at CGV theaters. The film is a recompilation of The Haunted House: Ghost Ball ZERO.

== Voice cast ==
Character	Korean
Shinbi	Jo Hyeon-jeong
Hari Koo	Kim Young-eun
Doori Koo	Kim Chae-ha
Kang-lim Choi	Shin Yong-woo
Geumbi	Yang Jeong-hwa
Gaeun Lee	Yeo Min-jeong
Guido Hyun	Kim Jang

== Synopsis ==
As a mysterious and dangerous affliction known as the "Red Eye" curse begins sweeping across the region, Hari and her companions find themselves forced into another high-stakes battle to save humanity. The crisis is further complicated by severe strain within the group: Choi Kang-rim takes on the isolated role of an independent ghost exorcist, and Ga-eun falls victim to the spreading curse. Overwhelmed by personal concerns for her close friends while a crimson moon signals impending doom, Hari must rally her remaining allies to track down the source of the supernatural plague, confront the entity responsible, and break the curse before the world faces total destruction.

== Production and release ==
In July 2024, it was announced that the film would be a recompilation of the episodes The Haunted House: Ghost Ball ZERO, and would be released exclusively at CGV theaters on August 14, 2024. The first part of the season aired eleven episodes on Tooniverse from March 30, 2023, to June 15, 2023, and the second part aired fifteen episodes from November 30, 2023, to March 13, 2024.
