= The Haunted House: The Dimensional Goblin and the Seven Worlds =

2022 South Korean animated film

- Theatrical release poster
- Hangul: 신비아파트 극장판 차원도깨비와 7개의 세계
- Hanja: 神秘아파트 劇場版 次元도깨비와 7個의 世界
- RR: Sinbi apateu geukjangpan chawon dokkaebiwa 7gaeui segye
- MR: Sinbi ap'at'ŭ kŭkchangp'an ch'awŏn tokkaebiwa 7kaeŭi segye
- Directed by: Byeon Young-Kyu
- Starring: Jo Hyeon-jeong; Jeonghwa Yang; Youngeun Kim; Chaeha kim; Yang Jeong-hwa; King Sae-bom
- Production companies: CJ ENM Co.; Studio BAZOOKA
- Distributed by: CJ ENM Co.
- Release date: 14 December 2022
- Running time: 103 minutes
- Country: South Korea
- Language: Korean
- Box office: $3,104,239 world wide

The Haunted House: The Dimensional Goblin and the Seven Worlds (Korean: 신비아파트 극장판 차원도깨비와 7개의 세계) is a South Korean animated film directed by Byeon Young-Kyu. The film was released on December 14, 2022.

== Production ==
After the credit scene, the film was succeeded by the next season, The Haunted House: Ghost Ball ZERO, which premiered on March 30, 2023, on Tooniverse in South Korea. It was released on DVD in South Korea on April 13 of the same year.

The film aired on Tooniverse in South Korea on March 30, 2023, and then later aired again on May 4, and on February 8, 2024, before delaying the 6th episodes in the first part and the 11th episodes in the second part.

The original soundtrack "Beyond Dimension" was performed by the Korean singer J.Fla.

== Reception ==
The film grossed $3,104,239 world wide.

== See also ==
- The Haunted House: The Secret of the Cave
- The Haunted House: The Sky Goblin VS Jormungandr
- South Korean animation
- Anime-influenced animation
