= 4:4:4 =

4:4:4 may refer to:

- Digital images or video in which all color components have the same sampling rate, thus not using chroma subsampling
- Another name for the RGB color space

== See also ==
- 444 (disambiguation)
- 4:44 (disambiguation)
