= The Haunted House Special: Joseon Exorcism Annals =

South Korean animated television miniseries

- Promotional poster
- Hangul: 신비아파트 특별판: 조선퇴마실록
- RR: Sinbi apateu teukbyeolpan: Joseon toema sillok
- MR: Sinbi ap'at'ŭ t'ŭkpyŏlp'an: Chosŏn t'oema sillok
- Genre: Action-adventure; Fantasy; Horror
- Based on: The Haunted House
- Written by: Kim Jong-min; Ryu Jeon-gha
- Directed by: Seok Jong-seo; Lee Jong-hyuk; Kim yu-min; Jang ji-young; Noh Yu-ra
- Starring: Kim Young-eun; Kim Chae-ha; Jo Hyeon-jeong; Shin Yong-woo; Yang Jeong-hwa
- Opening theme: "Hariga" by Jane Lee (TO1)
- Ending theme: "Hi To You" by Song Yujin
- Country of origin: South Korea
- Original language: Korean
- No. of episodes: 4

Production
- Running time: 29–35 minutes
- Production company: Studio BAZOOKA

Original release
- Network: TVING
- Release: July 14 – July 21, 2023

The Haunted House Special: Joseon Exorcism Annals (Korean: 신비아파트 특별판: 조선퇴마실록) is a South Korean animated television miniseries directed by Seok Jong-seo for the streaming service TVING, based on the Haunted House franchise. This is the second franchise to be a OVA, it is a sequel to The Haunted House Special: The Vampire of Light and the Child of Darkness. The Haunted House Special: Joseon Exorcism Annals was released on TVING on July 14 to 21, 2023. The series takes place between the events of the season 4, and follows Hari and her friends were time traveling through to the past by Geumbi in the Joseon.

== Voice cast ==
- Kim Young-eun as Hari Koo
- Kim Chae-ha as Doori Koo
- Jo Hyeon-jeong as Shinbi
- Shin Yong-woo as Kang-lim Choi
- Yang Jeong-hwa as Geumbi

== Episodes ==
No.	Title	Original release date
1	"Hyeonrang, black wolf with red eyes" Transliteration: "Hyeonlang, bulg-eun nun-ui geom-eun neugdae" (Korean: 현랑, 붉은 눈의 검은 늑대)	July 14, 2023
2	"Hyeon-gwi, servant with a strange mask" Transliteration: "Hyeongwi, goeihan gamyeon-ui sijong" (Korean: 현귀, 괴이한 가면의 시종)	July 14, 2023
3	"Joseon Dynasty's Gakgui, Immortal Gkokdu"; Transliteration: "Joseon gaggwi, bulmyeol-ui kkogdu" (Korean: 조선 각귀, 불멸의 꼭두)	July 21, 2023
4	"King of demons, half-human, half-ghost puppeteer" Transliteration: "Gaggwideul-ui wang, ban-inbangwi inhyeongsulsa" (Korean: 각귀들의 왕, 반인반귀 인형술사)	July 21, 2023

== Release ==
The Haunted House Special: Joseon Exorcism Annals premiered on TVING on July 14 to 21, 2023, with four episodes in half. The special episode aired on Tooniverse on November 2, 2023.

== Production ==
On April 27, 2023, it was announced as a teaser poster that this franchise is going to be a second Special OVA on the OTT streaming platform TVING. After The Haunted House: Ghost Ball ZERO was ended in part 1, the special episode was reveal on June 16, 2023, to be released on July 14, 2023.

The original soundtrack opening "Hariga" and ending "Hi To You" was performed by the Korean singer Jane Lee (TO1) and Song Yujin.
