= 4:44 (disambiguation) =

4:44 is a 2017 album by Jay-Z.

4:44 may refer to:

== Music ==
- 4:44 Tour, a 2017 live tour in support of the album
- "4:44" (song), a song by Jay-Z from the album of the same name
- "4:44", a 2019 song by Park Bom

== Other ==
- 4:44 Last Day on Earth, a 2011 film directed by Abel Ferrara

== See also ==
- 444 (disambiguation)
- 4:4:4 (disambiguation)
