= List of video games using NFC =

This is a list of video games that use near field communication (NFC) technology.

Currently, games have leveraged NFC in unlocking additional features through payment. This takes the form of a direct transaction over NFC or by purchasing a physical item, which signals to the platform that a certain set of features has been purchased (e.g. Skylanders). This list catalogues gaming NFC platforms by device.

== Mobile ==
=== Android ===
- Gun Bros.
- Near Field Ninja
- NFC Cards
- Skylanders, with an NFC base.
- The Haunted House: Soul Fighters, with an NFC base.

=== iOS ===
==== As item-triggered game enhancement ====
- Skylanders, with an NFC base.

==== As payment ====
- In-App Purchases

Here, games that leverage Apple's In-App Purchase framework use information stored in the NFC Secure Element to process the purchase through Apple Pay. While an NFC radio is not used here, the NFC protocol is used nonetheless.

== Console ==
=== Nintendo Wii, Wii U, Switch, Switch 2, 3DS and 2DS ===
==== As item-triggered game enhancement ====
- Pokémon Rumble U NFC Figure
- Amiibo, built into Nintendo consoles since 2014. Works with Wii U, New Nintendo 3DS/3DS XL, New Nintendo 2DS XL, Nintendo Switch, Nintendo Switch 2 and older Nintendo 3DS/Nintendo 2DS systems via a peripheral device.
- Disney Infinity, with an NFC base. Works with Wii, Nintendo 3DS, Nintendo 2DS and Wii U.
- Lego Dimensions, with an NFC base. Works with Wii U.
- Skylanders, with an NFC base. Works with Wii, Nintendo 3DS, Nintendo 2DS and Wii U.
  - The Nintendo Switch version of Skylanders: Imaginators uses the NFC built into the game controller, it is also has full backward compatibility with Nintendo Switch 2. Some functionalities are missing compared to the other versions.

==== As payment ====
- The Wii U GamePad controller, Joy-Con R, Joy-Con 2 R, Nintendo Switch Pro Controller and Nintendo Switch 2 Pro Controller can read information from an NFC data source.

=== PlayStation ===
- Disney Infinity, with an NFC base. Works with PlayStation 3, PlayStation Vita, PlayStation 4 and PlayStation 5.
- Lego Dimensions, with an NFC base. Works with PlayStation 3, PlayStation 4 and PlayStation 5.
- Skylanders, with an NFC base. Works with PlayStation 3, PlayStation 4 and PlayStation 5.

=== Xbox ===
While NFC bases are normally interoperable between all platforms, the Xbox 360, Xbox One and Xbox Series X require specific bases that are compatible only with the respective platform.

- Disney Infinity, with an NFC base.
- Lego Dimensions, with an NFC base.
- Skylanders, with an NFC base.
