= Yeo Min-jeong =

South Korean voice actress (born 1975)

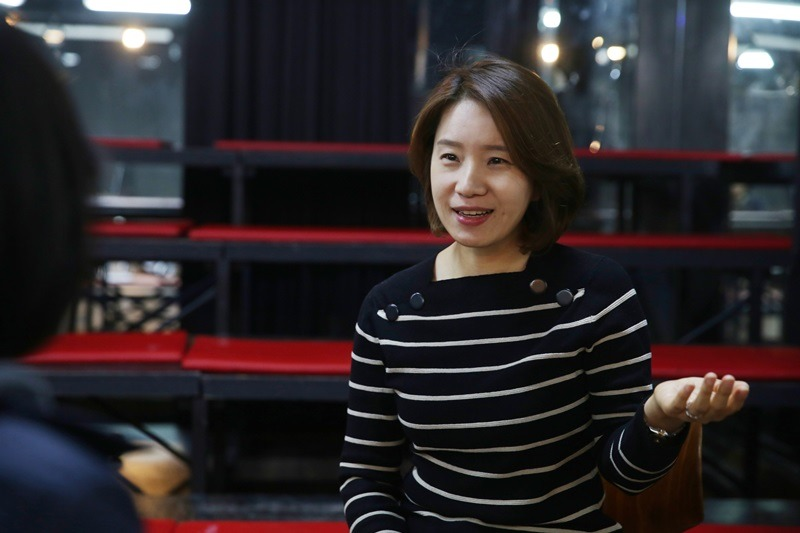
- Yeo in 2017
- Born: May 13, 1975 (age 51); Seoul, South Korea
- Occupation: Voice actress
- Years active: 2000–present
- Spouse: Ha Do-kwon (m. 2004)
- Children: 2

Yeo Min-jeong (Korean: 여민정; born May 13, 1975) is a South Korean voice actress. She joined the On-Media Voice Acting Division's voice acting division in 2000. She was known for voicing Gaeun Lee from Tooniverse's The Haunted House animated series.

== Personal life ==
On an episode of Same Bed, Different Dreams 2 aired on March 24, 2020, Ha Do-kwon revealed that he has been married to Min-jeong for 16 years.

== Role ==
=== Broadcast TV ===
- The Haunted House (Tooniverse original network) - Gaeun Lee
- Hello Jadoo (Tooniverse original network) - Choi Jadoo
- Angelic Layer (Korea TV edition, Tooniverse) - Ringo Seto / Kaede Saito
- Aria The Animation (Korea TV edition, Animax) - Alice Carroll
- Aria The Natural (Korea TV edition, Animax) - Alice Carroll
- Aria The Origination (Korea TV edition, Animax) - Alice Carroll
- Ashita no Nadja (Korea TV edition, Tooniverse) - Collette Preminger
- Azumanga Daioh (Korea TV edition, Tooniverse) - Chiyo Mihama
- Bleach (Korea TV Edition, Tooniverse) - Yuzu Kurosaki
- Bratz Kidz: Sleep-Over Adventure (Korea TV Edition, Tooniverse) - Ginger
- Chrono Crusade (Korea TV edition, Tooniverse) - Azmaria Hendric
- Danny Phantom (Korea TV edition, Tooniverse) - Jazmine Fenton
- Detective Conan (Korea TV edition, Tooniverse) - Ayumi Yoshida
- Detective School Q (Korea TV edition, Tooniverse) - Megumi Minami
- Dokkiri Doctor (Korea TV edition, Tooniverse) - Kaori Tajima
- Fushigiboshi no Futagohime Gyu! (Korea TV edition, Tooniverse) - Chiffon
- Galaxy Angel (Korea TV edition, Animax) - Ranpha Franboise
- Gakuen Alice (Korea TV edition, Tooniverse) - Hotaru Imai
- Go! Princess PreCure (Aniove TV) - Haruka Haruno/Cure Flora
- Great Teacher Onizuka (Korea TV edition, Tooniverse) - Nanako Mizuki
- Haré+Guu (Korea TV edition, Tooniverse) - Guu
- Hero Circle (EBS original network) - Sena / Stephanie
- Hell Girl (Korea TV edition, Animax) - Ai Enma
- Jubei-chan: The Ninja Girl (Korea TV edition, Tooniverse) - Ayunosuke Odago
- Kanon (Korea TV edition, Animax) - Kaori Misaka / Mishio Amano
- Lucky Star (Korea TV edition, Animax) - Akira Kogami
- Magical Meow Meow Taruto (Korea TV edition, Animax) - Taruto
- Mahōjin Guru Guru (Korea TV edition, Tooniverse) - Juju
- Mobile Suit Gundam Wing (Korea TV edition, Tooniverse) - Catherine Bloom
- Miraculous: Tales of Ladybug & Cat Noir (Korea TV edition, EBS) - Marinette Dupain-Cheng / Ladybug
- Naruto (Korea TV edition, Tooniverse) - Sakura Haruno
- Ouran High School Host Club (Korea TV edition, Tooniverse) - Mitsukuni Haninozuka
- Petite Princess Yucie (Korea TV edition, JEI-TV) - Yucie / Belbel
- Phantom Thief Jeanne (Korea TV edition, Tooniverse) - Jeanne d`Ark
- Rugrats (Korea TV edition, EBS) - Angelica Pickles
- Ranma ½ (Korea TV edition, Tooniverse) - Akane Tendo
- Shrine of the Morning Mist (Korea TV edition, Tooniverse) - Yukie Uranami
- Shugo Chara! (Korea TV edition, Tooniverse) - Rima Mashiro
- The Grim Adventures of Billy & Mandy (Korea TV edition, Cartoon Network) - Mandy
- To Heart (Korea TV edition, Tooniverse) - Serika Kurusugawa / Multi
- Toradora! (Korea TV edition, Animax) - Taiga Aisaka
- Trinity Blood (Korea TV edition, Tooniverse) - Kate Scott
- UFO Baby (Korea TV edition, Tooniverse) - Luu
- Yumeiro Patissiere (Korea TV edition, Tooniverse) - Vanilla

=== Film ===
- Keroro Gunso the Super Movie - Mirara
- InuYasha the Movie: Affections Touching Across Time - Ruri

=== Video games ===
- Cookie Run: Kingdom - Pancake Cookie, Croissant Cookie
- Elsword (MMORPG by KOG) - Ara Haan
- Getcha Ghost - Gaeun Lee
- MapleStory (MMORPG by Nexon) - Xenon (female), Roo-D
- Guardian Tales | Korean - Female Knight
- Brown Dust 2 - Scheherazade
- Tartaros Online - Ruko
- Genshin Impact - Alice

== See also ==
- Tooniverse
