= DreamNote =

South Korean girl group

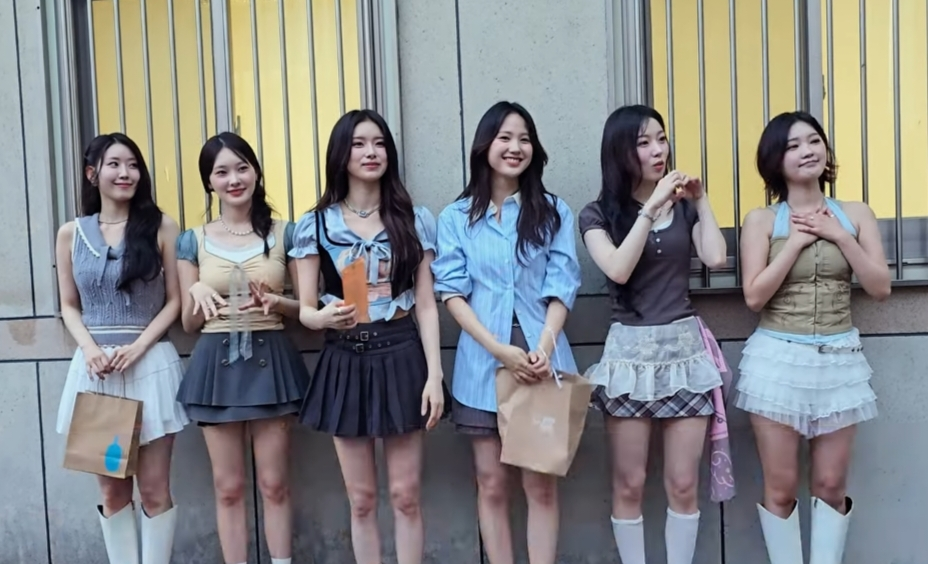
- DreamNote in September 2025

Background information
- Origin: Seoul, South Korea
- Genre: K-pop
- Years active: 2018–2025
- Label: iMe Korea
- Past members: Boni; Youi; Lara; Miso; Sumin; Eunjo; Habin; Hanbyeol
- Website: dreamnote.co.kr

DreamNote (Korean: 드림노트), was a South Korean girl group formed by iMe Korea. They debuted on November 7, 2018 with their debut single album Dreamlike. The group consisted of six members: Sumin, Eunjo, Lara, Miso, Youi and Boni, originally as eight members, Habin and Hanbyeol left in September 2019. On October 22, 2025, it was announced that the group will conclude all activities after their contracts end on November 7.

In October 2024, the group released their first single album in Japan, Joyful Green.

== Members ==
Adapted from the group's Japan official website and Makestar.

- Boni (보니) – vocalist, dancer
- Youi (유아이) – leader, vocalist, dancer
- Lara (라라) – vocalist
- Miso (미소) – vocalist
- Sumin (수민) – rapper, dancer, vocalist
- Eunjo (은조) – vocalist

Former

- Habin (하빈)
- Hanbyeol (한별)

== Discography ==
=== Single albums ===
Title	Details	Peak chart positions	Sales
Title	Details	KOR	Sales
Dreamlike	Released: November 7, 2018; Label: iMe KOREA, Kakao M; Formats: CD, digital download; Track listing: 1. "In the Beginning" (빛의 시작); 2. "Dream Note"; 3. "Like You" (좋아하나봐); 4. "Fresh! Fresh!"; 5. "Dream Note" (Inst.); 6. "Like You" (좋아하나봐) (Inst.)	26	KOR: 3,532
Dream:us	Released: March 12, 2019; Label: iMe KOREA, Kakao M; Formats: CD, digital download; Track listing: 1. "¡Bienvenido! (Welcome Back)"; 2. "Hakuna Matata" (하쿠나 마타타); 3. "My Hobby Is You" (취미는 너); 4. "Cong Cong (Uhh Ohh)"; 5. "Hakuna Matata" (하쿠나 마타타) (Inst.)	25	KOR: 4,253
Dream Wish	Released: January 8, 2020; Label: iMe KOREA, Kakao M; Formats: CD, digital download; Track listing: 1. "Wish" (바라다); 2. "Love Is So Amazing"; 3. "Bittersweet"; 4. "La Isla Bonita" (꿈의 섬으로); 5. "Wish" (바라다) (Inst.)	33	KOR: 4,984
Dreams Alive	Released: October 26, 2021; Label: iMe KOREA, Kakao Entertainment; Formats: CD, digital download; Track listing: 1. "Ghost"; 2. "Night" (밤); 3. "Thank You" (오늘보다 내일 더); 4. "Ghost" (Inst.)	41	—N/a
Secondary Page	Released: April 12, 2023; Label: iMe KOREA, Kakao Entertainment; Formats: CD, digital download; Track listing: 1. "Lemonade"; 2. "Blue"; 3. "Broken"	35	KOR: 12,748

=== Singles ===
Title	Year	Peak chart positions	Album
Title	Year	KOR	Album
Korean
"Dream Note"	2018	—	Dreamlike
"Hakuna Matata" (하쿠나 마타타)	2019	—	Dream:us
"Wish" (바라다)	2020	—	Dream Wish
"GHOST" (Note: "GHOST (Chinese Version)" was released on February 18, 2022.)	2021	— (Note: "Ghost" did not enter the Gaon Digital Chart, but peaked at number 99 on the Gaon Download Chart.)	Dreams Alive
"Night (Winter Ver.)" (밤)	2021	—	Non-album single
"BLUE"	2023	— (Note: "BLUE" did not enter the Circle Digital Chart, but peaked at number 137 on the Circle Download Chart.)	Secondary Page
"Lemonade" (Note: "Lemonade (Eng Ver.)" was released on June 22, 2023.)	2023	— (Note: "Lemonade" did not enter the Circle Digital Chart, but peaked at number 91 on the Circle Download Chart.)	Secondary Page
"Joyful Green" (Korean vs.)	2024	—	Non-album single
Japanese
"Joyful Green" (Japanese vs.)	2024	—	Non-album single
"—" denotes items that did not chart or were not released.

=== Soundtrack appearances ===
Song	Year	Member(s)	Album
"As You Dream"	2018	Lara, Miso	When Time Stopped OST Part 1
"TAYO OPENING" (꼬마버스 타요 오프닝)	2019	Lara, Miso, Sumin, Hanbyeol	TAYO X DreamNote
"One Love"	2020	Boni, Lara	Phantom The Secret Agent
"Only U"	2020	Lara	Mr. Heart (OST)
"Flower Scent" (꽃향기)	2020	Lara	Nobleman Ryu's Wedding OST Pt. 1
"U&I" (유앤아이)	2021	All	The Haunted House: Ghost Ball Z - Dark Exorcist (season 4)
"One More Step" (한걸음 더)	2021	Miso	SomeAir (OST)
"Playlist"	2021	All	Your Playlist OST
"WANNA BE COOL"	2022	All	Girls in the Cage OST

=== Other singles ===
Song	Year	Member(s)	Album
"Faraway Hometown" (머나먼 고향)	2019	All	Immortal Songs: Singing the Legend: 100 Years of Korea, Singing with the People 2
"The song of the honeybee" (꿀벌의 노래) (Note: "The song of the honeybee" was released as part of the United Nations's Food and Agriculture Organization (FAO) campaign to raise awareness of importance of bees and urban beekeeping.)	2022	All	—N/a

== Videography ==
=== Music videos ===
Title	Year	Director
"Dream Note"	2018	Hong Won-Ki (Zanybros)
"Hakuna Matata" (하쿠나 마타타)	2019	David Amber
"Wish" (바라다)	2020	Unknown
"Ghost"	2021	Bobby Kwak
"Blue"	2023	Kim Ki-won
"Lemonade"	2023	Won Ji-ho
"Joyful Green" (Japanese Vs.)	2024	Kim Ki-won
"Joyful Green" (Korean Vs.)	2024	Kim Ki-won

== Awards and nominations ==
Name of the award ceremony, year presented, category, nominee of the award, and the result of the nomination
Award ceremony	Year	Category	Nominee / Work	Result	Ref.
Genie Music Awards	2019	The Top Artist	DreamNote	Nominated	
Genie Music Awards	2019	The Female New Artist	DreamNote	Nominated	
Genie Music Awards	2019	Genie Music Popularity Award	DreamNote	Nominated	
Genie Music Awards	2019	Global Popularity Award	DreamNote	Nominated	
