= 444 (disambiguation) =

444 is a year.

444 or variants may also refer to:

- 444 BC
- 444 (number)

== Transport ==
- British Rail Class 444, a British EMU train
- 4-4-4, a Whyte notation classification of steam locomotive
- Interstate 444, unsigned route in Oklahoma

== Film and television ==
- 4:44 Last Day on Earth, a 2011 American film
- The Haunted House: Room 444, a 2014 pilot Tooniverse animated television series

== Music ==
- 444 (album), 2000 album by Charlie Major
- 4:44 (album), 2017 album by Jay-Z
- "444", a song from electronic music group Autechre's debut album Incunabula
- "4 4 4", a song from ambient techno group The Fireman's debut album, Strawberries Oceans Ships Forest
- "444" is a song from the album 200 Tons Of Bad Luck by Crippled Black Phoenix
- triple4s.com

== Other uses ==
- .444 Marlin, rifle caliber
- 4:4:4 is chroma subsampling's "highest" quality level in digital video recording/encoding.
- 444 breathing
- 444 Angel number
