= The Haunted House: The Secret of the Cave =

2018 South Korean animated film

- Theatrical release poster
- 신비아파트: 금빛 도깨비와 비밀의 동굴
- Directed by: Kim Byung-gab
- Starring: Jo Hyeon-jeong; Kim Young-eun; Kim Chae-ha; Yang Jeong-hwa; Kim Yool; Shin Yong-woo
- Production companies: CJ ENM Co.; Studio BAZOOKA
- Distributed by: CJ ENM Co.
- Release date: 25 July 2018
- Running time: 68 minutes
- Country: South Korea
- Language: Korean
- Box office: $4,471,732 world wide

The Haunted House: The Secret of the Cave (Korean: 신비아파트: 금빛 도깨비와 비밀의 동굴) is a South Korean animated film directed by Kim Byung-gab. The film was released on July 25, 2018.

== Production ==
The film was succeeded by the next season of the part 2, The Haunted House: Birth of the Ghost Ball X, which premiered on November 8, 2018, on Tooniverse.

It was released on DVD in South Korea on April 3, 2019.

== Reception ==
The film grossed $4,471,732 in the box offices.

== See also ==
- South Korean animation
- Anime-influenced animation
