= The Haunted House season 1 =

First season of The Haunted House

The Haunted House
- Season 1 The Secret of the Ghost Ball
- Promotional poster
- No. of episodes: 24

Release
- Original network: Tooniverse
- Original release: July 20, 2016 – January 18, 2017

Season chronology
- Next → Season 2

The first season of The Haunted House animated television series, titled The Haunted House: The Secret of the Ghost Ball (신비아파트: 고스트볼의 비밀), was produced by STUDIO EEK and Cocktail Media. The season aired from July 20, 2016, to January 18, 2017, on Tooniverse in South Korea, every Wednesday at 8 p.m. KST. On December 1, 2018, the season was released on Netflix in the English dub version by Ocean Productions, later the series were released internationally on December 1, 2021. The series was removed in streaming on November 30 or December 1, 2024 (except South Korea), due to the low ratings.

This season contains two musical themes: "Ghost Ball" by Cho Min-wook is used as an opening theme and "Ma Friend" by Oh My Girl is used as an ending theme.

== Episodes ==
No. overall	No. in season	Title (Note: English translated titles are taken from Netflix.)	Original release date
1	1	"The Dreadful Descent of the Drowned Ghost!"; Transliteration: "Dol-aon sinbiapateu! Geom-eun mul sog-ui gongpo!" (Korean: 돌아온 신비아파트! 검은 물 속의 공포!)	July 20, 2016
2	2	"The Unbreakable Curse of the Girl's Hair!"; Transliteration: "Beos-eonal su eobsneun jeoju... sonyeoui meolikalag" (Korean: 벗어날 수 없는 저주... 소녀의 머리카락)	July 27, 2016
3	3	"The Terrifying Temptation of the Shadow Ghost"; Transliteration: "Yeppeojigo sipni? Geulimja gwisin-ui yuhog" (Korean: 예뻐지고 싶니? 그림자 귀신의 유혹)	August 3, 2016
4	4	"The Sinister Strike of the Spider Ghost!"; Transliteration: "Changbakk-ui bulgilhan siseon! Geomi gwisin-ui seubgyeog" (Korean: 창밖의 불길한 시선! 거미 귀신의 습격)	August 10, 2016
5	5	"The Enticing Entrapment of Ethra"; Transliteration: "Jeojubad-eun seumateupon" (Korean: 저주받은 스마트폰)	August 17, 2016
6	6	"The Nightmare of the No-Face Ghost"; Transliteration: "Jeongcheleul al su eobsneun jeog, eolgul eobsneun gwisin" (Korean: 정체를 알 수 없는 적, 얼굴 없는 귀신)	August 24, 2016
7	7	"The Mystery of the Marionette Queen"; Transliteration: "Bulgilhan mellodiui jeoju, ballelinaui oleugol" (Korean: 불길한 멜로디의 저주, 발레리나의 오르골)	August 31, 2016
8	8	"The Bewitched Bus!"; Transliteration: "Gongpoui 4444beon beoseu" (Korean: 공포의 4444번 버스)	September 7, 2016
9	9	"The Weird Tale of the Wicked Doll Ghost!"; Transliteration: "Ppajyeonagal su eobsneun hamjeong.. inganppobgi gigye" (Korean: 빠져나갈 수 없는 함정.. 인간뽑기 기계)	September 21, 2016
10	10	"Ian the Red-Eyed Boy"; Transliteration: "Bulg-eun nundongjaui sonyeon, ian" (Korean: 붉은 눈동자의 소년, 이안)	September 28, 2016
11	11	"The Mystifying and Malevolent Maze!"; Transliteration: "4wa 2bun-ui1, gwisin jido" (Korean: 4와 2분의1, 귀신 지도)	October 12, 2016
12	12	"The Hair-Raising Tale of the Homunculus!"; Transliteration: "Jag-eun ingan, homunkulluseu" (Korean: 작은 인간, 호문쿨루스)	October 19, 2016
13	13	"The Frightening Fable of the Flower of Death!"; Transliteration: "Jug-eum-eseo dol-aon kkoch" (Korean: 죽음에서 돌아온 꽃)	October 26, 2016
14	14	"The Spine-Chilling Story of the Skeleton Ghost!"; Transliteration: "Gongpoui sulyeonhoe, mudeom sog-ui aglyeong" (Korean: 공포의 수련회, 무덤 속의 악령)	November 2, 2016
15	15	"Invasion of the Iron Beast"; Transliteration: "Gangcheol jimseung-ui seubgyeog" (Korean: 강철 짐승의 습격)	November 9, 2016
16	16	"The Horrifying Game of Hide and Seek"; Transliteration: "Kkogkkog sum-eola, meolikalag boilla! Gwisingwaui sumbakkogjil!" (Korean: 꼭꼭 숨어라, 머리카락 보일라! 귀신과의 숨바꼭질!)	November 16, 2016
17	17	"The Malediction Malfunction"; Transliteration: "Geulim, lobos, geuligo puleunjeojuui yeonghon" (Korean: 그림, 로봇, 그리고 푸른저주의 영혼)	November 23, 2016
18	18	"The Spectral Sentinel"; Transliteration: "Eommaui wigi, kkeutnaji anhneun agmong!" (Korean: 엄마의 위기, 끝나지 않는 악몽!)	November 30, 2016
19	19	"The Vampire King"; Transliteration: "Baempaieoui wang" (Korean: 뱀파이어의 왕)	December 7, 2016
20	20	"Storm of the Straw Ghost"; Transliteration: "Bioneun nal-ui bangmunja, seom-eseo on gwisin" (Korean: 비오는 날의 방문자, 섬에서 온 귀신)	December 14, 2016
21	21	"A Dangerous Invite The Secret of the Wooden Mansion"; Transliteration: "Jihagugdaejeog-ui deungjang!" (Korean: 지하국대적의 등장!)	December 21, 2016
22	22	"The Rise of the Underground Nation"; Transliteration: "Angaesog-ui eummo, hayan nalgaeui goesu!" (Korean: 안개속의 음모, 하얀 날개의 괴수!)	January 4, 2017
23	23	"Shinbi Apartment – Doomsday (Part One)"; Transliteration: "Sinbiapateu, choehuui wigi (sang)" (Korean: 신비아파트, 최후의 위기 (상))	January 11, 2017
24	24	"Shinbi Apartment – Doomsday (Part Two)"; Transliteration: "Sinbiapateu, choehuui wigi (ha)" (Korean: 신비아파트, 최후의 위기 (하))	January 18, 2017

== Home media release ==
Volume	Date	Discs	Episodes	Reference
1	February 20, 2020	1	1–4	
2	May 15, 2020	1	5–8	
3	August 6, 2020	1	9–12	
4	November 9, 2020	1	13–16	
5	February 2, 2021	1	17–20	
6	March 4, 2021	1	21–24	

It is available on Netflix from 2017 to 2024.
