= Treasure Hunt (South Korean game show) =

- Promotional poster
- Also known as: Treasure Hunt; Treasure Finding; Finders Keepers
- 보물찾기
- Genre: Survival reality Game show
- Created by: Chae Sung-wook; Kim Eun-ji
- Written by: Kim Jung-sun
- Country of origin: South Korea
- Original language: Korean
- No. of seasons: 1
- No. of episodes: 8

Production
- Running time: 74–110 minutes

Original release
- Network: TVING
- Release: December 2, 2022 – January 20, 2023

Treasure Hunt (Korean: 보물찾기) is a South Korean survival reality game show that aired on the streaming platform TVING from its premiere on December 2, 2022 to January 20, 2023. Twenty-four contestants compete in a treasure hunt to find a ₩500 million (US$373,000) prize. New episodes aired every Friday at 4 PM.

== Cast ==
- Kang Han, a bobsledder training for the 2026 Winter Olympics
- Oh Hyun-min, a television personality and KAIST alumnus
- Yoon Soo-bin, a television host, forecaster, and analyst for League of Legends Champions Korea league
- Jang Ji-sou, a YouTuber and rapper
- Chambo / Chris Hambarsoomian, an Australian YouTuber living in South Korea
- Kim Stephany Hae-ry, a Brazilian-born Korean advertisement model, influencer, and TikTok personality

== Episodes ==
No.	Title	Original release date
1	"24"	December 2, 2022
2	"24"	December 9, 2022
3	"16"	December 16, 2022
4	"16"	December 23, 2922
5	"16"	December 30, 2022
6	"12"	January 6, 2023
7	"12"	January 13, 2023
8	"6"	January 20, 2023

== Production ==
Director Chae Sung-wook and screenwriter Kim Jung-sun compared the show to an experiment, where they observed how adults will behave in what is considered a childhood game. With monetary issues becoming more and more important, they wanted to observe how the participants' determination and attitude shined in a childhood survival game.

The show had a large realistic set, with built-in hidden mechanisms and levers to further develop an all-encompassing environment for the participants.
