= The Haunted House season 5 =

Fifth season of The Haunted House

The Haunted House
- Season 5 Ghost Ball ZERO
- Promotional poster
- No. of episodes: 26

Release
- Original network: Tooniverse
- Original release: March 30, 2023 – March 14, 2024

Season chronology
- ← Previous; Season 4

The fifth season of The Haunted House animated television series, titled The Haunted House: Ghost Ball ZERO (Korean: 신비아파트 고스트볼 ZERO), was produced by Studio BAZOOKA and STUDIO EEK. The first part of the season aired on Tooniverse in South Korea from March 30 to June 15, 2023, at 8 p.m. KST. The second part aired from November 30, 2023 to March 14, 2024.

It was announced that the season would be a special film recompilation as The Haunted House Special: Red Eyed Reaper (신비아파트 특별편: 붉은 눈의 사신) was released on August 14, 2024, exclusively theater on CGV.

The season was featured as a MapleStory, titled The Haunted House: Ghost Ball ZERO - Mystery Hunters (Korean: 신비아파트 고스트볼 ZERO - 미스터리 헌터스), which was released on March 24, 2023. The mobile video game of Time Zero (Korean: 타임제로) was released on March 25, 2023, on Android and iOS, published by 3F Factory.

This season contains two musical themes: "Got You" by Kep1er is used as an opening theme and "Dream Touch" by TO1 is used as a ending theme.

== Episodes ==
No. overall	No. in season	Title	Original release date
Part 1
98	1	"The ghost of the red origami crane, the earthworm" Transliteration: "Ppalgan jong-ihag-ui wonhon, jijeobgwi" (Korean: 빨간 종이학의 원혼, 지접귀)	March 30, 2023
99	2	"The Temptation of the Evil Violin, the String Demon"; Transliteration: "Saaghan baiollin-ui yuhog, hyeon-aggwi" (Korean: 사악한 바이올린의 유혹, 현악귀)	April 6, 2023
100	3	"Am I pretty? Red mask of fear" Transliteration: "Na yeppeo? Gongpoui ppalganmaseukeu" (Korean: 나 예뻐? 공포의 빨간마스크)	April 13, 2023
101	4	"The King of Bugs, Chunghogwi's Attack"; Transliteration: "Beolledeul-ui wang, chunghogwiui seubgyeog" (Korean: 벌레들의 왕, 충호귀의 습격)	April 20, 2023
102	5	"Budding cries, the root monster's truth" Transliteration: "Ssagteuneun ul-eumsoli, ppuli goesuui jinsil" (Korean: 싹트는 울음소리, 뿌리 괴수의 진실)	April 27, 2023
103	6	"Escape from the dangerous invitation, horror game!" Transliteration: "Wiheomhan chodae, gongpo geim-eseo talchulhala!" (Korean: 위험한 초대, 공포 게임에서 탈출하라!)	May 11, 2023 (Note: These episodes were delayed, both Episode 6 on May 4, 2023 and 22 on February 8, 2024 on Tooniverse before they aired on The Haunted House: The Dimensional Goblin and the Seven Worlds on May 4, 2023 and February 8, 2024.)
104	7	"The curse of the confined well, the legend of the slime monster" Transliteration: "Han maejhin umul-ui jeoju, jeom-aeg goemul-ui jeonseol" (Korean: 한 맺힌 우물의 저주, 점액 괴물의 전설)	May 18, 2023
105	8	"False Love's Oath, Fallen Cupid's Temptation"; Transliteration: "Geojisdoen salang-ui maengse, talag kyupideuui yuhog" (Korean: 거짓된 사랑의 맹세, 타락 큐피드의 유혹)	May 25, 2023
106	9	"The suspicious secret of the construction site" Transliteration: "Gongsajang-ui susanghan bimil" (Korean: 공사장의 수상한 비밀)	June 1, 2023
107	10	"Attack of the Red Sand Storm, Shinbi Apartment in Crisis (Part 1)"; Transliteration: "Bulg-eun molae pogpung-ui seubgyeog, wigiui sinbiapateu (sang)" (Korean: 붉은 모래 폭풍의 습격, 위기의 신비아파트 (상))	June 8, 2023
108	11	"Attack of the Red Sand Storm, Shinbi Apartment in Crisis (Part 2)"; Transliteration: "Bulg-eun molae pogpung-ui seubgyeog, wigiui sinbiapateu (ha)" (Korean: 붉은 모래 폭풍의 습격, 위기의 신비아파트 (하))	June 15, 2023
Part 2
109	12	"Has the ghost come? Forbidden Spell, Bunshinsaba"; Transliteration: "Gwisinnim osyeossseubnikka? Geumjidoen jumun, bunsinsaba" (Korean: 귀신님 오셨습니까? 금지된 주문, 분신사바)	November 30, 2023
110	13	"Sweet addiction, secrets of disappeared children" Transliteration: "Dalkomhan jungdog, salajin aideul-ui bimil" (Korean: 달콤한 중독, 사라진 아이들의 비밀)	December 7, 2023
111	14	"Cruel Laughter, Smile Challenge"; Transliteration: "Janhoghan Us-eum, Seumail Chaellinji" (Korean: 잔혹한 웃음, 스마일 챌린지)	December 14, 2023
112	15	"Library of Fear, The Truth Behind Ghost Stories on the 4th Floor"; Transliteration: "Gongpoui Doseogwan, 4cheung Goedam-ui Jinsil" (Korean: 공포의 도서관, 4층 괴담의 진실)	December 21, 2023
113	16	"Family Trip in Crisis, Spooky Ghost Camping Site"; Transliteration: "Wigiui Gajog-yeohaeng, Ossaghan Gwisin Kaempingjang" (Korean: 위기의 가족여행, 오싹한 귀신 캠핑장)	December 28, 2023
114	17	"Fight with your Soul! Soccer Match with Ghosts"; Transliteration: "Yeonghon-eul Geolgo Ssawola! Gwisingwaui Chuggu Daegyeol" (Korean: 영혼을 걸고 싸워라! 귀신과의 축구 대결)	January 4, 2024
115	18	"Unidentified Flying Object, Chase the UFO!"; Transliteration: "Mihwag-in Bihaengmulche, UFOleul Chugyeoghala!" (Korean: 미확인 비행물체, UFO를 추격하라!)	January 11, 2024
116	19	"The Black Monster in the Apartment, The Mystery of Polluted Water"; Transliteration: "Apateuui Geom-eun Goesu, Oyeomdoen Mul-ui Miseuteoli" (Korean: 아파트의 검은 괴수, 오염된 물의 미스터리)	January 18, 2024
117	20	"Forbidden Forest and Nightmare Trap"; Transliteration: "Geumjidoen Supgwa agmong-ui Deoch" (Korean: 금지된 숲과 악몽의 덫)	January 25, 2024
118	21	"Hungry Soul Hunter, Fearful Ghost Tiger"; Transliteration: "Gulmjulin Yeonghon Sanyangkkun, Gongpoui Gwisin Holang-i" (Korean: 굶주린 영혼 사냥꾼, 공포의 귀신 호랑이)	February 1, 2024
119	22	"Eternal Snowstorm, Escape from the Frozen Ski Resort"; Transliteration: "Yeong-wonhan Nunbola, Eol-eobut-eun Seukijang-eseo Talchulhala" (Korean: 영원한 눈보라, 얼어붙은 스키장에서 탈출하라)	February 15, 2024
120	23	"Do You Want It? The Temptation of the Forbidden Gift"; Transliteration: "Gajgo Sipni? Geumjidoen Seonmul-ui Yuhog" (Korean: 갖고 싶니? 금지된 선물의 유혹)	February 22, 2024
121	24	"Curse of Lies, The Truth About Pinocchio"; Transliteration: "Geojismal-ui Jeoju, Pinokioui Jinsil" (Korean: 거짓말의 저주, 피노키오의 진실)	February 29, 2024
122	25	"The Second Coming of the Red Moon, Lamia, The Reaper of Disease (Part 1)"; Transliteration: "Bulg-eun Dal-ui Jaelim, Jilbyeong-ui Sasin Lamia(sang)" (Korean: 붉은 달의 재림, 질병의 사신 라미아(상))	March 7, 2024
123	26	"The Second Coming of the Red Moon, Lamia, The Reaper of Disease (Part 2)"; Transliteration: "Bulg-eun Dal-ui Jaelim, Jilbyeong-ui Sasin Lamia(ha)" (Korean: 붉은 달의 재림, 질병의 사신 라미아(하))	March 14, 2024

== Home media release ==
Volume		Date	Discs	Episodes	Reference
Part 1	1	December 6, 2024	1	98–101	
Part 1	2	February 19, 2025	1	102–105	
Part 1	3	March 14, 2025	1	106–108	
Part 2	4	April 15, 2025	1	109–112	
Part 2	5	May 20, 2025	1	113–116	
Part 2	6	June 13, 2025	1	117–120	
Part 2	7	July 16, 2025	1	121–123	
