= The Haunted House season 2 =

Second season of The Haunted House

The Haunted House
- Season 2 Birth of Ghost Ball X
- Promotional poster
- No. of episodes: 23

Release
- Original network: Tooniverse
- Original release: November 9, 2017 – January 24, 2019

Season chronology
- ← Previous; Season 1 Next → Season 3

The second season of The Haunted House animated television series, titled The Haunted House: Birth of Ghost Ball X (신비아파트: 고스트볼X의 탄생), was produced by STUDIO EEK and Cocktail Media. The first part of the season aired on 13 episodes, from November 9, 2017, to March 15, 2018, on Tooniverse in South Korea at 8 p.m. KST. The second part aired the 10 episodes, from November 8, 2018, to January 24, 2019. Geumbi appeared in the Part 2 before she first appeared in the first film, The Haunted House: The Secret of the Cave.

This season contains two musical themes: "No Control" by ONF is used as an opening theme and "Fly Away" by Lee Jin-ah is used as an ending theme.

== Episodes ==
No. overall	No. in season	Title (Note: English translated titles are taken from Netflix.)	Original release date	Viewership rating
Part 1
25	1	"The New Threat of The Haunted House! Gaze Through the Open Door"; Transliteration: "Yeeon-ui sijag, geom-eun sasin-ui molaebalam" (Korean: 신비아파트, 새로운 위기 문틈속의 시선)	November 9, 2017	N/A
26	2	"Listen to My Song The Cursed Voice"; Transliteration: "Nae nolaeleul deul-eojwo, Jeojuui mogsoli" (Korean: "내 노래를 들어줘." 저주의 목소리)	November 16, 2017	N/A
27	3	"An Unkept Promise The Attack of the Living Doll"; Transliteration: "Jikiji moshan yagsog, sal-aissneun inhyeong-ui seubgyeog" (Korean: 지키지 못한 약속, 살아있는 인형의 습격)	November 23, 2017	N/A
28	4	"The Cursed Hospital The Nurse with Red Tears"; Transliteration: "Jeojue geollin byeong-won, bulg-eun nunmul-ui ganhosa" (Korean: 저주에 걸린 병원, 붉은 눈물의 간호사)	November 30, 2017	N/A
29	5	"Invitation to the Nightmare The Visitor in the Dream"; Transliteration: "Agmong-euloui chodae, kkumsog-ui bangmunja" (Korean: 악몽으로의 초대, 꿈속의 방문자)	January 4, 2018	N/A
30	6	"The Legendary Enemy The Shadow of the Ancient Monster"; Transliteration: "Jeonseol sog-ui jeog, godae goesuui geulimja" (Korean: 전설 속의 적, 고대 괴수의 그림자)	January 11, 2018	N/A
31	7	"I'll Find You The Game Show of Fear"; Transliteration: "Neol chaj-agalge! Gongpoui geimbangsong" (Korean: "널 찾아갈게!" 공포의 게임방송)	January 18, 2018	N/A
32	8	"Angry Ghost Trapped in a Picture The Legend of Slender Man"; Transliteration: "Sajinsog-e gadhin wonhon, seullendeomaen-ui jeonseol" (Korean: 사진속에 갇힌 원혼, 슬렌더맨의 전설)	January 25, 2018	10.0%
33	9	"Carnival of Greed Reune Apartment"; Transliteration: "Tam-yog-ui kanibal, leune apateu" (Korean: 탐욕의 카니발, 르네 아파트)	February 1, 2018	N/A
34	10	"The Cursed Night Retreat of Fear"; Transliteration: "Jeojunaelin bam, gongpoui sulyeonhoe" (Korean: 저주내린 밤, 공포의 수련회)	February 8, 2018	N/A
35	11	"Forbidden Invitation The Clown of Madness"; Transliteration: "Geumjidoen chodaejang, gwang-giui pielo" (Korean: 금지된 초대장, 광기의 피에로)	March 1, 2018	N/A
36	12	"The Demon Behind the Mask Ghost Ball in Crisis (Part 1)"; Transliteration: "Gamyeonsog-ui agma, wigiui goseuteubol (sangpyeon)" (Korean: 가면속의 악마, 위기의 고스트볼 (상편))	March 8, 2018	N/A
37	13	"The Demon Behind the Mask Ghost Ball in Crisis (Part 2)"; Transliteration: "Gamyeonsog-ui agma, wigiui goseuteubol (hapyeon)" (Korean: 가면속의 악마, 위기의 고스트볼 (하편))	March 15, 2018	N/A
Part 2
38	14	"The Ghost's Shoes and the Disappeared Children"; Transliteration: "Gwisin sinbalgwa salajin aideul" (Korean: 귀신 신발과 사라진 아이들)	November 8, 2018	N/A
39	15	"Unstoppable Temptation Raging Predator"; Transliteration: "Meomchul su eobsneun yuhog, bunnoui posigja" (Korean: 멈출 수 없는 유혹, 분노의 포식자)	November 15, 2018	N/A
40	16	"Inevitable Fear Soulless Pursuer"; Transliteration: "Pihal su eobsneun gongpo, yeonghon eobsneun chugyeogja" (Korean: 피할 수 없는 공포, 영혼 없는 추격자)	November 22, 2018	N/A
41	17	"The Dark Spreading Sound Forbidden Whisper"; Transliteration: "Peojyeonaganeun geom-eun soli, geumjidoen sogsag-im" (Korean: 퍼져나가는 검은 소리, 금지된 속삭임)	November 29, 2018	N/A
42	18	"Reawakened Bloody Fear Temptation of the Dark Night"; Transliteration: "Dasi kkaeeonan pisbich gongpo, geom-eunbam-ui yuhog" (Korean: 다시 깨어난 핏빛 공포, 검은밤의 유혹)	December 6, 2018	N/A
43	19	"Inescapable Fear The Scent of the Ashen Demon"; Transliteration: "Ppulichil su eobsneun gongpo, jaesbich agmaui hyang-gi" (Korean: 뿌리칠 수 없는 공포, 잿빛 악마의 향기)	December 13, 2018	N/A
44	20	"Soul Searching Nine-Tail A Thousand-Year Wait"; Transliteration: "Yeonghon-eul chajneun ahob gaeui kkoli, cheonnyeon-ui gidalim" (Korean: 영혼을 찾는 아홉 개의 꼬리, 천년의 기다림)	January 3, 2019	N/A
45	21	"A Dangerous Invite The Secret of the Wooden Mansion"; Transliteration: "Wiheomhan chodae, mogjojeotaeg-ui bimil" (Korean: 위험한 초대, 목조저택의 비밀)	January 10, 2019	7.269%
46	22	"The Beginning of Disaster Undying Flame"; Transliteration: "Jaeang-ui sijag, kkeojiji anhneun bulkkoch" (Korean: 재앙의 시작, 꺼지지 않는 불꽃)	January 17, 2019	47.1%
47	23	"Judgement Day The Truth of the Goblin Cave"; Transliteration: "Simpan-ui nal, dokkaebi dong-gul-ui jinsil" (Korean: 심판의 날, 도깨비 동굴의 진실)	January 24, 2019	4.341%

== Home media release ==
Volume		Date	Discs	Episodes	Reference
Part 1	1	June 11, 2021	1	25–27	
Part 1	2	July 9, 2021	1	28–30	
Part 1	3	August 6, 2021	1	31–33	
Part 1	4	June 10, 2021	1	34–37	
Part 2	1	October 6, 2021	1	38–40	
Part 2	2	November 9, 2021	1	41–43	
Part 2	3	December 3, 2021	1	44–47	
