= The Haunted House: The Sky Goblin vs Jormungandr =

2019 South Korean animated film

The Haunted House: The Sky Goblin VS Jormungandr
- Theatrical release poster
- 극장판 신비아파트: 하늘도깨비 대 요르문간드
- Directed by: Byeon Young-Kyu
- Starring: Jo Hyeon-jeong; Jeonghwa Yang; Hyunji Kim; Youngeun Kim; Chaeha kim; Yong Woo Shin,
- Production companies: CJ ENM Co.; Studio BAZOOKA
- Distributed by: CJ ENM Co.
- Release date: 19 December 2019
- Running time: 97 minutes
- Country: South Korea
- Language: Korean
- Box office: $5,705,509 world wide

The Haunted House: The Sky Goblin VS Jormungandr (Korean: 극장판 신비아파트: 하늘도깨비 대 요르문간드) is a South Korean animated film directed by Byeon Young-Kyu.

== Synopsis ==
A team of paranormal investigators are hired to investigate a haunted house that is rumored to be inhabited by a malevolent spirit known as Jormungandr. The team is led by the charismatic and fearless Sky Goblin, who has a reputation for taking on even the most dangerous cases. As the team begins their investigation, they soon realize that Jormungandr is far more powerful than they ever anticipated. The malevolent spirit possesses the bodies of several members of the team, turning them into its willing servants. Sky Goblin and the remaining team members must use all their skills and knowledge to stop Jormungandr and free their possessed colleagues.

== See also ==
- South Korean animation
- Anime-influenced animation
