= The Haunted House season 3 =

Third season of The Haunted House

The Haunted House
- Season 3 Ghost Ball Double X
- Promotional poster
- No. of episodes: 26

Release
- Original network: Tooniverse
- Original release: March 5, 2020 – January 21, 2021

Season chronology
- ← Previous; Season 2 Next → Season 4

The third season of The Haunted House animated television series, titled The Haunted House: Ghost Ball Double X (신비아파트 고스트볼 더블X), was produced by STUDIO EEK and Cocktail Media. The first part titled The Haunted House: Ghost Ball Double X: The 6 Prophiecies (신비아파트 고스트볼 더블X : 6개의 예언) aired on Tooniverse in South Korea from March 5 to June 4, 2020, at 8 p.m. KST. The second part is titled The Haunted House: Ghost Ball Double X: Suspicious Request (신비아파트 고스트볼 더블X : 수상한 의뢰), which aired from October 8, 2020, to January 21, 2021.

The mobile RPG video game of The Haunted House: Soul Fighters (신비아파트: 소울파이터즈) was released on April 7, 2020, on Android, published by Move Interactive. The mobile video game of Archer Kang-lim (궁수강림: 6개의 예언) was released on May 5, 2020, on Android and iOS, published by 3F Factory.

This season contains three musical themes: "Highter" by Toola is used as an opening theme and "Promise" by Lovelyz is used as an ending theme. The second ending theme was used as a "Shinbi Song" by SinB in Part 2.

== Episodes ==
No. overall	No. in season	Title	Original release date	Viewership rating
Part 1: The 6 Prophecies (Note: 6gaeui yeeon (6개의 예언))
48	1	"The beginning of the prophecy, the sandstorm of the Black Reaper"; Transliteration: "Yeeon-ui sijag, geom-eun sasin-ui molaebalam" (Korean: 예언의 시작, 검은 사신의 모래바람)	March 5, 2020	8.44%
49	2	"Cries wandering through the alleys, cat ghosts attack!" Transliteration: "Golmog-eul tteodoneun ul-eumsoli, goyang-i gwisin-ui seubgyeog!" (Korean: 골목을 떠도는 울음소리, 고양이 귀신의 습격!)	March 12, 2020	10.72%
50	3	"The Black Rake of Fear, children trapped in the sewers" Transliteration: "Gongpoui geom-eun galkwi, hasugue gadhin aideul" (Korean: 공포의 검은 갈퀴, 하수구에 갇힌 아이들)	March 19, 2020	N/A
51	4	"Curse of Red Poison, Legend of the Angry God of Calamity"; Transliteration: "Bulg-eun dog-ui jeoju, bunnohan jaeangsin-ui jeonseol" (Korean: 붉은 독의 저주, 분노한 재앙신의 전설)	March 26, 2020	N/A
52	5	"Children in danger, traps in the haunted forest" Transliteration: "Wigie cheohan aideul, gwisin sup-ui hamjeong" (Korean: 위기에 처한 아이들, 귀신 숲의 함정)	April 2, 2020	N/A
53	6	"Want to be you! temptation of the little devil" Transliteration: "Nega doego sip-eo! jag-eun agmaui yuhog" (Korean: 네가 되고 싶어! 작은 악마의 유혹)	April 9, 2020	N/A
54	7	"The scream of sloth hell, the whistle of terror" Transliteration: "Natae jiog-ui bimyeong, gongpoui hwipalam soli" (Korean: 나태 지옥의 비명, 공포의 휘파람 소리)	April 16, 2020	N/A
55	8	"The prophecy started again, red eyes in the ground" Transliteration: "Dasi sijagdoen yeeon, ttang sog-ui bulg-eun nun" (Korean: 검다시 시작된 예언, 땅 속의 붉은 눈)	April 23, 2020	N/A
56	9	"A huge shadow, fear of the ice monster!" Transliteration: "Geodaehan geulimja, eol-eumgoesuui gongpo!" (Korean: 거대한 그림자, 얼음괴수의 공포!)	May 7, 2020	N/A
57	10	"Memories of a Past Life, The Alchemist and the Golden Bat"; Transliteration: "Jeonsaeng-ui gieog, yeongeumsulsawa hwang-geumbagjwi" (Korean: 전생의 기억, 연금술사와 황금박쥐)	May 14, 2020	8.04%
58	11	"The Screaming Garden of Horror, the Mascot Became a Devil"; Transliteration: "Gongpoui bimyeongdongsan, agmaga doen maseukoteu" (Korean: 공포의 비명동산, 악마가 된 마스코트)	May 21, 2020	N/A
59	12	"A child who sees ghosts, the menace of red eyes" Transliteration: "Gwisin boneun ai, bulg-eun siseon-ui wihyeob" (Korean: 귀신 보는 아이, 붉은 시선의 위협)	May 28, 2020	N/A
60	13	"Last Prophecy, Soulless Enforcer"; Transliteration: "Choehuui yeeon, yeonghon eobsneun jibhaengja" (Korean: 최후의 예언, 영혼 없는 집행자)	June 4, 2020	10.20%
Part 2: Suspicious Request (Note: Susanghan Uiloe (수상한 의뢰))
61	14	"The white-voiced beast, hide-and-seek of fear" Transliteration: "Hayan mogsoliui yasu, gongpoui sumbakkogjil" (Korean: 하얀 목소리의 야수, 공포의 숨바꼭질)	October 8, 2020	N/A
62	15	"Memories of Sad Resentment, Trap of the Purple Woman"; Transliteration: "Seulpeun wonhan-ui gieog, bolasbich yeoin-ui deoch" (Korean: 슬픈 원한의 기억, 보랏빛 여인의 덫)	October 15, 2020	N/A
63	16	"Black mud, the mystery of a village in the rain" Transliteration: "Geom-eun jinheulg, bi naelineun ma-eul-ui miseuteoli" (Korean: 검은 진흙, 비 내리는 마을의 미스터리)	October 22, 2020	N/A
64	17	"An ancient curse awakened, the attack of the Jiangshi"; Transliteration: "Kkaeeonan godaeui jeoju, gangsiui seubgyeog" (Korean: 깨어난 고대의 저주, 강시의 습격)	October 29, 2020	N/A
65	18	"A flower blooming in a shady room, an occupied apartment" Transliteration: "Geuneuljin bang-eseo pieonan kkoch, jeomlyeongdanghan apateu" (Korean: 그늘진 방에서 피어난 꽃, 점령당한 아파트)	November 12, 2020	N/A
66	19	"The first story of the vampire zombie Chupacabra"; Transliteration: "Heubhyeoljombi chupakabeula cheosbeonjjae iyagi" (Korean: 흡혈좀비 추파카브라 첫번째 이야기)	November 19, 2020	N/A
67	20	"The first story of the vampire zombie Chupacabra"; Transliteration: "Heubhyeoljombi chupakabeula cheosbeonjjae iyagi" (Korean: 흡혈좀비 추파카브라 두번째 이야기)	November 26, 2020	N/A
68	21	"Black smiles in paintings, people who disappeared" Transliteration: "Geulim sog-ui geom-eun miso, salajin salamdeul" (Korean: 그림 속의 검은 미소, 사라진 사람들)	December 3, 2020	N/A
69	22	"A song of sad memories, a red voice approaching" Transliteration: "Seulpeun gieog-ui nolae, dagaoneun bulg-eun mogsoli" (Korean: 슬픈 기억의 노래, 다가오는 붉은 목소리)	December 10, 2020	N/A
70	23	"Twisted desire, the temptation of the mask" Transliteration: "Dwiteullin yogmang, gamyeon-ui yuhog" (Korean: 뒤틀린 욕망, 가면의 유혹)	December 17, 2020	N/A
71	24	"Ugly Beauty's Eyes, Medusa"; Transliteration: "Chuaghan minyeoui nunbich, medusa" (Korean: 추악한 미녀의 눈빛, 메두사)	January 7, 2021	N/A
72	25	"The gaze in the dark, the fear of a school with no lights" Transliteration: "Eodum sog-ui siseon, bul kkeojin haggyoui gongpo" (Korean: 어둠 속의 시선, 불 꺼진 학교의 공포)	January 14, 2021	N/A
73	26	"The secret of Byeolbit Elementary School, the resurrection of Satoryong"; Transliteration: "Byeolbichchodeunghaggyoui bimil, satolyong-ui buhwal" (Korean: 별빛초등학교의 비밀, 사토룡의 부활)	January 21, 2021	N/A

== Home media release ==
Volume		Date	Discs	Episodes	Reference
The 6 Prophecies	1	March 10, 2022	1	48–50	
The 6 Prophecies	2	April 12, 2022	1	51–53	
The 6 Prophecies	3	May 10, 2022	1	54–56	
The 6 Prophecies	4	June 10, 2022	1	57–60	
Suspicious Request	1	July 12, 2022	1	61–63	
Suspicious Request	2	August 11, 2022	1	64–66	
Suspicious Request	3	September 16, 2022	1	67–69	
Suspicious Request	4	October 13, 2022	1	70–73	
