= The Haunted House season 4 =

Fourth season of The Haunted House

The Haunted House
- Season 4 Ghost Ball Z
- Promotional poster. From left to right: Sara, Guido Hyun, Leon Raymond, Doori Koo, Geumbi, Shinbi, Hari Koo, Jubi, Hyun-woo Kim, Kang-lim Choi, Gaeun Lee, Ian
- No. of episodes: 24

Release
- Original network: Tooniverse
- Original release: September 16, 2021 – July 28, 2022

Season chronology
- ← Previous; Season 3 Next → Season 5

The fourth season of The Haunted House animated television series, titled The Haunted House: Ghost Ball Z (신비아파트 고스트볼Z), was produced by Studio BAZOOKA and STUDIO EEK. The first part titled The Haunted House: Ghost Ball Z: The Dark Exorcist (신비아파트 고스트볼Z: 어둠의 퇴마사) aired on Tooniverse in South Korea from September 16 to December 16, 2021, at 8 p.m. KST. The second part is titled The Haunted House: Ghost Ball Z: Guido Exorcist (신비아파트 고스트볼Z : 귀도퇴마사), which aired from April 28 to July 28, 2022.

This season contains two musical themes: "Time of Destiny" by Yoon Do-hyun is used as an opening theme and "U&I" by DreamNote is used as an ending theme.

== Episodes ==
No. overall	No. in season	Title	Original release date	Viewership rating
Part 1: The Dark Exorcist (Note: Eodum-ui Toemasa (어둠의 퇴마사))
74	1	"The temptation beyond the window, the whisper of a huge shadow" Transliteration: "Changmun neomeoui yuhog, geodaehan geulimjaui sogsag-im" (Korean: 창문 너머의 유혹, 거대한 그림자의 속삭임)	September 16, 2021	4.86%
75	2	"The Beginning of a Clear Nightmare, Cursed Glasses"; Transliteration: "Seonmyeonghan agmong-ui sijag, Jeojubad-eun angyeong" (Korean: 선명한 악몽의 시작, 저주받은 안경)	September 23, 2021	N/A
76	3	"Fear of the bathroom, never-ending hide-and-seek" Transliteration: "Hwajangsil-ui gongpo, kkeutnaji anhneun sumbakkogjil" (Korean: 화장실의 공포, 끝나지 않는 숨바꼭질)	September 30, 2021	N/A
77	4	"Say your wish, the curse of suspicious chat" Transliteration: "Sowon-eul malhaebwa, susanghan chaeting-ui jeoju" (Korean: 소원을 말해봐, 수상한 채팅의 저주)	October 7, 2021	N/A
78	5	"Inescapable hell, cursed bells" Transliteration: "Domangchil su eobsneun jiog, jeojuui jongsoli" (Korean: 도망칠 수 없는 지옥, 저주의 종소리)	October 21, 2021	N/A
79	6	"The invisible hand, a puppet show of horror" Transliteration: "Boiji anhneun son, gongpoui inhyeong-geug" (Korean: 보이지 않는 손, 공포의 인형극)	October 28, 2021	N/A
80	7	"A sad cry, a nightmare on the road" Transliteration: "Seogeulpeun ul-eumsoli, dolo wiui agmong" (Korean: 서글픈 울음소리, 도로 위의 악몽)	November 4, 2021	50.2%
81	8	"The Secret of the Black Forest, Memories of Despair"; Transliteration: "Geom-eun sup-ui bimil, Dasi mannan jeolmang-ui gieog" (Korean: 검은 숲의 비밀, 다시 만난 절망의 기억)	November 11, 2021	N/A
82	9	"House of horror, trap from which there is no escape" Transliteration: "Gongpoui jib, ppajyeo naol su eobsneun hamjeong" (Korean: 공포의 집, 빠져 나올 수 없는 함정)	November 25, 2021	N/A
83	10	"Dangerous festival, flame inside a blazing mask" Transliteration: "Wiheomhan chugje, igeulgeolineun gamyeon sog bulkkoch" (Korean: 위험한 축제, 이글거리는 가면 속 불꽃)	December 2, 2021	N/A
84	11	"Those who can't close their eyes, the tragedy of an infected city (Part 1)"; Transliteration: "Nun gamji mos haneun jadeul, gam-yeomdoen dosiui bigeug (sang)" (Korean: 붉은 모래 폭풍의 습격, 위기의 신비아파트 (하))	December 9, 2021	N/A
85	12	"Those who can't close their eyes, the tragedy of an infected city (Part 2)"; Transliteration: "Nun gamji mos haneun jadeul, gam-yeomdoen dosiui bigeug (ha)" (Korean: 눈 감지 못 하는 자들, 감염된 도시의 비극 (하))	December 16, 2021	N/A
Part 2: Guido Exorcist (Note: Gwidotoemasa (귀도퇴마사))
86	13	"Private broadcast of horror, the secret of the black house" Transliteration: "Gongpoui gaein bangsong, geom-eun jib-ui bimil" (Korean: 공포의 개인 방송, 검은 집의 비밀)	April 28, 2022	4.9%
87	14	"A huge shadow, the scream of a beast that couldn't leave" Transliteration: "Geodaehan geulimja, tteonaji moshan maengsuui jeolgyu" (Korean: 거대한 그림자, 떠나지 못한 맹수의 절규)	May 5, 2022	N/A
88	15	"You can't cry, a voice that chases away tears" Transliteration: "Ulmyeon an dwae, nunmul-eul jjochneun mogsoli" (Korean: 울면 안 돼, 눈물을 쫓는 목소리)	May 12, 2022	N/A
89	16	"Shh, inaudible scream" Transliteration: "Swis, deulliji anhneun bimyeong" (Korean: 쉿, 들리지 않는 비명)	May 19, 2022	N/A
90	17	"The me who was taken away, another attack of me" Transliteration: "Ppaeasgyeobeolin na, tto daleun naui seubgyeog" (Korean: 빼앗겨버린 나, 또 다른 나의 습격)	May 26, 2022	N/A
91	18	"The secret revealed in the moonlight, the demon's roar resurrected" Transliteration: "Dalbich-e deuleonan bimil, doesal-anan agmaui pohyo" (Korean: 달빛에 드러난 비밀, 되살아난 악마의 포효)	June 9, 2022	N/A
92	19	"The stolen soul, the truth that rises to the surface (Part 1)"; Transliteration: "Ppaeasgin yeonghon, sumyeon wilo tteooleun jinsil (sang)" (Korean: 빼앗긴 영혼, 수면 위로 떠오른 진실 (상))	June 16, 2022	N/A
93	20	"The stolen soul, the truth that rises to the surface (Part 2)"; Transliteration: "Ppaeasgin yeonghon, sumyeon wilo tteooleun jinsil (ha)" (Korean: 빼앗긴 영혼, 수면 위로 떠오른 진실 (하))	June 23, 2022	N/A
94	21	"The flames of anger, the substance of scorched memories" Transliteration: "Bunnoui hwayeom, geueullin gieog-ui silche" (Korean: 분노의 화염, 그을린 기억의 실체)	June 30, 2022	N/A
95	22	"Fear never stops, the train to hell" Transliteration: "Meomchuji anhneun gongpo, jiog-eulo hyanghaneun yeolcha" (Korean: 멈추지 않는 공포, 지옥으로 향하는 열차)	July 14, 2022	N/A
96	23	"A broken seal, a tragedy hidden in the shadows (Part 1)"; Transliteration: "Kkaejyeobeolin bong-in, geuneul-e galyeojin bigeug (sang)" (Korean: 깨져버린 봉인, 그늘에 가려진 비극 (상))	July 21, 2022	N/A
97	24	"A broken seal, a tragedy hidden in the shadows (Part 2)"; Transliteration: "Kkaejyeobeolin bong-in, geuneul-e galyeojin bigeug (ha)" (Korean: 깨져버린 봉인, 그늘에 가려진 비극 (하))	July 28, 2022	N/A

== Home media release ==
Volume		Date	Discs	Episodes	Reference
The Dark Exorcist	1	July 12, 2023	1	74–76	
The Dark Exorcist	2	August 8, 2023	1	77–79	
The Dark Exorcist	3	September 19, 2023	1	80–82	
The Dark Exorcist	4	October 13, 2023	1	83–85	
Guido Exorcist	1	November 15, 2023	1	86–88	
Guido Exorcist	2	January 19, 2024	1	89–91	
Guido Exorcist	3	February 20, 2024	1	92–94	
Guido Exorcist	4	March 12, 2024	1	95–97	
