= Cho Hyun-jung =

Korean voice actress

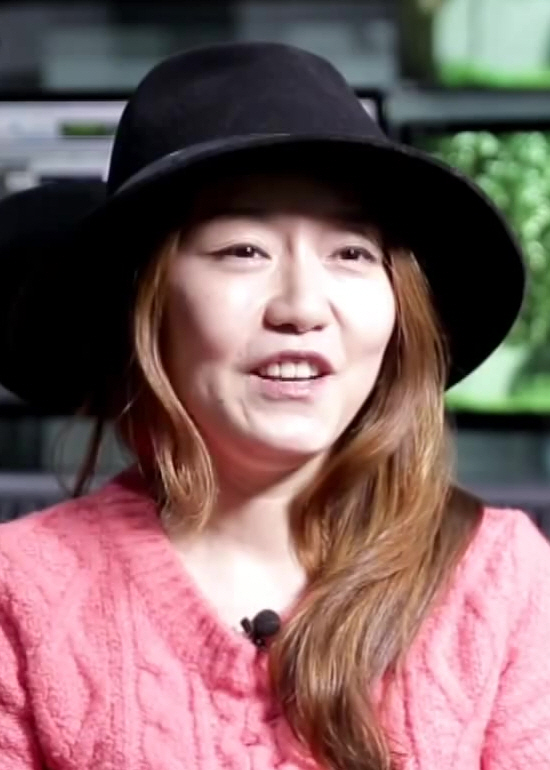
- Cho in 2015

Korean name
- Hangul: 조현정
- RR: Jo Hyeonjeong
- MR: Cho Hyŏnjŏng

Cho Hyun-jung (Korean: 조현정) is a South Korean voice actress who joined Munhwa Broadcasting Corporation's voice acting division in 2002 and she also known as Shinbi from South Korea's animated series The Haunted House.

== Roles ==
=== Broadcast TV ===
- The Haunted House - Shinbi
- The Witcher (Korea TV Edition, Netflix) - Tissaia de Vries, Voleth Meir
- Futari wa Pretty Cure (Korea TV Edition, SBS)
- Ojamajo Doremi (Magical Remi from 2nd - 3rd Series, Korea TV Edition, MBC)
- Jimmy Neutron (Korea TV Edition, MBC)
- 24 (extra guest and replacing Laura Harris by Season 2, Korea TV Edition, MBC)
- CSI: Crime Scene Investigation (extra guest, Korea TV Edition, MBC)
- CSI: Miami (extra guest, Korea TV Edition, MBC)
- The Powerpuff Girls (Korea TV Edition, Cartoon Network) - Ms. Keane, Sedusa, Boomer, Robin Snyder
- The Amazing World of Gumball (Korea TV Edition, Cartoon Network) - Gumball Christopher Watterson
- My Little Pony: Friendship Is Magic (Korea TV Edition, Tooniverse) - Rainbow Dash
- Sonic Boom (Korea TV Edition, Cartoon Network) - Miles "Tails" Prower

=== Film dubbing ===
- Six Days, Seven Nights (replacing Jacqueline Obradors, Korea TV Edition, MBC)
- The Haunted House: The Sky Goblin VS Jormungandr - Shinbi

=== Video games ===
- Cookie Run: Kingdom - Mala Sauce Cookie
- Diablo III (Korea Edition) - Wizard (female)
- Genshin Impact - Aloy
- League of Legends (Korea Edition) - Irelia, Riven, Quinn
- MapleStory - Cadena, Shade (female, old voice), Edea (The Holy City of Cernium), Avril, Hinya, Rino, Johanna
- Overwatch (Korea Edition) - Pharah
- The Witcher 3: Wild Hunt - Cirilla Fiona Elen Riannon

== See also ==
- Munhwa Broadcasting Corporation
- MBC Voice Acting Division
- Tooniverse

== Homepage ==
- MBC Voice Acting division Cho Hyun-jung blog (in Korean)
