= Tooniverse =

South Korean cable and satellite television channel

Toon!verse
- Logo used since March 1, 2019
- Country: South Korea
- Broadcast area: Nationwide
- Headquarters: CJ ENM Center, Seoul

Programming
- Language: Korean

Ownership
- Owner: On-Media (1995–2010); CJ ENM Entertainment Division (2010–present)
- Sister channels: tvN; tvN DRAMA; tvN SHOW; tvN STORY; tvN SPORTS; Mnet; OCN; OCN Movies; OCN Movies 2; CATCH ON 1; CATCH ON 2; Chunghwa TV; UXN (4K UHD)

History
- Launched: December 1, 1995; 30 years ago

Links
- Website: tooniverse.cjenm.com/ko/ (in Korean)

Availability

Streaming media
- TVING (South Korea): Live C06941

Tooniverse (Korean: 투니버스; RR: Tunibeoseu; portmanteau short for Cartoon Universe and stylized as Toon!verse) is a South Korean cartoon and anime channel owned by CJ ENM Entertainment Division.

Since its inception in December 1995, Tooniverse is currently one of the leading animation channels in South Korea. Tooniverse broadcasts an extensive collection of programs that encompasses cartoon shows, movies, and popular content targeted across all age groups, including children, teenagers, and adults.

== History ==
Tooniverse officially launched on December 1, 1995, with the launch of cable TV in Korea, and was recognized as a channel more unfamiliar than terrestrial broadcasting in the early days. Up until its launch, cartoons were normally restricted to the 5-7pm timeslots on terrestrial television networks, as well as weekend mornings, per the law. This changed when Tooniverse launched and aired cartoons 24 hours a day. While the launch of the channel enabled cable subscribers to watch cartoons throughout the day, this raised concerns from viewers, as well as the nature of its programming, which was mostly imported, much like initial cable channels in Korea, which were considered to be plagued by repeats.

Most of the imported animations were Japanese, requiring attention from parents. As of 2009, the channel is operated under CJ ENM, which has steadily preoccupied the 5th place in the cable TV viewing market share as the viewership rate has gradually increased since 2000. A month before, the English education video Dooly's Backpacking was released.

On August 26, 1999, it received over US$10 million in foreign capital supplied by the Turner Broadcasting System, receiving programming and know-how. On November 1, 1999, Tooniverse expanded from the initial 17 hours to a full-day 24-hour schedule. Two two-hour Cartoon Network blocks featuring Cartoon Network originals and Warner Bros. series were added, as well as StarCraft tournaments and related programming. In June 2000, the channel started airing adult animation series; the first of which being Stressed Eric.

On March 1, 2002, it started broadcasting on SkyLife channel 656, a digital satellite broadcasting service that has been officially commercialized, and became the most popular viewership rating in the skylife by overtaking other channels. However, in November of that year, On-Media (now CJ ENM) unilaterally refused to renew the contract, and was exclusively broadcast through cable TV from January 1, 2003, to August 31, 2011.

In the meantime, as ad revenues in the pay-TV market fell sharply due to worsening management, the Internet Multimedia Broadcasting Business Act for IPTV commercialization passed the National Assembly in an environment of broadcasting and communication convergence, as part of the increase in revenues from subscription fees and diversification of the broadcasting market. In 2008, the second half of IPTV, the leading provider KT to start, and in 2009, latecomers, which was SK Broadband and LG U+ communications by three after consultation with IPTV operators, and initiate transmission. In 2011 CJ Group after the acquisition, the animation in the channel for children was to change the broadcast genre channels, the same year on September 1 from contingent upon the ongoing needs of satellite subscribers, the digital satellite broadcasting service, SkyLife (Hereinafter referred to as KT OTS), transmission to HDTV channels was resumed in 9 years. On August 15, 2012, the logo and slogan were changed to the current one, and HDTV broadcasting was officially launched on January 11, 2013, one year and four months after the establishment of the HDTV channel.

Currently, it can be watched through all cable TVs in Korea, KT's Olleh TV Live, SK Broadband's BTV, and other communication companies' IPTV and digital satellite broadcasting (KT SkyLife).

Preschool programs that aired on the morning of March 2011 was replaced by LittleTooni.

In 2012, Tooniverse created their first teen television series, Ma Boy. The Starleague professional StarCraft: Brood War broadcasts began as a program on Tooniverse before being spin-off onto a dedicated gaming channel, Ongamenet.

In April 2013, Marvel TV Animation series program exclusive contract. On July 26, 2013, KidZania Seoul opened a "studio actors" where children could experience being a voice actor.

In 2014, the Tooniverse store opened in Lotte World. Meanwhile, it was announced that Tooniverse would air a pilot episode titled The Haunted House (신비아파트). In 2016, Tooniverse created the first season of The Haunted House: The Secret of the Ghost Ball. The following year, it was announced that there would be a season 2 to the series.

On April 2, 2018, Tooniverse's website has opened, and was shut down Tunisia Games website.

In 2018, Tooniverse plans that The Haunted House going to be in film, video game and other media series. And produced another drama series called Remember, Hari, which was a live action drama based on the animated series.

In the same year, the show returned with a season 2 that was named The Haunted House: The Birth of Ghost Ball X.

In 2020, Tooniverse announced that would be a season 3 to the series that was called The Haunted House: Ghost Ball Double X Part 1 and Part 2.

In 2021, the new season premiere in September, 2021 called The Haunted House: Ghost Ball Z.

After finished the Part 1, Tooniverse announced have right to streaming on TVING in special episode released on December 22, 2021, called The Haunted House Special Edition: The Vampire of Light and the Child of Darkness, and also aired this channel. And then later release April 28, 2022, titled Guido Exorcist in Part 2.

Following the partnership between CJ ENM and Paramount along with launching Paramount+ into TVING streaming platform, Tooniverse is bringing Nickelodeon cartoons to the channel under the Nickelodeon Time programming block.

In August 2022, Tooniverse announced that the show is going to be aired on Jujutsu Kaisen on September 23, 2022, as well aired on Erased, That Time I Got Reincarnated as a Slime, Sword Art Online and other anime to the channel under the TooniTeen (투니틴) programming block at every Friday & Saturday night from 10 p.m. KST.

After officially released on December 14, 2022, on The Haunted House: The Dimensional Goblin and the Seven Worlds, the next season will be premiered on March 30, 2023, called The Haunted House: Ghost Ball ZERO.

On April 27, 2023, another special episode called The Haunted House Special Edition: Joseon Exorcism Annals was released on TVING this summer.

== Logo ==
December 1, 1995 – October 14, 2000

October 15, 2000 – December 31, 2007

January 1, 2008 – August 14, 2012

August 15, 2012 – May 4, 2015

May 5, 2015 – February 28, 2019

March 1, 2019 – Present

== See also ==
- Nickelodeon
- Cartoon Network
- Disney Channel
- aeni
