= North Korean animation =

Animation in North Korea

Animation in North Korea began in 1948 and has been a growing industry since. Before the Korean War, the Pyongyang animation study opened in 1948. In the same year, the north region of the parallel 38th became a communist republic. From 1948 until the 1980s, Pyongyang animation studio produced more than two hundred films.

Aside from local productions, the SEK Studio (North Korea's primary animation producer) has been providing animation services for foreign clients in Italy, Spain, France, China, Russia, Japan and indirectly for the United States. In 2003, there were 1500 artists working in SEK, becoming one of the largest animation studios in the world.

== History ==
=== Founding an animation studio ===
Since the early years, animation has been seen as a propaganda tool in North Korea and state-supported. It has even been reported that Kim Jong Il was a fan of Daffy Duck. The state-owned studio has worked in local productions and collaborated with foreign studios.

In the mid-1950s, the DPRK sent young people to Czechoslovakia to learn animation techniques. In September 1957, the Korean April 26 Animation Studio (조선4·26만화영화촬영소) was founded, named in honor of the date when the Korean People's Army was created. It would later become SEK Studio, the only animation production unit in North Korea. A number of early Korean animations were produced with military struggle as the main theme.

In the 1990s, North Korea became involved in globalized animation production, and the first step for North Korean animation to expand their overseas business began in 1985 with an olive branch thrown to them by France. North Korea's cheap domestic labor is what makes it an advantage to become a world animation foundry, and the head of SEK Studio, Koh Young-chul, claims that they have completed more than 250 outsourced animation films for animation companies in several countries, including Transformers, The Lion King, Pocahontas, and Pinocchio, as well as Little Soldier Zhang Ga and Romance of the Three Kingdoms, which were completed in collaboration with China.

Currently, the main production aspects of North Korea's animation subcontracting are based on purely technical aspects such as painting and coloring, while things like scripting, conceptualization, and even the production of key frames still come from developed countries such as the United States and Europe.

=== International collaboration ===
In the 1980s, the studio employed around 600 workers, and 20 animation directors.

As a result of the Sunshine Policy of Kim Dae-jung, between 2003 and 2005, North Korean animators collaborated with the South Korean production company Iconix. In 2005, Empress Chung became the first collaborative animation between South and North Korea through Korean animator Nelson Shin.

Outsourcing International works dropped in 2008 due to political issues. The conservative South Korean president Lee Myung-bak ended the Sunshine Policy, impeding the collaboration between North Korean companies. Since 2009, the most visible collaboration of North Korean studios is with Chinese companies. In 2014, SEK participated in the Shijiazhuang International Animation Exhibition.

In 2024, a server leak revealed that the North Korean SEK Studio had worked on American cartoons such as Invincible and Iyanu: Child of Wonder, despite American sanctions against North Korea making such work illegal.

== Works ==
- Boy General
- Clever Raccoon Dog
- The Great Book of Nature
- Squirrel and Hedgehog

== See also ==
- List of Korean animated films
- Manhwa
- South Korean animation
