= Squirrel and Hedgehog =

North Korean animated television show

- DVD cover
- Hangul: 다람이와 고슴도치
- RR: Daramiwa Goseumdochi
- MR: Taramiwa Kosŭmdoch'i
- Genre: Animated series, children's series
- Created by: Kim Jun-Ok (Pilot, Episode 1-4), Kim Yong-Chol (Episode 5-)
- Directed by: Kim Jun-Ok (Episode 1~4), Kim Yong-Chol, Kim Kwang-Song, Do Chol, O Sin-Hyok, Yun Yong-Gil, Ri Sok-Hun, Ri Chol
- Voices of: Won Jong-Suk and Kim Thae-Ryon
- Theme music composer: Kim Myong-Hui Pyongyang Ryulgok Secondary School
- Opening theme: "철벽의 동산 꾸려나가자" (Let Us Fortify Our Hill)
- Country of origin: North Korea
- Original language: Korean

Production
- Running time: 18-27 minutes
- Production companies: SEK Studio (Animation); Film and Radio Music Troupe (DPRK's Music and Audio Studio)

Original release
- Network: Korean Central Television; Manbang
- Release: 1977 – June 6, 2012

Squirrel and Hedgehog (Korean: 다람이와 고슴도치) is a North Korean animated series made by SEK Studio. Squirrel and Hedgehog is one of the most popular animated series in North Korea. The show was supposedly discontinued in 2012, which was around the time North Korean state television changed its broadcasting schedule, which cut several animated programs along with it.

The first episode of the show, produced in 1977, is based on a short novel published in a North Korean children's magazine in the 1970s. The short film was so popular with the public that the crew decided to turn the show into a series. In 2006, the producers said the show would be in production.

The series was re-aired on Korean Central Television since July 2023 for the show's 46th anniversary. It is currently being re-aired as of July 2025.

A sequel is currently in production, according to a report from the Rodong Sinmun, the official newspaper of the ruling party of North Korea.

== Characters and locations ==
=== Flower Hill ===
A loosely defined territory composed of a variety of terrains such forests, tundras, and deserts. The territory is inhabited by a plethora of creatures, most of whom reside in their own individual villages corresponding to their species. These creatures most commonly include squirrels, hedgehogs, and ducks, with minorities of animals such as bears and rabbits being present as well. Flower Hill operates as a democratic, diverse, communitarian, and heavily militarized federation of villages attempting to live and prosper in harmony in spite of the imperialistic aggression from their neighboring territory and archenemy, the Weasel Empire.

In the first episode of the series, "Lesson for the Squirrel" Flower Hill, or at the very least Squirrel Village of which both Geumsaegi and Juldarami originate from, exists as a humble and rural village within the forests of Flower Hill, operating as a democratic and communitarian society, defended solely by a brown bear known in English as Gom, though most commonly referred to as "Uncle Bear", a large, rugged, well-meaning but slightly narcissistic and arrogant bear who serves as protector of Squirrel Village. However, when Mice from the neighboring Weasel Empire sway Bear into accepting a package of alcohol (Likely meant to be vodka) from them, he becomes severely drunk and passes out. Once rendered unresponsive, Weasel and Mice soldiers from the Empire would assault the Village and proceed to pillage and burn it with no retaliation from its residents.

Following this brutal and devastating attack on the village, Bear would be deemed unreliable and a liability to the continued existence of the Village, and was likely relieved of his duties subsequently after. Squirrel Village would thus establish its own military with assistance from neighboring Hedgehogs, and would proceed to wage war against the Weasel Empire for the attack on the Village. From this moment forward, Flower Hill would undergo a significant period of militarization, stockpiling an arsenal of firearms, tanks, battleships, artillery, and other such equipment to defend itself from the Weasel Empire.

=== Symbolism and historical representation ===
Flower Hill has served as the primary subject of discussion of whether Squirrel And Hedgehog serves as a creative work intended to instill and enforce anti-American, anti-Japanese, anti-South Korean, and/or general anti-Western sentiments amongst the youth of North Korea.

Flower Hill has been claimed by viewers and critics of the show on many occasions to serve as an allegory for North Korea and its conflicts both past and present with opposing nations such as the United States, Japan, and South Korea.

Many have cited Flower Hill's passivism and humble rural environment and lifestyle, in contrast to the brutal and aggressive imperialism, industrialism, and militarism of the Weasel Empire, as being a correlation between pre-divided Korea and the Empire of Japan respectively. This is credited significantly further by the response of Flower Hill to the assault on the squirrel village by the Weasel Empire in the series, that being to significantly militarize itself in order to effectively defend itself from further threats by such imperialistic forces, a plot point that is in direct parallel with North Korea's own authoritarian, militaristic, and Stalinist policies born out of decades of historical trauma inflicted by Imperial Japan through the brutal colonization of Korea.

These events in the show have been associated by viewers and critics with historical and/or real world events and ideas, most prominently, the invasion and annexation of Korea by the Empire of Japan, as well as one of the fundamental policies of North Korea's state ideology and politics, Songun ("Military First"), an idea turned into state policy by the first Supreme Leader of North Korea, Kim Il Sung, one which dates back as far as the 1930s during his years as a guerrilla fighting against the Empire of Japan. Songun is a policy that prioritizes the Korean People's Army as being a fundamental and intrinsic part of North Korea's innerworkings and politics. This ideology was implemented as a policy in North Korea in 1962, however would be discussed by Kim-Il Sung decades prior in a plethora of his own written works, with him emphasizing a strong, fierce, ideologically homogenous military being essential to the establishment and continued existence of an independent Korea following the decades of brutal colonialism and occupation of the Korean peninsula by the Empire of Japan, emphasized even further following the Korean War between North Korea and the U.S led U.N intervention in support of South Korea.

These historical events have been compared to the events of the first episode of the series, in which the passive, rural territory of Flower Hill is assaulted by an aggressive, militaristic, Imperial Empire whose brutality includes the pillaging and burning of a village inhabited by vulnerable and passive squirrels. The only virtual difference being, that whereas the Korean peninsula was successfully occupied and annexed by the Japanese, and decades of brutal imperial rule ensued. Flower Hill would instead successfully defend itself from suffering such a fate, with this being interpreted as North Korea's way of illustrating "what could've been" if it had military prowess.

Furthermore, other such correlations made between Flower Hill and North Korea, include how Flower Hill operates. With the territory being depicted as a communitarian utopia, which can be interpreted as being socialist or communist in practice, alongside this, the illustration of Flower Hill as a utopian commune is also correlated to how North Korea prefers its people to view their country through extensive propaganda such as Squirrel And Hedgehog. It has also been claimed on numerous occasions that Uncle Bear represents the Soviet Union, not only due to bears famously being associated with Russia, but also due to Uncle Bear's status as protector of the squirrel village, which represents North Korea. This is further evidenced by how the leadership and inhabitants of the squirrel village relieve Bear of his duties following his failure to protect them from the Weasel Empire's attack. This has been historically connected to North Korea's fierce desire for independence along with their attempts at distancing itself from the Soviet Union politically, economically, and militarily, despite having required substantial assistance from outside second world nations to continue thoroughly functioning. Bear's consumption of alcohol reminiscent of vodka, an alcoholic beverage originating from Russia, has also been used as evidence to claim that Bear serves as a representation of the Soviet Union.

SEK Studios, upon being made aware of these claims, would deny them by stating that Flower Hill, along with the antagonists of the series, such as the Weasel Empire, do not serve to represent any past or present political entity such as North Korea or Japan. With the studio instead stating that Flower Hill served to inspire patriotism and dedication to North Korea in the same vein amongst the youth of North Korea, rather than to directly symbolize any nation in particular.

=== Flower Hill character synopses ===
- Geumsaegi (금색이/Golden, Code name "Pang-ul-ggot") - He is courageous, strong willed, and patriotic, with him formerly serving as the de facto leader, or at the very least, held a position of leadership within the squirrel village. He serves in the series as an operative and scout of Flower Hill, masquerading as a mouse within the military of the Weasel Empire under the code name "Pangulggot", serving alongside his comrade, Juldarami, as they both foil the plans of the Empire. The series follows him as he ascends within the ranks of the Empire, foils the schemes of the Empire in their conquest of Flower Hill, grows increasingly closer to the General Commander, and successfully impedes the attempts of antagonists such as Mulmangcho, and those who know his identity from exposing him as a spy of Flower Hill. This charade continues onward into season two, however with the Empire having been dissolved by Flower Hill following the conclusion of season one. Geumsaegi now must infiltrate the military complex of the wolves, a faction just as imperialistic and barbaric as the weasels who have picked up where the Empire had left off in its conquest of Flower Hill, and have even attempted to assimilate remnants of the Empire under their own command.
- Juldarami (줄다람이/Striped Squirrel) - He is similar to Geumsaegi, being brave, strong willed, and immensely patriotic. He is a scout and operative serving on behalf of Flower Hill, with him serving in his own position within the military complex of the Weasel Empire, fluctuating between various positions of leadership in the military of the Weasels in a similar vein to Geumsaegi. When not on his own escapades, he serves to assist Geumsaegi in his own missions, to foil any plots to expose the both of them as spies, and carry out the broader agenda of Flower Hill. Given that he and Geumsaegi serve alongside one another as undercover operatives, along with the shared experiences garnered from that, They both share a deep and affectionate bond with one another. In the first episode of season two, "Operation Noose", during the siege of a cruise ship by Mulmangcho, Oegwipari, and other stragglers of the recently dissolved Weasel Empire in order to capture important documents belonging to Dr. Mole, Juldarami in a split second decision takes a bullet for Geumsaegi, with him being killed as a result. This tragedy sets the stage for the season, likely serving as a deliberate plot point to further radicalize its viewers into adhering to the nationalistic and anti-imperialist rhetorics that the show projects.
- Bamsaegi (밤색이/Brown) - Bamsaegi is a main character in the second season, following Juldarami's injury. The younger brother of Geumsaegi, he initially trained to become a scout for the military but after hearing about the weasels' defeat; he dropped out to join the scientific field instead and become an assistant to the MacGuffin of the season, Dr. Dudeoji. Because he was confident that the weasels were killed, he dropped his guard immensely and took in a disguised Mulmangcho and Oegwipari. After his folly leading to Dudeoji's capture, he would become a scout again.
- Scout Kosŭmdochi (고슴도치 정찰병/Scout Hedgehog) - Scout Goseumdochi is a recurring character. Initially, he was Juldarami's field partner when he was disguised as "Big Field Mouse", while Goseumdochi would embody the fibbing of being "Small Field Mouse"'s corpse after the crow carrying him dropped his pod. Later, he would become Geumsaegi's scouting partner and occupy his role in the shadows. It was when a mouse soldier reported his presence to the Chief of Staff, causing a large manhunt for his immediate arrest while he desperately tries to contact headquarters. He would then kamikaze a stolen plane into the enemy's Ice Cannons, taking them down with him. Following his death, he would appear in flashbacks.
- Mulori "Mulangae" (물안개) - Mulori is a recurring character. She would first appear as a liaison officer disguised as a crow to help Juldarami and Geumsaegi. In her next appearance, she would get kidnapped by Mulmangcho, Oegwipari and Mulsajo and bring her to the One-Eyed Commander. During a speed boat chase, they would find themselves surrounded by Juldarami's mice, forcing Mulsajo to escape underwater with a stack of documents. The duck would leap out of the boat into combat, and then pulls the trigger of one of Mulsajo's grenades with her beak. It was assumed that she would have perished with him, but instead had fallen into a brief, catatonic state. In a later episode, she would go with a disguised Mulmangcho, Oegwipari and Black Weasel, with herself disguised as a goose in order to convince them that she was a Tokgasi agent. She would drop the act upon them getting onto a helicopter, with her crashing her plane into a weasel warship which finally kills her.
- Undochi (은도치) - Undochi is the younger brother of the late Scout Goseumdochi. He had coincide his training with Bamsaegi, and even remarked that his performance was better than his own before the latter dropped out of training. Undochi is named after his sliver skin.
- Gomajeossi (곰 아저씨/Uncle Bear) – Uncle Bear is a minor character. He lived on the outskirts of Squirrel Village and was their self-proclaimed protector, having shown his immense strength to make the squirrels believe that they were to stop making defenses against the weasels. He was proven to be faulty when one of the General Commander's mice gave him alcohol, causing him to be slurred and drunk, rendering him completely useless and unable to attack the weasels.
- Commander Mulori (물오리 선장/Wild Duck Captain) - He is the commander of the Duck unit and interchangeably, Flower Hill's navy. Compared to Commanders Darami and Goseumdochi, he does not get much attention in terms of animation. However, in the first three episodes, he had a larger role; such as constructing a duck "bridge" for Geumsaegi and a hedgehog scout to cross and partaking his army in the Tonghwa River genocide against the weasels.
- Commander Darami (다람쥐 사령관/Squirrel Commander) - Commander Darami is the second leading military officer of Flower Hill. It is implied that once Geumsaegi became a soldier, he took over his position. In the series, Darami frequently collaborates with Commander Goseumdochi.
- Commander Goseumdochi (고슴도치 사령관/Hedgehog Commander) - Commander Goseumdochi is the leading military officer of Flower Hill. In the first episode, he persuades Geumsaegi into uniting with all of the other animals, and not just relying on Uncle Bear for their protection. After Bear proved to be a liability, he had his hedgehog scout rescue Geumsaegi and be brought to him. In the series, Goseumdochi frequently collaborates with Commander Darami.
- Pamnamu (팜나무/Palm Tree) - A briefly seen spy for Flower Hill.

=== Weasel Empire ===
The Weasel Empire are a barbaric, imperialistic regime composed predominantly of weasels, with a significant population of mice and crows. In the series, they serve solely to attempt to occupy and or destroy Flower Hill by any means necessary, along with pillaging their villages of all their resources, and likely enslaving all of their inhabitants.

The empire is heavily militarized, having significant manpower and advanced technology, such as tanks, battleships, and an arsenal of devastating, advanced weaponry, such as a cryogenic cannon that can turn entire islands into uninhabitable frozen tundras and effectively kill all life present on them.

The empire's ground forces are composed of both weasels and mice, with mice comprising the majority of the military's personnel, with them only ever serving as foot soldiers for the most part. Weasels also comprise a significant percentage of the empire's military, albeit slightly less prominently, with weasels serving in positions of command and leadership. Crows serve as the empire's airforce, participating primarily in aerial assaults and reconnaissance; the membership of their navy is not based on species.

The empire would be dissolved in the planned series finale "'Pangulggot' in the flames", in which Geumsaegi, along with collaboration from the armed forces of Flower Hill, would lead an assault against a prominent military base of the empire's that had been housing important commanders and generals. Following the infiltration of the base by Geumsaegi using a tank, along with the combined efforts of Flower Hill, the base would be completely destroyed, with both the General Commander and numerous other prominent figures such as Black Weasel perishing in the assault.

=== Symbolism and historical representation ===
Like Flower Hill, the weasels' depiction in Squirrel and Hedgehog is a prominent subject in the long-standing discussion of whether or not the series itself serves to propagate and enforce anti-American, anti-Western, and most especially in this case anti-Japanese sentiment amongst the youth of North Korea.

The weasels have been associated by viewers and critics of the series of intending to symbolize Japan, more specifically the Empire of Japan, attributed to the latter's extensive and brutal occupation and oppression of the Korean peninsula and its people from 1910 to 1945, until its liberation by the Allies in the concluding years of World War II.

The most prominent correlations cited between the weasels and Imperial Japan are their imperialistic ambitions and militarism. This is reflected in the crimes that were committed against groups they perceived as inferior, that being the people of Flower Hill in the context of the show, as well as their subjugation of conquered territories and collaboration with native inhabitants. In the series, the mice symbolize these collaborators, more specifically Koreans who cooperated with imperial Japan during its rule.

The depiction of the Japanese as weasels can also be interpreted as drawing on historical stereotypes. The weasels' sharp, slanted eyes and general cunning behaviour align with the common anti-Japanese and anti-imperialist imagery.

Upon being made aware of these claims, SEK Studio would officially deny there being any real world parallels in the series, claiming that the antagonists of the series only served to represent imperialistic forces, rather than any political entity from the past or present.

=== Weasel Empire character synopses ===
- General Commander (족제비 대장/General Commander) - Commander-in-chief of the Weasel Empire's armed forces, and heavily implied to be the leader of the Empire itself. He is the old, vitally unstable, but also malevolent and conniving leader of weasels, mice, and crows, as well as the spearhead of the campaign of conquest and destruction of Flower Hill. Being both commander-in-chief and the presumed leader of the Empire, he possesses the authority to execute any and all operations of the Empire's military at his whim, with him in many instances being the one responsible for having orchestrated these schemes, such as to disguise cluster bombs as watermelons and have them deployed and detonated within Flower Hill. Being the spearhead of war against Flower Hill, he vehemently fights for Flower Hill's dissolution, and more often than not, resorts to dirty, and vile tricks to bring about this reality, such as deploying undercover operatives in Flower Hill during a good faith competitive event between both Flower Hill and the Empire. The General Commander perishes in the season finale "Pangulggot In Flames" in which he is propelled into the sky by a jetpack, which subsequently explodes and kills him, thus ending both his rule, and the Empire itself. However his brother serves as a minor antagonist in season two, serving as one of the advisers to commander of the wolves.
- Mulmangcho (물망초/Forget-me-not/Buttercup (in Syenduk's translation)) - The Older brother of Oegwipari. He is an aggressive, short-tempered, but also maliciously calculating, menacing, and stubbornly determined mouse, and is one of the only characters in the show who knows that Geumsaegi is a spy, something of which he attempts to expose him of throughout the series via a plethora of elaborate schemes. Mulmangcho throughout the series serves in a variety of positions in both the Empire's and wolves' armed forces, going from a basic foot soldier under the Empire in early season one, to a guard commander under the wolves in season two. In season one, he serves for a time as an operative within the Empire's military, serving to provide intelligence and information to an armed rebel group established within the Empire, known simply as the "rebels" or "rebels of Mt. Rock" a group of former soldiers of the Empire and disgruntled generals who seek to perpetrate a coup d'état against the General Commander, with the Empire in the series fighting against this armed insurrection, alongside their war with Flower Hill interchangeably, the former of which is seen far more extensively than their war with Flower Hill. However, when the leadership of the rebellion is gradually picked off by the Empire, and is eventually dissolved following the assassination of its last surviving commander. Mulmangcho searches for other means of fulfilling his goal of destroying Flower Hill, coming to assist independent individuals such as Black Weasel in bringing about this in more efficient and effective manner than the Empire.
- Oegwipari/One-Eared (외귀팔이) - The brother and right-hand man of Mulmangcho. He is primarily illustrated as being cute and innocent in appearance, whimsical, clumsy, and very emotional, with him serving as a foil to Mulmangcho's straight man act and general comic relief. However, in spite of these "neutral" or less than malicious character traits, he is also portrayed as being cowardly, backstabbing, as well as tremendously inconsiderate and selfish, Like Mulmangcho, Oegwipari goes from being a footsoldier in early season one, to a guard commander in late season two, which is largely attributed to his brother and his successes. Despite the severe animosity between the two and their seemingly complete disregard for one another at several points in the series, they've both had many affectionate moments together, and often dance and celebrate with one another when they're successful in accomplishing their goals.
- Mulsajo (물사조) - He was the brother of both Mulmangcho and Oegwipari, and seemingly the middle child of the two. He served as the more considerate and empathetic of both siblings, with him making a makeshift memorial altar for Mulmangcho in their cave hideout when he had been presumed dead, catching a large fish to place as a momento, with his selfish and insensitive brother, Oegwipali, attempting to persuade Mulsajo into letting him eat the fish. Despite these qualities, he was no less calculating and ruthless, taking joyous pleasure at the idea of killing Mulori when she was restrained and captured by them. In the fourteenth episode "Moment in the Enemy Rear" during a scuffle underwater between both him and Mulori in a fight for a briefcase containing important intelligence, in the midst of making his escape with the intel by swimming towards a boat with both Mulmangcho and Oegwipari on board, Mulori pulled the pin of one of grenades attached to Mulsajo's vest, subsequently causing them to detonate and kill him, while Mulori would survive and later on reveal to Geumsaegi to have been alive the whole time later on in the season. Following this unsuccessful attempt to escape with the intelligence, back at their cave hideout, Mulmangcho and Oegwipari would instead mourn a supposedly dead commander as opposed to their brother. This likely either served as a complete retcon of his character, or was the almost comedic reveal that they never cared of Mulsajo, and may have actually despised him as demonstrated through mourning over this commander subsequently after their brother's brutal death. Mulsajo is never mentioned again after this episode, with neither Mulmangcho or Oegwipari mentioning his passing, let alone him to begin with.
- Chief of Staff (Korean: 족제비-참모장) - Chief of Staff was a former associate of the General Commander and, for unknown reasons had severe animosity towards him. After the unit's original defeat at the Okchon River, he had run away to start a rebellion against him known as the rebels of Mt. Rock. Thus, splitting the army into two. Despite how much he would collaborate with the General Commander in later days, he would still plot to dominate both the unit and Flower Hill following his death and for the General Commander himself, somewhat vice versa. After Geumsaegi brought him to the General Commander, in which he attempted to save face by claiming that he was a spy, was dismissed and was on his way to the hospital. Under One-Eyed's orders, his ambulance was denoted by Mulmangcho, killing nearly everyone inside.
- Black Weasel (검은 족제비) - A bespectacled brown weasel. Black Weasel was a primary antagonist who was a doctor, allegedly fought in the Okcheon River and is the One-Eyed Weasel's younger brother. He would debut in the series after his brother's passing caused by Juldarami, taking over his position and taking in Mulmangcho and Oegwipari as his accomplices who were mourning the former. Because of his relationship with One-Eyed Weasel, and perhaps from the influence of the Chief of Staff, would he also plot to betray the General Commander. He would eventually accomplish this goal by persuading Mangko, who was an associate of the Chief of Staff, to overthrow the General Commander. This was only temporary as Mangko himself was eventually killed from a fake funeral service for the General Commander. In spite of this, he would gain the General Commander's complete trust and after exposing Geumsaegi and Juldarami to be spies, was promoted to the Chief of Staff. However, Black Weasel would perish in a crossfire shortly after being promoted.
- One-Eyed Weasel (애꾸 특무대장, 돌산 참모장/Scout Commander) - The One-Eyed Weasel was an associate of the Chief of Staff, a professional boxer and a member of the rebels of Mt. Rock. Like most weasels, he looks after himself and does not qualm about the death of his boss to keep the Tokgasi Chain a secret from the General Commander. In a particular instance, he was sent to Rabbit Village with Juldarami, who he correctly deduced as a Flower Hill spy, and was shot by him in an escape orchestrated by Mulmangcho.
- Dr. White Weasel (흰 족제비 박사) - A white, elderly weasel who was a marine biologist who owned a pet shark, and was the head of the Sturgeon Base. In terms of his area, he was more strict when it came to where to go, as he reported a roaming Juldarami to Jogjebi. It was assumed that he had died from poisonous gas, but in the second season, it was revealed that he miraculously survived and now commands the Iron Crow unit on Toggaebi Island with other remaining soldiers. As a result, along with his declining health, he gains a more distrusting attitude towards anyone.
- Mangko-Jogjebi (망코 족제비/Mangko) - Mangko was another associate of the Chief of Staff who plotted to overthrow the General Commander, but for a period of time, seemed to get out of his influence as a loyal soldier. Briefly, he was also the presumed leader of the Lobster Isle and in an operation, disguised bombs as watermelon. Chief of Staff's influence would come back to him through Black Weasel, he would go back to overthrowing the General Commander and succeed in such. His rule over the unit would prove to be temporary, as after General Commander's fake funeral, had him enter the coffin instead and electrify him in it.
- Field Mouse No. 2 (필드 마우스 2번) - He was a scout and undercover operative serving on behalf of the rebels of Mt. Todok, a mutiny against the Weasel Empire that would later become the rebels of Mt. Rock. he would serve alongside another operative in their mission to infiltrate Flower Hill from within. He is intelligent, quick witted, and strong willed, with him being the only mouse in the series to compare to Mulmangcho in terms of their intelligence and character traits, with them both being much unlike the typical mouse. Field Mouse No.2, alongside his fellow operative, were scheduled by the leadership of Mt. Todok to be deployed within the territory of Flower Hill via crows in the early morning hours, this plot however would be foiled by Guemsaegi and his comrades, as Flower Hill had been tipped off regarding his mission earlier. A skirmish would subsequently ensue, with No.2's partner being killed, with No.2 himself supposedly haven fallen off of a cliff and perished by the hands of Geumsaegi, with Geumsaegi and Juldrami masquerading as the both of them following their deaths, with the both of them being subsequently delivered by crows to Mt. Todok. No.2 would later make a surprise return later on, with it being revealed that he had not in fact died, and that he either knew or had a hunch that Geumsaegi and Juldarami were spies. No.2 would be killed by Geumsaegi following the former having been given a mission and sent to travel alone through the woods.
- Search Commander (수색사령관/Susaegsalyeong-gwan) - There are two Search Commanders. The first Search Commander was secondary to the General Commander and captured Juldarami in the first episode, along with leading his mice after to incapacitate Geumsaegi and a hedgehog soldier before falling into a river. This would severely injure his neck, but he remained active in the military. He was killed by Scout Goseumdochi, who shot a quoll into his neck and into his chest. The second Search Commander was more mutinous and, presumably, an associate of the Chief of Staff. He was the leader of the Wolfspider Cave rebellion and after its destruction, was killed by Geumsaegi.

=== Wolves' Den ===
The Wolves' Den, like the Weasel Empire, is an imperialistic rivaling army to Flower Hill and, the main antagonists of the second season after the destruction of the latter. The unit not only has wolves, but weasels, mice, foxes and crocodiles. The wolves are supposedly "more violent" than the Weasels, but the soldiers in particular seem to unintelligent; likely for comic relief. It is indicated that by old merchandise, and North Korea's own slogan "잊지 말라 승냥이미제를!" (Never forget the U.S. imperialists, those wolves!), that the wolves represent the United States of America. The unit was inspired by an 1991 manhwa, Brave Hedgehog.

- Commander Seungnyangi (승냥이 대장) - He is the main antagonist of the second season. Like the General Commander, he is old, but has a sustainable amount of intelligence and influence over his subordinates through intimidation, which could be why as of now there is no mutiny. He himself shows no regard towards his subordinates' lives. In the fandom, he was given the name "Captain Keoteo".
- Assistant Weasel (족제비 보좌관) - Assistant Weasel is an assistant to Seungyangi and, the twin brother of the deceased General Commander. He initially appeared in the fifth and sixth episodes to act as his decoy and doppelgänger to be assassinated by a field mouse, in an act to convey the image of a squirrel killing the General Commander to isolate Flower Hill away from them. This plan was thwarted when a hedgehog scout arrested his would-be assassin. He would later appear in the second season as a liaison officer from the weasels to the wolves, and eventually joined the unit as a member.
- Officer Yeou (여우 장교): She is another assistant of Seungyangi and the first female antagonist of the series. She is derived from the Brave Hedgehog manhwa, where she had a more gender-neutral (and presumably, male) design. For the series, she was redesigned to have a more feminine appearance. Despite being the most popular character of the series, she only appears for the last two episodes of the season.

=== Other Flower Hill affiliated villages ===
- Squirrel Village -
- Rabbit Village
- Fowl Village
- Giraffe Village (only referenced)
- Deer Village (only referenced)
- Monkey Village (only referenced)
- Weasel Village (only referenced)
- Bear Village (only referenced)
- Elephant Village (only referenced)
- The Desert Lands (only referenced)

== Voice cast ==
- Geumsaegi: Unknown (episode 1, 2~4) → Won Jong-Suk (episode 5~31) → Heo Kyong-Hui (episode 32~)
- Juldarami: Unknown (episode 4) → Kim Tae-Ryon (episode 10~13, 17) → Won Jong-Suk (episode 14, 15) → Rim Bok-Hui (episode 19~)
- Bamsaegi: Rim Un-Yong
- Scout Goseumdochi: Unknown (episode 1~4) → Kwon Nyong-Ju
- Undochi: Lee Eun-Ju (episode 27) → Choe Hyon-Ha
- Dr. Mole: Kim Tae-Hong
- Captain Weasel: Unknown (episode 1~4) → Kim Tae-Hong
- Mulmangcho: Unknown (episode 7~11) → Kim Thae-Ryon (episode 6, 12~26) → Won Jong-Suk (episode 27) → Rim Bok-Hui (episode 28~)
- Oegwipali: Kwon Nyong-Ju (episode 8~26) → Lee Eun-Ju (episode 27~)
- Dr. White weasel: Kim Tae-Hong
- Captain Wolf/Captain Keoteo: Unknown (episode 27, 28) → Kim Yong-Chol (episode 31~)
- Assistant Weasel/1st Lt. Choi: Kim Tae-Hong (episode 27) → Song Yong-Chol (episode 31~)
- Assistant Fox/Lt. Fox Vixen/2nd Lt. Yeau: Rim Un-Yong
- Field Mouse No. 2: Won Jong-Suk
- Other Actors: Chang Chun-Ha, Choi Soon-Bong, Song Yong-Sook, Kim Jo-Kyung, etc.

== Episodes ==
No.	Original title	English title (formal DVD title)	Directed by	Story	Music	Original air date
1	다람이가 찾은 교훈	The Lesson for Squirrel	Kim Jun-Ok	Kim Jun-Ok	Kim Jun-Ok, Kim Myong-Hui	1977
2	족제비네 소굴에서	In the Den of Weasels	Kim Jun-Ok	Kim Jun-Ok	Kim Myong-Hui	1978–1979
3	다람이의 복수전	The Revenge Battle of the Squirrel	Kim Jun-Ok	Kim Jun-Ok	Kim Myong-Hui	1980–1981
4	정찰병 금색다람이	The Scout, Gold Squirrel	Kim Jun-Ok	Kim Jun-Ok	Kim Myong-Hui	1982–1983
5	끝나지 않은 싸움	The Continued Battle	Kim Kwang-Song	Kim Hwa-Song, Ri Yong-Chun	Paek In-Song	February 8, 1997
6	금색이가 날린 전파	A Message sent by Gold Squirrel	Kim Yong-Chol	Kim Hwa-Song, Ri Yong-Chun	Kim Myong-Hui, Han Sang-Chol	September 29, 1997
7	독거미굴의 비밀	The Secret of the Wolf Spider Cave	Kim Yong-Chol	Kim Hwa-Song, Ri Yeong-Chun	Kim Myong-Hui, Ham Chol	December 13, 1997
8	돌산으로 날아간 특사	Envoy to Mt.Rock	Kim Yong-Chol	Kim Hwa-Song, Ri Yong-Chun	Kim Myong-Hui, Ham Chol	March 21, 1998
9	고슴도치의 위훈	The Great Service of Hedgehog	Kim Yong-Chol	Kim Hwa-Song, Ri Yong-Chun	Kim Myong-Hui, Ham Chol	June 12, 1998
10	돌산에서의 결전	A Battle at Mt.Rock	Kim Yong-Chol	Kim Hwa-Song, Ri Yong-Chun	Kim Myong-Hui, Ham Chol	September 1, 1998
11	검은 열쇠	Black Key	Kim Yong-Chol	Kim Hwa-Song, Ri Yong-Chun	Kim Myong-Hui, Ham Chol	October 30, 1998
12	위험한 적수	A Dangerous Enemy	Kim Yong-Chol	Kim Hwa-Song, Ri Yong-Chun	Kim Myong-Hui, Ham Chol	December 23, 1998
13	비밀문건	Secret Document	Kim Yong-Chol	Kim Hwa-Song, Ri Yong-Chun	Kim Myong-Hui, Ham Chol	February 2, 1999
14	적후에서의 한순간	A Moment in the Enemy Rear	Kim Kwang-Song	Kim Hwa-Song, Ri Yong-Chun	Kim Myong-Hui, Ham Chol	June 9, 1999
15	흰눈작전	White Snow Operation	Kim Kwang-Song, Do Chol	Kim Hwa-Song, Ri Yong-Chun	Kim Myong-Hui, Ham Chol	July 3, 1999
16	흰눈작전은 계속 된다	White Snow Operation Continues	Kim Yong-Chol	Kim Hwa-Song, Ri Yong-Chun	Kim Myong-Hui, Ham Chol	September 18, 1999
17	<방울꽃>은 보고한다	"Pangulggot" Reports	Do Chol, Kim Yong-Chol	Kim Hwa-Song, Ri Yong-Chun	Kim Myong-Hui, Ham Chol	September 20, 2000
18	파도를 헤치고	Through the Waves	O Sin-Hyok	Kim Hwa-Song	Kim Myong-Hui, Ham Chol	November 30, 2000
19	무서운 음모	A Hideous Plot	Kim Yong-Chol, Yun Yong-Gil	Ri Yong-Chun	Kim Myong-Hee, Ham Chol	April 1, 2001
20	밤하늘에 울린 폭음	An Explosion At Night	Kim Yong-Chol, Ri Sok-Hun	Kim Hwa-Song, Ri Yong-Chun	Kim Myong-Hui, Ham Chol	November 25, 2001
21	원수는 살아있다	The Enemies are Alive	O Sin-Hyok	Kim Hwa-Song, Ri Yong-Chun	Kim Myong-Hui, Ham Chol	June 25, 2002
22	보석목걸이를 찾아서	Searching For the Jewel Necklace	Yun Yong-Gil	Kim Hwa-Song, Ri Yong-Chun	Kim Myong-Hui, Ham Chol	December 24, 2002
23	철갑상어 기지에서	At the "Sturgeon" Base	Yun Yong-Gil	Kim Hwa-Song, Ri Yong-Chun	Kim Myong-Hui, Ham Chol	May 5, 2003
24	위험을 맞받아	Against The Danger	O Sin-Hyok, Gye Hun	Kim Hwa-Song, Ri Yong-Chun	Kim Myong-Hui, Ham Chol	July 10, 2003
25	벼락작전	"Thunder" Operation	Yun Yong-Gil	Kim Hwa-Song, Ri Yong-Chun	Kim Myong-Hui, Ham Chol	November 28, 2004
26	불길속의 방울꽃	"Pangulggot" in the Flames	O Sin-Hyok	Kim Hwa-Song, Ri Yong-Chun	Kim Myong-Hui, Ham Chol	January 2, 2005
27	<올가미> 작전	"Noose" Operation	O Sin-Hyok	Choe In-Song	Kim Myong-Hui, Ham Chol	December 27, 2006
28	두더지 박사의 비밀문건	The Secret Document of Dr. Mole	O Sin-Hyok	Kim Hwa-Song	Kim Myong-Hui, Ham Chol	January 1, 2008
29	흰 족제비 소굴에서	In the Den of White Weasel	Oh Sin-Hyok	Kim Hwa-Song	Kim Myong-Hui, Ham Chol	August 25, 2008
30	원수를 맞받아	Against the Enemies	Ri Chol	Choe In-Song	Kim Myong-Hui, Ham Chol	October 17, 2010
31	승냥이 소굴에로	To the Den of the Wolf Unit	Ri Chol	Choe In-Song	Kim Myong-Hui, Ham Chol	February 17, 2011
32	원수는 간악하다	Enemies are Vicious	Ri Chol	Choe In-Song	Kim Myong-Hui, Jong Pyong-Chol	June 6, 2012
33	TBA	TBA	Ri Chol	TBA	Kim Myong-Hui, TBA	TBA

== Controversy ==
There is speculation among overseas critics that the squirrels and hedgehogs are the North Koreans, the mice are the South Koreans, the bear is the Soviets, the weasels are the Japanese, the wolves are the Americans and the foxes are United States working class and minorities, which are argued to coincide with metaphorical interpretations of the country's geopolitical environment. But, this allegorical interpretation is never revealed in the series, and staff at the SEK Studio claimed that this allegorical interpretation is not true. They repeatedly alleged that this animation was created to teach love, friendship, and patriotism to children. However, Choi Sung-guk, a North Korean defector who worked at SEK Studio as an animator for several years, said that "weasels, mice, and wolves symbolize foreign invaders (imperialists)."

Jajusibo, South Korea's leading far-left and pro-North Korea media outlet, ran a column criticizing Westerners' allegorical interpretations of the show. Citing interviews with SEK staff, they pointed out that such political speculation about the show was "exaggerated by Westerners". One Yanbian Korean-Chinese netizen said, "I have loved this show since I was a child, but I never thought that such an allegorical interpretation exists in the show."

Meanwhile, The Chosun Ilbo, a conservative South Korean media outlet, criticized the show for being very violent, brutal, and blatantly allegorical propaganda.

== Merchandise ==
There are no known official records of merchandise, but brands of toothpaste and backpacks depicting the main characters have been sold in North Korean stores, along with toy guns and figurines. There are also several statues in children's parks that are located in Pyongyang.

A few Squirrel and Hedgehog video games are known to exist such as the 2018 mobile game Brave Scouts (용감한 정찰병), which is described as a 3D shooter starring a squirrel and a hedgehog carrying out missions in the Weasel Den. Two unnamed arcade shooters have also been documented: both games have the player shoot weasels and mice, with at least one of them using a rifle as controller, and the other one featuring the heroes of the television series in the HUD.

== Manhwa ==
Alongside the television show, a manhwa called Brave Hedgehog (용감한 고슴도치) was released in 1991. The story follows Detective Hedgehog who searches for an infiltrator disguised as a tanuki from Manure Mountain in Flower Hill. There are several key differences between it and the television series, such as the character Officer Yeou originally being depicted as male. It is unknown why this change occurred, but it could be to acknowledge that the United States Armed Forces had allowed women to fight alongside male soldiers. A second issue of Brave Hedgehog was published the following year of 1992.

== Outside of North Korea ==
The series was released in English and Spanish by Mondo TV, titled Brave Soldier and Soldados Valientes respectively. The series' plot was changed in the dubs, so that subtle references to North Korea or blatant propaganda would end up removed. This translation is often criticized for having generic voice actors and out of place audio dubbing. The second season was never dubbed due to licensing issues, as Mondo TV only owns the rights to the first selection of episodes.

In East Germany, it was released as a theatrical feature as Eichhörnchen und Igel schützen ihre Heimat (Squirrel and Hedgehog Protect Their Homeland), in which it combines the first 4 episodes. It was also said to have broadcast in the Soviet Union and China during the earlier years.

== See also ==
- North Korean animation
- SEK Studio, the studio behind Squirrel and Hedgehog
- Mondo Media
- Clever Raccoon Dog, an ongoing show produced by SEK Studio
- Boy General, another show created by SEK Studio
- Year Hare Affair, a Chinese webcomic starring anthropomorphic animals with similar political overtones
- Tomorrow's Pioneers, a Palestinian children's television programme
