= The Frog Kingdom =

- Chinese theatrical release poster
- 青蛙王国
- Directed by: Nelson Shin; Melanie Simka
- Written by: Mychal Simka
- Produced by: Zheng Liguo
- Production company: Vixo
- Release dates: December 28, 2013 (China); June 30, 2015 (United States)
- Running time: 90 minutes
- Country: China
- Languages: Chinese; English
- Budget: CN¥50,000,000
- Box office: CN¥21,951,474.01

The Frog Kingdom (Chinese: 青蛙王国) also known as Frog Games is a 2013 Chinese animated adventure drama film directed by Nelson Shin and Melanie Simka.

== Premise ==
The story centers on the Frog Princess, who runs from home after her father, the Frog King, announces that she will marry whomever can win the most medals in a sporting event called the Froglympics. She dresses as a commoner and befriends a vendor named Rain and Little Ken, his tadpole sidekick. Rain trains the Princess for the Froglympics, and she falls in love with him. Because the Frog King is embarrassed that his daughter is not present, he trains a doppelgänger as her stand-in. Little Ken soon discovers that four contestants in the Froglympics are actually spies for Snake King, a ruthless leader planning to invade the Frog Kingdom.

== Cast ==
Character	Chinese Actor	English Dub Actor
Freddie	Shi Renmao	Cameron Dallas
Princess Froglegs	Lin Yanjun	Bella Thorne
Frog King	Chen Mingyang	Keith David
Snake King	Chen Youwen	?
Captain One-Eye	Li Xiangsheng	Rob Schneider
Boogie	Hu Zhelun	Nathan Barnatt
Bestie	?	Dallas Lovato
Frog Queen	Cui Guofu	?
Inspector Noggin	Chen Zongyue	Gregg Sulkin
Minister	Hu Licheng	?
Prince Ababwa	Lin Zeyan	Mychal Simka
Muscles	Liu Lizhong	Drake Bell
Devo	Cai Wenzhe	Brandon Hudson
Boxer	Yang Zhixiang	?
Foofie	?	Romeo Miller
Robot Princess	Zheng Peiyun	Savannah Hudson
Announcer Froggie	Lin Zhixian	Talon Reid
Announcer 2	Lin Zhixian	Drake Bell

== Production ==
The Frog Kingdom was produced by the Jilin Animation Institute and its in-house animation company, Vixo. The film took five years to produce, and had a production team of 300 members, 80% of which were graduates from the Jilin Animation Institute. Additionally, hundreds of students contributed to the film's production. The film was directed by Nelson Shin and Melanie Simka, and produced by Zheng Liguo. It had a budget of CN¥50,000,000. The film was released in China on December 28, 2013.

== Reception ==
The film grossed CN¥21,951,474.01 worldwide. It was nominated for Best Animated Feature Film at the 2014 Asia Pacific Screen Awards.

Russian film critic Boris Ivanov, representing the online portal Film.ru, gave the animated film a negative review (5 out of 10 points), calling it “second-rate and lacking any original or interesting idea.” “The film treats its content quite unseriously and does not aim for anything beyond simple entertainment for young children,” Ivanov concluded.

== Awards and nominations ==
List of awards and nominations
Film award	Ceremony date	Category	Nominee(s)	Result	Note
Asia Pacific Screen Awards	December 11, 2014	Best Animated Feature Film	“Princess Frog”	Nominated	

== Sequel ==
There was a sequel released in 2016 "The Frog Kingdom 2: Sub-Zero Mission".
