= Boy General =

North Korean animated series

- Also known as: 소년장수
- Genre: History; War
- Country of origin: North Korea
- Original language: Korean

Production
- Running time: 15–45 mins. approx
- Production company: SEK Studio

Original release
- Network: Korean Central Television; Manbang
- Release: 1982 – 1997
- Release: August 2015 – December 22, 2019

Boy General (Korean: 소년장수) is a North Korean animated series made by SEK Studio (조선4.26만화영화촬영소). The show was based on Koguryŏ history. The Boy General is one of the most popular animated series in North Korea, the others being Squirrel and Hedgehog and Clever Raccoon Dog.

== Plot ==
The brave young warrior Seo-me defeats invaders which are intended to conquer his homeland Koguryo. In the first 50 episodes, the enemies are introduced as tribes with their chieftains. But after the 50th episode, the So state. From the 76th to 100th episode, the series focuses on Chung-Mu, Seo-me's son, after a 10 year timeskip.

== Episode Summaries ==
1. Soeme looks for his father among the victorious returning soldiers of Koguryo. But all he receives is his father’s bloody sword. Motivated by revenge, he aims to become a general and trains hard to build a great strength.

2. Soeme has built up a great strength to defeat enemies at one stroke overcoming all obstacles and dangers. On the other hand Paekgo who has infiltrated into Koguryo trains his son Hobi to hatch his devil plot. A hunting match between them is held. In this match Soeme hunts a tiger and becomes a boy general.

3. Soeme grows up through battles against enemies. Under the cheers of victory, enemies’ maneuvers are carried more seriously. By the maneuvers of Hobi and other spies, Soeme and his soldiers fall in a pit and Soeme is captured.

4. Soeme stands firm and bravely fights against enemies. Hobi who is promoted to a general, tries to draw enemies into the castle using Senior general while generals are out for hunting. Soeme listens enemies’ plot from an old man of Koguryo and firmly determines to devote his life for Koguryo.

5. The old man helps Soeme to escape but dies. Soeme accuses HoBi and other spies but he is misunderstood and is jailed by enemies’ tricks. Soeme wages unyielding struggles against enemies and defends their castle.

6. The enemies attack a Koguryo fort out of a judgement that it is vacant, but suffer defeated, far from opening its gate. They schemed to take hold of the key to the fort by using their spies, Paekgo and Hobi, who wormed their way into Koguryo to attain their goal. But their scheme is foiled by the struggle of Koguryo people who love their country, and the fort remains safe.

7. Soeme’s mother is seized by Hobi and Chokbal on her way to a governor-general, carrying with her a letter about enemy movement, so she is dragged into the enemy position. Availing themselves of this opportunity, the enemies plan to catch Soeme. Unaware of this plot, Soeme storms into the enemy camp alone only to be caught by the enemy. But he gets out of the enemy camp by the self-sacrificing struggle of vice governor-general and other Koguryo soldiers. At last he bitterly feels that his recklessness resulted in what gruesome consequences.

8. When the spirit of the Koguryo soldiers to destroy the arrogant enemies, runs high an ultimatum of the boss of the enemy troops is sent to Koguryo by Hobi. What does the ultimatum mean?

9. When their plan is conveyed to Koguryo by Soeme, the boss of the enemy troops and Chokbal map out another scheme timed for Chusok Harvest Moon Day. But Soeme’s mother hears this fact through the mouth of Hobi, and flies an arrow to Koguryo at the risk of her life. So the enemy scheme is frustrated and the spy who infiltrated into Koguryo is captured.

10. When the bell on the fort tolls on the basis of confession of cook, an enemy spy, the enemies launch an all-out attack at Koguryo. But the enemy’s wild dream ends in a fiasco by Soeme and other soldiers and people of Koguryo who love their country and cherish burning hatred for the enemies and finally Koguryo wins final victory.

11. Soeme achieves a great victory in the fierce fighting against the enemies to defend his native village. Carried away by the victory, he feels relaxed and gets slack and indolent, with the result that Ho Bi runs away after killing Kuk Hwa’s grandpa. What is the bitter lesson for Soeme ?

12. Soe Me is appointed as a garrison commander in charge of Chongu Castle and leaves his home village. His affection for mother, his native village and home folks and the memory of his childhood friends are cherished deeply in his heart. He is firmly determined to defend them.

13. Soeme is newly appointed as a garrison commander of Chongu Castle. Looking at fallen walls he couldn't find a way out. Who is the traitor that pulled down fort wall?

14. A doubt on a mason who stopped the arrows of enemies to Soeme with his body. A fierce battle against sudden enemies. What lessons does Soeme get?

15. Vice garrison commander acts uneasily. This makes Soeme a doubt. Soeme fights against enemies for map of the fort drawn by the mason. In this fight Soeme loses the mason, comrade of his father.

16. Due to treachery of vice garrison commander, there is a fierce battle against enemies who have delusion to occupy Koguryo. But thanks to Soeme and other young revengers, enemies’ plot goes to vain.

17. After achieving victory in the battle against enemies, the cheers of hurrah roll over the castle. And Soeme is ordered to find and give Chongu-sam to General Paekun. Enemies get to know this and chief of enemies and those like vice garrison commander who were infiltrated to castle scheme another plot.

18. Enemies who faced continuous defeat, scheme to put poison into wild insam sent to General Paekun and accuse Soeme of poison. What result will their plot bring about?

19. Though they were busy to fight against enemies, citizens of Chongu Castle wall up to Sonnyo Peak. In this time, traders with trade loads come into the castle. Who are the traders? What are there in their loads?

20. A spy makes a signal but enemies’ chief doesn't make an order to attack. Soeme doesn't know what plot the enemies are planning and prepares a new operation to attack enemies. Thanks to the patriotism of Kuk Hwa and other people of Koguryo who dedicate their lives for defending country, Soeme could achieve great victory in the final battle against enemies.

21. Yedong and Nalsae couldn't meet Soeme who was appointed as a costal garrison commander. When they are back home with emptiness they find the letter left by him. What is written on the letter?

22. Yedong and Nalsae used to think that they would be able to pass the martial art contest with their riding and lashing skill. But they fail to because of their strict master. When can they achieve their dream to be generals defending the country?

23. Though they had high ambition, Yedong and Nalsae become feeble-minded through intensive training. And they leave the training center for Soeme. On the way they encounter Hobi and Iri to fall into danger.

24. Lost his parents by pirates and grown up with little tigers, the boy is named “Pomdong” by Yedong and Nalsae. Riding on tigers to go to meet Soeme, Yedong and Nalsae and Pomdong are full of spirits in their mind to beat off enemies.

25. Yedong, Nalsae and Pomdong come to find pirates robing jewels at Fox Valley. But they meet Mira who arrested Kukhwa who was going to the training center to meet Yedong and Nalsae. Who is Mira? What do Yedong and Nalsae realize after the fierce battle against pirates?

26. Kukhwa has been caught by a daughter of the head of pirates, Mira and Yedong and Nalsae are inflamed with animosity against the enemies. Yedong, Nalsae and Pomdong have a firm determination to revenge enemies and defend the country, being generals and train themselves in the training ground again.

27. Unggo comes into the pirates’ cave with Soeme’s letter where Kukhwa was caught. What is in the letter and Unggo may come back safe...

28. Unggo has a narrow escape from pirates’ cave by the help of Kukhwa and gets on the enemy’s ship. Soeme gets to know the location of the enemies owing to sacrificing struggle of Unggo and Kukhwa who love the country.

29. Yedong, Nalsae and Pomdong have been confined in the flames of fire with tigers and they escape from danger by the sacrificing help of martial art master but they come to lose their valuable master. What do young revengers keep in mind, going through this?

30. Soeme had to find the treasures of the country which were robbed by pirates as early as possible but he couldn't know the secret route of the enemies. So he waits for Kukhwa’s signal with impatience. Can Kukhwa possibly complete a difficult mission?

31. Kukhwa becomes a mute due to the head and this works Yedong, Nalsae and Pomdong up to a violent temper. Young boys send a fire signal of going to war to Soeme in spite of unfavorable climatic condition cherishing Kukhwa’s mind to devote her life in the fighting of defending the country.

32. The enemies hold the head’s birthday party in an ostentatious manner for all they knowing that Koguryo armies is coming to attack them. What’s the enemies’ sinister design?

33. Koguryo achieves a great victory in the fighting against pirates due to Soeme, boy generals and soldiers. But the fighting against the enemies who watch for a chance to attack Koguryo does not end up.

34. Yedong, Nalsae and Pomdong have a fierce fighting to inform the enemies’ plot, spied out by Unger to Soeme as soon as possible. What do the enemies seek for?

35. Yedong volunteers to discharge a military order to escort an ordnance officer to the position who makes a new weapon. How does Yedong rescue an ordnance officer who was caught by enemies?

36. The young boys get into the fierce fighting against enemies. Among them, there is Pomdong who sacrifices himself without any hesitation to defend the mechanical crossbow which is permeated with the soul of his father.

37. Nalsae goes into the enemies’ den to spy out their plot. He fulfills his duty with credit by his wisdom and valor and finally he comes back to Koguryo.

38. The enemies’ ambition to defeat Koguryo becomes more and more conspicuous day by day. The enemies try to achieve their cunning purpose through overseas but their plot ends in smoke owing to Unggo’s sacrificing struggle.

39. Pau, who has infiltrated into the enemy gets a military order to come back to Koguryo. But the head Chokbal and the enemies of Koguryo scheme to invade again and he refuses to go to his homeland and infiltrates deeper into the enemy after knowing about it.

40. Chieftain who is afraid of the power of machinery crossbow schemes a cunning plot to seize them. Soeme gets to know about that from Pau and he gives a special mission to Unggo, Yedong and Nalsae. Amidst the tenacious pursuit of enemies such as cunning Hobi and atrocious Iri, young boy generals combine their wisdom and defend the machinery crossbow of Koguryo.

41. Talrae disguises as a granddaughter of the chieftain and gets into the enemy. What does she feel keenly, who has been revengeful of her brother’s enemy?

42. Chieftain plots to invade into Unha Castle using the cave. Talrae, running a risk, comes closer to an atrocious lion step by step to find the map of cave.

43. Though Talrae was happy to know the enemies’ plot to invade Unha Castle, she gets into prison due to cunning Hobi’s betrayal. Despite she is young, she fights bravely to defend the country like a beautiful azalea of Koguryo.

44. Yedong who goes to liaison outpost, Sambongsan Temple with the map of jewellery. It depends on not only the destiny of Talrae and Pau but also Unha Castle. Yedong defeats cunning Hobi and enemies with his excellent martial arts and wisdom and accomplishes his military order finely at the risk of his life.

45. In Unha Castle, there is a joyful holiday pastime on the occasion of the Tano festival. Chieftain and the enemies invade into Unha Castle covertly using this opportunity. But they were defeated again owing to Soeme’s outstanding plan and Koguryo soldiers’ ardent patriotism.

46. Vanguard leader Unggo and bandit boss Mira are tricked by Hobi. What is Hobi intending to do? What does Unggo find as a lesson who violates military discipline?

47. Mira is being used by enemies. To save her Soeme requests for a negotiation. What will be resulted?

48. To scout enemies’ camp on Mt Koema Soeme sends Yedong and boys from Pongdaechon to second boss of bandits. Hobi and chief of enemies get to know this. What will they plot?

49. Unggo teaches a lesson how to glorify a soldier’s sword by sacrificing his life. To revenge for him, soldiers of Koguryo turn out to fight.

50. Braving the bloody battles for defending nation, boys of Koguryo have grown up as generals. With their loyalty and bravery, descendants of Tangun nation, shout of victory echoes thorough the sky of Koguryo.

51. Our heroes have gone through many trials of fighting to defend lovely Koguryo. On that way, there were pleasures of victory and sorrow sacrifices but in their hearts, there was only patriotic loyalty for the country. When it is enveloped in joyous cheers of victory in Koguryo, in the West Country, the cunning plot is conspired to invade Koguryo again. Let's see the story afterwards.

52. The wedding ceremony between Soeme and Kukhwa goes into ruin owing to the sudden news that Kukhwa is the princess of Tolthan country. Because of this, Soeme and Kukhwa fall into agony and Hobi who narrowly escaped death is going to bring danger to Koguryo using this chance. What on earth is the identity of Kukhwa?

53. The West Country stretches out its unseen tentacles to Koguryo. Soeme who is a head of the guard, is willing to go to Tolthan Country with Kukhwa as an envoy of Koguryo and Mira's father's trading parade goes into his rank. What's their intention?

54. Soeme, the chief of escort in Koguryo gets to realize that cunning Hobi has been alive through the sudden assault to envoy parade. Otherwise, Hobi luckily escaped and he meets his mother and watches for a chance to attack Soeme's parade again. How severe fighting will be on the way?

55. The West Country makes the plot to break the alliance between Tolthan Country and Koguryo using the kidnapped crown prince of Tolthan Country. The king of Tolthan Country is swayed by misgivings that if he rejects Koguryo then, his country will be collapsed by the West Country and if he rejects the West Country, his son’s life will be in danger. So he gathers a meeting at the hunting place. But what result will the meeting make owing to the appearance of Blind Chief, the royal inspector of the West Country in here?

56. Soeme comes into the West Country to foil its plot and save the crown prince of Tolthan. What plot will the West Country make and what danger will Soeme get into?

57. The West Country makes a cunning plot on Mira, the head of bandit again due to disappearance of the crown prince of Tolthan Country and Soeme. Who on earth is Mira and why is KukHwa going to save her running a risk?

58. Who shot an arrow at the crown prince of Tolthan Country? Who on earth is the enemy who is going to conspire with the West Country and revolt against Tolthan royal palace.

59. Due to the cunning plot of the West Country and rebellion of minister of state, Tolthan Country is submerged in a sea of fire. How will the destiny of Tolthan Country be?

60. Soeme and Kukhwa complete the mission of envoy and come back to Koguryo. They have a grand wedding ceremony and make a happy family. But owing to Paekun who makes a cunning plot with the ambition to be a vice king, Soeme’s pleasure disappears in a sudden.

61. The plot harming the faithful vice king of Koguryo is planned. What opponents are hidden behind this plot?

62. What does the invasion of aggressors to Castle Chongu of Koguryo refer to? To lay bare the plot, the fierce fighting between Soeme and tenacious enemies is continued.

63. Is the vice king of Koguryo really a traitor? Facing the unexpected several events, what truth does Soeme disclose?

64. Who on earth sent the drawing of fortification of Chong U castle to the West country? What difficulties does Soe Me face by the plot of Master Paek Un of Koguryo?

65. The plot of Master Paek Un which harms the loyal minister still continues. What facts will Soe Me know soon? How can the messy happenings of the Court be arranged?

66. The request of loyal minister makes the heart of Soe Me burn with the enthusiasm of patriotism. On the other hand, the king in the West country is poisoned to death by the cruel acts of his son. At the same time, the disturbance on the frontier of Koguryo continues to rise. It tells what?

67. Ye Dong starts off to the West country which means an unpromising fate to him. He reveals his nature by a spy of the West country who infiltrated into Koguryo, but in this danger he gets to know the plot of West country through the contact with Tal Rae. How will the fate of Ye Dong be?

68. In order to defeat the cunning plot of enemies and to find a spy of West country who infiltrated into Koguryo, Soe Me plans a delicate operation. By the way, because of divulging of Nal Sae the operation falls in danger. Who is a spy and the result of attack of West country shows what?

69. Soe Me who is responsible for the Western military arms spends day and night for the preparation of the West country. On the other hand, Ye Dong had a hairbreath escape from death and joins with the young men of the village and a monk of a library of Buddhist sutras in order to find the attempts of “Black Wind” of the West country. What is the aim of “Black Wind” and who is the monk?

70. The brave soldiers of Koguryo such as Soe Me and Ye Dong fight furiously against the soldiers of the West country who invade into Kaemo castle. Join to this, the ordinary people of Koguryo defeat the enemies who invade through the muddy land. By the combined force of army and people, the scheme of West country is spoiled and Koguryo gives a hard attack to the West country.

71. The general attack of Koguryo military forces to punish the invaders to Koguryo begins. What tricks will the enemies in the tight corner take now?

72. The West country’s ambition for Koguryo is shattered into pieces. The struggle against West country ended in victory because of the bravery of the Koguryo army and people, including Soe Me, who loved the country, and the victorious military units return to Koguryo with joy.

73. When the song of victory resounds everywhere, the spies who were against Koguryo hatches a crafty plot. What danger will Soe Me encounter?

74. The continuous invasion of the North-aggressors urgently demanded the rapid acceleration of building the walls which had collapsed in the battle of West country. But Nal Sae, commander of the left, who is in charge of the quarry, is corrupted and degenerated by West country’s spy Yon Ji. What effect will this have?

75. Soe Me is heartbroken at the fact that Nal Sae, who was brother to him, committed a great crime against the country by the West country’s spy. But Nal Sae becomes a traitor to the country.

76. Soe Me’s son, Chung Mu, who was kidnapped by the West country, survives barely by a good hunter and lives in a mountain area under the name of Chon Dong. What fate will Chung Mu take…

77. The days are going deep yearning for the hometown, and Chung Mu grows up strong. At this time, the juvenile martial arts competition is held amid the cunning plots of the West country. What result will bring to the competition?

78. Chung Mu who got in sight of traitor Nal Sae in the martial art competition and Un Do, a woodchopper, and Ho Bi’s son Ho Du and the other kids are taken to an unknown place and are trained in high intensity. What is the purpose of the enemy?

79. Spies are gathering in the capital of Koguryo. Among them there are Chung Do, Un Do and traitor Nal Sae. Chung Mu returns home with pleasure as he wanted to go to Koguryo, where his parents are living.

80. To recoverthe defeat in Muju, West country is making preparations for sending spies into Koguryo and Tolthan. To find out the movements of the enemy, Soe Me decides to send his beloved son Chung Mu to West country again. Chung Mu, who cherished the intention of his parents, takes the patriotic road for the country.

81. Chung Mu, who returned to West country with a wounded Ho Du to find out the enemy’s plot. Chung Mu, who had overcome the repeated examinations, is now deeply submerged in the den of the enemy.

82. West country, which is trying to destroy Tolthan as one of the scaffolds for Koguryo. On the other hand, Yon Ji instigates Tolthan to send reinforcements into Koguryo. Because of the West country’s plot, there are some bad things between Koguryo, Tolthan, and West country.

83. West country’s spies try to kill the West country’s princess Mi Ra against reinforcements. Boss Su Bul and deputy boss Si Duk, who are going to find out the true colors of Yon JI, a Tolthan’s concubine, and to make West country’s plot known to Koguryo at the risk of danger. Boss Su Bul, Mi Ra’s foster father, unhesitatingly dedicates his life on this road.

84. Ye Dong who got military command and Koguryo soldiers waged a fierce battle against West country. West country’s plot to invade Koguryo by using Tolthan’s military forces is frustrated again and Koguryo won the victory again because of its patriotic loyalties.

85. To put a crush on the alliance between Tolthan and Koguryo, Yon Ji plots a trick and uses the traitor Nal Sae. In Tolthan, blood-stained civil war begins. What result will come out?

86. The continuous defeat in the battle against Koguryo and the hunger of the Kogal tribe makes West country more and more uneasy. This creates distrust among West country’s ministers and entails fierce fighting. In this period, Chung Mu loses his foster father. What kind of pain, ordeals and difficulties will lie in the way of Chung Mu who has embarked on the road of patriotism?

87. Chung Mu is in West country’s envoy crew with Peak Un, enemy of Koguryo. What is the purpose of the envoy crew and what will happen in the land of Kogal?

88. Chung Mu is trying to weaken West country’s military power by committing a breach of faith of ministers. Danger is always followed by traitor Nal Sea, who is trying to kill Chung Mu for his crimes. But he does not hesitate on the patriotic road he walks.

89. The greed of Ma Ryong, a general commander who is jealous of West country’s prime minister Mo Gol threats the throne and tries to take action. What will happen and what conclusion will come out?

90. The rebellion of Ma Ryong weakened the national power, but the aggressive ambition of the West country’s king to beat Koguryo has grown more and more. What plot are they making?

91. Chung Mu, who has become a guard of the West country’s king, uses the traitor Nal Sae to uncover the cunning plot of the enemy. What is the plan of Chung Mu and what happens to the fate of Nal Sae?

92. There is a confusion with the stolen Koguryo Frontier Military Force Map in West country. To reverse the dangerous situation, Soe Me gives fake map to Chung Mu. What response will the West country make?

93. The king of West country, with the Koguryo Frontier Military Force Map brought by Chung Mu, plans to attack Koguryo and entrusts a general commander Ho Bi to build a battleship. But Ho Bi, who was unable to finish the task of building battleship due to his gambling son Ho Du, tries to wipe out his fault with a cunning trick. By taking advantage of this opportunity, Chung Mu foiled the enemy’s plan who wanted to use navy.

94. Because of Nal Sae, head of the Hukphung, Pongtaechon village and the other Koguryo frontier villages are watered in blood. What trick does Chung Mu take when the danger follows the fate of the traitor Nal Sae.

95. West country’s general attack on Koguryo begins. The official in charge of garrison, Ye Dong and the army and people of Torae castle begin the fierce battle against the invaders from West country led by Ho Bi. But they get heavily defeated by the army and men and women of all ages of Koguryo who turn out to defend the country.

96. Chung Mu and Un do, who were commanded to wipe out the enemy’s provisions transport. Un Do who gave encouragement and kept company in the fierce struggle against the West Country. Un Do, a great son of Koguryo, unhesitatingly dedicates his precious life to the country.

97. The king of West Country, who faces even the food crisis, hatches a cunning plot to attack the Anphyong castle of Koguryo. Under the command of Soe Me, the resourceful official in charge of garrison, the army of Koguryo mercilessly wipes out the huge forces of the West Country and creates favorable conditions for fighting, thus dealing a telling blow to the West Country.

98. The king of Koguryo sends the reinforcement with the ticket to control the army, where the hard-fought fighting against the West Country is continuing. But Soe Me plans to strike a heavy blow at the enemy by dashing into the West Country with reinforcements. What difficulties will lie to Chung Mu in the courses of battle that depends the victory?

99. With the ambition to occupy the Anphyong castle, West country plans to build mountains with sand and attack the castle. Army and people in the castle are all turned out in response to the enemy's general attack. The united strength of the army and people stirs up the enemies and win another great victory.

100. After its victory, the Koguryo army fights a final battle to drive back the retreating West country's army. The boy generals sacrifice their lives defending the country, and Koguryo establishes itself as a lasting power in the East.

== Characters ==
Heroes

- Seo-me (the protagonist)
- Seo-me's mother
- Seo-me's grandfather (dies in episode 4)
- Chun-beom (Seo-me's father, dies before the series)
- Kukhwa (Seo-me's girlfriend, later wife)
- Jangsoe (Kukhwa's grandfather, dies in episode 11)
- Yeonmu (Kukhwa's father, dies in episode 73)
- Byeongjang (Ye-dong's father, dies in episode 7)
- Ye-dong
- Ungeo (Nalsae's cousin, dies in episode 49)
- Beom-dong (dies in episode 36)
- Dal-rae (Beom-dong's sister, Ye-dong's wife)
- Bau (Seo-me's friend)
- Dalmu (Seo-me's bodyguard, appears in sequel only)
- Mira (Toltan Kingdom's princess)
- Subul (Mira's biological father, appears in sequel only, dies in episode 83)
- Shiduk (Subul's subordinate, appears in sequel only)
- Chungmu (Seo-me's first son, appears in sequel only)
- Chung-gi (Seo-me's second son, appears in sequel only)
- Poongbal (Chungmu's adopted father, appears in sequel only, dies in episode 86)
- Undo (Chungmu's friend, appears in sequel only, dies in episode 96)
- Soo-ryeo (Undo's sister, appears in sequel only)

Villains

- Hobi (the antagonist, dies in episode 100)
- Baekgo (Hobi's adopted father, dies in episode 6)
- Black Shadow (dies in episode 9)
- Lee (Black Shadow's son)
- Pig Chief (dies in episode 11)
- Blind Chief
- Dolduryeong (Mira's adopted father)
- Shikbali (Pig Chief's subordinate)
- Head of Mount Daemasan (dies in episode 50)
- Baekwoon (appears in sequel, dies in episode 92)
- Eunchung (Baekwoon's son, appears in sequel only, dies in episode 73)
- So-mi (Baekwoon's daughter, Hobi's wife, appears in sequel only, dies in episode 100)
- Mogol Seung-sang (Hobi's biological father, appears in sequel only, dies in episode 100)
- Suap (Hobi's mother, appears in sequel only, dies in episode 100)
- Gombo & Padu (Hobi's subordinates, appears in sequel only, die in episode 100)
- Gakda (Blind Chief's son, appears in sequel only)
- Ami (Blind Chief's daughter, appears in sequel only)
- Hodu & Sodu (Hobi's twin sons, appears in sequel only, die in episode 100)
- Maryeong (appears in sequel only, dies in episode 89)
- Yeonji (daughter of Maryeong, appears in sequel only, dies in episode 85)
- Nalsae (Ungeo's cousin, dies in episode 94)
- Yanggwang (ruler of So State, appears in sequel only)

== Reception ==
The first series aired from 1982 to 1997 for 50 episodes. In 2014, the sequel to the show was announced and it started to air in August 2015: 50 episodes have been broadcast, with the 100th episode being broadcast on 22 December 2019.
