= Nelson Shin =

South Korean and American director

- 신능균
- Born: Shin Neung-kyun; 1939 (age 86–87); Pyongsan County, Kōkai Province, Japanese Korea
- Occupations: Animation director; Producer
- Years active: 1970–present

Korean name
- Hangul: 신능균
- Hanja: 申能均
- RR: Sin Neunggyun
- MR: Sin Nŭnggyun

Shin Neung-kyun (Korean: 신능균), also known as Nelson Shin, is a South Korean and American animation director of North Korean origin who is the founder and president of AKOM. He is known for having directed the animated films The Transformers: The Movie, Empress Chung, and The Frog Kingdom.

== Biography ==
Shin was born in Pyongsan County in what is now North Korea. In 1952, his family defected to South Korea amid the Korean War when he was 12 years old. His father then ran a store in Daejeon. After working on editorial cartoons and a few animated films in South Korea, he moved to the United States in the 1970s. During that time, he worked on the lightsaber special effects for Star Wars. He worked for DePatie–Freleng Enterprises and stayed with the company after it was acquired by Marvel Comics and was renamed to Marvel Productions.

In 1985, a rush for animation on My Little Pony: The Movie gave Shin the opportunity to found AKOM in Seoul. His studio created 300,000 animation cells for the film. AKOM produced animation for many foreign shows and films, including tens of thousands of frames for The Simpsons. Shin also produced The Transformers and directed The Transformers: The Movie. He grew tired of creating animations for other directors, so he sought to create the film Empress Chung as a personal passion project. He worked for seven years and spent US$6.5 million of his own money on the film. In order to save costs, he collaborated with the North Korean SEK Studio because North Korean animators are paid less than South Korean animators. The film made use of 500 animators, 400 of which were North Korean. Shin visited Pyongyang eighteen times to supervise production.

On August 12, 2005, Empress Chung became the first film to have been released simultaneously in both North and South Korea. It played in 6 theaters in North Korea and 51 theaters in South Korea. The film won a prize at the 2003 Annecy International Animation Film Festival and won the top prize at the 2004 Seoul International Cartoon and Animation Festival. Despite its critical success, it was a financial failure, earning only US$140,000.

In 2010, Shin was elected as the president of the International Animated Film Association, a position he held until 2012. He directed the 2013 Chinese animated film The Frog Kingdom, which was nominated for Best Animated Feature Film at the 2014 Asia Pacific Screen Awards. Shin has been described as the "godfather of animation" in South Korea.
