= Empress Chung =

2005 inter-Korean animated film

- Korean theatrical release poster
- Hangul: 왕후 심청
- Hanja: 王后沈淸
- RR: Wanghu simcheong
- MR: Wanghu simch'ŏng
- Directed by: Nelson Shin
- Screenplay by: Kim Jung-ha; Shin Jang-hyun; Yoo Kwang-hee; Kyong Seung-won; Kwon Young-sup
- Story by: Nelson Shin
- Produced by: Nelson Shin; Yi Jin-eun; Kang Min-woo
- Starring: Kang Hee-sun; Kim Do-hyun
- Edited by: Nelson Shin
- Music by: Sung Dong-hwan
- Production companies: AKOM; SEK Studio
- Distributed by: KOAA Films
- Release date: August 12, 2005
- Running time: 93 minutes
- Countries: North Korea; South Korea
- Language: Korean
- Budget: US$6.5 million
- Box office: US$140,000

Empress Chung (Korean: 왕후심청; RR: Wanghu simcheong) is a 2005 animated epic fantasy film, produced in North and South Korea and directed by Nelson Shin, on whose story the screenplay is also based. Empress Chung was the first film to release simultaneously in both North and South Korea. It saw critical acclaim and won awards at two film festivals, but was a commercial failure, earning US$140,000 against a US$6.5 million budget.

== Premise ==
Based on a Korean folk tale, the film follows a girl that sacrifices her life to a sea dragon in order to restore her blind father's eyesight. She is rewarded for her filial piety by being made an empress.

== Voice cast ==
- Kang Hee-sun as Sim Chung, a girl who becomes an empress.

== Production ==
Empress Chung was the personal project of Nelson Shin, a South Korean animator that founded AKOM. He spent seven years and US$6.5 million of his own money on the film. In order to save costs, he collaborated with the North Korean SEK Studio because North Korean animators are paid less than South Korean animators. The film made use of 500 animators, 400 of which were North Korean. Shin visited Pyongyang eighteen times to supervise production.

Shin incorporated aspects of his personal life into the film, such as turning his pets into characters. He also did historical research for the film; the film was initially planned to be set in the Goryeo era, but it was rewritten into the Joseon era to maintain historical accuracy. Several locations in the film are based on real Korean temples and palaces, including Gyeongbokgung.

== Release ==
On August 12, 2005, Empress Chung became the first film to have been released simultaneously in both North and South Korea. It played in 6 theaters in North Korea and 51 theaters in South Korea. The film won a prize at the 2003 Annecy International Animation Film Festival and won the top prize at the 2004 Seoul International Cartoon and Animation Festival. The film grossed US$140,000 on its opening weekend against a US$6.5 million budget. Empress Chung had no home media release and was previously considered to be a lost film. On December 31, 2025, an archivist uploaded a restored version of the film with added English subtitles to YouTube and later to the Internet Archive.

== See also ==
- Cinema of Korea
- Korean animation
- List of animated feature films of the 2000s
