= SEK Studio =

North Korean state-owned animation studio

- Native name: 조선4.26만화영화촬영소
- Type: State-owned
- Industry: Animation; Film production
- Genre: Stop motion; Computer animation; Traditional animation; Entertainment industry
- Founded: September 7, 1957
- Headquarters: Ot'an-dong, Central District, Pyongyang, North Korea
- Key people: Jun Ok Kim
- Owner: Government of North Korea
- Number of employees: ~900 (2014)

- SEK Studio
- Hangul: 조선4.26만화영화촬영소
- Hanja: 朝鮮4.26漫畫映畫撮影所
- RR: Joseon 4.26 manhwa yeonghwa chwaryeongso
- MR: Chosŏn 4.26 manhwa yŏnghwa ch'waryŏngso

Korean April 26 Animation Studio (Korean: 조선4.26만화영화촬영소), also known as SEK Studio (an abbreviation of "Scientific Educational Korea"), is a state-owned North Korean animation studio. It is based in Ot'an-dong, Central District, Pyongyang.

== History ==
The studio was founded on September 1957 as April 26 Children's Film Studio (4.26아동영화촬영소).

SEK Studio worked with foreign animators and companies with relative frequency for a North Korean operation during the 1980s, 1990s and 2000s. Around 1985, it worked on outsourced animation for European television. It worked on over 250 foreign animations. It mainly worked on subcontracted Russian, Italian, French, Spanish and Chinese animation, while working indirectly on outsourced American animation.

SEK worked on several animated series with Mondo TV, including Pocahontas: Princess of the American Indians and Simba the King Lion. SEK also produced animated features such as Gandahar and Empress Chung.

In 1997, in order to take part in an animation festival in France, it registered as the "Scientific & Educational Film Studio of Korea". SEK is an abbreviation of this name.

According to Cinema Escapist, its most prominent US projects were The Simpsons Movie, Futurama: Bender's Big Score, and an episode of Avatar: The Last Airbender. According to the Korean Film Council, SEK Studio worked on episode 72 of the 2003 Teenage Mutant Ninja Turtles series.

Recently, collaborations between SEK Studio and other nations have declined, with only China co-producing content. This can be attributed to rising tensions between North Korea and the West, especially the United States.

As of 2003, SEK Studio employed over 1,500 or 1,600 people and worked for over 70 companies from around the globe, including Europe, South Korea, China, Canada and the United States. After the introduction of advanced equipment, the number of employees was reduced to about 500. There are 11 animation production teams in SEK Studio. Nine are responsible for overseas animations, and two produce domestic animations.

Since 2010s, SEK studio has subcontracted many animation studios in China and outsourced Chinese TV series, web animations, game graphics and commercials. In 2014, SEK Studio cooperated with Chinese companies to establish an office in Beijing. SEK Studio has invested $70,000 in Chinese companies.

In December 2021, the US Treasury accused SEK Studio, and companies and individuals related to it, of exploiting North Korean workers to earn foreign currency and avoid sanctions on North Korea. In April 2024, a server leak revealed that some Western television series, such as Invincible and Iyanu: Child of Wonder, as well as the Japanese anime series Dahlia in Bloom, had been worked on by SEK Studio, despite sanctions. The official Twitter account of the anime issued a statement, saying that "neither the production committee nor the production studio were aware". The studio working on the anime, Ekachi Epilka, also posted on their homepage that their work files was used without their permission, and denied involvement with SEK Studio. They speculated that the leak came from a subcontracted company.

SEK Studio's staff is mostly composed of Pyongyang Art Academy graduates, and SEK Studio has established an animation training institute to teach young students.

Much of the work produced by SEK Studio is considered to be propaganda for North Korean children, as SEK Studio is state-owned.

=== Previous names ===
SEK Studio was founded in 1957 as April 26 Children's Animation Film Studio.

- Korean National Film Studio – Puppet Animation Film Research Institute (1957–1959)
- Korean National Film Studio – Animation Film Studio (1959–1960)
- Korean National Film Studio – Animation Film Production (1960–1964)
- Korean Children's Film Studio (1964–1971)
- Korean Science Education Film Studio – Animation Film Production Team (1971–1980)
- Korean Science Education Film Studio – Children's Film Production Team (1980–1996)
- Korean 4.26 Children's Film Studio (1996–2013)
- Korean April 26 Animation Studio (2013–)

== Filmography ==
=== Television ===
SEK Studio has produced over 300 animations.

English title	Original title	Year	Notes
The Young Challengers	나어린 도전자들	2026–present	Aired on 11 May 2026.
Prince Hodong and the Princess of Nakrang	호동왕자와 락랑공주	2023–2026	Updated to 14 episodes. Remake of the 1990 film.
Last Match	마지막 경기	2022	
Pine tree replanted	다시 심은 잣나무	2021	
Diary of a Little Photographer	꼬마촬영가의 일기	2021	
Oksoe Defeats a Devil	악마를 이긴 억쇠	2020	First released December 2020, features 5.1 sound.
Kimbap made by Hyuk	혁이가 만든 김밥	2019	
A day of Camping	야영의 하루	2018	
Our House Rabbit	우리 집 토끼	2017	
Ko Jomung	고주몽	2016–2025	50 episodes (also transliterated as Ko Jo Mong)
The Boy General (Series 2)	소년장수 (2부)	2015–2019	50 episodes (51-100)
Two Boys who Found the Answer	답을 찾은 두 소년	2015	
Awangnyo Finds out Fire for Kindling	불씨를 찾은 아왕녀	2012	
Ants to Suri Mountain	수리봉으로 간 깜장이	2012	
Ant and Big Centipede	개미와 왕지네	2012	
Byeolnam and Rubber Ball	별남이와 고무공	2011	
Singsing's Golden Fleece	씽씽이의 금빛털옷	2011	
The Bustle Caused by Scale Brothers	저울형제가 일으킨 소동	2010	
Young Warriors of Goguryeo	고구려의 젊은 무사들	2010–2014	7 episodes
An ant with wings	날개를 단 개미	2009	
Long Long Sunday	긴긴 일요일	2009	
The Enchanted Mountain	금강산 팔선녀	2008	A film based on the Korean fairy tale "The Fairy and the Woodcutter".
The Red Star	빨간별	2008–2012	Stop-motion animation. 12 episodes.
A Greedy Dog	욕심많은 개	2008	Based on the Aesop Fable "The Dog and Its Reflection".
Heungbu and Nolbu	흥부와 놀부	2008	A film based on the Korean fairy tale Heungbu and Nolbu.
Photographed by Chalkak	찰칵이가 찍은 사진	2008	
Stonefish Brothers	쏠치형제들	2007	
The Oriole's Song	꾀꼴새가 부른 노래	2007	
The Story of Two Generals	두 장군 이야기	2007	Remake of the 1976 film.
Squirrel and Hedgehog (Series 2)	다람이와 고슴도치 (2부)	2006–2012	The show was discontinued after episode 32 for unknown reasons.
The Lazy Pig	놀고 먹던 꿀꿀이	2006	Remake of the 1969 film.
A Butterfly and a Cock	나비와 수닭	2006	Remake of the 1976 film.
A Boy Defeats Robbers	도적을 쳐부신 소년	2006	Remake of the 1983 film.
Two Friends Drinking Spring Water	샘물을 마신 두동무	2006	
Tong Tong's Story	통통이가 들려준 이야기	2006	
Let's Keep the Traffic Order	교통질서를 잘 지키자요	2006–2023	Updated to 24 episodes. Traffic safety animated series for kids.
A Chodong and Father	초동이와 아버지	2005	
New Friends	새로 사귄 동무	2005	2 episodes.
Mysterious Land	신비한 나라	2004	4 episodes.
A Cat and Kids	야웅이와 꼬마들	2004	
A little Squirrel in Tolbaegol	돌배골의 꼬마 청서	2004	
A story about Bat	박쥐이야기	2004	
A little painter	꼬마화가	2003	North Korea's first computer-generated imagery animation.
Grandpa's Mirror	할아버지가 준 거울	2003	
Three friends in fantasy	환상속의 세 동무	2002	The first 3D animation by SEK Studio.
The Bell	방울소리	1999–2005	7 episodes
The Third's Kind Heart	셋째의 착한 마음	1999	
The Pond Frog of Spring Swamp	샘늪의 참개구리	1999	
Prince Hodong and the Princess of Nakrang	호동왕자와 락랑공주	1990	
Welcome to Pyongyang Festival	평양 축전에 오신걸 환영합니다	1989	Animation on the occasion of 13th World Festival of Youth and Students.
Clever Raccoon Dog	령리한 너구리	1987–2012, 2021–2026	Updated to 90 episodes.
Monkey Brothers	원숭이 형제	1985	
Three Friends	세 동무	1985	
A Winged Horse	날개달린 룡마	1983	
Pencil Bomb	연필 폭탄	1983	Anti-American propaganda.
A Hedgehog Defeats a Tiger	호랑이를 이긴 고슴도치	1983	
A Boy Defeats Robbers	도적을 쳐부신 소년	1983	
Interesting Story	재미있는 이야기	1983	7 episodes
The Boy General	소년장수	1982–1996	50 episodes (1-50)
The Squid's Regret	오징어의 뉘우침	1982	
Brave Honeybee	용감한 꿀벌	1982	2 episodes
Gun Shooters	포쏘기 선수들	1978	
Squirrel and Hedgehog	다람이와 고슴도치 (Series 1)	1977–1982, 1997–2005	26 episodes
Raccoon Dog's Height Measurement	너구리의 높이재기	1976	
A Butterfly and a Cock	나비와 수닭	1976	
Whose Talent is Best?	누구의 재주가 제일 일가?	1976	
Brave Wild Goose	용감한 기러기	1975	
The Rabbit with The Big Ears	귀가 큰 토끼	1974	
Why did the dog cry?	멍멍이는 왜 울었나?	1974	
How Raccoon prepared for winter	너구리의 겨울차비	1974	
A Little Tree and Sudong	애기나무와 수동이	1972	
The Lazy Pig	놀고 먹던 꿀꿀이	1969	
Time Bomb	시한폭탄	1967	Anti-American propaganda.
Pig's Pumpkin Seeds	꿀꿀이의 호박씨	1967	
Burned Squad of Flies	불타버린 쉬팔리 부대	1966	Anti-American propaganda.
The Good Brother	의좋은 형제	1966	
Dog and Cat	멍멍이와 야웅이	1965	
Brother and Sister	오누이	1964	
The Little Flower Pot	작은 화분	1964	
Yawoong caught in fishing	낚시에 걸린 야웅이	1962	
Deer and Tiger	사슴과 호랑이	1962	
Merry Field	흥겨운 들판	1962	
Little Red Star	꼬마붉은별	1961	
Swallow Brothers	제비 삼형제	1961	
The Greedy Pig	욕심많은 돼지	1960	
Our Hill	우리 동산	1959	SEK Studio's first animation.
Blue Spring	파란샘물	2004	
A Gold Nugget and Maize Cakes	황금덩이와 강낭떡		Made sometime in the 80s-90s.
Slug Raccoon	느렁뱅이 너구리		Believed to have been made in the 80s-mid 90s.
Bears' Village and Hares' Village	곰동산과 토끼동산		Made sometime during 1996-2004.

=== Outsourced animations ===
This is a partial list of the works outsourced by SEK Studio.

Title	Year	Notes
Invincible	2024	
Iyanu: Child of Wonder	2024	
Dahlia in Bloom	2024	
Anatane et les enfants d'Okura	2019	Project started on 2006, halted until 2019, Studio SEK credited on first episode, credits removed depending masters.
Bu-Bum! La strada verso casa	2016	With Rai Fiction
Sissi The Young Empress	2016	
Egyxos	2015	With Rai Fiction and Musicartoon
Flower Angel	2014	With Shanghai Taomee Network, Chinese magical girl animated series
Stan Lee's Mighty 7	2014	
Star Key	2014	Italian television animated series, with Gama Movie Animation and Rai Fiction
Le straordinarie avventure di Jules Verne	2013	
Il sogno di Brent	2013	With Rai Fiction and Lucky Dreams
Baskup Tony Parker	2011	French television animated series, with Télé images kids and The Walt Disney Company France
Spike Team	2010	Italian series
Giovanni e Paolo e il Mistero dei Pupi	2010	
Chumballs	2009	
Romance of the Three Kingdoms	2009	Chinese-Japanese co-produced animated series based on the Romance of the Three Kingdoms.
Angel's Friends	2008	Produced by Mondo TV
Avatar: The Last Airbender	2007	Season 3, Episode 1 "The Awakening", outsourced by MOI Animation Studio
Jurassic Cubs	2007	
Padre Pio	2006	
Foot 2 rue	2005	Italian-French series
La cuisine est un jeu d'enfants	2004	French series
The Boy	2003	
The Spaghetti Family	2003	Italian series produced by Mondo TV
Pororo the Little Penguin	2003	Season 1 (26 episodes); credited as Sam-Cheon-Ri
Teenage Mutant Ninja Turtles	2003	Episode 72; uncredited
Raindrop, water is adventure	2002	Produced by Motion Pictures, S.A., TVE, TV3 and TVV
The Bellflower Bunnies	2001	Season 1 (4 episodes)
Lazy Cat Dinga	2001	With Hanaro Telecom; credited as Sam-Cheon-Ri
Prudence Petitpas	2001	
Marcelino Pan y Vino	2001	Japanese series
Bécassine et le Trésor viking	2001	French series
Narigota	2001	
Les enfants de Toromiro	2000	
Les Aventures outre-mer	2000	
La Princesse du Nil	1999	
Sophie's Misfortunes	1998	
Dragon Flyz	1996	French-American television animated series
Princess Sheherazade	1996	
Papa Beaver's Storytime	1993	1999 episodes; credited as Studio SEK
Pocahontas: Princess of the American Indians	1998	Television animated series, produced by Mondo TV, directed by Orlando Corradi
Simba the King Lion	1997	Television animated series, co-produced by Mondo TV
Bamboo Bears	1995	
Davy Crockett	1994	
Les Misérables	1992	
Pif and Hercules	1989	Credited as Studio S.E.K.
Ernest Le Vampire	1989	

=== Film ===
Title	Year	Notes
Futurama: Bender's Big Score	2007	Outsourced by Rough Draft Studios
The Simpsons Movie	2007	Outsourced by Rough Draft Studios
Little Soldier Zhang Ga	2005	
Le petit Wang	2005	
Tentacolino	2004	Produced by Mondo TV
Corto Maltese, la cour secrète des arcanes	2002	
The Legend of the Titanic	1999	Produced by Mondo TV
Gandahar (Light Years)	1988	
How Wang-Fo Was Saved	1987	

== In popular culture ==
Canadian animator and cartoonist Guy Delisle documented his experience working at SEK Studio in his graphic novel, Pyongyang: A Journey in North Korea.

== See also ==
- Korean animation
- List of animation studios
