= Clever Raccoon Dog =

North Korean animated television series

- Opening title card variant for episodes 47-63
- Also known as: The Little Bear
- Hangul: 령리한 너구리
- RR: Ryeongnihan neoguri
- MR: Ryŏngnihan nŏguri
- Genre: Children's television series
- Screenplay by: Kim Gwangsong
- Directed by: Chang Joil
- Composer: Kim Myonghui
- Country of origin: North Korea
- Original language: Korean
- No. of episodes: 88

Production
- Cinematography: Kang Taeyong
- Production company: Korea April 26 Animation Studio

Original release
- Network: Korean Central Television; Manbang
- Release: 1987 – 2026

Clever Raccoon Dog (Korean: 령리한 너구리; Lyeong-lihan Neoguri) is a North Korean children's animated series produced by SEK Studio which first aired on Korean Central Television. The series was produced for a number of years and features both old and new animation styles, depending on the production year of each episode. The series focuses on three main characters (a raccoon dog, a male bear, and a female cat), who are often involved in minor adventures or incidents. Each episode has a scholastic element or a particular message, often times concluding with a moral lesson. The show focuses on matters as scientific information, road safety, sportsmanship, among others. The first 9 episodes (episode 5, 6, 7, 8, 10, 12, 14, 22, 23) are co-produced with the French animation studio Col.Ima.Son and P.M.M.P.

== Characters ==
=== Main characters ===
- Neoguri (너구리, Raccoon Dog): A brown raccoon dog. He is smart and kind.
- Gom (곰, Bear): A brown bear. He is strong and greedy.
- Yaung-i (야웅이, Cat): A blue cat. She is naughty. Her gender is unclear, and even SEK's staff are confused. Although listed as female in international dubs and some DVDs and merchandise, she is considered a "boy" in some episodes. There is no clear answer from the producers about this but it is possible that she is a tomboy.

=== Minor characters ===
- Kkolkkol-i (꼴꼴이, Piglet): He is a mischievous baby pig. He first appeared in episode 65 and is younger than Neoguri, Gom, and Yaungi.
- Mem-me (멤메, Baby Goat): He is Neoguri's classmate.
- Ppiyong-i (삐용이, Chick): He is a baby chick and appeared in episode 47.
- Jangsugom (장수곰/곰삼촌, Uncle Bear): He is Gom's uncle and first appeared in episode 71. He has a job manufacturing canned fish and is attacked and knocked down by hungry wolf thieves.
- Kkangchong-i Annaewon (깡총이 안내원, Guide Rabbit): She is the village guide and reporter, and wears a fancy pink dress. She first appeared in episode 67.
- Yang Ajumeoni (양아주머니, Mrs. Sheep): She is a sheep wearing a light pink dress. She first appeared in episode 70.
- Yeomso Hal-abeoji (염소 할아버지, Mr. Goat)
- Yeou Doduk (여우도둑, Thief Fox): She is a thief who tries to steal a Neoguri's robot crab.
- Keungoyang-i (큰고양이, Captain Lynx): He is a lynx wearing an eyepatch. He tries to steal Neoguri's robot crab with a fox, but ultimately fails.

== Voice cast ==
- Neoguri: Unknown (Episode 1–46) → Song Young-Suk (Episode 47–54) → Rim Bok-Hui (Episode 55) → Song Young-Suk (Episode 56–59) → Rim Bok-Hui (Episode 60–65) → Han Ok-Won (Episode 66-)
- Gom: Unknown (Episode 1–46) → Won Jong-Suk (Episode 47–62) → Rim Un-Yong (Episode 63) → Rim Bok-Hui (Episode 64-)
- Yaungi: Unknown (Episode 1–46) → Kwon Nyong-Ju (Episode 47–55) → Rim Un-Yong (Episode 55–62) → Lee Eun-Ju (Episode 63-)
- Thief Fox: Rim Bok-Hui
- Captain Lynx: Mok Geum-Sung
- Thief Mouse: Dong Yun-Mi
- Pilot Weasel: Park Sung-Il

== Media ==
63 episodes (1-63) have been released on DVD by Mokran Video.

The series resumed in 2021, with episode 64 being aired on 19 December. These newly produced episodes featured new actresses.

On February 4, 2023, The Pyongyang Times announced the production of episodes 70, 71 and 72. These episodes are respectively titled "Orange Necklace", "Waterproof Cloth" and "Plastic Magnet".

== Episodes ==
- English title list is almost written according to formal DVD translation, and asterisk marks mean personal translation, which is because their English names do not exist in it.

No.	Original title	English title	Script	Direction and Conductor	Chief Art Direction	Photograph	Music
1	스키경기	Skiing Match (The Slips)	Kim Gwangsong	Kim Gwangsong	Kim Yongchan	Kang Taeyong	Kim Myonghui
2	높이재기	Measurement of Height	Kim Yongkwon	Rim Hong-un, Chang Joil	In Yonguk	Lee Yongho	Kim Myonghui
3	바람개비	Pinwheel	Kim Gwangsong	Kim Gwangsong, Chang Joil	Chang Yonghwan	Kang Taeyong	Kim Myonghui
4	후보선수	Substitute Player	Chong Songhui	Son Jonggwon, Chang Joil	Kim Yongchol	Ko Byonghwa	Kim Myonghui
5	불을 일으킨 얼음	With the help of ice	Kim Gwanson	Kim Gwanson, Chang Joil	Kim Gwanson	Lee Yongho	Paek Inson
6	장애물경기	An obstacle race	Kim Gwangsong	Kim Gwangsong, Chang Joil	Chong Jonghui	Lee Yonghun	Kim Myonghui
7	순회우승금컵	The circular championship gold cup	Kim Yonggwon	Kim Yongchan, Chang Joil	Kim Taekjon	Han Bonggi	Kim Myonghui
8	지름길	A short cut	Kim Yu-gyong	Kim Gwangsong, Chang Joil	Chong Jonghui	Kim Gilnam	Kim Myonghui
9	축구경기하는 날	The day of football game	Pak Taesul	Kim Yongchan, Chang Joil	Kim Taekjon	Kang Taeyong	Kim Myonghui
10	쫓겨간 호랑이	The tiger takes to flight	Kim Taehong	Kim Gwanson, Hong Sunghak	Kim Gwanson	Lee Yongho	Paek Inson
11	너구리가 준 시계	Raccoon Dog gives a watch*	Lee Gwang-yong	Kim Yongchan, Chang Joil	O Sunnam	Kim Gilnam	Kim Myonghui
12	잘못 안 시간	Mistaken Time	Cha Jeok	Kim Gwanson, Chang Joil	O Gwangsong	Kang Taeyong	Kim Myonghui
13	부정선수	Foul player	Hwang Sok-hwan	Kim Sunhui, Chang Joil	O Sunnam	Lee Yongho	Kim Myonghui
14	응당한 봉변	The deserved humiliation*	Kim Gwanson	Kim Yongchan, Chang Joil	O Gwangsong	Kim Gilnam	Kim Myonghui
15	결승전	The Finals	Kim Yongchan	Kim Yongchan, Chang Joil	Lee Juil	Kang Taeyong	Kim Myonghui
16	야구경기	A baseball game*	Lee In	Lee In, Chang Joil	O Gwangsong	Lee Yongho	Kim Myonghui
17	휘거경기	Figure-skating game	Kim Gwangsong	Kim Gwangsong, Chang Joil	Chong Jonghui	Kim Gilnam	Kim Myonghui
18	랭동차안에서	In a refrigerator car	Kim Gwangsong	Kim Gwangsong, Chang Joil	Kim Inson	Kang Taeyong	Kim Myonghui
19	너구리와 거부기	Raccoon Dog and Turtle	Kim Yonggwon	Kim Gwangsong, Chang Joil	O Gwangsong	Han Yongchol	Kim Myonghui
20	새집들이 하는 날	The day moving into a new house	Kim Yonggwon	Kang Yonghwan, Chang Joil	Kim Inson	Lee Yongho	Kim Myonghui
21	마라손선수	Marathoner	Kim Jun-ok	Kim Jun-ok, Chang Joil	Kim Jun-ok	Kim Gilnam	Kim Myonghui
22	위험한 장난	Dangerous game	Kim Gwanson	Kim Gwanson, Chang Joil	Ro Min	Kang Taeyong	Kim Myonghui
23	바다에서 일어난 소동	Fuss on the sea	Kim Gwanson	Kim Gwanson, Chang Joil	O Gwangsong	Cho Gwangchol	Kim Myonghui
24	야웅이 생일선물	Birthday gift of Cat	Kim Taehong	Kim Yongchan, Hong Sunghak	O Sunnam, Nam Won	Lee Yongho	Kim Myong Hui
25	무차별급 권투경기	Boxing bout (in class without weight distinction)	Kim Taemo	Kim Yongchan, Hong Sunghak	O Sunnam, Lee Juil	Kim Gilnam	Kim Myonghui
26	불을 끈 너구리	Raccoon Dog puts out a fire	Choi Taehyong	Chang Cholsu, Hong Sunghak	Lee Yongil	Han Bonggi	Kim Myonghui
27	유희장에서	At an amusement park*	Chang Cholsu, Pang Sun-yong	Chang Cholsu, Park Mison	Kim Yusong, Kim Gyongho	Lee Yeongho	Kim Myonghui
28	우주려행길에서	At a way of journeying universe*	Kim Gwanson	Kim Gwanson, Park Mison	Kim Yusong, Kim Gyongho	Lee Yongho	Kim Myonghui
29	다시 찾은 황금컵	A gold cup discovered again*	Kim Jun-ok	Kim Jun-ok, Park Mison	Kim Changyu, Chang Yongchol	Kim Gilnam	Kim Myonghui
30	너구리의 빈 화분	Raccoon Dog's empty flowerpot*	Kim Jun-ok	Kim Jun-ok, Park Mison	Paek Hak, Lee Yongil	Kang Taeyong	Kim Myonghui
31	하늘에서의 봉변	A humiliation at the sky*	Ro Sunhui	Chang Cholsu, Park Mison	Kim Sangik, Kim Ryonghyok	Lee Yonghun	Kim Myonghui
32	노없는 배로	With a boat but no paddles*	Lee Jongsun	Son Jonggwon, Park Mison	Chang Yongchol, Mun Song	Han Bonggi	Kim Myonghui
33	그림자탓일가?	Is shadow to blame for it?	Kim Gwanson	Kim Gwanson, Park Mison	Kim Yusong, Chong Hyonchol	Lee Yongho	Kim Myonghui
34	물놀이장에서	At a wading pool	Rim Changgyu	Chang Cholsu, Chang Joil	Choi Ilchan, Paek Yonhui	Kim Jehung	Paek Inson
35	열대림에서 있은일	An event happened in a tropical forest	Kwon Myongson	Kim Gwanson, Chang Joil	Chong Hyonchol, Kim Yusong	Kang Taeyong	Paek Inson
36	위험표식	Danger Indicator	Chang Cholsu	Chang Cholsu, Chang Joil	Kim Inson, Choi Ilchan	Lee Yongho	Paek Inson
37	곰의 그림숙제	Bear's Picture Homework	Kim Jun-ok	Kim Jun-ok, Kim Chol-ui	Lee Yongil, Chang Yongchol	Kim Gilnam	Paek Inson
38	욕심많은 곰	Greedy Bear	O su-nam	Chang Cholsu, Kim Chol-ui	Kim Gwanghyok	Lee Yonghun	Paek Inson
39	남극에서 온 펭긴선수	Penguin, an ice-skating player from the Antarctic	Kim Jusin	Kim Yongchan, Kim Chol-ui	O sunnam, Son Yongsam	Han Bonggi	Paek Inson
40	누구의 발자국일가?	Whose footprint is it?	Chang Cholsu	Chang Cholsu, Pak Mison	Kim Gwanghyok, Kim Dok-yong	Kim Jehung	Paek Inson
41	너구리의 과일농사	Racoon Dog grows fruit	Kim Jun-ok	Kim Gwanghyok, Chang Myongil	Yun Jusong, Paek Hak	Kang Taeyong	Paek Inson
42	힘을 겨루는 경기	Strength Contest	Kim Jun-ok	Ro Min	An Chundong, O Songnam	Lee Yongho	Paek Inson
43	없어진 어항의 물	A fish globe drained	Kim Gwanson	Kim Gwanson, Pak Mison	O Gwangsong	Lee Yonghun	Paek Inson
44	물스키경기 하는 날	The day of water ski game*	Chang Myonghui	Kim Gwanson, Hong Sunghak	Hong Jongchol, Son Chol-o	Kim Gilnam	Kim Yongsong
45	너구리가 감춘 남비	Raccoon Dog hides a pot*	Yun Hyonhui	Chang Cholsu, Chang Myongil	Chang Yongchol, Ryu Sejong	Kim Solnam	Paek Inson
46	언사과	Ice cold apples*	Kim Jun-ok, Sin Cholgyun	Kim Jun-ok, Kim Sandong	Paek Hak, Cho Gwangchol	Han Bonggi	Yun Jongho
47	렬차안에서	In the subway*	Lee Jonghwa	Kim Gwangsong, Lee Sokhun, Chong Il-yong	Lee Dongchol, Kim Gwanghyop	Lee Yonghun	Paek Inson
48	꿀단지에 비낀 두 모습	Two images reflected in a honey jar*	Pang Sun-yong	Kim Jun-ok, Son Chol-o, Chong Il-yong	O Songchol, Kim Chol-ung	Kim Sunho	Paek Inson
49	바다가에서 있은 일	An event happened in the sea*	Kim Suhwa	Kim Jun-ok, Pak Gwanghyon, Chong Il-yong	Mun Changil, Kim Ungho	Kim Gilnam	Paek Inson
50	야웅이가 받은 꽃다발	Cat receives a bouquet*	Kim Jun-ok, Kim Suhwa	Pak Gyongsu, Chong Il-yong	Ryu Sejong, Lee Yongil	Nam Gyongsu	Paek Inson
51	열대섬동산에서 있은 일	An event happened on the hillock of a tropical island*	Choi Insong	Kim Yongchan, Ro Min, Chong Il-yong	Ryu Sejong, Mun Changil	Kim Jehung	Paek Inson
52	너구리가 만든 잠망경	Raccoon Dog makes a periscope*	Kim Jun-ok, Om Sunhui	O Sinhyok, Ham Chun-il, Chong Il-yong	Kim Inchol, Han Chol	Kim Sunho	Chong Byongchol
53	힘겨루기 날에 있은 일	On the Day of Tug-of-War Game	Kim Yongchan	Yun Yonggil, Kim Sandong	Hong Yongnam, Pak Sunggu		Kim Myonghui
54	다시 날린 전파	A re-transmitted radio wave*	Kim Hyonchol	O Sinhyok, Yun Yonggil, Lee Jongdu	Hong Yongnam, Chang Nampa		Paek Inson
55	너구리가 가져온 물	Raccoon Dog brings a water*	Hwang Duman	O Sinhyok, Ho Sanghyok	Hong Yongnam, Han Chol		Paek Inson
56	너구리가 올린 돛	Raccoon Dog hoists a sail*	Choi Insong	Kye Hun, Ryo Myonggi	Lee Songjin, Choi Yuil, Cho Jongchol		Paek Inson
57	새 려객선에서	On the new passenger ship*	Son Gangho	Kim Yongchan, Lee Chol, Ryo Myonggi	Kim Wonil, Cho Jongchol		Paek Inson
58	흰눈동산에서	On the hillock covered with white snow*	Ho Ungyong	Kim Hyokchol, Chang Myongil	Kim Songjun		Kim Myonghui
59	수림산에서 있은 일	An event happened on Mt.Surim*	Lee Yongchun	Kye Hun, Ryo Myonggi	Hong Yongnam		Kim Myonghui
60	은빛행성에서	In a silver planet*	Yun Choljin	Kim Hyokchol, Ryo Myonggi			Kim Myonghui
61	너구리가 만든 안경	Raccoon Dog makes a glasses*	Kim Hwasong	O Sinhyok, Lee Byong-ui			Kim Myonghui
62	누구의 작간일가	Whose trick is it?*	Choi Taehyong	O Sinhyok, Ryo Myonggi			Kim Myonghui
63	못가에서 있은 일	An event happened around a pool*	Song Chun-ok	Kim Songjun, Chang Myongil			Kim Myonghui
64	만능저울	General-purpose Balance	Ri Yong-chun	Kim Chin-hyok	Kim Won-il		Kim Myonghui, Kim Un-hui
65	새둥지	Bird's nest*	Kim Hwa-song	Kim Chol-hyon	Ho Chon-hyok		Kim Myonghui, Kim Song-hui
66	라침판	Compass	Ho Chong-yon, Kim Ju-won	Son Un-nam	Kim Won-il		Kim Myong-hui, In Yu-chol
67	요술옷		Ri Pong-hwa	Kim Chin-hyok	Ho Chon-hyok		Kim Myong-hui, Kim Un-hui

== Reception ==
The series was aired in South Korea in the early 2000s by South Korean public broadcasters SBS and EBS under the original name, as well as on KBS under the title "Raccoon and Forest Friends" (너구리와 숲속 친구들) due to the Sunshine Policy which eased restrictions on North Korean media and promoted inter-Korean cooperation notably fields of culture and art. Due to the show's little to no propaganda, it is one of the few North Korean programmes that do not violate the National Security Act.

The show has also been exported to other countries and dubbed in different languages, notably in Afrikaans, Arabic, Bulgarian, English and Italian. Mondo TV handled the English translation, with the series localized as The Little Bear which is not to be confused with the Little Bear series of books.

== Philately ==
On June 21, 1989, North Korea issued three postage stamps, dedicated to Measurement of Height, an episode of the series.
