= Immortal Love =

Immortal Love may refer to:

- Immortal Love (film), a 1961 Japanese drama film
- "Immortal Love" (song), a 2025 single by Mika
