= Hyperlove =

Studio album by Mika
- Released: 23 January 2026
- Recorded: 2023–2025
- Studios: Republic Records (Los Angeles, New York); Planet (Montreal); Sam (Lari)
- Genres: Pop; electropop; synth-pop; dance
- Length: 44:36
- Label: Republic
- Producers: Mika; Nicholas Littlemore

Mika chronology
Que ta tête fleurisse toujours (2023)	Hyperlove (2026)

Singles from Hyperlove
- 1. "Modern Times" Released: 31 October 2025; 2. "Immortal Love" Released: 5 December 2025; 3. "Excuses for Love" Released: 23 January 2026; 4. "Spinning Out" Released: 23 January 2026

Hyperlove is the seventh studio album by British singer-songwriter Mika. It was released on 23 January 2026 through Republic Records. The album was primarily written by Mika, and is his first English language album since My Name Is Michael Holbrook (2019). Mika collaborated with Nick Littlemore, who had previously worked on the singer's album The Origin of Love (2012), and Peter Mayes on production. The album is a pop record, which incorporates sounds of electropop, synth-pop and dance. Lyrically, Hyperlove explores what it means to love amid the "struggles and disillusionment" of the modern world.

Two singles preceded the release of Hyperlove; the lead single, "Modern Times", was released on 31 October 2025, followed by the second single, "Immortal Love", on 5 December 2025. The album's third and fourth singles, "Excuses for Love" and "Spinning Out", were released simultaneously alongside the album on 23 January 2026.

Hyperlove received generally positive reviews from music critics, who praised the album's production and lyrical content, though some criticism was aimed at a perceived lack of originality. Commercially, the album debuted at number 14 on the UK Albums Chart, Mika's highest entry in the country since The Boy Who Knew Too Much (2009). To promote the album, Mika embarked on the Spinning Out Tour, with shows in Europe throughout February and March 2026, and a North American leg taking place between April and May 2026.

== Background ==
In an interview with Rolling Stone magazine in January 2026, Mika stated: "I was created by the UK, but 100 per cent I went away" when discussing his lack of commercial visibility in the United Kingdom following his 2009 album The Boy Who Knew Too Much, in favour of markets that "embraced him more warmly". He explained how a turning point came when he signed up to be a judge on the British music competition show The Piano (2023), describing it as "completely [reconnecting] me with the UK, and not just London, because we film in different cities: Glasgow, Leeds, Cardiff". In the same interview, he described his intentions as being to "make alternative experimental pop" and not "music that plays in the aisles of Lidl", while acknowledging that "if that happens, it's brilliant, but I'm not fighting for that space".

Speaking to Roisin O'Connor of The Independent that same month, Mika likened "writing at the piano" to "chasing a state of euphoria", which helped to conceive Hyperlove. He described the album's title as a "state of loving in the modern age" and "that feeling we chase when we're writing songs – about desire, the celebration of having it and wanting more".

The album's press release describes Hyperlove as "reinvention" for Mika, highlighting his "joyous return to the piano as his creative compass", and explains the concept of the album as being "a forward-looking exploration of how human emotion can coexist with the accelerating velocity of the digital world". Further, it mentions that Hyperlove emerged after the loss of his mother, Joannie Penniman, in 2020, and the presence of his "beloved golden retriever", both of whose "influence is felt across the record". Elaborating on the album's writing process, Mika stated: "I went back to my piano: this hyper-complicated, gloriously mechanical machine that lets me make any kind of music. The entire album had to be written there. I decided I would co-write it with the piano… and trust the chaos."

== Composition ==
Hyperlove is a pop album, which also incorporates sounds of electropop, synth-pop, and dance. Lyrically, the album explores the "struggles and disillusionment of modernity", and "radical emotional honesty in a world that encourages restraint". The album reunites Mika with Nick Littlemore, who had previously worked on the singer's 2012 album The Origin of Love. Mika intended for the project to have a production style which he described as "[having] come from analogue or vintage outboard gear. Nothing quantized. Nothing perfectly in tune".

== Promotion ==
=== Singles ===
"The song for me is like a treadmill, and that treadmill is life, life in all its good and all its bad. As time goes on and life gets more confusing and sometimes overwhelming, we look further than the world around us, into the world of mythology, desire and dreams."

— Mika, on "Modern Times"

The album's lead single "Modern Times" was released on 31 October 2025, alongside its music video, which was directed by Rupert Höller. Mika described the track as "a cathedral-like cry for faith and spirit, resisting the grind and weight of life and the passing of time".

The second single, "Immortal Love", was released on 5 December 2025, followed by its music video two weeks later on 19 December 2025, which was directed by Nick Bartleet. The song is dedicated to Mika's dog, a 16-year-old golden retriever named Melachi, with the singer stating on an Instagram post: "16 years by my side. It was about time she had her own song." The track reached number 27 on the UK Airplay Chart in January 2026.

The album's third and fourth singles, "Excuses for Love" and "Spinning Out", were released simultaneously with the album on 23 January 2026, with the latter being serviced to radio in Italy that same day. "Excuses for Love" has been described as "a euphoric, bass-driven single that captures the heart of Hyperlove's message: radical emotional honesty in a world that encourages restraint".

=== Live performances ===
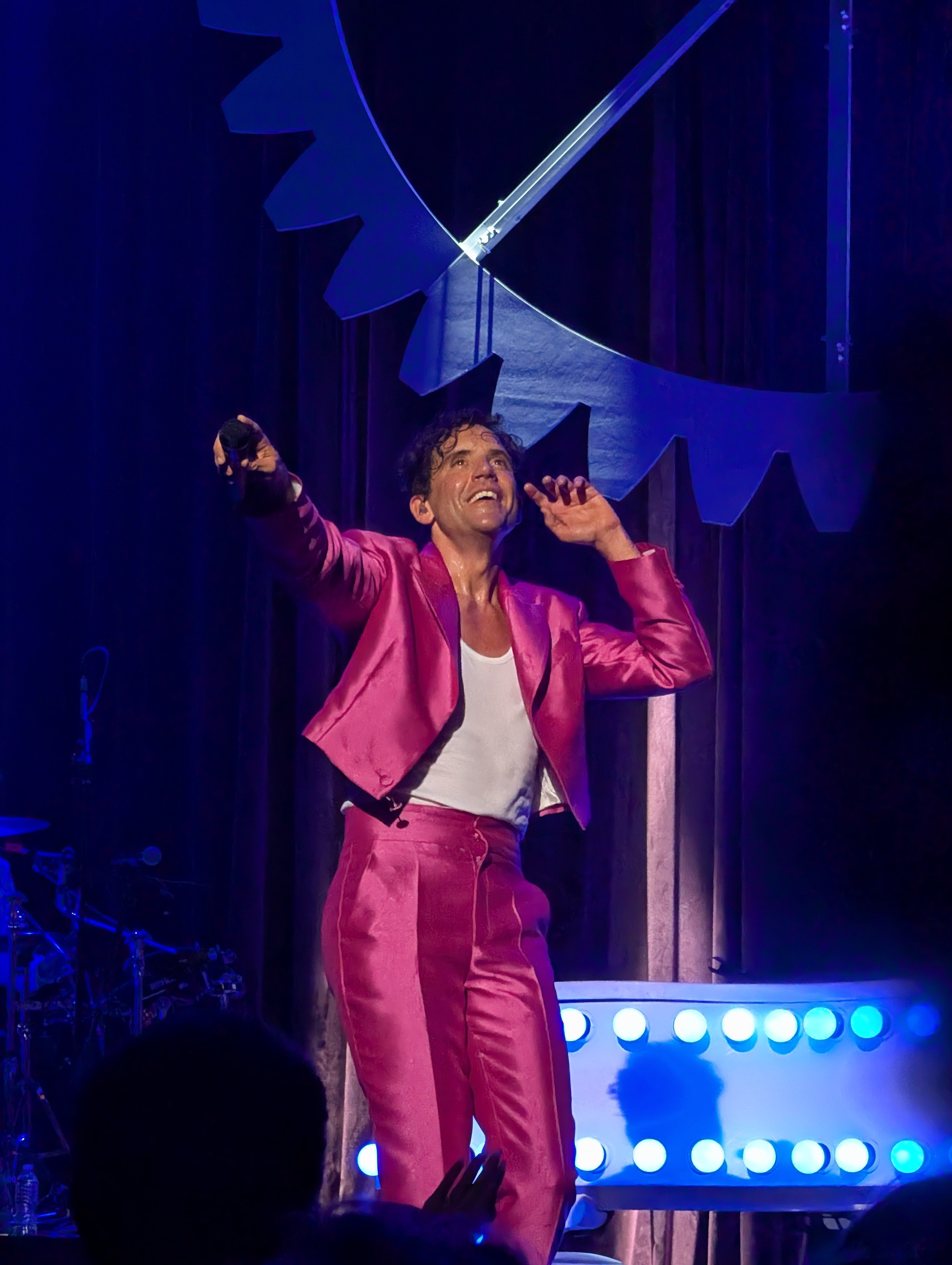
Mika performing on the Spinning Out Tour in 2026

To support the release, Mika announced a series of in-store talks and stripped-back performances across the United Kingdom during the album's release week. The appearances took place at record stores, including Banquet Records in Kingston on 26 January, Jacaranda Records in Liverpool on January 28, Assai Records in Glasgow on 29 January, and HMV in Birmingham on 30 January.

Mika embarked on a concert tour, titled the Spinning Out Tour, with the European leg of shows taking place between February and March 2026, and the North American leg between April and May 2026. The European leg included his biggest ever headline shows, at the OVO Arena Wembley in London, and the AO Arena in Manchester. Additionally, he headlined multiple festivals in June and July 2026, including Depot Live at Cardiff Castle on 12 June, On The Mount in Reading on 26 June, Eden Sessions at the Eden Project in Cornwall on 12 July, and Summer Nights At The Bandstand in Glasgow on 29 July.

== Critical reception ==
Professional ratings
Review scores
Source	Rating
Attitude	4/5 stars
Buzz Magazine	4/5 stars
Erazer Magazine	3/5 stars
Het Nieuwsblad	3/5 stars
Jenesaispop	3/5 stars
Northern Exposure	5/5 stars
RIFF Magazine	9/10
The Scotsman	2/5 stars
The Times	3/5 stars

Writing for Attitude magazine, Nick Levine gave Hyperlove four out of five stars, describing the project as a "triumph", and highlighted the tracks "Take Your Problems with You" and "Modern Love" as standouts, noting that the former sounds like "a breezy evening in Nice", and the latter as being "deliciously camp". He concluded that "it feels great to have [Mika] back". Megan Philip of Buzz magazine gave the album four out of five stars, describing the project as being an "energetic synth-filled examination of love in the modern world", and favourably compared the tracks "Nicotine" and "Bells" to the sound of Mika's 2007 album Life In Cartoon Motion. She concluded that the album "signals the beginning of a new era for Mika" that is "driven by high-energy dance anthems". Talia M. Wilson of Riff magazine gave the album a score of 9/10, describing the project as "experimental" and "nostalgic new wave". Wilson praised the "stellar" piano work on tracks such as "Hyperlove" and "Spinning Out", describing the former as being "reminiscent of Coldplay with a touch of Enya".

Writing for The Times, Will Hodgkinson described Mika as pursuing "a Eurodisco style that's completely out of step with modern trends" on Hyperlove, which "marks him out as his own man". However, he noted that the singer "never came up with anything quite as good" since his debut with "Grace Kelly" (2007), and that "the problem continues with Hyperlove". Hodgkinson concluded that the album is "nothing to frighten the horses", but a "likeable dive into innocent, shimmering pop nonetheless". Fiona Shepherd of The Scotsman described Mika as "far more subdued" on Hyperlove while comparing the project unfavourably to the maximalist "Grace Kelly" and "Love Today" (2007). Shepherd felt that Mika was "coasting along" on the album despite being a talented musician and the album title suggesting elevated emotions. Writing for Het Nieuwsblad, Guy Stevens praised Mika's vocals on Hyperlove, and the dance-able nature of the album - highlighting the tracks "Nicotine" and "Bells" as standouts. Stevens wrote that at times the album's tracks "occasionally threaten to sound a bit similar to one another", and suggested that we are yet to see "everything Mika has to offer". In a review for Jenesaispop, Sebas E. Alonso criticised the interludes on the album, describing them as sounding like "complete but poorly developed songs" that seem "out of place" on the project. He praised "Immortal Love" and "Nicotine", highlighting the electro-pop genre of the former as suiting Mika "the best", and the "pop-rock" production of the latter as Fleetwood Mac-esque.

The Times included Hyperlove on their '10 best new tracks and albums' list while Rolling Stone included the album on their '6 albums you need to hear' list, for the release week ending 23 January 2026. Additionally, Record Store Day UK named Hyperlove their album of the month for January 2026, describing the project as "packed with playful interludes and little surprises, [Hyperlove] moves effortlessly, drawing you in from start to finish".

== Commercial performance ==
In the United Kingdom, Hyperlove debuted at number 14 on the UK Albums Chart, moving 5,108 album-equivalent units in its first week. In Scotland, the album debuted at number four on the Scottish Albums Chart. In both countries, the album became Mika's highest-charting project since The Boy Who Knew Too Much (2009).

Hyperlove debuted at number fifteen in Switzerland, and number nine in the Romandie region of the country. In Belgium, the album reached number four in the Wallonia region, where it spent 10 weeks on the chart, and number 21 in the Flanders region. In France, the album debuted at number ten, selling 4,200 copies in its first week, and became Mika's seventh consecutive top ten album in the country. It spent six weeks on the French albums chart. Elsewhere, the album reached number 37 on the Croatian International Albums chart, number 41 on the Spanish Vinyl Albums chart, and number 98 in Italy. In the United States, the album reached number 30 on the Top Current Album Sales chart.

== Track listing ==
Hyperlove track listing
No.	Title	Writer(s)	Length
1.	"Hyperlove"	Mika	3:00
2.	"Modern Times"	Mika	4:27
3.	"Spinning Out"	Mika	3:22
4.	"Excuses for Love"	Mika	3:04
5.	"Interlude Everything's Beautiful"	Mika; Littlemore	1:48
6.	"All the Same"	Mika	3:23
7.	"Dreams"	Mika; Renaud Rebillaud	2:49
8.	"Science Fiction Lover"	Mika; Mathieu Jomphe Lépine; Roland Orzabal	3:43
9.	"Take Your Problems with You"	Mika; Amy Wadge; Rebillaud	2:52
10.	"Interlude Please Take Your Problems with You"	Mika; Littlemore	1:17
11.	"Nicotine"	Mika	4:06
12.	"Eleven"	Mika	3:18
13.	"Bells"	Mika	2:56
14.	"Interlude Immortal Dream"	Mika; Littlemore	1:29
15.	"Immortal Love"	Mika	2:56
Total length:			44:36

=== Note ===
- "Science Fiction Lover" contains portions of "Mad World", written by Roland Orzabal and performed by Tears for Fears.

== Personnel ==
Credits adapted from the album's liner notes.

=== Musicians ===
- Mika – vocals (tracks 1–5, 7–9, 11–13, 15), piano (1–3), organ (2)
- Reuben James – synthesizers (1–4, 6, 9, 11, 12, 15), piano (2), background vocals (6, 11), additional synthesizers (7), vocoder (11)
- Alex Stacey – additional background vocals (1, 2), background vocals (4, 6, 8, 11, 12), programming (1), synthesizers (12), synth bass (15)
- Justus West – electric guitar (1, 11), acoustic guitar (1), guitar (2, 10, 13); Yamaha CS-80, additional guitar, additional bass (11)
- Donnie Sloan – bass (1, 8), Yamaha CS-80 (1), synthesizer (7), guitar (8)
- Kevin Brunhober – cymbals (1)
- Milan Beker – saxophone (1)
- Ethan Cohen – additional synthesizers (1)
- Kyle Poole – percussion (2–6, 9–12, 14), drums (2–4, 6, 9, 11, 12), synthesizers (5, 10, 14), background vocals (6)
- Dom Dias – additional programming (2, 12), programming (3, 5, 6, 10, 11, 13, 14), synthesizers (6)
- Ida Falk Winland – background vocals (2, 7, 9, 14, 15)
- Clement Langlois-Legare – acoustic guitar (2)
- Tim Van Der Kuil – guitars (3, 4, 6, 9, 11, 12, 15)
- Peter Randall – bass (4, 6, 9, 11, 12, 15)
- Atillio Troiano – horns, horns arrangement (4)
- Juno Sloan – bass (5, 10, 11), guitar (5, 10), electric guitar (11)
- Reuben Fox – EWI (5, 10, 14)
- Brad Bowers – bass (5, 10)
- John Waters – narration (5, 14)
- Nicky Muroch – guitar (7, 10), additional guitars (15)
- Nicholas Semrad – keyboards (7, 13)
- Shaan Ramaprasad – strings (7), church bells (13)
- Alex Carapetis – drums (7)
- Renaud Rebillaud – vocals (7)
- Rob Christie – acoustic guitar (8)
- Adam Marcello – drums (9), cymbals (11), additional drums (12)
- Devin Daniels – horns (10)
- Ryan Porter – horns (10)
- Yakiv Tsvietinskyi – horns (10)
- Taran Lockett – percussion (10)
- Steven Bach – synthesizers (10)

=== Technical and visuals ===
- Nicholas Littlemore – production
- Mika – production
- Peter Mayes – additional production (2–4, 6, 8, 15)
- Alex Stacey – engineering
- Jake Prein – engineering (1, 4, 5, 7, 8, 11, 13–15)
- Raffaele Stefani – engineering (2–7, 9–15)
- Daniel Cinelli – engineering (2, 3, 12, 15)
- Marc-Antoine Joly – engineering (3, 15)
- Roy Hendrickson – engineering (5, 10, 14)
- Massimo Barbieri – engineering (13)
- Renaud Rebillaud – additional vocal engineering (7)
- Serban Ghenea – mixing
- John Hanes – Dolby Atmos mixing
- Bryce Bordone – mix engineering
- Mark Crew – pre-mix (7)
- Chris Gehringer – mastering (1, 3–15)
- Randy Merrill – mastering (2)
- Alex Black – photography, photo art direction
- Thierry-Maxime Loriot – photo creative direction
- Mat Maitland – design, packaging

== Charts ==
Chart performance for Hyperlove
Chart (2026)	Peak position
Belgian Albums (Ultratop Flanders)	21
Belgian Albums (Ultratop Wallonia)	4
Croatian International Albums (HDU)	37
French Albums (SNEP)	10
Italian Albums (FIMI)	98
Scottish Albums (Official Charts)	4
Spanish Vinyl Albums (Promusicae)	41
Swiss Albums (Schweizer Hitparade)	15
Swiss Albums (Romandie)	9
UK Albums (Official Charts)	14
US Top Current Album Sales (Billboard)	30
