= No Place in Heaven =

Studio album by Mika
- Released: 15 June 2015
- Recorded: 2013–2015
- Genre: Pop
- Length: 38:39
- Labels: Republic; Casablanca
- Producers: Greg Wells; Mika; David Sneddon; Martin Terefe; Starsmith; Tim van der Kuil; James Baeur-Mein; Gustave Rudman; Verrigni

Mika chronology
The Origin of Love (2012)	No Place in Heaven (2015)	My Name Is Michael Holbrook (2019)

Singles from No Place in Heaven
- 1. "Boum Boum Boum" Released: 11 June 2014; 2. "Talk About You" Released: 31 March 2015; 3. "Last Party" Released: 8 April 2015; 4. "Good Guys" Released: 25 May 2015; 5. "Staring at the Sun" Released: 31 July 2015; 6. "Hurts" Released: 29 January 2016

No Place in Heaven is the fourth studio album by British singer-songwriter Mika, released on 15 June 2015 via Republic Records (Casablanca).

== Background and recording ==
After his first two records were described as campy affairs, Mika's third release The Origin of Love marked a drastic shift in musical style for the songwriter. No Place in Heaven continues that evolution. Mika described the recording process in an interview with Out Magazine: "I formed a little design studio with my sister and started drawing again like we used to in the kitchen of my mother's house. I was basically liberating myself and making my brain work very hard—scaring myself with challenges. As a result, the album is direct, low-down, open, candid, playful, yet a mature pop album which takes its inspiration from '60s pop music, very much the way my first album did."

Shortly after the record was officially confirmed, the songs "Talk About You" and "Last Party" were released. The latter song is an homage to late Queen frontman Freddie Mercury.

== Singles ==
"Talk About You" was released as the album's lead single. It was released to digital retailers on 31 March and the music video premiered on 27 April 2015.

Music videos for "Last Party," "Good Guys" and "Staring at the Sun" were released on 8 April, 25 May and 31 July respectively.

The video for "Last Party" featured Mika singing directly into the camera and was filmed in black and white by famed fashion photographer Peter Lindbergh.

The song "Hurts" was remixed into an electro-pop version and appears on the November 2015 French reissue of No Place In Heaven as the 17th track, and on the Italian reissue as the 18th track. This version was released in Italy as a single first played on radio on 29 January 2016. It was also featured in the 2016 Italian film Un Bacio. A music video featuring Mika and three of the film's stars was released in February 2016. Both versions of the song appear on the film's soundtrack release.

=== Deluxe edition ===
On 13 November 2015 the album was re-released in the form of a double-disc deluxe edition, containing a number of bonus tracks on Disc 1 as well as a full-length orchestral bonus disc, which includes a performance by MIKA with L'Orchestre Symphonique De Montreal.

This version of the album has currently only been released in France, Canada and Italy. The French edition uses the original French track listing of the album, as well as containing five bonus tracks, including a remix of "Hurts", three new songs (including French-language track "Je Chante"), and a French version of "Staring at the Sun".

The Italian edition uses the original English track listing of the album, as well as containing six bonus tracks, including "Boum Boum Boum" (which had not previously been released in the country), the "Hurts" remix, three new songs (including Italian-language track "Center of Gravity"), a bonus Italian version of one of the new songs as well as "Porcelain".

== Commercial performance ==
In the United Kingdom, the album debuted at number 19, and lasted three weeks on the charts with sales of 15,000, improving on the sales of The Origin of Love. It also debuted at number six in Canada and number 117 in the United States. The album had more success in France, where it debuted and peaked at number two, lasting 54 weeks on the charts with more than 140,000 sales, earning a platinum award, and in Italy, where it debuted at number 3 and lasted 53 weeks with more than 55,000 sales, also earning a platinum award there.

The album was also a success in other parts of Europe, including in Switzerland, where it reached number four, in Wallonia, where it reached number three and in Flanders, where it reached number 9. The album also charted in Spain, Netherlands, Austria, Germany, Croatia, Ireland, the Czech Republic, Lithuania and Latvia. The album peaked at number 33 in Japan and debuted at number 10 in South Korea.

== Track listing ==
Standard edition
No.	Title	Writer(s)	Producer(s)	Length
1.	"Talk About You"	Michael Penniman Jr.; Johan Carlsson; Ross Golan; Danio Farina; Enzo Ghinazzi; Daniele Pace; Mike Hawker; Ivor Raymond	Greg Wells; Mika	3:23
2.	"All She Wants"	Penniman Jr.; David Sneddon; James Baeur-Mein	Wells; Mika; Martin Terefe^{[a]}	3:39
3.	"Last Party"	Penniman Jr.; Matthew Hales; Teemu Brunila	Wells; Mika	3:39
4.	"Good Guys"	Penniman Jr.; Skyler Stonestreet	Mika; Tim Van der Kuil	3:23
5.	"Oh Girl You're the Devil"	Penniman Jr.; Clarence Coffee Jr.; Greg Wells	Wells; Mika	2:51
6.	"No Place in Heaven"	Penniman Jr.; Coffee Jr; Rob Wells	Wells; Mika	3:20
7.	"Staring at the Sun"	Penniman Jr.; Wayne Hector; Benny Benassi; Alle Benassi	Terefe; Starsmith^{[a]}	3:35
8.	"Hurts"	Penniman Jr.; Sneddon; Baeur-Mein	Sneddon; Baeur-Mein; Mika	3:37
9.	"Good Wife"	Penniman Jr.; Sneddon; Baeur-Mein	Sneddon; Baeur-Mein; Mika; Wells^{[a]}	3:18
10.	"Rio"	Penniman Jr.; Nina Woodford; Jarad Kritzstein; Kerry Brothers Jr	Wells; Mika	4:08
11.	"Ordinary Man"	Penniman Jr.; Stonestreet; Gustave Rudman	Rudman; Mika; Wells^{[a]}	3:46

Deluxe edition
No.	Title	Writer(s)	Producer(s)	Length
12.	"Promiseland" (bonus track)	Penniman Jr.; Stonestreet; Christopher J Baran	Wells; Mika	2:59
13.	"Porcelain" (bonus track)	Penniman Jr.; Brunila; Jori Sjoroos; Joe Khadajourian; Alex Schwartz	Brunila; Mika	3:19
14.	"Good Guys" (Night Time Mix) (bonus track)	Penniman Jr.; Stonestreet		3:37
15.	"L'amour fait ce qu'il veut" (bonus track)	Penniman Jr.; Doriand	Mika	3:25

French edition
No.	Title	Writer(s)	Producer(s)	Length
1.	"Talk About You"	Penniman Jr.; Carlsson; Golan; Farina; Ghinazzi; Pace; Hawker; Raymond	Wells; Mika	3:23
2.	"Good Guys"	Penniman Jr.; Stonestreet	Mika; Van der Kuil	3:23
3.	"L'amour fait ce qu'il veut"	Penniman Jr.; Doriand	Mika	3:25
4.	"All She Wants"	Penniman Jr.; Sneddon; Baeur-Mein	Wells; Mika; Terefe^{[a]}	3:39
5.	"Last Party"	Penniman Jr.; Hales; Brunila	Wells; Mika	3:39
6.	"Les Baisers perdus"	Penniman Jr.; Doriand	Mika	2:45
7.	"No Place in Heaven"	Penniman Jr.; Coffee Jr; Rob Wells	Wells; Mika	3:20
8.	"Staring at the Sun"	Penniman Jr.; Hector; Benny Benassi; Alle Benassi	Terefe; Starsmith^{[a]}	3:35
9.	"Hurts"	Penniman Jr.; Sneddon; Baeur-Mein	Sneddon; Baeur-Mein; Mika	3:37
10.	"Boum Boum Boum"	Penniman Jr.; Doriand	Klas Ahlund; Van der Kuil	3:18
11.	"Good Wife"	Penniman Jr.; Sneddon; Baeur-Mein	Sneddon; Baeur-Mein; Mika; Wells^{[a]}	3:18
12.	"J'ai pas envie"	Penniman Jr.; Doriand	Wells; Mika	3:02
13.	"Oh Girl You're the Devil"	Penniman Jr.; Coffee Jr; Greg Wells	Wells; Mika	2:51
14.	"Ordinary Man"	Penniman Jr.; Stonestreet; Rudman	Rudman; Mika; Wells^{[a]}	3:46

French limited deluxe edition
No.	Title	Writer(s)	Producer(s)	Length
15.	"Rio" (bonus track)	Mika; Woodford; Kritzstein; Brothers Jr	Wells; Mika	4:08
16.	"Promiseland" (bonus track)	Mika; Stonestreet; Baran	Wells; Mika	2:59
17.	"Porcelain" (bonus track)	Mika; Brunila; Sjoroos; Khadajourian; Schwartz	Brunila; Mika	3:19

French edition (Disc 1)
No.	Title	Writer(s)	Producer(s)	Length
1.	"Talk About You"	Mika; Carlsson; Golan; Farina; Ghinazzi; Pace; Hawker; Raymond	Wells; Mika	3:23
2.	"Good Guys"	Mika; Stonestreet	Mika; Van der Kuil	3:23
3.	"L'amour fait ce qu'il veut"	Mika; Doriand	Mika	3:25
4.	"All She Wants"	Mika; Sneddon; Baeur-Mein	Wells; Mika; Terefe^{[a]}	3:39
5.	"Last Party"	Mika; Hales; Brunila	Wells; Mika	3:39
6.	"Les Baisers perdus"	Mika; Doriand	Mika	2:45
7.	"No Place in Heaven"	Mika; Coffee Jr; Rob Wells	Wells; Mika	3:20
8.	"Staring at the Sun"	Mika; Hector; Benny Benassi; Alle Benassi	Terefe; Starsmith^{[a]}	3:35
9.	"Hurts"	Mika; Sneddon; Baeur-Mein	Sneddon; Baeur-Mein; Mika	3:37
10.	"Boum Boum Boum"	Mika; Doriand	Klas Ahlund; Van der Kuil	3:18
11.	"Good Wife"	Mika; Sneddon; Baeur-Mein	Sneddon; Baeur-Mein; Mika; Wells^{[a]}	3:18
12.	"J'ai pas envie"	Mika; Doriand	Wells; Mika	3:02
13.	"Oh Girl You're the Devil"	Mika; Coffee Jr; Greg Wells	Wells; Mika	2:51
14.	"Ordinary Man"	Mika; Stonestreet; Rudman	Rudman; Mika; Wells^{[a]}	3:46
15.	"Je chante"			2:47
16.	"Tant que j'ai le soleil" (Staring at the Sun - French Version)	Mika; Hector; Benny Benassi; Alle Benassi	Terefe; Starsmith^{[a]}	3:35
17.	"Hurts" (Nexus Remix)	Mika; Sneddon; Baeur-Mein	Sneddon; Baeur-Mein; Mika	3:25
18.	"Beautiful Disaster"			3:42
19.	"Feels Like Love"			3:04

Italian edition (Disc 1)
No.	Title	Writer(s)	Producer(s)	Length
1.	"All She Wants"	Mika; Sneddon; Baeur-Mein	Wells; Mika; Terefe^{[a]}	3:39
2.	"Talk About You"	Mika; Carlsson; Golan; Farina; Ghinazzi; Pace; Hawker; Raymond	Wells; Mika	3:23
3.	"Last Party"	Mika; Hales; Brunila	Wells; Mika	3:39
4.	"Good Guys"	Mika; Stonestreet	Mika; Tim Van der Kuil	3:23
5.	"Oh Girl You're the Devil"	Mika; Coffee Jr; Wells	Wells; Mika	2:51
6.	"No Place in Heaven"	Mika; Coffee Jr; Wells	Wells; Mika	3:20
7.	"Staring at the Sun"	Mika; Hector; B. Benassi; A. Benassi	Terefe; Starsmith^{[a]}	3:35
8.	"Hurts"	Mika; Sneddon; Baeur-Mein	Sneddon; Baeur-Mein; Mika	3:37
9.	"Good Wife"	Mika; Sneddon; Baeur-Mein	Sneddon; Baeur-Mein; Mika; Wells^{[a]}	3:18
10.	"Rio"	Mika; Woodford; Kritzstein; Brothers Jr.	Wells; Mika	4:08
11.	"Ordinary Man"	Mika; Stonestreet; Rudman	Rudman; Mika; Wells^{[a]}	3:46
12.	"Promiseland"	Mika; Stonestreet; Baran	Wells; Mika	2:59
13.	"Porcelain"	Mika; Brunila; Sjoroos; Khadajourian; Schwartz	Brunila; Mika	3:19
14.	"L'amour fait ce qu'il veut"	Mika; Doriand	Mika	3:25
15.	"Boum Boum Boum"	Mika; Doriand	Ahlund; Van der Kuil	3:18
16.	"Beautiful Disaster" (featuring Fedez) (Italian version)			3:42
17.	"Center of Gravity" (featuring Franco Battiato)			4:03
18.	"Hurts" (Nexus Remix)	Mika; Sneddon; Baeur-Mein	Sneddon; Baeur-Mein; Mika	3:25
19.	"Feels Like Love"			3:04
20.	"Beautiful Disaster"			3:42

Disc 2: Mika with L'Orchestre Symphonique De Montreal
No.	Title	Length
1.	"Toy Boy"	4:05
2.	"Grace Kelly"	3:20
3.	"Underwater"	3:41
4.	"Boum Boum Boum"	3:52
5.	"Relax (Take It Easy)"	3:11
6.	"Last Party"	4:10
7.	"The Origin of Love"	5:02
8.	"Happy Ending"	5:38
9.	"Over My Shoulder"	4:53
10.	"Good Guys"	4:20
11.	"Rain"	4:08
12.	"Any Other World"	4:48
13.	"Love Today"	4:24
14.	"Elle me dit"	4:29

Notes

- ^{^[a]} – additional production

== Charts ==
=== Weekly charts ===
Chart (2015)	Peak position
Austrian Albums (Ö3 Austria)	74
Belgian Albums (Ultratop Flanders)	9
Belgian Albums (Ultratop Wallonia)	3
Canadian Albums (Billboard)	6
Croatian International Albums (HDU)	10
Dutch Albums (Album Top 100)	20
Czech Albums (ČNS IFPI)	36
French Albums (SNEP)	2
German Albums (Offizielle Top 100)	70
Irish Albums (IRMA)	84
Italian Albums (FIMI)	3
Japanese Albums (Oricon)	33
South Korean Albums (GAON)	10
Spanish Albums (Promusicae)	16
Swiss Albums (Schweizer Hitparade)	4
Swiss Albums (Romandie)	1
UK Albums (Official Charts)	19
US Billboard 200	117

=== Year-end charts ===
Chart (2015)	Position
Belgian Albums (Ultratop Flanders)	178
Belgian Albums (Ultratop Wallonia)	47
Italian Albums (FIMI)	33
French Albums (SNEP)	39
Swiss Albums (Schweizer Hitparade)	83

Chart (2016)	Position
French Albums (SNEP)	178

L'Orchestre Symphonique de Montreal

The deluxe special edition disc was made available and charted separately in Canada.

Chart (2015)	Peak position
Canadian Albums (Billboard)	40

== Certifications ==
Region	Certification	Certified units/sales
France (SNEP)	Platinum	100,000^{*}
Italy (FIMI)	Platinum	50,000^{*}
United Kingdom (BPI)	Silver	60,000^{‡}
^{*} Sales figures based on certification alone.^{‡} Sales+streaming figures based on certification alone.
