= My Name Is Michael Holbrook =

Studio album by Mika
- Released: 4 October 2019
- Recorded: 2017–2019
- Genre: Pop
- Length: 46:15
- Label: Republic
- Producers: Mika (exec.); Mark Crew; Dan Priddy; Dan Black; George Moore; Lorna Blackwood; Jonathan Quarmby; Mitchell Yoshida

Mika chronology
No Place in Heaven (2015)	My Name Is Michael Holbrook (2019)	Que ta tête fleurisse toujours (2023)

Singles from My Name Is Michael Holbrook
- 1. "Ice Cream" Released: 31 May 2019; 2. "Tiny Love" Released: 16 August 2019; 3. "Sanremo" Released: 6 September 2019

My Name Is Michael Holbrook is the fifth studio album by British singer-songwriter Mika. It was released on 4 October 2019 through Republic Records. The album was promoted in North America with the Tiny Love Tiny Tour at small venues in New York, Montreal, San Francisco, Los Angeles and Mexico City. The album was also supported by a worldwide tour, known as the Revelation Tour, which started in London on 10 November 2019 and extended into the first few months of 2020. It had stops in countries throughout Europe, as well as New Zealand and Australia. The remainder of the tour was cancelled in March 2020 due to the COVID-19 pandemic.

== Singles ==
"Ice Cream" was the lead single released from My Name Is Michael Holbrook, on 31 May 2019. A video, directed by Francesco Calabrese and filmed in Barcelona, Spain, was released 27 June 2019. A behind-the-scenes video for the making of the music video and an animated lyric video, were also released for the song. Rolling Stone called the single "summer anthem bait".

"Tiny Love" was released on 16 August 2019, and its video, directed by W.I.Z., featuring Mika and Ronke Arogundade, was released at the same time. According to Billboard magazine, the single is "an ode to the mundane side of love despite the track's grandiose production, sounding like an early-era Queen B-side." The video was shot in London. Mika has said that he wanted to capture the idea that love can feel enormous, "yet at the same time it's so tiny and imperceivable to others."

The single "Sanremo" was released on 6 September 2019. Billboard called the tune "a shimmering pop jam about finding a place just for you and your lover." The video for Sanremo, also directed by W.I.Z., was released on 4 October 2019. Filmed in black-and-white, the short film is set "in an era when homosexuality, if not illegal, was socially unacceptable, a time of discrimination and persecution," says W.I.Z. In the video, a man (Mika) leaves his wife and daughter behind to visit the clandestine spots of a city where he might find a potential gay lover.

== Critical reception ==
Professional ratings
Review scores
Source	Rating
AllMusic	3.5/5 stars
Gigwise	8/10 stars
The Independent	3/5 stars
PopMatters	7/10 stars
The Sydney Morning Herald	2.5/5 stars

Upon release, My Name Is Michael Holbrook was met with generally positive reviews. At Album of the Year, an online aggregator that collects reviews from mainstream publications, the album received an average score of 66 out of 100, based on 5 reviews.

Heather Phares from AllMusic commented that "My Name Is Michael Holbrook is never less than witty and genuine -- and much more enjoyable than if he'd tried to fit into someone else's mold". Matty Pywell of Gigwise gave it a positive review, saying that: "Mika is much better whilst basking in the glory of the sun than in the dank undertones of the city". Brice Ezell from PopMatters said "My Name Is Michael Holbrook doesn't deliver a definitive personal statement on Mika's part, and the production works against his creative vision from time to time. But it does offer half a dozen undeniably catchy jams and a reminder that Mika still ranks up there with the best pop artists of our time".

== Track listing ==
Credits adapted from Apple Music.

No.	Title	Writer(s)	Producer(s)	Length
1.	"Tiny Love"	Michael Penniman Jr.; David Sneddon	Mark Crew; Dan Priddy	4:05
2.	"Ice Cream"	Penniman Jr.; Dan Black	Crew; Priddy; Black	2:46
3.	"Dear Jealousy"	Penniman Jr.; Amy Wadge; George Moore	Crew; Priddy; Moore	3:47
4.	"Paloma"	Penniman Jr.; Sneddon	Crew; Priddy	3:42
5.	"Sanremo"	Penniman Jr.; Sneddon	Crew; Priddy	3:21
6.	"Tomorrow"	Penniman Jr.	Crew; Priddy	3:49
7.	"Ready to Call This Love" (featuring Jack Savoretti)	Penniman Jr.; Dave Gibson; Sneddon	Crew; Priddy; Lorna Blackwood^{[c]}	3:49
8.	"Cry"	Penniman Jr.; Mark Crew; Daniel Priddy	Crew; Priddy	3:17
9.	"Platform Ballerinas"	Penniman Jr.; Wadge	Crew; Priddy	2:47
10.	"I Went to Hell Last Night"	Penniman Jr.; Sneddon	Crew; Priddy; Jonathan Quarmby	3:48
11.	"Blue"	Penniman Jr.; Wadge	Mika	3:09
12.	"Stay High"	Penniman Jr.; Crew; Priddy	Crew; Priddy	3:30
13.	"Tiny Love Reprise"	Penniman Jr.; Sneddon; Jodi Marr	Crew; Priddy; Mitchell Yoshida	4:25
Total length:				46:15

Japanese edition bonus tracks
No.	Title	Writer(s)	Producer(s)	Length
14.	"Sound of an Orchestra"	Penniman Jr.; George Flint; Henry Flint	Crew; Priddy; Mika	2:59
15.	"It's My House"	Penniman Jr.; Jonathan Quarmby; Fiona Bevan	Quarmby	3:22
Total length:				52:45

== Charts ==
=== Weekly charts ===
Chart (2019)	Peak position
Belgian Albums (Ultratop Flanders)	38
Belgian Albums (Ultratop Wallonia)	3
Canadian Albums (Billboard)	30
France Albums (SNEP)	6
Italian Albums (FIMI)	10
Japanese Albums (Oricon)	100
Scottish Albums (Official Charts)	38
Spanish Albums (PROMUSICAE)	28
Swiss Albums (Schweizer Hitparade)	10
UK Albums (Official Charts)	57
US Billboard 200	184

=== Year-end charts ===
Chart (2019)	Position
Belgian Albums (Ultratop Wallonia)	113
French Albums (SNEP)	140
