= Boum Boum Boum =

Single by Mika

from the album No Place in Heaven
- Released: 11 June 2014
- Recorded: 2013−14
- Studio: The House, Los Angeles; Sarm Music Village, London
- Genre: Pop
- Length: 3:18 (first version); 3:26 (second version)
- Label: Barclay; Casablanca; Republic
- Songwriters: Mika; Doriand
- Producers: Mika; Klas Ahlund; Tim Van Der Kuil

Mika singles chronology
| "Stardust" (2013) | "Boum Boum Boum" (2014) | "Talk About You" (2015) |

Music video
- "Boum Boum Boum" on YouTube

"Boum Boum Boum" is a French-language song by British singer Mika, written by himself alongside Doriand, while produced by Mika, Klas Ahlund and Tim Van Der Kuil. The song was released as a single on 11 June 2014 and was later included on the French as well as on the Italian and Japanese editions of Mika's fourth studio album No Place in Heaven (2015).

The album version is slightly different from the single release, with the ''boom boom boom'' female spoken words removed.

== Composition ==
"Boum Boum Boum" is a Latin-influenced song that is "about Mika and his partner in love loving to make 'the act of love' everywhere they go"

== Critical reception ==
Kevipod from Direct Lyrics praised the song's "easy chorus, cute French and summer vibe," commenting that he doesn't "see any difficulty for it to become smash in France or Belgium this summer."

== Chart positions ==
=== Weekly charts ===
| Chart (2014) | Peak position |
|---|---|
| Belgium (Ultratip Bubbling Under Flanders) | 14 |
| Belgium (Ultratop 50 Wallonia) | 10 |
| Canada Hot 100 (Billboard) | 86 |
| France (SNEP) | 10 |
| Italy (FIMI) | 43 |
| South Korea International Songs (GAON) | 54 |
| Switzerland (Schweizer Hitparade) | 62 |

=== Year-end charts ===
| Chart (2014) | Position |
|---|---|
| Belgium (Ultratop Wallonia) | 76 |
| France (SNEP) | 80 |
