= Dodgy Holiday =

Dodgy Holiday EP

EP by Mika
- Released: 20 November 2006
- Recorded: 2005–06
- Genre: Pop
- Length: 12:46
- Labels: Island (UK), Universal (AUS)
- Producer: Mika

Mika chronology
Dodgy Holiday EP (2006)	Life in Cartoon Motion (2007)

Dodgy Holiday is the first extended play released by British pop singer Mika. It was released digitally on 20 November 2006, prior to the release of Life in Cartoon Motion, his debut album, which was later released in February 2007. The name of the EP was derived from the lyrics of the song "Billy Brown", which was included on the EP. A physical version of the EP was available for a limited time only and contained an exclusive 24-page booklet containing unseen photos and lyrics. Mika's first official headlining tour was named in honour of the EP. The EP was also made available via Target stores in the United States.

== Track listing ==
1. "Billy Brown" – 3:15
2. "Love Today" (acoustic) – 2:56
3. "Relax, Take It Easy" (BBC Blue Room session) – 3:45
4. "My Interpretation" (acoustic) – 2:50

== Release history ==
Region	Date	Label	Format
United Kingdom	20 November 2006	Island	Digital download, CD
Australia	20 February 2007	Universal Music Australia	Digital download
