= Mika (singer) =

British Lebanese singer (born 1983)

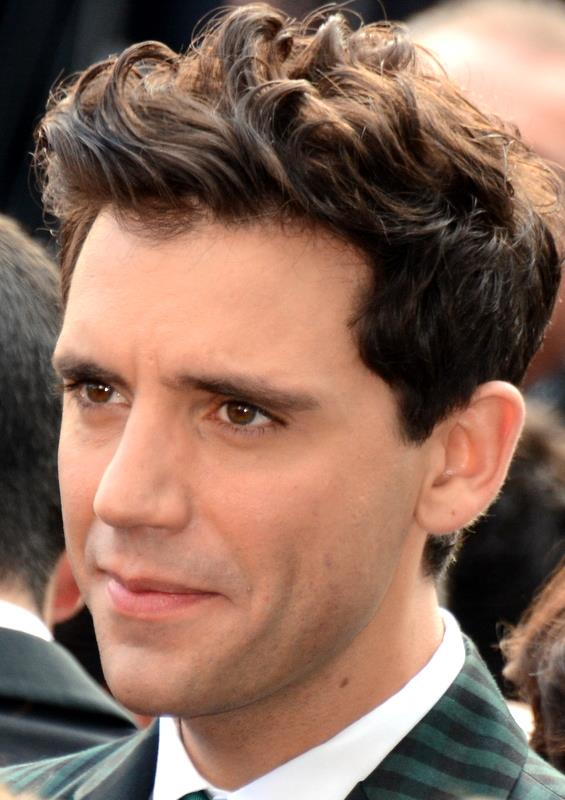
- Mika at the Cannes Film Festival in 2014
- Born: Michael Holbrook Penniman Jr. 18 August 1983 (age 43); Beirut, Lebanon
- Other names: Mica; Mika Penniman
- Citizenship: United Kingdom; United States
- Occupations: Singer; songwriter; actor; producer
- Relatives: William Peter Blatty (second uncle); J. T. Blatty (second cousin); Germanos Mouakkad (great-great-uncle)
- Musical career
- Genres: Pop; pop rock; glam rock; power pop
- Instruments: Vocals; keyboards
- Years active: 2006–present
- Labels: Casablanca; Republic; Universal
- Website: yomika.com

Michael Holbrook Penniman Jr. (born 18 August 1983), known professionally as Mika (/ˈmiːkə/ MEE-kə, stylised in all caps), is a Lebanese-British singer-songwriter based in Paris and London. Mika rose to prominence after the release of his first extended play, Dodgy Holiday (2006), which contained his debut single "Relax, Take It Easy". The track was released in October 2006, and topped the charts throughout Europe. His first full-length studio album, Life in Cartoon Motion (2007), released on Island Records, was led by the single "Grace Kelly" which topped the UK Singles Chart for five weeks starting in January 2007. The album reached number one on the UK Albums Chart, and sold more than 8 million copies worldwide. Life in Cartoon Motion helped Mika win a Brit Award in 2008 for Best British Breakthrough act, while its single "Love Today" was nominated for a Grammy Award.

Mika's second studio album, The Boy Who Knew Too Much (2009), reached number four on the UK Albums Chart, and spawned the UK top-five single "We Are Golden". His third studio album, The Origin of Love (2012), reached number one on the French albums chart and produced the French number-one single "Elle me dit". He subsequently released the albums No Place in Heaven (2015), My Name Is Michael Holbrook (2019), and the French-language album Que ta tête fleurisse toujours (2023), all of which achieved commercial success in Europe. Additionally, he served as judge and mentor on both the French and Spanish versions of The Voice, and the Italian version of X Factor. After a brief music hiatus, Mika released his seventh studio album, Hyperlove (2026), which became his highest charting album in the United Kingdom since The Boy Who Knew Too Much.

In addition to his music career, Mika starred for two seasons in his own television variety show in Italy, Stasera Casa Mika, which won the 2017 Rose d'Or Award for Entertainment, and has hosted his own BBC Radio 2 show, The Art of Song. In 2022, he co-hosted the Eurovision Song Contest alongside Italian singer Laura Pausini and Italian television presenter Alessandro Cattelan. Mika has worked as a visual artist and designer on various projects, among them designing sunglasses for the Italian eyewear company Lozza, a clothing line for Belgian retailer JBC, pens for the 100th anniversary of Pilot, and collaborated with his sister Yasmine on three watches for Swiss company Swatch.

== Life and career ==
=== 1983–2006: Childhood and early career ===
Michael Holbrook Penniman Jr. was born on 18 August 1983, in Beirut, the third of five children—he has two older sisters, Yasmine and Paloma, a younger sister Zuleika, and a younger brother, Fortuné. His parents are an American-born Lebanese-Syrian mother (Mary Joan "Joannie", née Mouakad, daughter of John Mouakad and Odette Farah) and an American father (Michael Holbrook Penniman, son of William Frederick Penniman III and Dorothy Dyar). Mika's father was a banker born in Jerusalem. His paternal grandfather William Frederick Penniman III was a diplomat. Mika's maternal grandfather John Mouakad was Syrian (from Damascus) and his maternal grandmother Odette Farah was Lebanese (from Beirut). He is also the second-nephew of writer William Peter Blatty, best known for his 1971 novel The Exorcist, the second cousin of photojournalist J. T. Blatty, and the great-great-nephew of Melkite bishop Germanos Mouakkad.

When Mika was a year old, his family were forced to leave war-torn Lebanon, and moved to Paris, France. The family lived for a time in Paris. "I was brought up as a Parisian boy, you know," Mika said in an interview. "With the pencil-striped trousers and the hat that I had to wear to school. It was very traditional..." At a young age, Mika learned to play his first piano piece — "Les Champs-Élysées", by Joe Dassin. At the age of seven, he wrote his first song, a piano instrumental called "Angry", which he later described in an interview as being "awful". In 1990, Mika's father went on a business trip to Kuwait, where he became trapped in the U.S. embassy for about eight months when the Gulf War broke out. Upon his return home, he was forced to take a new job, and the family moved to London when Mika was 9 years old. There, he attended the Lycée Français Charles de Gaulle, where he experienced severe bullying and had problems with dyslexia. In response to these experiences Mika was home-schooled by his mother and trained in music by Alla Ardakov (Ablaberdyeva), a Russian opera professional. He also studied with the Royal Opera in London and made his stage debut as a chorus member in Strauss's Die Frau Ohne Schatten at the Royal Opera House in London's Covent Garden. He continued as a boy soprano with the Royal Opera and, at 15, he performed in a 1998 production of The Pilgrim's Progress by Vaughan Williams.

During this time, Mika sang jingles for a variety of companies, most notably, Orbit chewing gum and British Airways. Once he returned to school, Mika attended St Philip's School in Kensington, where he was the head of the Schola Cantorum (the St Philip's Choir). He later attended Westminster School in London, where he took the lead role in a number of school productions. After a very brief stint at the London School of Economics, Mika then managed to gain entrance to the Royal College of Music, which he later left to record his first album at Casablanca Records.

His first single was a limited 7"/download release called "Relax, Take It Easy" (2006). The single was included on his debut EP Dodgy Holiday, which became available for download on 20 November 2006. The song "Billy Brown" was made available on 20 November 2006 on the iTunes Store. He appeared on BBC Radio 2 on 13 December 2006, where he was interviewed by Paul Gambaccini as part of the 'Class of 2006'.

=== 2007–2008: Life in Cartoon Motion ===
The comparisons to Freddie Mercury are fine. They started long before I made the record – I've even referred to it in Grace Kelly. A Freddie comparison is a compliment. He's a genius and one of the best there's ever been.

— Mika following being named the BBC's Sound of 2007

On 8 January 2007, Mika released the song "Grace Kelly" for digital download through Casablanca Records, as the lead single from his then upcoming debut studio album. On 19 January 2007, he appeared on Later... with Jools Holland, and on The Friday Night Project. That same month, Mika was voted the top of the BBC News website's Sound of 2007 poll. "Grace Kelly" reached number one on the UK Singles Chart on 21 January 2007, and stayed at the top-spot for five weeks. His debut album, Life in Cartoon Motion, was released on 5 February 2007, and debuted at number one on the UK Albums Chart, while topping the charts in eleven other countries. He earned a UK chart double for the week of 11 February 2007, as "Grace Kelly" placed at number one on the UK singles chart, while Life in Cartoon Motion debuted at number one on the UK albums chart. (Note: Attributed to the Official Charts Company's UK Singles Chart dated 11 February 2007, and UK Albums Chart dated 11 February 2007.) Musically, the album brought comparisons to artists such as Freddie Mercury, Scissor Sisters, Elton John, Prince, Robbie Williams and David Bowie. "Grace Kelly" references Mercury in the lyrics: "I try to be like Grace Kelly/But all her looks were too sad/So I tried a little Freddie/I've gone identity mad." The album went on to sell more than 8 million copies worldwide.

Life in Cartoon Motion has a coming of age theme and deals with Mika's transition from childhood to the present, though he has stated that not all of the songs are autobiographical. The album addresses difficult topics, such as on the song "Big Girl (You Are Beautiful)", which explores the theme of larger women suffering from discrimination. Mika has said that the fact that his mother was a big woman, and that he had seen the prejudices against her, helped him to write the song. On the song "Billy Brown", Mika writes about a man who is married to a woman, but has an affair with another man.

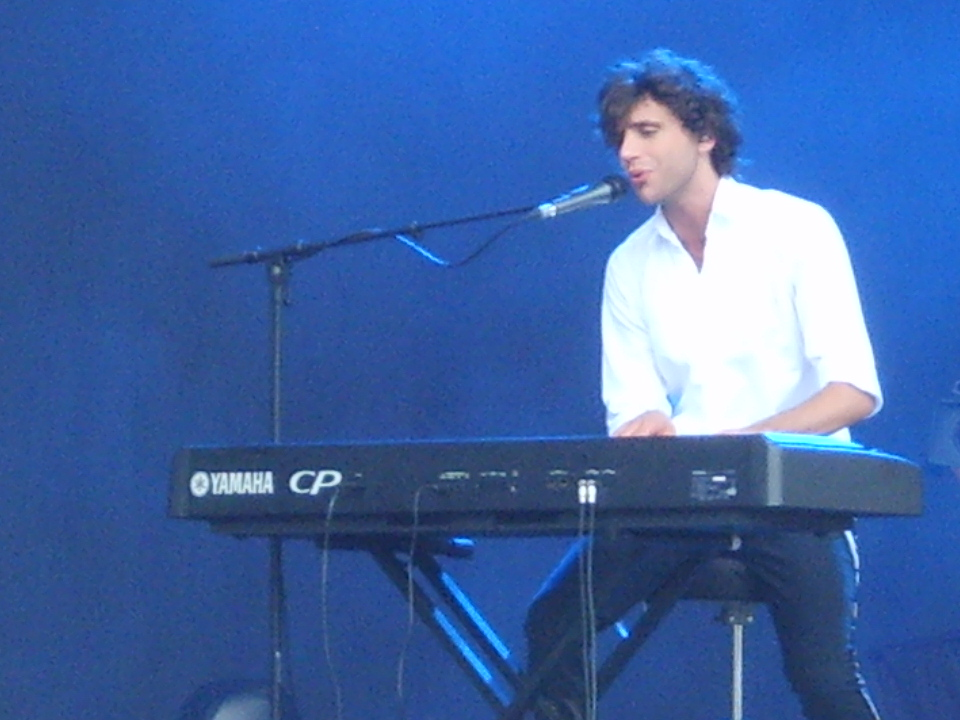
Mika at the V Festival in 2007

Mika toured the United States in June 2007, with support from Sara Bareilles and Natalia Lesz. He was the musical act for The Tonight Show with Jay Leno on 26 March 2007 and for Jimmy Kimmel Live! on 27 March 2007. He was the musical guest on So You Think You Can Dance on 26 July 2007. On 10 October 2007, Mika began his Dodgy Holiday Tour, playing at venues across Europe. The British band Palladium were the supporting act for the UK leg. The North American leg of the tour began in January 2008, with support from The Midway State and Creature, and continued through February. On 10 February 2008, he attended the 50th Annual Grammy Awards in Los Angeles, where he was nominated for Best Dance Recording for his song "Love Today". On 20 February 2008, Mika opened the 2008 Brit Awards with a live performance of "Love Today", "Grace Kelly", and a duet, "Standing in the Way of Control", with Beth Ditto of Gossip. He was awarded the BRIT Award for Best British Breakthrough Artist later that night.

=== 2009–2010: The Boy Who Knew Too Much ===
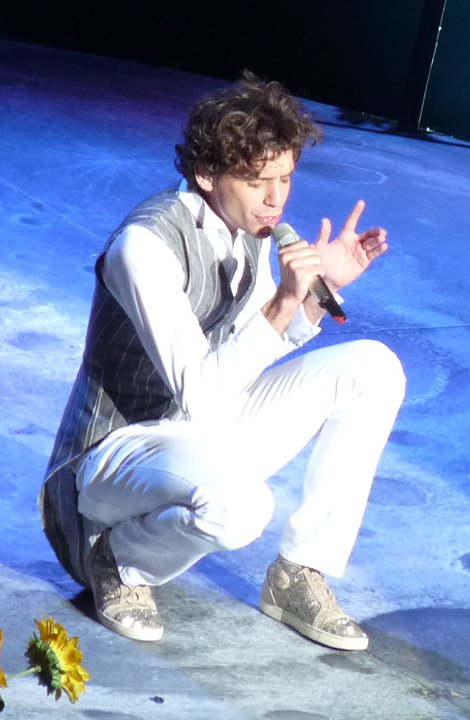
Mika, performing in Colmar, France, in August 2010

Prior to the release of his second studio album, Mika released a limited-edition extended play titled Songs for Sorrow on 8 June 2009. The EP includes four tracks and a 68-page book, featuring lyrics and illustrated interpretations of each song by some of the singer's favourite artists and designers, among them Jim Woodring, Sophie Blackall, Alber Elbaz, and his own sister, DaWack. The song "Blue Eyes" was used to promote the EP, and was A-listed on the BBC Radio 2 playlist.

Mika's second studio album The Boy Who Knew Too Much was released on 21 September 2009. Mika recorded the majority of the album in Los Angeles with producer and musician Greg Wells, who also produced his debut album Life in Cartoon Motion. On 20 July 2009, in an on-air interview with DJ Jo Whiley on BBC Radio 1, Mika explained that the album "deals with his adolescent teenage years", and revealed that he was considering renaming it, because he wanted "something a little more ridiculous". The album was originally titled We Are Golden after the first single from the album, "We Are Golden", but was later changed to The Boy Who Knew Too Much.

The first single from the album, "We Are Golden", made its radio debut in the United Kingdom on 20 July 2009, on BBC Radio 2. It was released for digital download on 6 September 2009, with the physical release following on 7 September 2009. The single debuted at number four on the UK Singles Chart on 13 September 2009. Mika's promotional tour of the single included live performances at the iTunes Festival 2009 at The Roundhouse in Camden, London and on Friday Night with Jonathan Ross in September 2009. It was reported that Mika spent £25,000 on drinks after inviting fans to join him at his local pub, via Twitter on 7 September 2009, to celebrate the release of his single.

"Blame It on the Girls" was released as the second single in the United States and Japan, with "Rain" being the second single in the United Kingdom, released on 23 November. Mika embarked on an American promotional tour in late 2009, consisting of live performances on Good Morning America in New York City on 25 September 2009 and the Late Show with David Letterman on 14 October 2009. This was followed by a concert tour, titled the 1955 Tour, which visited cities in North America, Australia, and Asia throughout October and November 2009. In November 2009, Mika performed "Rain" and "We Are Golden" live at the Sydney Opera House for the Australian Idol Grand Final, and later performed on the Australian TV show Sunrise on the Seven Network. On 30 November 2009, Mika performed "Let It Snow" in a duet with Japanese pop star Hikaru Utada. In December 2009, Mika performed at the Royal Variety Performance in front of Queen Elizabeth II and Prince Philip, Duke of Edinburgh. He sang his single, "Rain," during the evening, which included performances by Lady Gaga, Michael Bublé, Miley Cyrus, Bette Midler, and Whoopi Goldberg, and later had the chance to meet Queen Elizabeth and Prince Philip.

On 15 February 2010, "Blame It on the Girls" was released as the third single from The Boy Who Knew Too Much in the United Kingdom. On 21 March 2010, Mika performed a song he had written, "Gave It All Away", with Boyzone on ITV1 for Boyzone: A Tribute To Stephen Gately. In May 2010, Mika released the single "Kick Ass (We Are Young)", the title track to the 2010 film Kick-Ass. The song played during the film's closing credits.

=== 2011–2014: The Origin of Love, X Factor Italy and Songbook Vol.1 ===
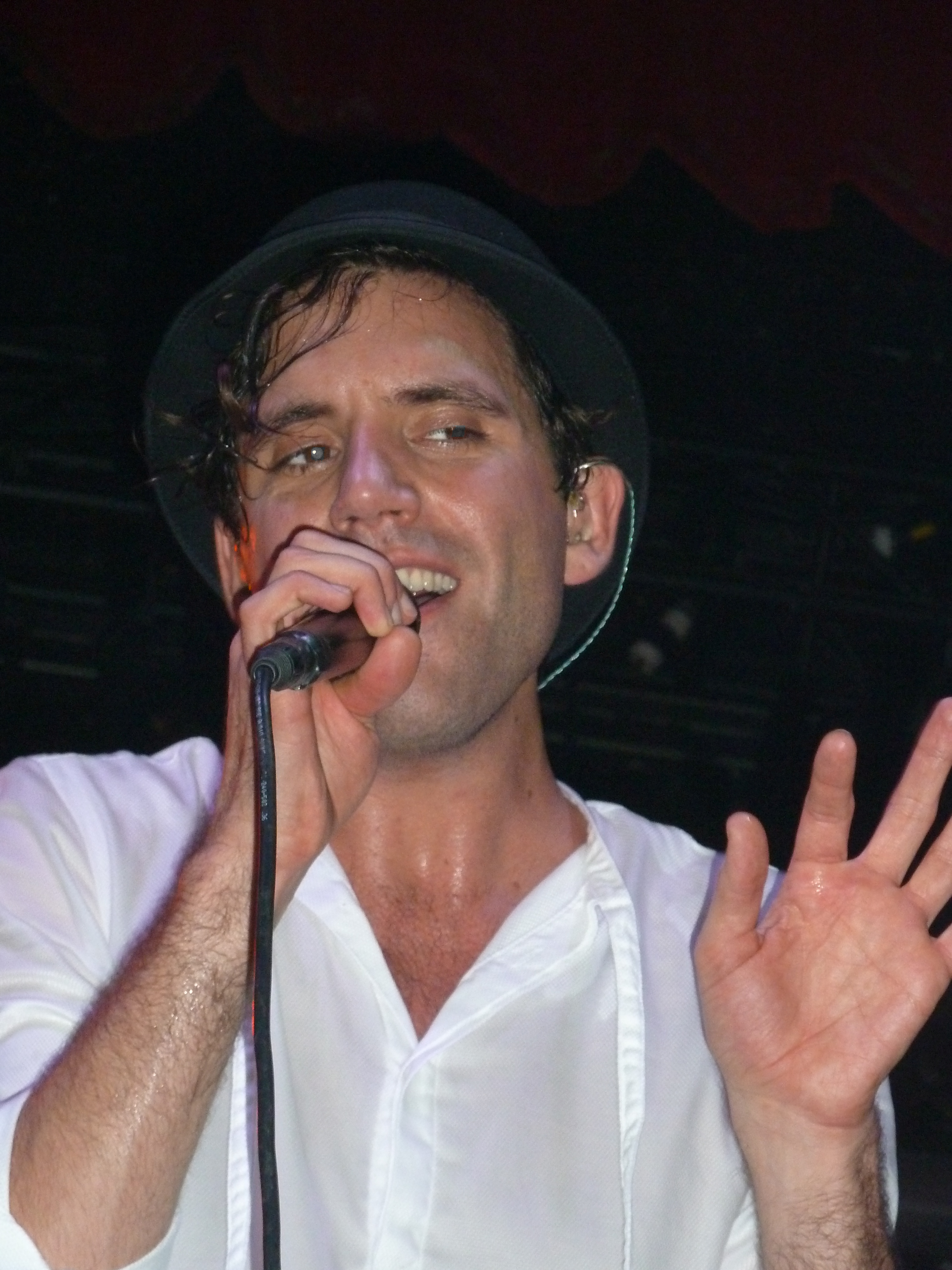
Mika performing in New York City in October 2012

Before the release of his third album, Mika stated in numerous interviews that it would be more simplistic and less layered than The Boy Who Knew Too Much. Mika announced the title of the album, The Origin of Love in a French interview on 17 June 2011. Mika said he would include a number of French tracks on the album, and that the musical style was inspired by Daft Punk and Fleetwood Mac, while describing the project overall as less "childlike" and more "serious". The first single from the album,"Elle me dit", Mika's first French-language track, was released digitally on 1 July 2011. The video for the song was released 16 August, and features the French actress Fanny Ardant, along with a number of other well-known French actors and personalities.

On 8 June 2012, the video for "Make You Happy" was released on the video hosting platform Vimeo. The song served as a buzz single for the album. On 14 June 2012, "Celebrate", which features Pharrell Williams, was announced as the album's lead single in the United Kingdom, Europe, and America, and the second single in France. The Origin of Love was released internationally on 17 September 2012 and in the United Kingdom on 8 October 2012. Mika collaborated with a number of artists on various tracks on the album, including Nick Littlemore of Empire of the Sun, Paul Steel, frYars, Doriand, Priscilla Renea, Billboard, Hillary Lindsey, Pharrell Williams, Benny Benassi and Klas Åhlund. Longtime collaborator Greg Wells was involved in the production of the album.

The album track "Popular Song", which Mika co-wrote and performed on the album with songwriter Priscilla Renea (who now goes by the professional name Muni Long), was later released as a single, remixed and featuring American singer Ariana Grande. The song interpolates a well-known melody from the musical "Wicked" by Stephen Schwartz

On 8 August 2012, Mika performed at the 2012 Summer Olympics in London, before the gold medal beach volleyball game, where he sang "Grace Kelly" and "Celebrate" on the sand court. The same day, he held a question and answer session with fans and performed a short set for Rock The Games, which was live-streamed on the YouTube channel of the London 2012 games. At the time he was working on The Origin of Love, Mika also contributed his vocals to the production of The All-American Rejects' 2012 album Kids in the Street, and collaborated with the American singer Madonna on the track "Gang Bang", included on her album MDNA (2012).

On 23 April 2013, Mika was revealed to be the new judge on the seventh season of The X Factor Italy. He was the first international mentor on the Italian edition of the show. On 18 November 2013, Mika released a compilation album in Italy titled Songbook Vol. 1, including 20 songs from his three previous albums, plus some re-worked tracks. On 17 January 2014, Mika appeared on the Italian television show Le Invasioni Barbariche on La7, where he performed a duet with the Nobel Prize in Literature recipient Dario Fo of the song "Ho visto un Re". During the appearance, he was presented with a platinum disc for Songbook Vol. 1. That same month, Mika joined The Voice France as a judge and mentor. One of his contestants, Kendji Girac, won the competition that year. Mika released another French single on 11 June 2014, titled "Boum Boum Boum". The music video for the single was released on 7 July, and was filmed entirely in Spain on the set of the Spaghetti Western film The Good, the Bad and the Ugly. It features Mika in a variety of guises – from cowboy to James Bond-like spy.

=== 2015–2018: No Place in Heaven ===
In February 2015, Mika performed a series of three concerts with the Montreal Symphony Orchestra, under the direction of conductor Simon Leclerc. The concerts featured a selection of Mika's songs scored for a full orchestra by Mika and Leclerc, and were positively reviewed by attendees. A similar performance by the duo took place in October 2015 at the Teatro Sociale in Como, Italy, and was televised; a DVD featuring the recording was later released under the title "Sinfonia Pop".

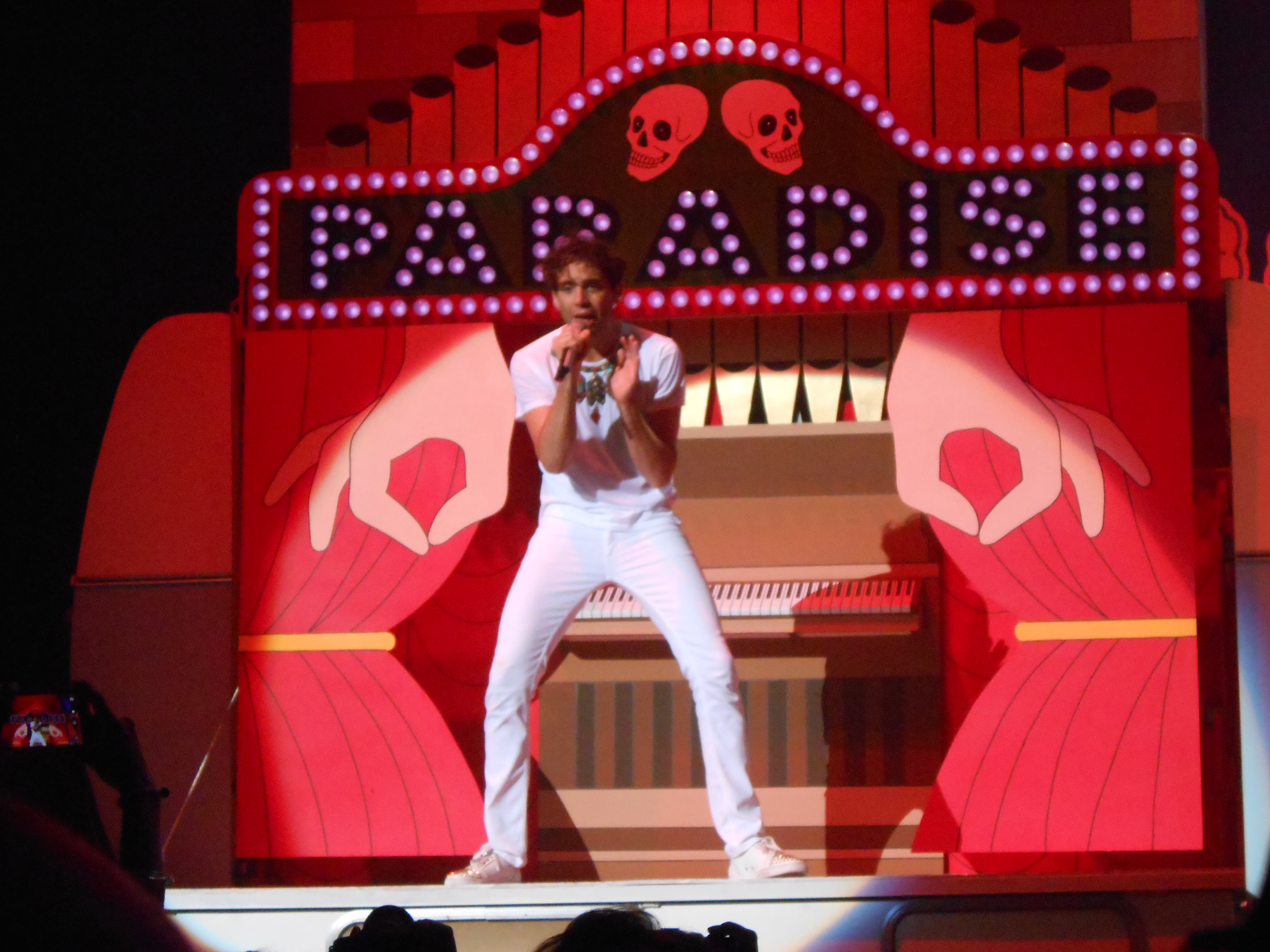
Mika performing on tour in October 2015

On 25 March 2015, Mika released the song "Talk About You", through Casablanca Records and Republic Records, as the lead single from his then upcoming fourth studio album. The song's music video was released to YouTube on 28 April. Mika began a tour to support the upcoming album, beginning with a show on 3 May 2015 in Brooklyn, New York, and visiting various other major cities in North America, Europe and Asia throughout 2015. A music video for a then-unreleased track, "Last Party", was published on 8 April 2015. The album's second single, "Good Guys", was released released on 25 May 2015 alongside its music video.

Mika's fourth studio album, No Place in Heaven, was released on 15 June 2015. He described the album as "direct, low-down, open, candid, playful, yet a mature pop album which takes its inspiration from '60s pop music". On 13 November 2015, the album was re-released in France, Italy and Switzerland in the form of a double-disc deluxe edition, containing a number of bonus tracks on disc one. The second disc features the full-length orchestral concert by Mika with the Montreal Symphony Orchestra, which took place earlier that year. The album fared well commercially, reaching the top ten on the charts in Belgium, Canada, Croatia, France, Italy, South Korea, and Switzerland, and number 19 in the United Kingdom.

On 29 January 2016, an uptempo remix of "Hurts" was released as the final single from No Place in Heaven. The song was included on the soundtrack of the Italian film Un Bacio (A Kiss) (2016), directed by Ivan Cotroneo, which explores the theme of fighting against homophobia and bullying. Cotroneo also directed the song's music video, which featured clips from the movie and Mika alongside the film's three main actors. At the time, Mika was quoted as saying, "It was extraordinary to find out how the words of my song were perfect for the film. So the collaboration with Ivan was born naturally." Later that year, Mika began filming for his television show, titled Stasera casa Mika (2016–17), in Italy. The show was in a variety format, and featured a number of Italian actors, musicians and other cultural icons, as well as performers from around the world, including Kylie Minogue, Sting, LP and Dita Von Teese. In addition to music, the show had comedy sketches and in-depth looks at life around Italy. The show won the 2017 Rose d'Or as Best Entertainment Series. That same year (and briefly in 2019), Mika hosted a series of episodes of Mika: The Art Of Song on BBC Radio 2. In the programs, he discussed musical influences and focused on a variety of artists, including Joni Mitchell and Carole King.

Mika reunited with conductor Simon Leclerc at the end of 2016 to perform two concerts at the Teatro dell'Opera di Firenze in collaboration with the Maggio Musicale Fiorentino. Two concerts were held, on 30 and 31 December, respectively, under the direction of Leclerc, who had previously conducted Mika's symphonic performances in Montreal and Como the prior year. In February 2017, Mika performed a medley of his own songs at the Sanremo Festival, as well as a tribute to the late George Michael.

In October 2017, Mika released a single titled "It's My House", which also served as the theme song for the second series of his show Stasera Casa Mika. The following month, Mika featured on the album Dalida by Ibrahim Malouf, a tribute album to the late Egyptian-Italian-French singer. He performed a cover of the Egyptian song "Salma Ya Salama", which Dalida had sung in both Arabic and French in 1977.

In 2018, Mika featured on Adam to Eve no Ringo, a tribute album to Japanese musician Ringo Sheena, covering Sheena's song "Sid to Hakuchūmu" from her debut album Muzai Moratorium (1999). In late 2018, Mika recorded a collaboration with the French singers Doriand and Philippe Katerine on a single titled "Danser Entre Hommes", which was ultimately released on 30 August 2019. All three men appear in the song's music video.

=== 2019–2020: My Name Is Michael Holbrook ===
On 31 May 2019, Mika released the single "Ice Cream", and announced the title of his fifth studio album, My Name Is Michael Holbrook, and its release date of 4 October 2019. The album, described as "intensely personal" by a number of reviewers, contains elements of "disco-tinged exuberance" and "joyous pop" with "anthemic choruses and vocal harmonies". Several singles and accompanying videos were released in the months leading up to the debut of the album: "Tiny Love" (released as the second single on 16 August 2019), "Dear Jealousy", "Tomorrow", and "Sanremo" (released as the third single on 6 September 2019). My Name Is Michael Holbrook was promoted in September 2019 with the seven-date Tiny Love Tiny Tour at small venues in New York, Montreal, San Francisco, Los Angeles and Mexico City. In addition, Mika appeared on the American TV show Late Night with Seth Meyers on 11 September 2019, performing "Tiny Love", along with "Big Girl" from his first album.

Mika collaborated with singer Jack Savoretti on the single "Youth And Love", which was released on 28 June 2019. It received a national radio premiere in the United Kingdom on BBC Radio 2, on 19 June 2019, and was subsequently added to BBC Radio 2's New Music Playlist. Savoretti subsequently appeared on the seventh track from My Name Is Michael Holbrook, titled "Ready to Call This Love". On 25 July 2019, Mika was a guest at singer Andrea Bocelli's charity orchestral concert at Teatro del Silenzio in Lajatico, Italy, and sang a duet with him on the song "Ali Di Libertà". Mika also sang his own songs "Happy Ending" and "Tiny Love", accompanied by the orchestra and a troupe of dancers. The concert was broadcast on Italian television network RAI1 on 14 September 2019. In October 2019, Mika was honoured with the Music Award at the 2019 Virgin Atlantic Attitude Awards hosted in London by Attitude magazine. In a related article for Attitude, Mika noted, "If I didn't have music, I would not have been able to understand or deal with my sexuality in the same way. It's always been at the centre of my writing."

My Name Is Michael Holbrook was released on 4 October 2019 to generally positive reviews, and was a moderate commercial success, reaching the top ten on the charts in France, Italy, Switzerland, and the Wallonia region of Belgium, but underperformed elsewhere. In November 2019, Mika launched a worldwide tour, the Revelation Tour, in support of the album. The 2019 leg of the tour included dates in Spain, France, Italy, Switzerland and Belgium. It continued in 2020 with stops in Netherlands, Luxembourg, France, and Italy, and an Oceania leg taking place in New Zealand and Australia. In conjunction with the tour, Mika made several television appearances, including in a live episode of X Factor Italia on 24 October 2019; the finale of France's The Voice Kids on 25 October 2019; and the live finale of Danse Avec les Stars on 23 November 2019. Mika also performed on top of the Eiffel Tower in Paris as part of its 130th anniversary celebration in October 2019.

In January 2020, Mika released the live album "MIKA Live at Brooklyn Steel", for digital download and streaming; a live recording of his 13 September 2019 concert at Brooklyn Steel in New York. Due to the COVID-19 pandemic, Mika announced in February 2020 the cancellation of the Asian leg of the Revelation Tour in Japan, China and South Korea. Subsequently, the North and South American leg of the tour were also cancelled. After the devastating explosion that hit Beirut in August 2020, Mika organised a streaming concert in aid of the city's residents in light of his Lebanese heritage. The resulting concert film, titled "I Love Beirut", featured a number of international performers, including Kylie Minogue, Danna Paola, Louane, Salma Hayek and Rufus Wainwright. It was viewed in 106 countries globally, and raised more than €1 million.

Mika returned to X Factor Italia as a judge in the summer of 2020. In August 2020, he released a new song "Le Coeur Holiday" with the French rapper Soprano. The song's video is an animated short that features cartoon versions of the singers in a "touching tale of friendship". That same month, Mika collaborated with Italian singer Michele Bravi on a duet, with an updated version of "Bella d'estate", originally recorded in 1987 by the singer Mango. On 11 September 2020, Mika appeared along with Mexican singer and actress Danna Paola on her single titled "Me, Myself". Around this time, he also provided vocals for the song "Six Heures d'Avion Nous Séparent", which appears on Pierre Lapointe's album Chansons Hivernales (2020).

In December 2020, Mika hosted "Do Re MIKA Sol", a concert to benefit the charity Imagine for Margo, held in the pediatric department of the French Institut Curie. The concert was broadcast live on Facebook. Mika performed a set of Christmas carols for patients and their families, and hospital staff, accompanied by members of the 100 Voices of Gospel. In mid-December, Mika performed an intimate live concert at the Palace of Versailles with the Royal Opera of Versailles and a variety of classical and other musicians. A live album of the concert, Mika a l'Opéra Royal de Versailles, was later released in early 2021. Mika also performed at the New Year's Eve celebration, La Grande Soirée, filmed at Versailles, which aired on France 2, where he performed an 8-minute opening medley of some of his biggest hits. The program ended with a medley of his songs, and an array of fireworks and pyrotechnics as backdrop to ring in the new year.

=== 2021–2022: Other ventures during the COVID-19 pandemic ===
In March 2021, Mika launched a project that was billed as an open-air exhibition to give colours back to Paris. Collaborating with a number of artists and his sister Yasmine, he created a series of posters that were displayed on the Morris columns and other advertising boards around the city. In the spring of 2021, Mika served as artistic director for two episodes of the Canadian version of Star Académie, during which he coached the contestants and performed with them.

In June 2021, Mika partnered with job-search platform Indeed for an initiative called "Soundtrack of Empathy". The initiative encouraged workers to share their music playlists with colleagues, in an effort to create a more empathetic workplace. Along with the "Soundtrack of Empathy", Mika performed a live-streamed benefit concert, which raised $40,000 for Lady Gaga's Born This Way Foundation. There was also an influencer roundtable featuring artists selected by Mika, who spoke about the shared language of music and how it naturally encourages empathy and sparks vulnerability.

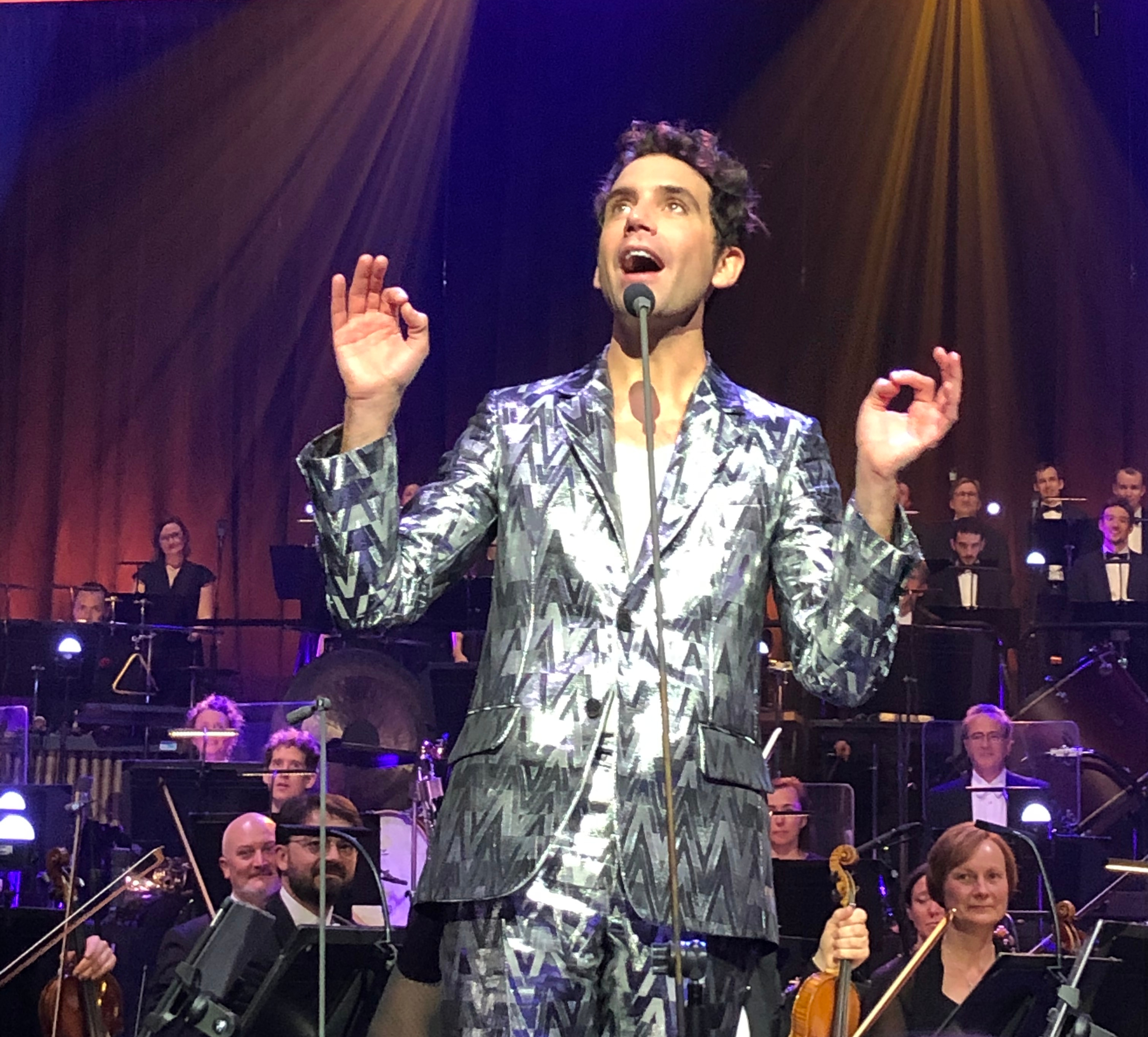
Mika at the Philharmonie de Paris in October 2021

In July 2021, Mika performed at two private concerts hosted by jeweler Chopard during the Cannes Film Festival. While attending these events, he was followed by Italian filmmaker Pif, who filmed a special episode of a day in Mika's life, which was broadcast in the fall on Italian television show Il Testimone (The Witness). Mika continued his work as a judge on X Factor Italia in 2021, alongside co-judges singer Emma Marrone, Italian rapper and producer Hell Raton, and Manuel Agnelli, of the Italian band Afterhours. He also rejoined The Voice France, for a special "All-Stars" 10th anniversary edition. In September 2021, Mika headlined a private event hosted by American Express for its premium cardholders. The concert was held at Salle Pleyel in Paris for approximately 2,000 attendees. Reuniting once again with composer and conductor Simon Leclerc, Mika performed orchestral versions of many of his hits during two sold-out concerts in October at the Philharmonie de Paris. The concerts were performed with the National Orchestra de France and the Stella Maris Choir on 23 and 24 October. The 23 October concert was filmed and subsequently broadcast on TV in both France and Italy. It was later also broadcast on several PBS stations in the United States.

In early December 2021, Mika announced that he would be continuing his partnership with Indeed, which would sponsor a short North American tour in spring 2022. With stops in Brooklyn, Boston, Montreal and Toronto, the "For the Rite of Spring Tour" was scheduled to span three weeks in April. Additional dates were later added, including two dates at the Coachella festival in California. Following the tours' conclusion, Mika served as the co-host for the Eurovision Song Contest 2022 alongside Italian singer Laura Pausini and TV presenter Alessandro Cattelan. The show was broadcast live globally, with audience figures reaching 161 million viewers.

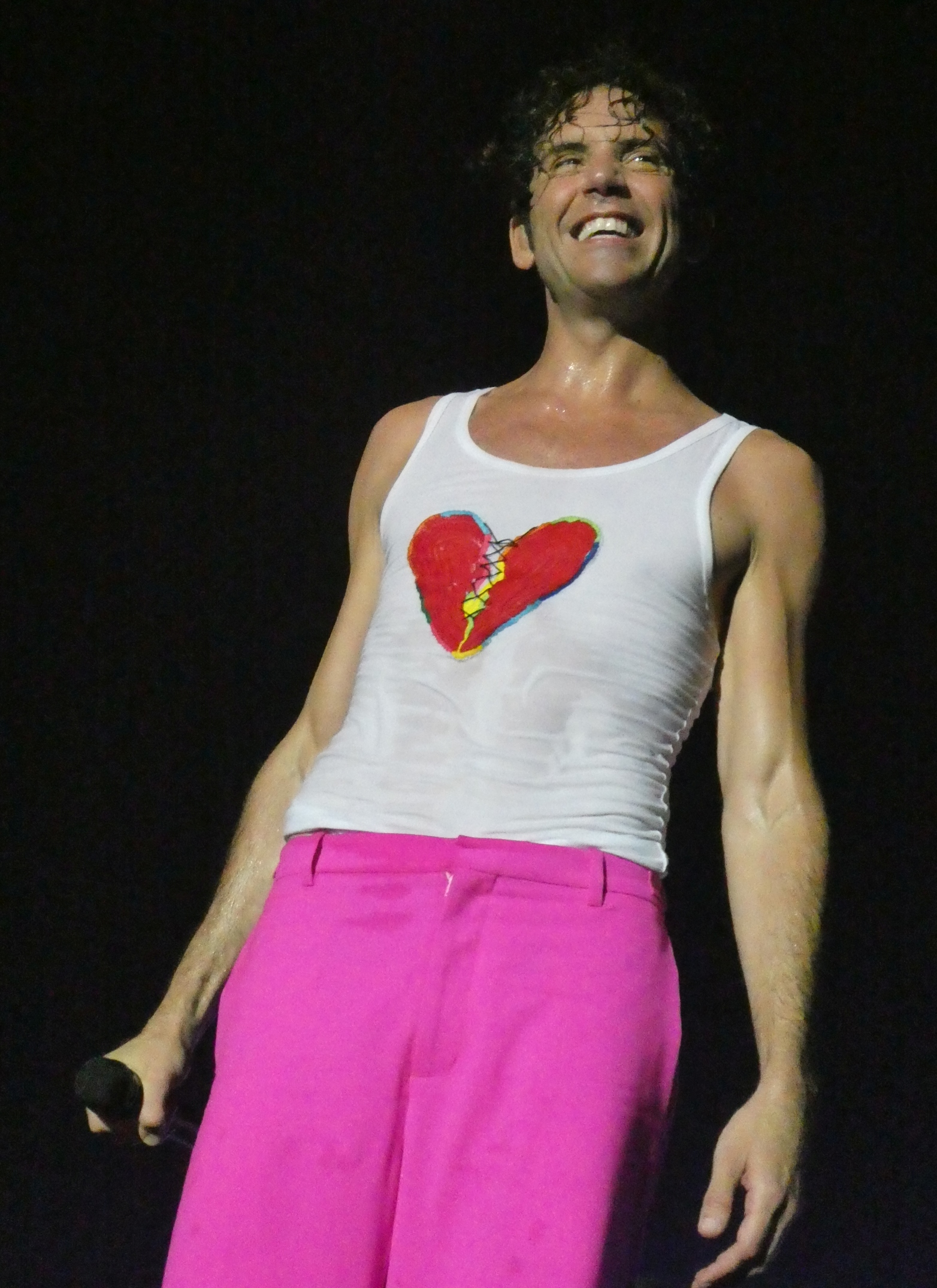
Mika at Roundhouse London on 3 July 2022

On 13 May 2022, Mika released the single "Yo Yo", along with its lyric video. Mika performed "Yo Yo" for the first time as part of the interval act at the grand final of the Eurovision contest on 14 May 2022. The video for "Yo Yo" was directed by Mika and was released on 14 June. That same month, Mika performed at Disneyland Paris Pride, an appearance that was postponed from two years earlier due to the pandemic. He also appeared on Take Pride Live!, an hour-long YouTube Pride Month special sponsored by Indeed, and hosted by Terrell Grice. During the program, Mika debuted a new song titled "Who's Gonna Love Me Now?". The ballad is featured in the directorial debut of American actor and singer Billy Porter, Anything's Possible (2022). On 17 June, Mika released a new single "Bolero", with Italian singer BabyK, with the music video featuring both singers being released on 14 July. Mika promoted the single by performing it with BabyK at the TIM Summer Hits show in Italy.

On 3 July 2022, Mika held his first concert in the United Kingdom in more than two years, at the Roundhouse in Camden, London. This was followed by an array of festival shows throughout July, August, and September, with stops in France, Switzerland, Belgium, Spain and Sardinia. Due to technical and logistical problems, his planned "Magic Piano Tour" covering 10 dates in Italy in September and October was indefinitely postponed. Mika performed one Italian concert date—at the Arena di Verona, on 19 September, to approximately 20,000 fans, who were "entertained for almost two hours, with confetti, balloons, bubbles, fan actions and more" in an "explosive end-of-summer celebration". In October 2022, Mika performed in Monte Carlo, at a charity event organised by the Venetian Arts Foundation to benefit the Prince Albert II Foundation, and its coastal resilience and marine protection projects.

=== 2023–2024: The Piano and Que ta tête fleurisse toujours ===
On 18 January 2023, Mika released a new single, "Keep It Simple", with French singer-songwriter Vianney. Later that month, he hosted "Le Gala des Pieces Jaunes", a charity show in support of Paris' Hospital Foundation, which works to better the daily lives of hospitalised children and their families. In addition to acting as presenter, Mika performed a medley of his songs, as well as "Keep It Simple" with Vianney. Also performing at the gala were artists including Blackpink, Pharrell Williams, Pascal Obispo, Kid Cudi, Gautier Capuçon, Khatia Buniatishvili and Daniel Lozakovich. During the evening, appeals for donations were launched by the artists. The show was broadcast on French television on 28 January. The soundtrack for Mika's first film score, for the French-language film Princes of the Desert (Zodi et Tehu, Freres du desert) (2023), directed by Éric Barbier and starring Alexandra Lamy, Youssef Hajdi, and Nadia Benzakour, was released on 3 February 2023. To create the score, Mika worked with 160 musicians from around the world, including celebrated South African artist Nomfundo Moh and classical Berber musicians from Morocco.

On 15 February 2023, a television program called The Piano (2023–), featuring Mika as a judge, began to be broadcast on UK's Channel 4. The series, produced by Love Productions (also responsible for The Great British Bake Off), followed a number of musicians on a journey from playing in public train stations around the UK to the Royal Festival Hall stage. On 25 March, Mika was the featured performer at the 2023 Rose Ball (Bal de la Rose), an annual charity gala that benefits the Princess Grace Foundation; Mika's youngest sister Zuleika accompanied him to this event. In May and June 2023, Mika held three shows in Asia, two in Japan—Osaka on 23 May and Tokyo on 24 May, and one in South Korea at the Seoul Jazz Festival on 26 May. He also performed in the United Kingdom, at the Cheltenham Jazz Festival in April, the Isle of Wight Festival on 18 June, and the Bristol Sounds Music Festival on 21 June. Following these concerts, he performed in numerous European cities during the summer, including Newport, Bristol, Madrid, Athens, and Casablanca.

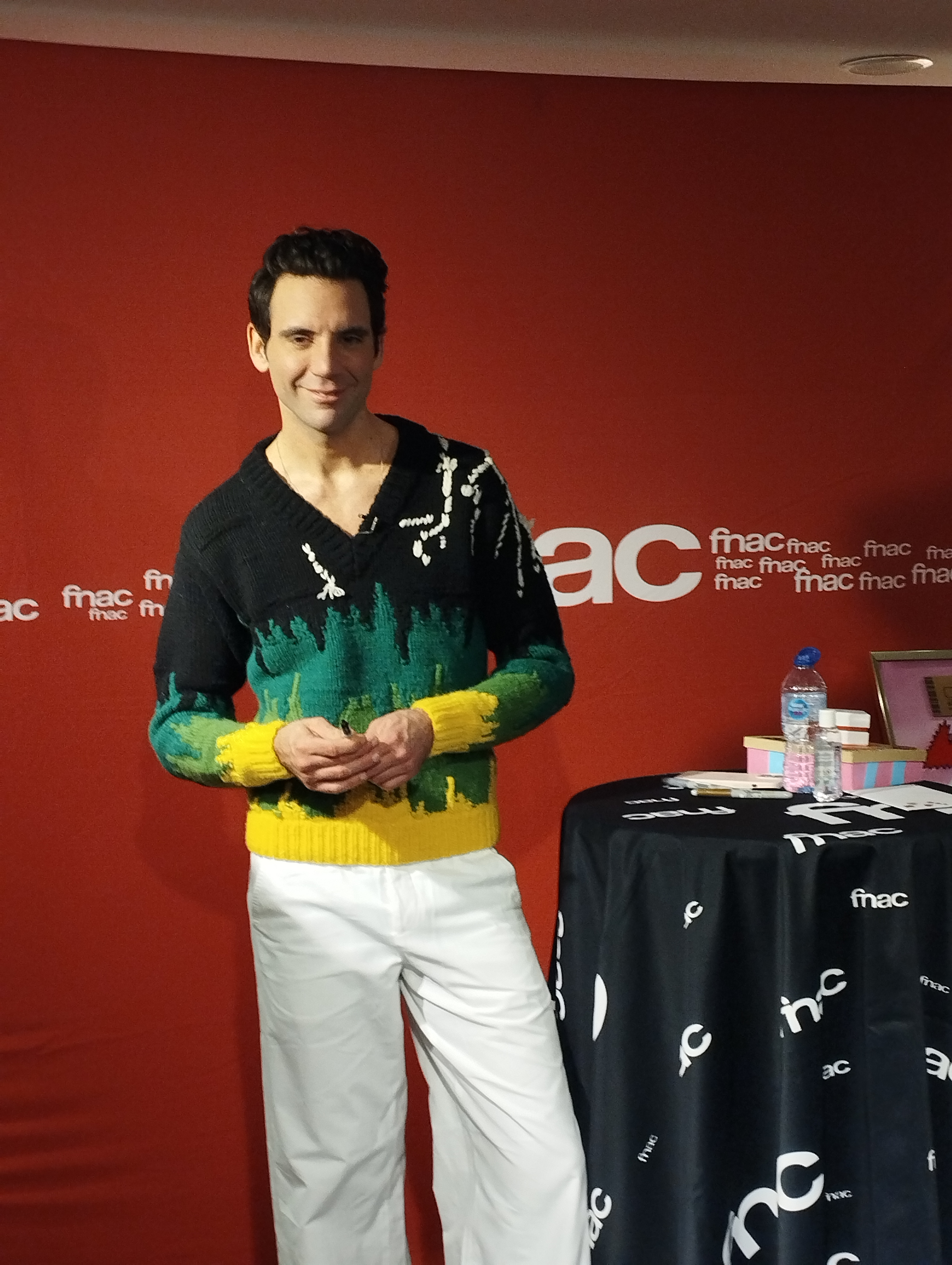
Mika signing autographs at the Fnac in Ternes, France, in December 2023

Mika previewed a new French-language song, "C'est la vie", at the Francofolies de Spa in Belgium, in July. The song was later released as the lead single from his then upcoming French-language sixth studio album on 1 September 2023. The music video for "C'est la vie" consisted of the live performance from Belgium. In mid-October, Mika announced the title of the album as Que ta tete fleurisse toujours (May Your Head Always Bloom). Que ta tete fleurisse toujours was released on 1 December 2023, through Island Def Jam and Universal Music France, and reached number five on the French albums chart.

The album's second single, "Apocalypse Calypso", was released on 18 October 2023. The lyric video for the song premiered a few days later, and the song's music video was released on 3 November 2023. On 8 September, Mika announced a new tour to support Que ta tete fleurisse toujours, the Apocalypse Calypso Tour, starting in March 2024. The tour visited 16 cities in France, with additional stops in Luxembourg, Geneva, Amsterdam, Brussels and Berlin. Mika then took the tour to the UK and Ireland, with stops in Brighton, Manchester, Wolverhampton, London and Dublin.

Beginning in September 2023, Mika worked with the Mêlée des Chœurs on an initiative that combined music and rugby. Students were selected to sing the national anthems of countries participating in the 2023 Rugby World Cup, which started in September, and received guidance from Mika, deemed the "godfather" of the operation. Mika performed alongside a group of children at the final of the Rugby World Cup at the Stade de France on 28 October. Also in October, Mika announced that he would be rejoining The Voice France in 2024, for its thirteenth season, as a judge alongside Vianney, Zazie, and BigFlo and Oli. In December 2023, Mika's appeared on the Christmas special of The Piano, which reunited him with co-judge Lang Lang and host Claudia Winkleman, as well as a number of the performers showcased in the original series. In addition, English comedians Tom Allen and Jo Brand appeared on the program, which also featured a performance by Grammy-winning singer Gregory Porter.

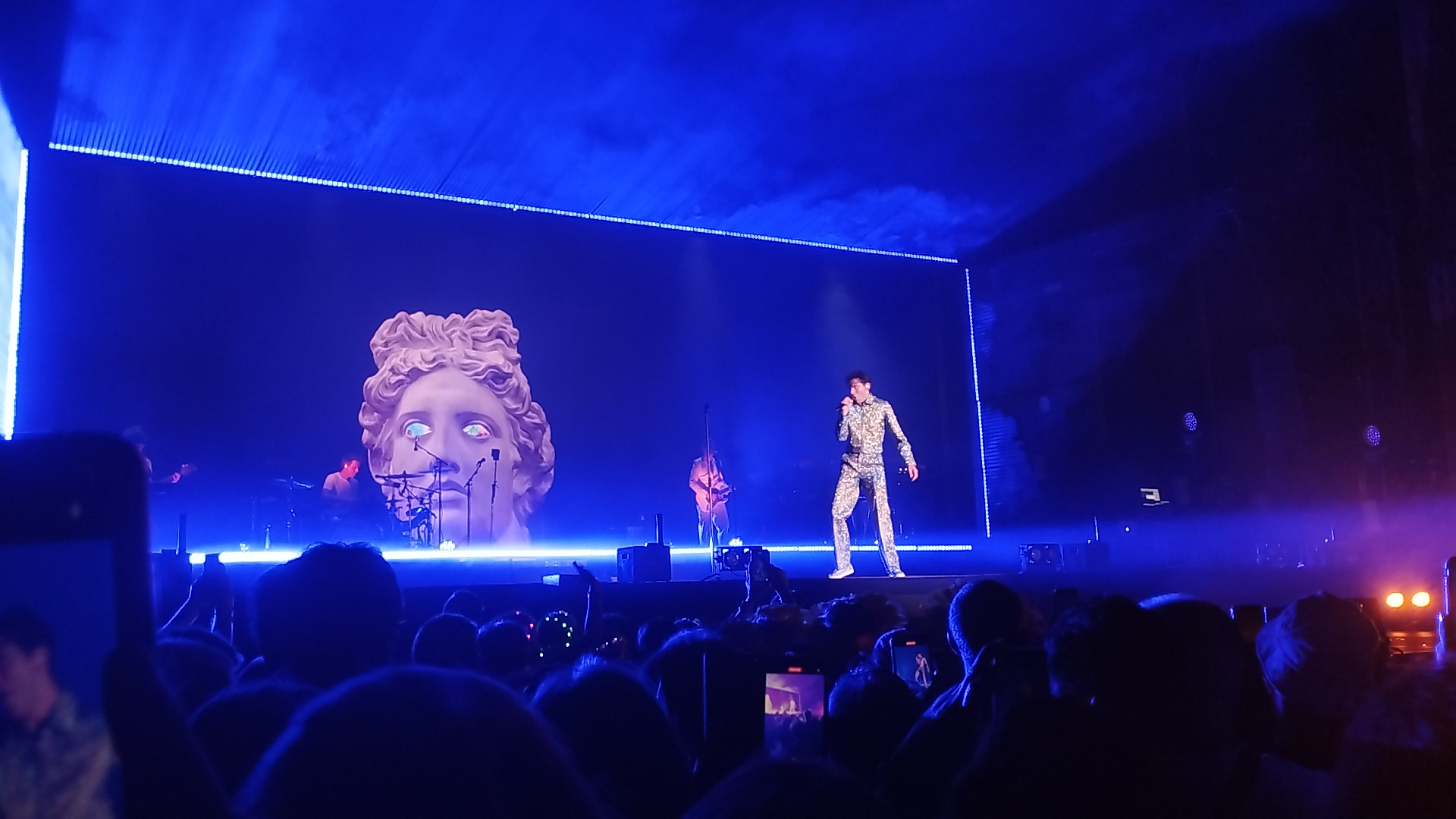
Mika in concert at the Essonne en Scène festival in Chamarande, France, in August 2024

In February 2024, Mika did a series of interviews, appearing on various radio shows and publications, as well as filming for two TV series: The Voice France and The Piano in the UK. The Voice France began airing on 10 February 2024. That same month, Que ta tête fleurisse toujours was named "French-language album of the Year" by Pure Charts Awards (voted on by the public); and The Piano was named "Best Original Programme" at the 2024 Broadcast Awards. In addition, Mika was nominated as "Breakthrough Composer of the Year" by the International Film Music Critics Association (IFMCA) for making "the difficult jump from pop music to film music with his excellent score for the action/adventure (Zodi and Tehu) Princes of the Desert." The Apocalypse Calypso Tour, in support of Que ta tête fleurisse toujours, began in Clermont-Ferrand in France on 26 February, and continued into April. The French leg of the tour culminated on 25 March with Mika's performance at L'Accor Arena in Bercy. The show was filmed and subsequently broadcast on French TV. During the summer of 2024, Mika appeared at a number of festivals around Europe, with stops in France, Belgium, Spain, Germany, Greece, the UK and Italy. He dubbed the summer festival run as "Club Apocalypso Summer Nights." In November 2024, Mika hosted Telethon 2024 in France, during the weekend of 29–30 November, to raise funds for research to cure rare childhood diseases.

=== 2025–present: Hyperlove ===
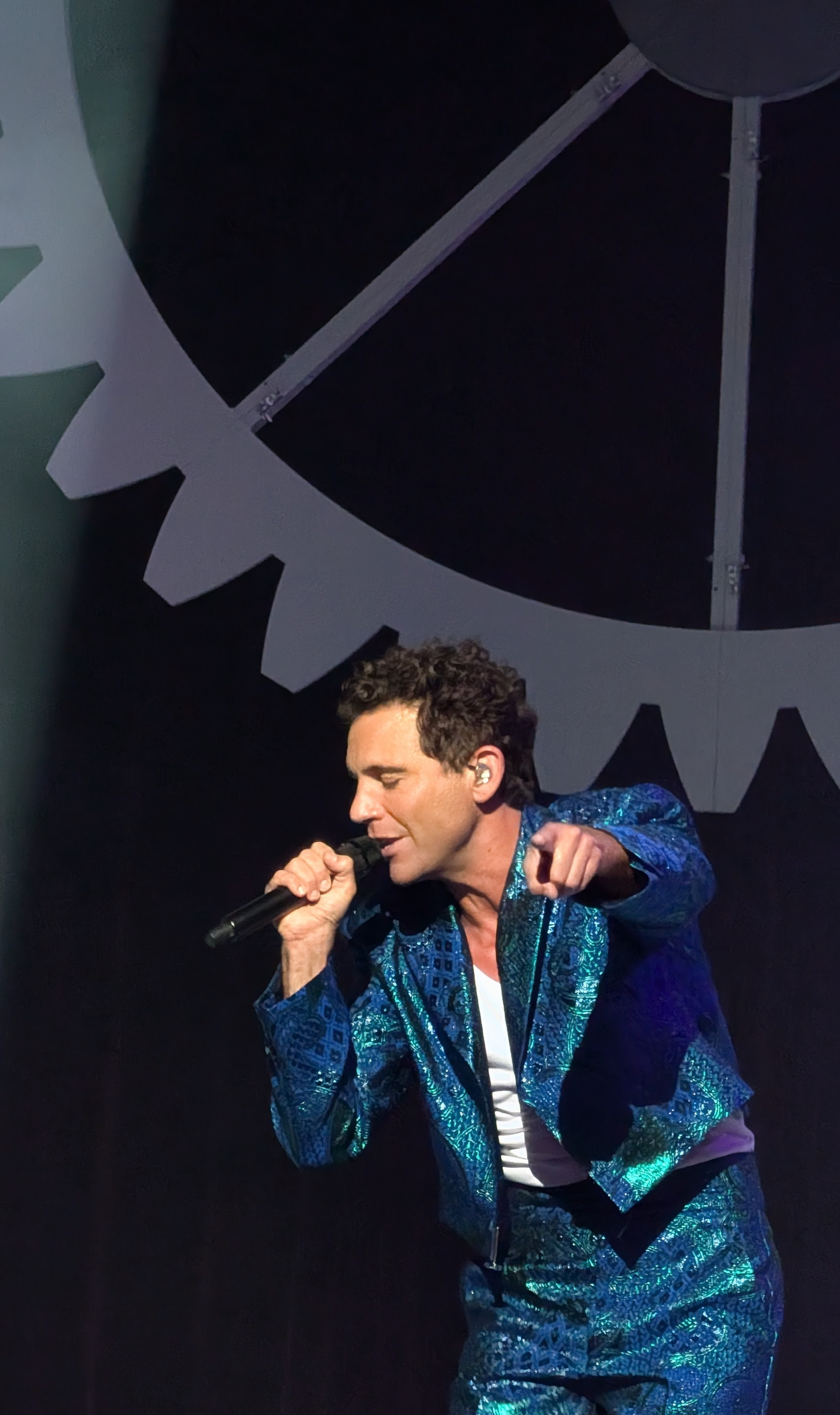
Mika performing in 2026 on the "Spinning Out" tour, performing Hyperlove

Mika acted as co-host alongside Italian actress Elena Sofia Ricci and performed at the David di Donatello film awards in Italy on 7 May 2025. A few weeks later, on 22 May 2025, it was announced that Mika would debut as a coach on The Voice Spain (La Voz) later in the year. On 7 July 2025, he announced a new European tour, called the "Spinning Out Tour", for 2026. The tour news coincided with news of a new, then untitled, album.

Mika's seventh studio, Hyperlove, was released on 23 January 2026; preceded by the singles "Modern Times" and "Immortal Love". It marks his first English-language album in six years, since My Name Is Michael Holbrook (2019). The album's press release describes Hyperlove as "reinvention" for Mika, highlighting his "joyous return to the piano as his creative compass", and explains the concept of the album as being "a forward-looking exploration of how human emotion can coexist with the accelerating velocity of the digital world". Further, it mentions that Hyperlove emerged after the loss of his mother, Joannie Penniman, in 2020, and the presence of his "beloved golden retriever", both of whose "influence is felt across the record". The album received generally positive reviews from music critics, and debuted at number 14 on the UK Albums Chart, becoming his highest charting album in the country since The Boy Who Knew Too Much (2009). Mika embarked on a mini promotional tour during the album's release week, visiting record stores in cities across the United Kingdom. After Mika's "Spinning Out" tour concluded in Europe, Mika took the tour to North America, starting in Boston and ending in Mexico City.

Throughout the summer, Mika performed festival dates throughout Europe, including the Eden Project's Eden Sessions on 12 July 2026.

== Personal life ==
Mika's legal name is Michael Holbrook Penniman Jr., but he was given the nickname Mica by his mother. As he grew older, he changed the "c" to a "k". He has one younger brother and one younger sister, along with two older sisters. His oldest sister Yasmine, who works as an artist under the nom de plume DaWack, painted the cartoon art for his two albums Life in Cartoon Motion and The Boy Who Knew Too Much.

Mika was raised as a Melkite Catholic, and in a 2013 interview he described himself as "still a Roman Catholic". He also acknowledged how the church and its ceremonies influenced his musical training and later work. In addition to English, Mika speaks French, Spanish and Italian fluently; in an interview on 28 September 2009 with The Chris Moyles Show on BBC Radio 1, he commented that he had taken Mandarin Chinese lessons for nine years but does not speak it very well; he also mentioned that his three sisters speak it fluently. He also speaks a little Arabic, in a Lebanese dialect. Mika holds dual UK and US citizenship.

In August 2010, Mika acquired a golden retriever puppy, which he named Melachi (the Witch). Her nickname is Mel or Moo. Several years later, in the spring of 2015, he added a second golden retriever puppy, which he named Amira.

Early in his career, many questions about Mika's sexual orientation arose, but he declined to label himself. In a September 2009 interview in Gay & Night, Mika commented on his sexuality: "I've never ever labelled myself. But having said that, I've never limited my life, I've never limited who I sleep with ... Call me whatever you want. Call me bisexual, if you need a term for me ..." In a March 2010 interview with the London Evening Standard, he stated: "I consider myself label-less because I could fall in love with anybody – literally – any type, any body. I'm not picky."

In an August 2012 interview with the magazine Instinct, the singer came out as gay. In recent years, Mika has been more open about his family life and his personal relationship with film-maker Andreas Dermanis, with whom he has been involved for more than 15 years. In July 2015, posters advertising Mika's upcoming concert in Florence, Italy, were defaced and marked with a homophobic slur. In response to this, Mika and his team launched a campaign against homophobia and the discrimination of the LGBTQ+ community in Italy, posting on social media with the slogan and hashtag #rompiamoilsilenzio (Let's Break the Silence). Mika also wrote about the experience for Italian publications, speaking out against not only homophobia, but bullying in general.

Mika practices transcendental meditation.

Since 2013, Mika has frequently spent time in Italy, where he has a house and a studio in Tuscany in the province of Florence.

== Side projects and endorsements ==
Mika has written songs for other musicians, saying, "I write songs for other people under different names most of the time. I have a little family of three names. One of them has been discovered – it's Alice." One such song, "Ci Parliamo da Grandi", was recorded and made famous by Italian singer Eros Ramazotti.

Mika served as a model for fashion designer Paul Smith's spring/summer 2007 global ad campaign. In 2012 and 2013, Mika served as the face of Lozza sunglasses in advertising campaigns. He also designed a line of sunglasses for the Italian eyewear company. Also in 2013, Mika designed a line of clothing for Belgian retailer JBC. The collection included items for men, women and children. At the time of the line's release, Mika told journalists, "For the menswear collection I took inspiration from my own wardrobe. I like easy to wear, stylish clothing that you can put on quickly in the morning and still look stylish." For the children's and women's collections, Mika took inspiration from his youth. "I grew up in a house with three sisters and was always made to tag along on all kinds of shopping trips." A collection of watches that Mika and his sister Yasmine had designed for Swiss watchmaker Swatch, in honor of the company's 30th anniversary, was revealed in November 2013. The regular edition "Kukulakuku" has a large watch face dominated by blue and comes in a plastic box, while the strictly limited edition "Kukulakuki" has a smaller face dominated by white and comes in a special tin and box.

Mika lent his song "Live Your Life" to the advertising campaign for Spanish beer San Miguel in 2013, appearing in a commercial that doubled as the song's music video. He also appeared in print ads for the brand. Belgian telecommunications company Mobistar featured Mika in an online film in 2014, with him singing "Grace Kelly" in front of a crowd at the Antwerp train station to promote the company's "Have a Nice Day" campaign. The film was accompanied by an in-store poster campaign. Mika did a signing session at the Mobistar concept store in Liege, then performed a concert in Brussels for invitation-only/Mobistar competition winners on 18 September 2014.

Mika is the narrator and voice of the main character, Mustafa, in the 84-minute French-language version of the animated film The Prophet. The film was produced by Salma Hayek and is based on a book of poetry by Lebanese-American writer, poet and visual artist Kahlil Gibran. At the Cannes Film Festival in 2014, Mika joined Hayek, her husband and her daughter (who also voices a character in the French version), and actress Julie Gayet on the red carpet to celebrate the film's launch. The French version was released in theaters in France on 2 December 2015, and on DVD/Blu-ray in August 2016. To promote its theatrical release Hayek and Mika appeared together on the French TV shows C à Vous on 1 December 2015 and Le Grand 8 on 2 December 2015.

In Trieste, Italy, on 11–12 July 2014, Mika and his sister Yasmine were two of the judges for the International Talent Support Contest (ITS). They judged 10 pieces in the Swatch-sponsored "ITS ARTWORK" category.

Mika covered the song "Je Chante" by Charles Trenet for TGV's advertising campaign in 2015, and appeared in a related video/commercial. The song is on Mika's November 2015 reissue of No Place in Heaven as the fifteenth track on the French edition of the album.

In May 2016, Mika and Yasmine unveiled another Swatch watch that they had designed. This Swatch was named Mumu-Cucurrucucu. It has an engraved golden dial with a bright-colored geometric design dominated by white and green, and comes in a box also designed by Mika and his sister.

Mika was part of an advertising campaign for the Peugeot 108 automobile in March 2017. At the time he said, "The new campaign is a fun collision of my world and that of the 108." Also, at the end of 2017, Mika began a collaboration with Pilot pens. He and his sister Yasmine designed a collection of 24 different pens to help celebrate Pilot's 100th anniversary. As part of the promotion for this collaboration, a newly remixed (by Ryan Riback) version of Mika's song "Celebrate" was released and used in advertisements.

Mika became an Opel brand ambassador in Italy in autumn 2020 and starred in a commercial for the Corsa-e in September 2020, one for the 100% electric Mokka-e in October 2020, and one for Opel Grandland X Plug-in-Hybrid in February 2021. All three commercials prominently featured his song "Domani".

At the International Talent Support (ITS) Contest in October 2020, Mika and his sister Yasmine were on the international jury, helping to decide the winners of the ITS Responsible Fashion Award and the ITS Responsible Accessories Award. Due to the global COVID-19 pandemic, the jury met virtually and no in-person event was held. The results were live-streamed on 23 October 2020, but Mika and Yasmine only appeared as photos while the host introduced the jurors.

In October 2021, Mika announced that he had invested in a French company called Divie, which produces products made with CBD oil. Mika noted that he had used CBD for some time, especially on tour, and believed in its benefits.

Mika collaborated with French champagne-maker Nicolas Feuillatte on a special, limited edition brut reserve champagne that was released in October 2024. The campaign was called "Defying Gravity" and advertisements for the champagne featured images of Mika along with his song "Doucement."

== Philanthropy ==
Mika participated in "Children in Need Rocks", a charity event organized by singer Gary Barlow and held at London's Royal Albert Hall ahead of the annual "Children in Need" appeal in 2009. Among those also performing that evening were Sir Paul McCartney, Dame Shirley Bassey, Leona Lewis, members of Take That, Paolo Nutini, Lily Allen, and Muse. The concert was held 12 November and was broadcast on BBC1 and Radio 2.

Also in November 2009, Mika performed an acoustic concert at London's Union Chapel as part of the "Little Noise Sessions" organised by the charity Mencap. Singing alongside Mika during this concert was the a cappella group The King's Singers.

Mika and his sister Yasmine worked on a special project for Coca-Cola in early 2010, designing an artistic, limited edition aluminium Coke bottle that also benefited charity. The "Happiness Bottle" was, according to Mika, inspired by Japanese psychedelic posters from the 1960s. It has a red background and features a bright yellow sun along with some tribal figures and other symbols. There was also a collector's version of the bottle that was packaged in a decorated box that opened to show a 3D scene. Mika talked about the project at the time, saying, "When I said yes to Coca-Cola for this project, one of the conditions that I had, and I was very clear about this since the beginning, was that I wanted to have a charity side attached to it. So I said: OK, I'll draw this bottle, but all the money that they would pay me will go to a charity. So I chose Hôpitaux de France and Hôpitaux de Paris, and particularly their 'Maison des adolescents' project. This charity side for me was the most important of all."

Mika teamed up with some of the biggest names in pop to record a cover version of REM's 'Everybody Hurts' in support of charities helping relief efforts after an earthquake hit the island of Haiti in early 2010. Mika played piano and shared vocals with Mariah Carey, Kylie Minogue, Jon Bon Jovi, Rod Stewart, Michael Buble and Susan Boyle. The track was organised by Simon Cowell and The Sun newspaper. Mika also donated various pieces of memorabilia for auction to raise additional funds for Haiti, including a milk carton prop used in his video for the single "Rain", as well as the t-shirt he wore in the Haiti video, plus an autographed CD single of "Everybody Hurts". At the time, Mika said on his website, "I was hugely honoured to be asked by The Sun to be part of this single. I am really pleased with how it turned out, it sounds fantastic, and I hope the public will support it to raise money for this worthy cause." He also donated a signed poster to the charity Oxfam UK to help raise funds for its work in Haiti.

In 2012, Mika offered tickets and flights to one of his shows anywhere in the world to raise money for the UK charity London's Air Ambulance, in conjunction with members of the Mika Fan Club (MFC). The resulting raffle raised more than £6,600.

In both 2012 and 2013, Mika contributed some of his doodles to the UK charity Epilepsy Action's National Doodle Day auction. His doodles raised more than £1000 for the organization.

Mika participated in the televised January 2013 Les Enfoirés, a yearly charity show, at Bercy Arena in France. Several of the songs he performed on appear on the Les Enfoirés 2-disc CD La Boîte À Musique Des Enfoirés released September 2013 and the single disc DVD released in March 2013.

For Christmas 2014, Mika contributed a design to a collection of Christmas cards sold in Italy, the proceeds of which went to the European Association for Research in Surgical Oncology. The original design was also auctioned off for charity, raising €1,075.

Mika has been a long-time supporter of the French charitable organisation Imagine for Margo/Children without Cancer. In 2014 and 2015, he and the late photographer Peter Lindbergh worked together on an advertising campaign for the charity. Mika's image continues to be used in ads for the organisation and in December 2020 Mika performed a concert to benefit the charity at the pediatric department of the French Institut Curie that was broadcast live on Facebook.

In December 2015, Mika visited Lebanon with UNHCR, the UN Refugee Agency, and spent time with refugees who had been forced to flee their homes during the ongoing conflict in Syria. Since then, he has made several video messages in support of this organisation and in November 2017 was a special guest at a UNHCR charity event held in Milan.

Mika hosted the charity show Le Gala des Pieces Jaunes at the Zénith in Paris in support of the Hospital Foundation in late January 2023. In addition to presenting, Mika performed a medley of his songs, along with a new single, 'Keep It Simple' featuring Vianney. Also performing at the gala were South Korean girl group Blackpink, Pharrell Williams, Pascal Obispo, Kid Cudi, Gautier Capuçon, Khatia Buniatishvili and Daniel Lozakovich. During the evening, appeals for donations were launched by the artists: the contributions of each one making it possible to change the daily life of hospitalised children and their families. The show was later broadcast on French TV channel France2.

Mika hosted Telethon 2024 in France the weekend of 29–30 November, to raise funds for research to cure rare childhood diseases. The campaign raised more than €96 million.

== Discography ==
- Life in Cartoon Motion (2007)
- The Boy Who Knew Too Much (2009)
- The Origin of Love (2012)
- No Place in Heaven (2015)
- My Name Is Michael Holbrook (2019)
- Zodi & Téhu, frères du désert (soundtrack) (2023)
- Que ta tête fleurisse toujours (2023)
- Hyperlove (2026)

== Filmography ==
- Live in Cartoon Motion (2007)
- Live Parc des Princes Paris (2008)
- Cadences obstinées (2014), as Lucio
- The Prophet (2015), voice of Mustafa for the French version
- Mika Love Paris – Live a Bercy (2016)
- Sinfonia Pop (2016)

== Tours ==
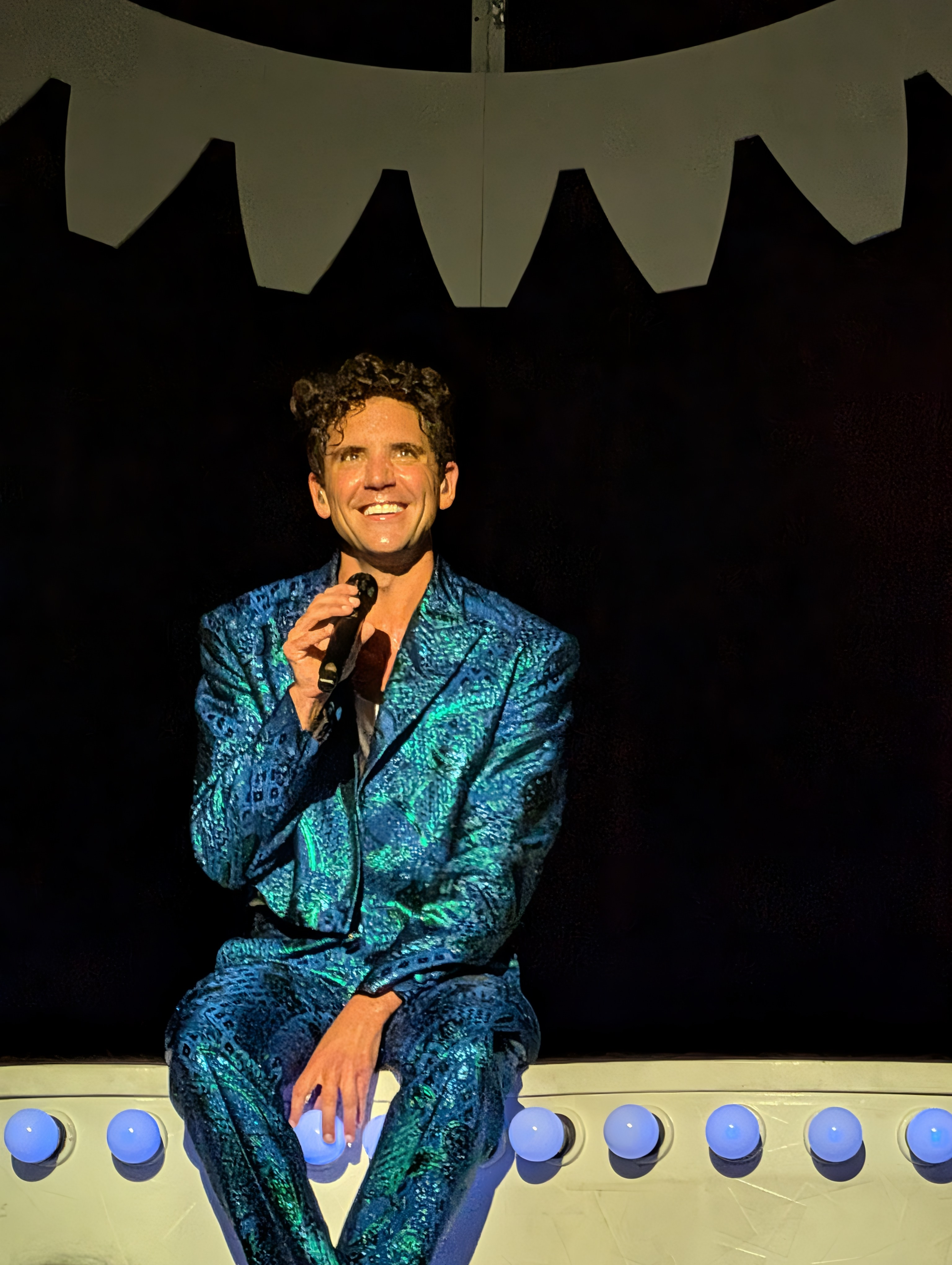
Mika performing on the Spinning Out tour in 2026

- Dodgy Holiday Tour (2007–2008)
- Songs for Sorrow Acoustic Tour (2009)
- 1955 Tour (2009)
- Imaginarium Tour (2010)
- The Origin of Love Tour (2012)
- An Intimate Evening (2013)
- Heaven Tour (2015–2016)
- Tiny Love Tiny Tour (2019)
- Revelation Tour (2019–2020)
- For the Rite of Spring (2022)
- Apocalypse Calypso Tour (2024)
- Spinning Out (2026)

== Awards and nominations ==
In March 2010, Mika became the youngest person ever to be honoured with the French Order of Arts and Letters with the rank of knight (chevalier) for services to music. In recognition of his efforts for aiding Lebanon via the "I Love Beirut" concert, Mika received the Order of Merit of Lebanon in January 2021.

Mika has also been nominated for and won many other awards and honors in the music industry:

Award	Year	Category	Nominee(s)	Result	Ref.
Amadeus Austrian Music Awards	2008	Best International Single	"Grace Kelly"	Nominated	
Attitude Awards	2019	The Music Award	Mika	Won	
BBC Sound of...	2007	Sound of 2007	Mika	Won	
BT Digital Music Awards	2007	Best Pop Artist	Mika	Nominated	
Bravo Otto Awards (Hungary)	2007	Newcomer of the Year	Mika	Nominated	
Brit Awards	2008	British Single of the Year	"Grace Kelly"	Nominated	
Brit Awards	2008	British Album of the Year	Life in Cartoon Motion	Nominated	
Brit Awards	2008	British Breakthrough Act	Mika	Won	
Brit Awards	2008	British Male Solo Artist	Mika	Nominated	
Brit Awards	2010	British Male Solo Artist	Mika	Nominated	
British LGBT Awards	2023	Music Artist	Mika	Nominated	
Capital FM's Awards	2008	Favorite UK Male Artist	Mika	Won	
Capital FM's Awards	2008	Favorite UK Album	Life in Cartoon Motion	Won	
Coca-Cola Onstage Awards	2017	Best International Pop Show	Mika	Won	
Coca-Cola Onstage Awards	2020	Best International Artist	Mika	Won	
Danish Music Awards	2008	Foreign Newcomer of the Year	Mika	Won	
ECHO Awards	2008	Best International Newcomer	Mika	Won	
ECHO Awards	2008	Best International Male	Mika	Nominated	
Flaiano Prizes	2018	Best Television Programm	Stasera casa Mika	Won	
Denmark Gaffa Awards	2020	Best Foreign Solo Act	Mika	Nominated	
Denmark Gaffa Awards	2020	Best Foreign Album	My Name Is Michael Holbrook	Nominated	
GLAAD Media Award	2020	Outstanding Music Artist	My Name Is Michael Holbrook	Nominated	
Gay Music Chart Awards	2015	Best British Music Video	"Good Guys"	Won	
Grammy Awards	2008	Best Dance Recording	"Love Today"	Nominated	
IFMCA Awards	2023	Breakthrough Composer of the Year	Zodi and Tehu, Princes of the Desert soundtrack	Nominated	
IFPI Hong Kong Top Sales Music Awards	2007	Top 10 Best Selling Foreign Albums	Life in Cartoon Motion	Won	
International Dance Music Awards	2008	Best Dance Music Video	"Grace Kelly"	Nominated	
Ivor Novello Awards	2008	Songwriter of the Year	Mika	Won	
Ivor Novello Awards	2008	Best Selling British Song	"Grace Kelly"	Nominated	
Los Premios 40 Principales	2007	Best International Song	"Grace Kelly"	Nominated	
Los Premios 40 Principales	2007	Best International Artist	Mika	Nominated	
MTV Asia Awards	2008	Favorite Breakthrough Artist	Mika	Nominated	
MTV Australia Awards	2008	Video of the Year	"Happy Ending"	Nominated	
MTV Europe Music Awards	2007	Most Addictive Track	"Grace Kelly"	Nominated	
MTV Europe Music Awards	2007	Best Solo Act	Mika	Nominated	
MTV Europe Music Awards	2009	Best Male	Mika	Nominated	
MTV Italian Music Awards	2008	Man of the Year	Mika	Nominated	
MTV Italian Music Awards	2010	Man of the Year	Mika	Nominated	
MTV Italian Music Awards	2011	Too Much Award	Mika	Nominated	
MTV Italian Music Awards	2015	#MTVAwardsStar	Mika	Nominated	
MTV Video Music Awards Japan	2008	Best New Artist in a Video	"Grace Kelly"	Nominated	
NME Awards	2008	Worst Dressed	Mika	Nominated	
NME Awards	2008	Worst Album	Life in Cartoon Motion	Nominated	
NRJ Music Awards	2008	International Song of the Year	"Relax, Take It Easy"	Nominated	
NRJ Music Awards	2008	Music Video of the Year	"Relax, Take It Easy"	Nominated	
NRJ Music Awards	2008	International Album of the Year	Life in Cartoon Motion	Nominated	
NRJ Music Awards	2008	International Revelation of the Year	Mika	Won	
NRJ Music Awards	2010	International Male Artist of the Year	Mika	Nominated	
NRJ Music Awards	2012	International Male Artist of the Year	Mika	Won	
NRJ Music Awards	2012	International Song of the Year	"Elle me dit"	Nominated	
NRJ Music Awards	2012	Music Video of the Year	"Elle me dit"	Nominated	
Nickelodeon Australian Kids' Choice Awards	2007	Fave International Singer	Mika	Nominated	
Nickelodeon UK Kids' Choice Awards	2007	Best Music Video	"Grace Kelly"	Nominated	
Nickelodeon UK Kids' Choice Awards	2007	Best Male Singer	Mika	Nominated	
Nickelodeon UK Kids' Choice Awards	2008	Best Singer	Mika	Nominated	
Q Awards	2007	Best Breakthrough Act	Mika	Nominated	
Q Awards	2009	Best Video	"We Are Golden"	Nominated	
RTHK International Pop Poll Awards	2008	Top Male Artist	Mika	Gold	
RTHK International Pop Poll Awards	2008	Top New Act	Mika	Gold	
RTHK International Pop Poll Awards	2008	Top Ten International Gold Songs	"Grace Kelly"	Won	
RTHK International Pop Poll Awards	2010	Top Ten International Gold Songs	"Blame It on the Girls"	Won	
RTHK International Pop Poll Awards	2010	Himself	Top Male Artist	Bronze	
RTHK International Pop Poll Awards	2016	Top Ten International Gold Songs	"Talk About You"	Nominated	
Radio Disney Music Awards	2014	Best Musical Collaboration	"Popular Song" (feat. Ariana Grande)	Nominated	
Rose d'Or	2017	Best Entertainment Series	Stasera casa Mika	Won	
Silver Palm - Order of Merit	2021	Lebanese National Award	Mika	Won	
Swiss Music Awards	2008	Best International Newcomer	Mika	Nominated	
TMF Awards	2008	Best International Pop	Mika	Won	
TMF Awards	2008	Best International Male	Mika	Nominated	
TMF Awards	2008	Best International New	Mika	Nominated	
Teen Choice Awards	2007	Choice Male Breakout Artist	Mika	Nominated	
The Record of the Year	2007	Record of the Year	"Grace Kelly"	Nominated	
Tokio Hot 100 Awards	2009	Best Male Artist	Mika	Nominated	
UK Festival Awards	2007	Best Festival Pop Act	Mika	Nominated	
UK Music Video Awards	2009	Best Art Direction in a Video	"We Are Golden"	Nominated	
Victoires de la Musique	2012	Original Song of the Year	"Elle me dit"	Nominated	
Virgin Media Music Awards	2007	Best UK Act	Mika	Nominated	
Virgin Media Music Awards	2007	Most Fanciable Male	Mika	Nominated	
Virgin Media Music Awards	2007	Best Track	"Grace Kelly"	Nominated	
Vodafone Live Music Awards	2007	Best Live Male	Mika	Won	
World Music Awards	2007	World's Best Selling New Artist	Mika	Won	
World Music Awards	2007	World's Best Selling Pop/Rock Male Artist	Mika	Won	
World Music Awards	2007	World's Best Selling British Artist	Mika	Won	
World Music Awards	2014	World's Best Live Act	Mika	Nominated	
World Music Awards	2014	World's Best Male Act	Mika	Nominated	
World Music Awards	2014	World's Best Entertainer	Mika	Nominated	
World Music Awards	2014	World's Best Song	"Popular Song" (feat. Ariana Grande)	Nominated	
World Music Awards	2014	World's Best Video	"Popular Song" (feat. Ariana Grande)	Nominated	
World Music Awards	2014	World's Best Video	"Underwater"	Nominated	
World Music Awards	2014	World's Best Song	"Underwater"	Nominated	
World Music Awards	2014	World's Best Album	The Origin of Love	Nominated	
World Music Awards	2014	World's Best Album	Songbook Vol. 1	Nominated	
Žebřík Music Awards	2007	Himself	Best International Discovery	Nominated	
Žebřík Music Awards	2007	Himself	Best International Male	Nominated	
Žebřík Music Awards	2009	Himself	Best International Male	Nominated	
Žebřík Music Awards	2009	"Rain"	Best International Song	Nominated	
Žebřík Music Awards	2014	"Boum Boum Boum"	Best International Video	Nominated	

== Notes ==
Preceded by (Netherlands) Chantal Janzen, Edsilia Rombley, Jan Smit and Nikkie de Jager	Eurovision Song Contest presenter 2022; With: Alessandro Cattelan and Laura Pausini	Succeeded by (United Kingdom) Alesha Dixon, Hannah Waddingham, (Ukraine) Julia Sanina and (Republic of Ireland) Graham Norton (final)
