= 1955 Tour =

2009 concert tour by Mika

- Tour by Mika
- Associated album: The Boy Who Knew Too Much
- Start date: 12 October 2009
- End date: 30 November 2009
- Legs: 3
- No. of shows: 10 in North America; 1 in Australia; 3 Asia; 14 (total)

Mika concert chronology
- Dodgy Holiday Tour (2007); 1955 Tour (2009); Imaginarium Tour (2010)

The 1955 Tour was the second concert tour by British pop singer-songwriter Mika in support of his second studio album The Boy Who Knew Too Much. The tour spanned across North America, Australia and the Far East.

In February 2010 Mika launched another tour, the Imaginarium Tour which started in Belfast, Northern Ireland and took him throughout Europe and back to Asia.

== Background ==
Mika announced the official name of his tour on 4 October 2009 while in rehearsals for the North American leg. The tour had an outer space theme.

The idea behind this tour was that a civilian sent into space became lost after something went terribly wrong with the mission. When the show started, attendees learned that the civilian-turned-astronaut lost in space was Mika.

The shows opened with the band in a living room-like setting, watching a fake news report on TV. Actor Ian McKellen served as the narrator for this fake news show. Large styrofoam balls painted to look like planets (some painted by fans) were suspended from the ceiling around the set. Mika usually came onstage from a higher place dressed like an astronaut. He gradually came to the floor, took off the space suit, then changed into a black & white suit. The band for this tour was usually backing singer iMMa, drummer Cherisse Ofusu-Osei, keyboardist David Whitmey, bass player Jimmy Sims, and guitarist Martin Waugh, and they usually wore black & white or neon costumes. On the North American leg of the tour the opening act was Gary Go.

== Setlist ==
North American Tour Setlist

Setlist from the Fox Theatre Show, 13 October:

- 1. "Rain"
- 2. "Big Girl (You Are Beautiful)"
- 3. "Stuck in the Middle"
- 4. "Blame It on the Girls"
- 5. "Billy Brown"
- 6. "Any Other World"
- 7. "Blue Eyes"
- 8. "Touches You"
- 9. "I See You"
- 10. "Dr. John"
- 11. "Good Gone Girl"
- 12. "Happy Ending"
- 13. "Love Today"
- 14. "Relax (Take It Easy)"
- 15. "We Are Golden"

Encore

- 16. "Toy Boy"
- 17. "Grace Kelly"
- 18. "Lollipop"
Australasian Tour Setlist

Setlist from the Seoul, Korea, 28 November 2009:

- 1. "Relax (Take It Easy)"
- 2. "Big Girl (You Are Beautiful)"
- 3. "Stuck in the Middle"
- 4. "Dr. John"
- 5. "Blue Eyes"
- 6. "Touches You"
- 7. "Pick Up Off the Floor"
- 8. "One Foot Boy"
- 9. "Blame It on the Girls"
- 10. "Happy Ending"
- 11. "Billy Brown"
- 12. "I See You"
- 13. "Rain"
- 14. "Love Today"
- 15. "We Are Golden"

Encore:

- 16. "Toy Boy"
- 17. "Grace Kelly"
- 18. "Lollipop"

== Tour dates ==
Date	City	Country	Opening act	Venue
North America
12 October 2009	Toronto	Canada	Gary Go	The Sound Academy
13 October 2009	Montreal	Canada	Gary Go	Place des Arts
15 October 2009	Boston	United States	Gary Go	Orpheum Theatre
16 October 2009	New York City	United States	Gary Go	United Palace
18 October 2009	Philadelphia	United States	Gary Go	Electric Factory
20 October 2009	Chicago	United States	Gary Go	Riviera Theatre
23 October 2009	Los Angeles	United States	Gary Go	Hollywood Palladium
24 October 2009	Oakland	United States	Gary Go	Fox Oakland Theatre
26 October 2009	Seattle	United States	Gary Go	Moore Theatre
27 October 2009	Vancouver	Canada	Gary Go	Commodore Ballroom
Australia
24 November 2009	Sydney	Australia	Orianthi	Enmore Theatre
Asia
26 November 2009	Hong Kong		—	Star Hall
28 November 2009	Seoul	South Korea	—	Ax Hall
30 November 2009	Tokyo	Japan	—	Studio Coast
