= Immortal Love (song) =

Single by Mika

from the album Hyperlove
- B-side: "Modern Times"
- Released: 5 December 2025
- Recorded: 2025
- Genre: Pop
- Length: 2:56
- Label: Republic
- Songwriter: Mika
- Producers: Mika; Nicholas Littlemore; Peter Mayes

Mika singles chronology
"Modern Times" (2025)	"Immortal Love" (2025)	"Excuses For Love" (2026)

Music video
- "Immortal Love" on YouTube

"Immortal Love" is a song by the British singer-songwriter Mika, from his seventh studio album Hyperlove (2026). It was released on 5 December 2025, as the second single from the album, by Republic Records. Mika wrote the track, and co-produced it alongside Nicholas Littlemore, with Peter Mayes providing additional production. "Immortal Love" is a pop song, with elements of electropop, dance-pop and alternative rock. Lyrically, the song reflects on connection and unconditional love.

The music video for "Immortal Love" was released on 19 December 2025. Directed by Nick Bartleet, the video is set in an office building, with several different versions of Mika in suit and tie, while the machinery is flickering along with the song’s beat. Commercially, the song peaked at number 27 on the UK Airplay Chart, his highest position on the chart for more than a decade. Mika performed the song for the first time on 26 January 2026 in Kingston upon Thames, England, at Banquet Records, during his mini promotional tour for Hyperlove.

== Personnel ==
Credits are adapted from Apple Music.

- Mika – songwriter, producer, lead vocals
- Nicholas Littlemore – producer
- Peter Mayes – additional producer
- Ida Falk Winland - background vocals
- Nicky Muroch - guitar
- Tim Van Der Kuil - guitar
- Peter Randall - bass
- Reuben James - synthesiser
- Alex Stacey – engineer, synth bass
- Jake Prein – engineer
- Marc-Antoine Joly – engineer
- Daniel Cinelli – engineer
- Raffaele Stefani – engineer
- Serban Ghenea – mixing engineer
- Bryce Bordone – assistant mixing engineer
- Chris Gehringer – mastering engineer
- John Hanes – immersive mixing engineer

== Charts ==
=== Weekly charts ===
Weekly chart performance for "Immortal Love"
Chart (2026)	Peak position
UK Airplay (Radiomonitor)	27

== Release history ==
"Disease" release history
Region	Date	Format(s)	Version(s)	Label	Ref.
Various	5 December 2025	Digital download; streaming	Original	Republic	
