= Daniel Lozakovich =

Swedish classical violinist (born 2001)

- Born: Daniel Lozakovitj; 1 April 2001 (age 25); Stockholm, Sweden
- Occupation: Classical violinist
- Label: Deutsche Grammophon
- Website: lozakovich.com

Daniel Lozakovich (born 1 April 2001) is a Swedish classical violinist. He made his concert debut aged 9 under Vladimir Spivakov in Moscow, and was signed by Deutsche Grammophon at the age of 15 in 2016. He has released 5 albums as of 2024.

== Life and career ==
Daniel Lozakovitj was born in Stockholm to a Belarusian father and a Kyrgyz mother. He began playing the violin at the age of six, later enrolling at Karlsruhe University of Music to study with Professor Josef Rissin in 2012, and since 2015 has been mentored by Eduard Wulfson in Geneva. In 2016, he was the winner of the Vladimir Spivakov International Violin Competition, and soon after, was a returning soloist with the Mariinsky Orchestra under Valery Gergiev in the closing concert of the XV Moscow Easter Festival. He signed an exclusive contract with Deutsche Grammophon in June 2016, making him the youngest member at the time on the label's roster at the age of 15.

Lozakovich's first full recording for Deutsche Grammophon, made with the Kammerorchester des Symphonieorchesters des Bayerischen Rundfunks, was released in June 2018 and featured Bach's two concertos for violin and orchestra (BWV 1041 and 1042), and his Partita No.2 in D minor BWV 1004 for solo violin. His debut album reached No.1 in the French Amazon charts, and No.1 in Germany's classical album chart.

Lozakovich's second album, None but the Lonely Heart, was released in October 2019. In February 2023, Mark Pullinger from Gramophone named this recording as Top Choice spanning 70 years of best recordings of Tchaikovsky's Violin Concerto.

In 2020, he joined forces with Gergiev and the Münchner Philharmoniker to celebrate the 250th anniversary of Beethoven's birth with a live recording of the composer's Violin Concerto.

Lozakovich currently plays both the Ex-Baron Rothschild Stradivarius on a loan on behalf of the owner by Reuning & Son (Boston) and Eduard Wulfson, and the Le Reynier Stradivari (1727), which was loaned by the LVMH group.

He was invited to perform at the state dinner at the Palace of Versailles on 20 September 2023 during Charles III's state visit to France.

Lozakovich performed along with the Orchestre philharmonique de Radio France conducted by Gustavo Dudamel at the reopening ceremony of Notre-Dame after its reconstruction.

== Discography ==
- Johann Sebastian Bach: Violin Concertos Nos. 1 & 2, Partita No. 2 (2018). Kammerorchester des Symphonieorchesters des Bayerischen Rundfunks. DG
- Tchaikovsky: None but the Lonely Heart (2019). National Philharmonic of Russia, Vladimir Spivakov. DG
- Beethoven: Violin Concerto (2020). Münchner Philharmoniker, Valery Gergiev. DG [live recording, Beethoven 250th anniversary]
- Spirits (2023). Stanislav Soloviev. DG
- Grieg, Franck, Shor-Pletnev, Shostakovich. (2024). Mikhail Pletnev. Warner Classics.
