= Que ta tête fleurisse toujours =

Studio album by Mika
- Released: 1 December 2023
- Recorded: 2021–2023
- Genre: French pop; Europop
- Length: 37:16
- Language: French
- Label: Island Def Jam; Universal
- Producer: Marsō; Martin Lefebvre; Renaud Rebillaud; Tristan Salvati

Mika chronology
Zodi et Téhu, frères du désert (2023)	Que ta tête fleurisse toujours (2023)	Hyperlove (2026)

Singles from Que ta tête fleurisse toujours
- 1. "C'est la Vie" Released: 1 September 2023; 2. "Apocalypse Calypso" Released: 19 October 2023; 3. "Jane Birkin" Released: 17 November 2023

Professional ratings
Review scores
Source	Rating
Irish Examiner	4/5 stars

Que ta tête fleurisse toujours (transl. May your head always bloom) is the sixth studio album by British singer-songwriter Mika, released on 1 December 2023 through Island Def Jam and Universal Music France.

== Background and promotion ==
Mika named the album after a phrase often repeated to him by his mother, Joannie Penniman, who died in 2021 from brain cancer. The album marks his first in French and was preceded by the singles "C'est la Vie" (released in September 2023), "Apocalypse Calypso" (released in October), and "Jane Birkin" (released in November). The singer embarked on the Apocalypse Calypso Tour starting in February 2024 to promote the album in Europe.

== Track listing ==
Que ta tête fleurisse toujours track listing
No.	Title	Writer(s)	Producer(s)	Length
1.	"Bougez"	Michael Holbrook Penniman Jr.; Renaud Rebillaud; Valérie Lemercier; Doriand	Rebillaud	3:17
2.	"Jane Birkin"	Penniman Jr.; Rebillaud; Carla De Coignac	Rebillaud; Marsō	3:16
3.	"Sweetie banana"	Penniman Jr.; Rebillaud; Doriand	Rebillaud	2:56
4.	"Apocalypse Calypso"	Penniman Jr.; Rebillaud; De Coignac; Marsō	Rebillaud; Marsō; Mattyeux	3:16
5.	"30 secondes"	Penniman Jr.; Rebillaud; De Coignac; Skyler Stonestreet	Rebillaud; Marsō	3:09
6.	"C'est la Vie"	Penniman Jr.; Doriand; Tristan Salvati	Salvati	3:28
7.	"Moi, Andy et Paris"	Penniman Jr.; Rebillaud; Doriand	Rebillaud; Marsō	3:35
8.	"Je sais que je t'aime"	Penniman Jr.; Rebillaud; De Coignac	Rebillaud	2:51
9.	"Doucement"	Penniman Jr.; Rebillaud; Doriand	Rebillaud; Marsō	3:11
10.	"Touche Touche"	Penniman Jr.; Rebillaud; Doriand; De Coignac; Salvati	Salvati; Martin Lefebvre	2:25
11.	"Amour pirate"	Penniman Jr.; Rebillaud; Doriand	Rebillaud; Marsō	2:59
12.	"Passager"	Penniman Jr.; Rebillaud; De Coignac	Rebillaud	2:50

Japanese edition track
No.	Title	Writer(s)	Producer(s)	Length
13.	"C'est la Vie" (kids choir version; with La Maîtrise populaire)	Penniman Jr.; Doriand; Salvati	Salvati	3:28

== Charts ==
=== Weekly charts ===
Weekly chart performance for Que ta tête fleurisse toujours
Chart (2023)	Peak position
Belgian Albums (Ultratop Flanders)	73
Belgian Albums (Ultratop Wallonia)	3
French Albums (SNEP)	5
Swiss Albums (Schweizer Hitparade)	8

=== Year-end charts ===
2023 year-end chart performance for Que ta tête fleurisse toujours
Chart (2023)	Position
French Albums (SNEP)	180

2024 year-end chart performance for Que ta tête fleurisse toujours
Chart (2024)	Position
French Albums (SNEP)	192
