= Mika discography =

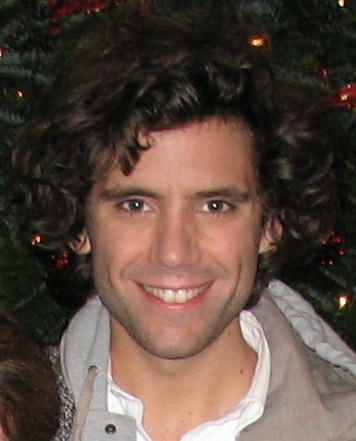
- Mika in 2009
- Studio albums: 7
- Extended plays: 9
- Live albums: 4
- Compilation albums: 2
- Singles: 36
- Video albums: 4
- Music videos: 33

The discography of Mika, a pop singer-songwriter, consists of seven studio albums, four live albums, two compilation albums, nine extended plays, thirty-six singles, thirty-three music videos, and four video albums. As of 2017, Mika has sold over 20 million records.

Mika's debut single, "Relax, Take It Easy", was released in the United Kingdom in 2006. The Dodgy Holiday EP was also made available for download. His second single, "Grace Kelly", was released in January 2007 and debuted at number one on the UK Singles Chart, followed by his debut album, Life in Cartoon Motion, in February 2007. Other singles released were "Love Today", "Big Girl (You Are Beautiful)", "Happy Ending", and "Lollipop". Prior to the release of his second album, Mika released a limited-edition EP entitled Songs for Sorrow in June 2009.

Mika's second album, The Boy Who Knew Too Much, followed in September 2009. The first single from the album, "We Are Golden", made its debut at number four in the UK. "Rain" and "Blame It on the Girls" were released as the second and third UK singles with both peaking at number seventy-two. Mika also recorded the title track from the official soundtrack for the 2010 film Kick-Ass.

The third album, The Origin of Love, first released in September 2012. There were five singles from the album. The first was "Elle me dit" (English: She Tells Me); followed by "Celebrate", featuring Pharrell Williams, then "Underwater", "Origin of Love", and "Popular Song". In the UK, the album peaked at number 24 on the UK Albums Chart.

== Albums ==
=== Studio albums ===
List of studio albums, with selected chart positions, sales figures and certifications
Title	Album details	Peak chart positions														Certifications	Sales
Title	Album details	UK	AUS	AUT	BEL (WA)	BEL (FL)	CAN	FRA	GER	IRE	ITA	NLD	NOR	SWI	US	Certifications	Sales
Life in Cartoon Motion	Released: 5 February 2007; Label: Casablanca; Formats: CD, digital download	1	5	6	1	1	2	1	6	2	9	1	1	1	29	UK: 6× Platinum; AUS: 2× Platinum; AUT: Platinum; CAN: 2× Platinum; FRA: Diamond; GER: Platinum; IRE: 3× Platinum; ITA: Platinum; NLD: Platinum; SWI: 2× Platinum	UK: 1,660,000; US: 350,000
The Boy Who Knew Too Much	Released: 18 September 2009; Label: Casablanca; Formats: CD, digital download	4	10	9	3	3	14 (Note: In Canada, the deluxe version of The Boy Who Knew Too Much charted separately from the original version, at number 19 on the Canadian Albums Chart. Both versions debuted on the chart dated 10 October 2009, as published by Billboard.)	1	6	14	10	5	29	2	19	UK: Platinum; CAN: Gold; FRA: 3× Platinum; ITA: Platinum; SWI: Gold; BEL: Platinum	UK: 278,000; FRA: 300,000
The Origin of Love	Released: 17 September 2012; Label: Casablanca; Formats: CD, digital download	24	—	31	6	7	10	1	43	61	12	15	—	15	47	FRA: Platinum; ITA: Gold	FRA: 120,000; US: 33,000
No Place in Heaven	Release: 15 June 2015; Label: Casablanca, Republic; Formats: CD, digital download	19	—	74	3	9	6	2	70	84	3	20	—	4	117	UK: Silver; FRA: Platinum; ITA: Platinum	FRA: 100,000
My Name Is Michael Holbrook	Released: 4 October 2019; Label: Republic; Formats: CD, digital download	57	—	—	3	38	30	6	—	—	10	—	—	10	184		
Que ta tête fleurisse toujours	Released: 1 December 2023; Label: Island Def Jam, Universal; Formats: CD, digital download	—	—	—	3	73	—	5	—	—	—	—	—	8	—		
Hyperlove	Released: 23 January 2026; Label: Republic; Formats: CD, vinyl, digital download, streaming	14	—	—	4	21	—	10	—	—	98	—	—	15	—		FRA: 15,000 (Note: France sales figures for Hyperlove as of June 2026.)

=== Live albums ===
List of live albums, with selected chart positions
Title	Album details	Peak chart positions				
Title	Album details	BEL (FL)	BEL (WA)	CAN	ITA	SWI
Mika et l'Orchestre symphonique de Montréal (with Montreal Symphony Orchestra)	Released: 13 November 2015; Label: Republic (4762090); Formats: CD, digital download	—	—	40	—	—
Sinfonia Pop	Released: 27 May 2016; Label: Eagle Rock (EAGDV057); Formats: CD, digital download	118	23	—	46	80
Live from Brooklyn Steel	Released: 31 January 2020; Label: Republic; Formats: digital download	—	—	—	—	—
À l'Opéra Royal de Versailles	Released: 19 February 2021; Label: Republic; Formats: digital download	—	—	—	—	—

=== Compilation albums ===
Title	Album details	Peak chart positions		Certifications
Title	Album details	FRA	ITA	Certifications
2 for 1: Life in Cartoon Motion + The Boy Who Knew Too Much	Released: 31 October 2011; Label: Universal; Formats: CD	9	—	
Songbook Vol. 1	Released: 12 November 2013; Label: Universal; Formats: CD, digital download	—	3	ITA: 2× Platinum

== Extended plays ==
Title	EP details	UK
Dodgy Holiday EP	Released: 20 November 2006; Label: Casablanca; Format: Digital download	97
Napster Live Session EP	Released: 18 December 2006; Label: Casablanca; Format: Digital download	—
HMV Live	Released: 1 January 2007; Label: Casablanca; Format: Digital download	—
Live in Cartoon Motion	Released: 1 January 2007; Label: Casablanca; Format: Digital download	—
iTunes Festival: London 2007	Released: 28 August 2007; Label: Casablanca; Format: Digital download	—
Songs for Sorrow	Released: 8 June 2009; Label: Casablanca; Formats: CD, digital download	—
iTunes Live: London Festival '09	Released: 11 August 2009; Label: Casablanca; Format: Digital download	—
This Is the Sound of: Mika	Released: 1 January 2010; Label: Universal; Format: Digital download	—
Pride	Released: 5 June 2023; Label: Universal; Format: Digital download	—

== Singles ==
=== As lead artist ===
List of singles, with selected chart positions and certifications
Single	Year	Peak chart positions												Certifications	Album
Single	Year	UK	AUS	AUT	BEL (WA)	BEL (FL)	FRA	GER	IRE	ITA	NLD	SWI	US	Certifications	Album
"Relax, Take It Easy" (Note: In the United Kingdom, "Relax, Take It Easy" was first released in October 2006 and peaked at number seventy-eight, but was re-released in December 2007 as a double A-side with "Lollipop" peaking at number eighteen. "Lollipop" was released as a download only and peaked separately at number fifty-nine.)	2006	18	—	3	1	1	1	4	8	2	1	2	—	UK: Gold; GER: Platinum; ITA: Gold	Life in Cartoon Motion
"Grace Kelly"	2007	1	2	3	1	2	82	4	1	1	4	2	57	UK: 3× Platinum; AUS: Platinum; GER: Gold; ITA: Platinum; SWI: Gold; US: Gold	Life in Cartoon Motion
"Love Today"	2007	6	3	—	3	4	5	—	13	5	25	46	92	UK: Silver; AUS: Platinum	Life in Cartoon Motion
"Big Girl (You Are Beautiful)"	2007	9	23	8	10	5	—	19	9	47	4	29	—	UK: Gold; AUS: Gold	Life in Cartoon Motion
"Happy Ending"	2007	7	7	29	26	11	—	28	29	12	10	10	—	UK: Gold; AUS: Gold; ITA: Gold	Life in Cartoon Motion
"Lollipop"	2007	59	—	51	21	24	—	35	—	—	13	58	—	UK: Gold	Life in Cartoon Motion
"We Are Golden"	2009	4	10	17	7	9	19	29	14	3	20	11	— (Note: "We Are Golden" did not enter the US Billboard Hot 100, but peaked at number 5 on the US Dance Club Play Songs Chart.)	UK: Silver; ITA: Gold	The Boy Who Knew Too Much
"Rain"	2009	72	90	—	3	5	5	56	—	4	24	28	—	ITA: Platinum	The Boy Who Knew Too Much
"Blame It on the Girls"	2009	72	—	—	24	28	—	—	—	—	—	—	— (Note: "Blame It on the Girls" did not enter the US Billboard Hot 100, but peaked at number 36 on the US Heatseekers Songs Chart.)		The Boy Who Knew Too Much
"Kick Ass (We Are Young)" (Mika vs. RedOne)	2010	84	—	54	5	8	—	54	7	5	—	56	— (Note: "Kiss Ass (We Are Young)" did not enter the US Billboard Hot 100, but peakes at number 13 on the US Dance Club Songs Chart.)	ITA: Platinum	Kick-Ass
"Elle me dit"	2011	—	—	—	1	9	1	—	—	—	—	16	—		The Origin of Love
"Celebrate" (featuring Pharrell Williams)	2012	—	—	—	37	(Note: Positions pertain to the Belgian Ultratip chart.)	33	—	—	30	35	—	—	ITA: Gold	The Origin of Love
"Underwater"	2012	—	—	68	27		12	46	—	14	—	13	—	ITA: Gold	The Origin of Love
"Popular Song" (featuring Ariana Grande)	2012	183	71	—			—	—	—	—	92	—	87	UK: Silver; US: Gold	The Origin of Love
"Live Your Life"	2013	—	—	—	—	—	—	—	—	—	—	—	—		Songbook Vol. 1
"Stardust" (featuring Chiara)	2013	—	—	—	—	—	—	—	—	1	—	—	—	ITA: 4× Platinum	Songbook Vol. 1
"Boum Boum Boum"	2014	—	—	—	10		10	—	—	43	—	62	—		No Place in Heaven
"Talk About You"	2015	—	—	—	39		35	—	—	—	—	—	—		No Place in Heaven
"Staring at the Sun"	2015	—	—	—	39	—	154	—	—	42	—	—	—	ITA: Gold	No Place in Heaven
"Beautiful Disaster" (with Fedez)	2015	—	—	—	—	—	—	—	—	5	—	—	—	ITA: 2× Platinum	Pop-Hoolista
"Hurts" (Remix)	2016	—	—	—	—	—	—	—	—	—	—	—	—		No Place in Heaven
"Wonderful Christmastime" (with Kylie Minogue)	2016	—	—	—	—	23	—	—	—	—	—	—	—		Kylie Christmas: Snow Queen Edition
"It's My House"	2017	—	—	—	74	—	—	—	—	—	—	—	—		My Name Is Michael Holbrook
"Sound of an Orchestra"	2019	—	—	—	—	—	—	—	—	—	—	—	—		My Name Is Michael Holbrook
"Ice Cream"	2019	—	—	—	21	—	—	—	—	—	—	—	—		My Name Is Michael Holbrook
"Tiny Love"	2019	—	—	—	—	—	—	—	—	—	—	—	—		My Name Is Michael Holbrook
"Sanremo"	2019	— (Note: "Sanremo" did not enter the UK Singles Chart Top 100, but peaked at number 72 on the UK Singles Downloads Chart.)	—	—	—	—	—	—	—	—	—	—	—		My Name Is Michael Holbrook
"Tomorrow"	2019	—	—	—	—	—	—	—	—	—	—	—	—		My Name Is Michael Holbrook
"Dear Jealousy"	2020	—	—	—	—	—	—	—	—	—	—	—	—		My Name Is Michael Holbrook
"Le cœur Holiday" (featuring Soprano)	2020	—	—	—	26	—	—	—	—	—	—	—	—		Non-album single
"Bella d'estate" (featuring Michele Bravi)	2020	—	—	—	—	—	—	—	—	—	—	—	—		Non-album single
"Me, Myself" (with Danna Paola)	2020	—	—	—	—	—	—	—	—	—	—	—	—		K.O.
"Six heures d'avion nous séparent" (with Pierre Lapointe)	2020	—	—	—	—	—	—	—	—	—	—	—	—		Chansons hivernales
"It Must Have Been Love" (with Danna Paola)	2021	—	—	—	—	—	—	—	—	—	—	—	—		Non-album singles
"Yo Yo"	2022	— (Note: "Yo Yo" did not chart on the UK Singles Chart, but peaked at number 21 on the UK Singles Downloads Chart.)	—	—	—	—	—	—	—	—	—	—	—		Non-album singles
"C'est La Vie"	2023	—	—	—	13	—	—	—	—	—	—	—	—		Que ta tête fleurisse toujours
"Apocalypse Calypso"	2023	—	—	—	—	—	—	—	—	—	—	—	—		Que ta tête fleurisse toujours
"Jane Birkin"	2024	—	—	—	—	—	—	—	—	—	—	—	—		Que ta tête fleurisse toujours
"Modern Times"	2025	—	—	—	—	—	—	—	—	—	—	—	—		Hyperlove
"Immortal Love"	2025	—	—	—	—	—	—	—	—	—	—	—	—		Hyperlove
"Excuses for Love"	2026	—	—	—	—	—	—	—	—	—	—	—	—		Hyperlove
"Spinning Out"	2026	—	—	—	—	—	—	—	—	—	—	—	—		Hyperlove
"Cœur Stone" (featuring Styleto)	2026	—	—	—	—	—	—	—	—	—	—	—	—		Non-album single
"—" denotes single that did not chart or was not released

=== Promotional singles ===
List of singles, with selected chart positions and certifications
Single	Year	Peak chart positions					Certifications	Album
Single	Year	BEL (WA)	BEL (FL)	FRA	ITA	SK int.	Certifications	Album
"Origin of Love"	2012			136	—	20		The Origin of Love
"Good Guys" / "Happy Ending" (X Factor Finale Medley)	2014	—	—	—	8	—		Non-album single
"Last Party"	2015	—	—	126	—	—		No Place in Heaven
"Good Guys"	2015	—	—	101	42	—	ITA: Gold	No Place in Heaven
"—" denotes single that did not chart or was not released

=== As featured artist ===
Single	Year	Peak chart positions								Certifications	Album
Single	Year	UK	AUS	AUT	BEL (WA)	GER	IRE	ITA	SWI	Certifications	Album
"Everybody Hurts" (as part of Helping Haiti)	2010	1	28	23	41	16	1	14	16	UK: Platinum	Charity release
"Youth and Love" (Jack Savoretti featuring Mika)	2019	—	—	—	—	—	—	—	—		Singing to Strangers: Special Edition
"Danser entre hommes" (Doriand featuring Philippe Katerine and Mika)	2019	—	—	—	—	—	—	—	—		Portraits
"Bolero" (Baby K featuring Mika)	2022	—	—	—	—	—	—	47	—	ITA: Platinum	Donna sulla luna
"Keep It Simple" (Vianney featuring Mika)	2023	—	—	—	19	—	—	—	—		Non-album single

=== Other charted songs ===
Song	Year	Peak chart positions				Album
Song	Year	UK	CAN AC	FRA	US	Album
"Stuck in the Middle"	2007	174	—	—	—	Life in Cartoon Motion
"J'ai pas envie"	2015	—	36	—	—	No Place in Heaven
"Over My Shoulder"	2017	—	—	22	—	Life in Cartoon Motion
"Love You When I'm Drunk"	2018	—	—	—	— (Note: "Love You When I'm Drunk" did not chart on the Billboard Hot 100, but peaked at number two on the Hot 100 Singles Recurrents chart.)	The Origin of Love

== Video albums ==
Title	Album details	Certifications
Live in Cartoon Motion	Released: 12 November 2007; Label: Island (#1751268); Formats: DVD	UK: Gold
Live Parc des Princes Paris	Released: 10 November 2008; Label: Island (#1751268); Formats: DVD, BD	
Sinfonia Pop	Released: 27 May 2016; Label: Eagle Rock (EAGDV061); Formats: CD+DVD, BD, digital download	
Mika Love Paris	Released: 9 December 2016; Label: Casablanca (00602557229394); Formats: DVD, BD, digital download	

== Music videos ==
Year	Title	Other performer(s) credited	Director
2006	"Relax, Take It Easy" (version one)		Airside
2007	"Grace Kelly"		Sophie Muller
2007	"Love Today"		Sophie Muller
2007	"Big Girl (You Are Beautiful)"		Patrick Daughters
2007	"Happy Ending"		AlexandLiane
2007	"Relax, Take It Easy" (version two)		Matt Askem
2007	"Lollipop"		Bonzom
2009	"We Are Golden"		Jonas Åkerlund
2009	"Blame It on the Girls"		Nez Khammal
2009	"Rain"		Nez Khammal
2010	"Everybody Hurts" (as part of Helping Haiti)		Joseph Kahn
2010	"Kick Ass (We Are Young)" (with RedOne)		Jim Canty
2011	"Elle me dit"		Kinga Burza
2012	"Make You Happy"		Iouri Philippe Paillé
2012	"Celebrate" (featuring Pharrell Williams)		BBGun
2012	"Origin of Love"		Cristián Jiménez
2012	"Underwater"		Alex Southam
2013	"Popular Song" (featuring Ariana Grande)		Chris Marrs Piliero
2013	"Live Your Life"		
2014	"Boum Boum Boum"		Jonathan Lia
2015	"Last Party"		Peter Lindbergh
2015	"Talk About You"		KT Auleta
2015	"Good Guys"		KT Auleta
2015	"Staring at the Sun"		Andreas Dermanis and MIKA
2015	"Tant que j’ai le soleil"		Andreas Dermanis and MIKA
2015	"Beautiful Disaster"	Fedez	
2015	"Je chante"		
2016	"Hurts" (Remix)		Ivan Cotroneo
2019	"Ice Cream"		Francesco Calabrese
2019	"Tiny Love"		W.I.Z.
2019	"Danser entre hommes"	Doriand & Katerine	W.I.Z.
2019	"Sanremo"		W.I.Z.
2019	"Tomorrow"		Charles Todd
2019	"Dear Jealousy"		Charles Todd
2020	"Le cœur Holiday" (featuring Soprano)		Giorgio Scorza and Erika De Nicola
2022	"Yo-Yo"		MIKA
2022	"Bolero" (with Baby K)		Marc Lucas
2023	"C'est La Vie"		The Key Designer
2025	"Modern Times"		Rupert Höller
2025	"Immortal Love"		Nick Barfleet
