= La Voz (Spanish TV series) season 12 =

La Voz
- Season 12
- Promotional poster featuring coaches López, Mika, Malú, and Yatra
- Hosted by: Eva González
- Coaches: Mika; Pablo López; Malú; Sebastián Yatra
- Winner: Antía Pinal
- Winning coach: Pablo López
- Runner-up: Oihan Aristizabal

Release
- Original network: Antena 3
- Original release: 19 September – 19 December 2025

Season chronology
- ← Previous; Season 11 Next → Season 13

The twelfth season of La Voz started airing on 19 September 2025 on Antena 3. Pablo López and Malú both returned as coaches for their seventh and ninth season, respectively. Two new coaches, Sebastián Yatra and Mika, joined the panel this season, replacing Luis Fonsi and Antonio Orozco. Eva González returned as host for her seventh consecutive season.

Antía Pinal was announced the winner of the twelfth season, marking Pablo López's second (and fourth overall on all versions of the show) win as a coach. Pinal's win marks the first time an artist won on a different team than his/her original team since Isaiah Kelly in the seventh season (Pinal previously was on Team Yatra before López stole her in the knockouts).

== Panelists ==
=== Coaches & Host ===
La Voz Season 12 Coaches

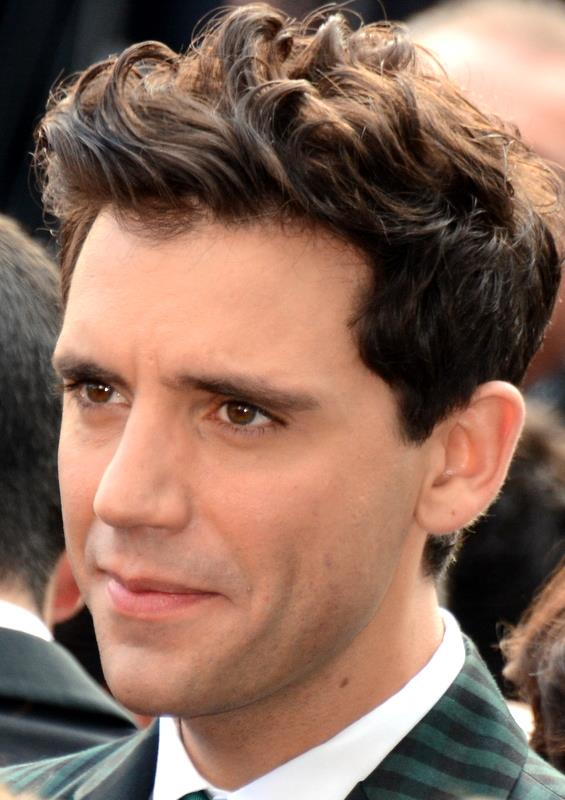
Mika

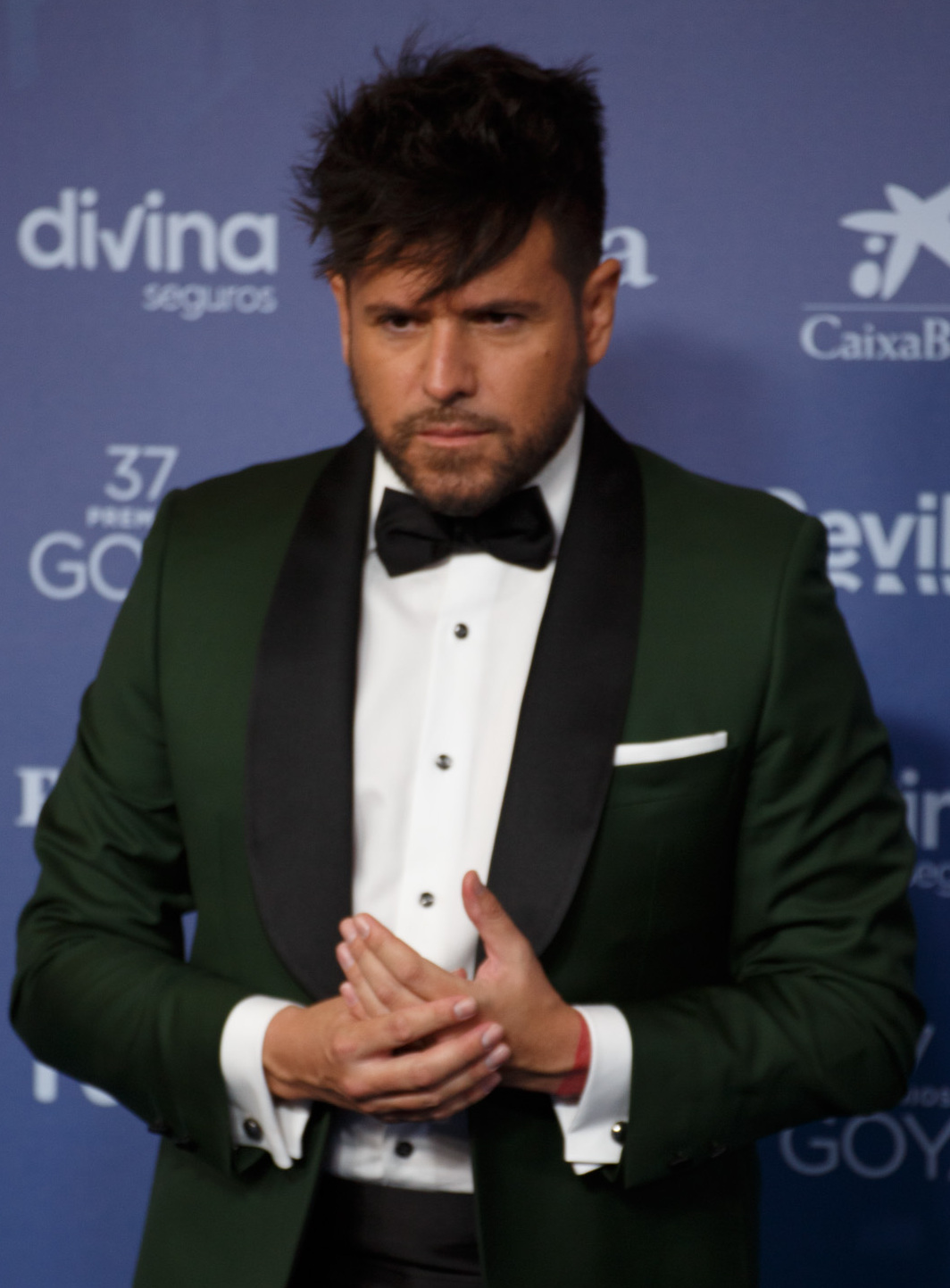
Pablo López

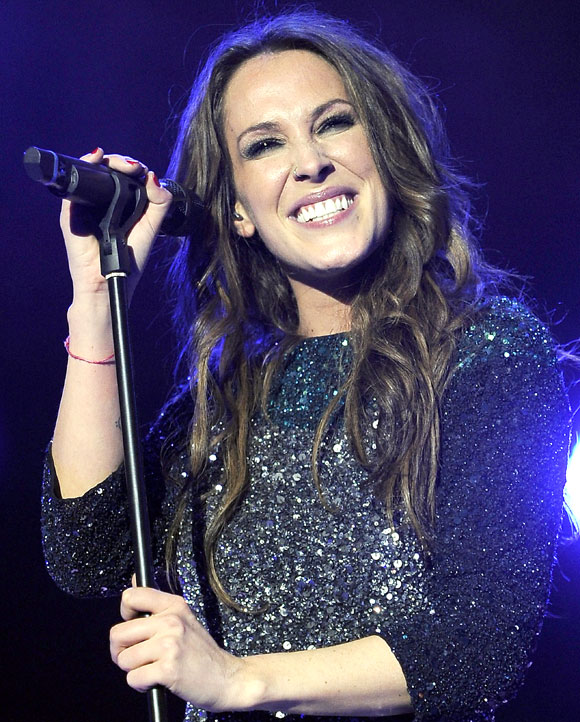
Malú

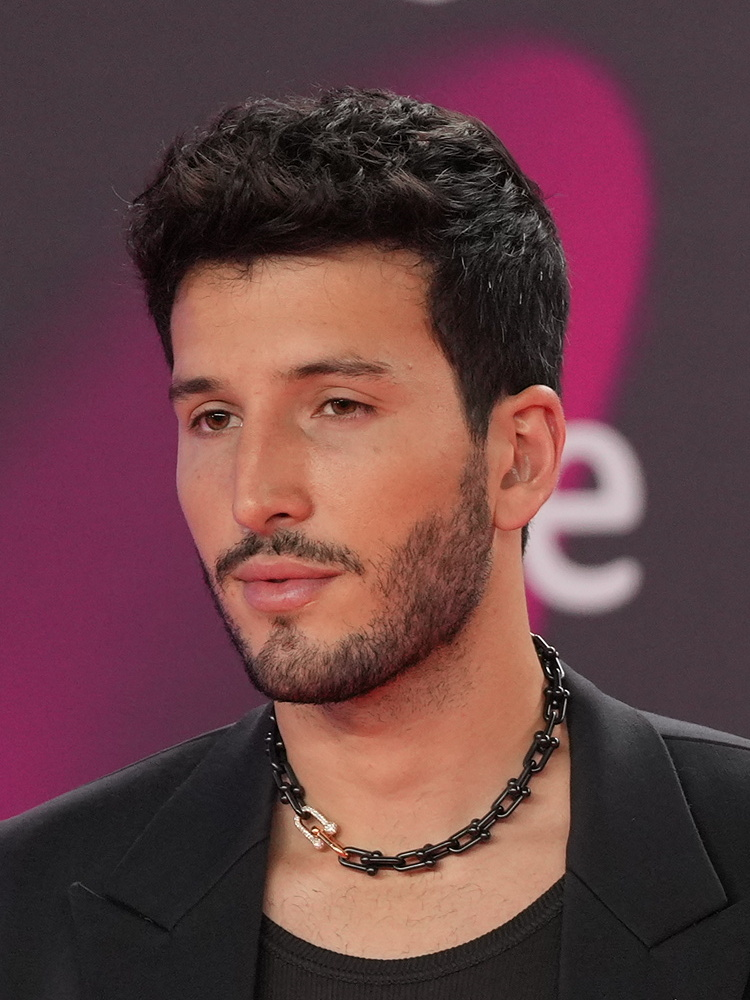
Sebastián Yatra

On 22 May 2025, the coaching panel was announced to consist of returning coaches Malú and Pablo López, who both return for their ninth and seventh seasons, respectively. Mika, who previously served as a coach on The Voice France and The Voice France All-Stars, and Sebastián Yatra, who previously served as a coach on La Voz Kids, both debuted as coaches, replacing Antonio Orozco and Luis Fonsi, respectively. This marked the first time since the sixth season that two new coaches were introduced to the panel. Eva González returned as host for her seventh consecutive season.

=== Advisors ===
In the battles, each coach brought in an advisor for their team: Carla Morrison for Team Mika, Chiara Oliver for Team Pablo, Joaquina for Team Malú, and María Becerra for Team Yatra.

== Teams ==
- Winner
- Runner-up
- Third Place
- Fourth Place
- Artist was Eliminated in Semifinal
- Artist was Eliminated in Quarter-Final
- Artist was Eliminated in the Phase 2 of Knockouts
- Artist was Stolen in the Phase 1 of Knockouts
- Artist was Eliminated in the Phase 1 of Knockouts
- Artist was Eliminated in The Great Battles

Coach	Top 56 Artists				
Mika	Javier Barrera	Pedro Henrique	Diva Barbosa	Jake Miagra	Nela García
Mika	Sheila Paz	~~Cayetano Fernández~~	Mateo Latorre	Antony Vallejo	Blanca Enamorado
Mika	Catalina Rodríguez	Marta Fornali	Miguel Ángel Prieto	Mirko Nisenson	Sophia McDougall
Pablo López	Antía Pinal	Aroa Salaño	Estefanía Gaitan	Ferran Amador	Cristina Zuloaga
Pablo López	María Conesa	~~Elena Santana~~	Kirsti Anne Blow	Evelyn Cabrera	Inés Álvarez
Pablo López	Mar Hernández	Maya Alexander	Sara Aparisi	Sofia Nikabadze	Sofía Cortés "Sissi"
Malú	Audrey	Victoria Rosales	Elena Santana	Nayo	Luis Fernández
Malú	Moisés Salazar	~~Diva Barbosa~~	Dani Hernán	Carolina Andrada	Libertad Román
Malú	Linabel	Mayte Adrián	Perla Yaquira	Sisi Bon	Shia
Sebastián Yatra	Oihan Aristizabal	Kimy Touw	Cayetano Fernández	El Gato CHP	Andrés James
Sebastián Yatra	Jonny Vandell	~~Antía Pinal~~	Noa Marcos Díez	Al Liquindoi	Ángel González
Sebastián Yatra	Fernando Muñoz	Juampi	Julio Gómez	Nando Mesas	Zaira Lizarazu
Note: Italicized names are stolen artists (names struck through within former teams). Bold names are recipients of the "repentance button."

== Blind Auditions ==
The first stage of the show, the blind auditions, premiered 19 September 2025. In this stage, artists perform on stage with coaches turned away from them in rotating chairs. If a coach is interested in working with the artist, he/she will press the main button on his/her chair to spin the chair towards the artist. If more than one coach turns, the artist gets to select his/her team. Like last season, the "block" feature returned, which allows a coach to effectively block another coach from getting an artist. This feature can be used twice per coach, however Mika and Yatra did not use their second "block". The "superblock" also returned, which allows a coach to block another coach after the performance has ended. This feature can be used thrice per coach.

This season, two new features were introduced. Firstly, the "megablock" feature was added. First introduced on The Voice Kids Italy, this feature, given once to each coach, allows a coach to block every other coach, automatically defaulting the artist to his/her team. At the end of the blind auditions, Yatra and Mika did not use their "megablock". Additionally, each coach receives one "botón del arrepentimiento" (repentance button) to use. The concept, introduced on the 26th season of The Voice USA, allows a coach to acquire an originally eliminated artist (the artist did not receive a turn in the duration of his/her performance) and save that artist once all the chairs have spun around.

Blind auditions color key
✔	Coach pressed "I WANT YOU" button
	Artist selected a coach's team
	Artist defaulted to a coach's team
	Artist was eliminated
	Artist was originally eliminated, but a coach pressed the "repentance button"
✘	Coach pressed "I WANT YOU" button, but was blocked by another coach from getting the artist
✘	Coach pressed "I WANT YOU" button, but was superblocked by another coach from getting the artist
✘	Coach pressed "I WANT YOU" button, but was megablocked by another coach from getting the artist
	Blocked by Mika; Blocked by Pablo; Blocked by Malú; Blocked by Yatra

=== Blind Auditions Results ===
Episode	Order	Artist	Age	Song	Coach's and artist's choices			
Episode	Order	Artist	Age	Song	Mika	Pablo	Malú	Yatra
Episode 1 (19 September)	1	Nela García	28	"Mañana"	✔	✔	✘	✘
Episode 1 (19 September)	2	Oihan Aristizabal	19	"Skyfall"	✔	—	—	✔
Episode 1 (19 September)	3	Jonny Vandell	21	"Yellow"	✔	✔	✘	✔
Episode 1 (19 September)	4	María Conesa	21	"Somewhere Over the Rainbow"	✔	✔	—	—
Episode 1 (19 September)	5	Elena Santana "La Cangreja"	27	"Hit the Road Jack" / "Feeling Good"	—	✔	—	—
Episode 1 (19 September)	6	Sheila Paz	29	"La vida loca"	✔	✘	✘	✘
Episode 1 (19 September)	7	Linabel	26	"Romance del amargo"	✔	—	✔	—
Episode 1 (19 September)	8	Gisela Villamayor	32	"I Dreamed a Dream"	—	—	—	—
Episode 1 (19 September)	9	Dani Hernán	24	"Ángel caído"	✔	✘	✔	✔
Episode 1 (19 September)	10	Mirko Nisenson	23	"Blackbird"	✔	✔	—	—
Episode 1 (19 September)	11	Luis Belda Cerdá	32	"Voi che sapete"	—	—	—	—
Episode 1 (19 September)	12	Perla Yaquira	30	"Si antes te hubiera conocido"	—	—	✔	—
Episode 2 (26 September)	1	Sisi Bon	27	"(You Make Me Feel Like) A Natural Woman"	✘	✘	✔	✘
Episode 2 (26 September)	2	Sara Aparisi	19	"Lucha de gigantes"	✔	✔	✔	—
Episode 2 (26 September)	3	Jake Miagra	28	"Never Tear Us Apart"	✔	—	—	✔
Episode 2 (26 September)	4	Javier Barrera	21	"Te espero aquí"	✔	✘	—	✘
Episode 2 (26 September)	5	Xexu García	31	"Pinceles"	—	—	—	—
Episode 2 (26 September)	6	Juampi	30	"Solamente Tú"	✔	✘^{1}	—	✔
Episode 2 (26 September)	7	Audrey	25	"Never Enough"	—	—	✔	—
Episode 2 (26 September)	8	Evelyn Cabrera	22	"Creep"	—	✔	—	✔
Episode 2 (26 September)	9	Nayo	30	"Clown"	—	—	✔	✘
Episode 2 (26 September)	10	Nando Mesas	30	"Watermelon Sugar"	✘	—	—	✔
Episode 2 (26 September)	11	Judit Uris	27	"Holding Out for a Hero"	—	—	—	—
Episode 2 (26 September)	12	Libertad Román	37	"Roxanne"	✘	—	✔	—
Episode 3 (3 October)	1	Catalina Rodríguez	26	"Beautiful Things"	✔	—	—	—
Episode 3 (3 October)	2	Luis Fernández (El Granaíno)	36	"No me conviene"	✔	✔	✔	✔
Episode 3 (3 October)	3	Antony Vallejo	32	"Heaven"	✔	—	—	—
Episode 3 (3 October)	4	Ferran Amador	18	"Vampire"	✔	✔	—	—
Episode 3 (3 October)	5	Mar Hernández	21	"Me hubiese gutado"	✘	✔	✘	✘
Episode 3 (3 October)	6	Pere Portero	28	"Arcade"	—	—	—	—
Episode 3 (3 October)	7	Andrés James	30	"Chan Chan"	—	—	—	✔
Episode 3 (3 October)	8	Cristina Zuloaga	22	"Wildflower"	—	✔	—	—
Episode 3 (3 October)	9	Noa Marcos Díez	19	"The Voice Within"	—	—	—	✔
Episode 3 (3 October)	10	Eva Martín	28	"Dragón rojo"	—	—	—	—
Episode 3 (3 October)	11	Marta Fornali	19	"Je veux"	✔	✔	—	—
Episode 3 (3 October)	12	Adrián Darrel	38	"Crazy"	—	—	—	—
Episode 3 (3 October)	13	Carolina Andrada	42	"Mononoke hime"	—	—	✔	—
Episode 4 (10 October)	1	Victoria Rosales	20	"Deshazte de mí"	✔	✔	✔	✘^{2}
Episode 4 (10 October)	2	Kimy Touw	28	"Human"	—	—	—	✔
Episode 4 (10 October)	3	Aroa Salaño	18	"In the Stars"	—	✔	—	—
Episode 4 (10 October)	4	Estefanía Gaitan	22	"Antes de ti"	✔	✔	✔	✘
Episode 4 (10 October)	5	Al Liquindoi	30	"Pájaros de barro"	—	—	—	✔
Episode 4 (10 October)	6	Sophia McDougall	22	"Waiting Room"	✔	—	—	—
Episode 4 (10 October)	7	Shia	30	"Dos gardenias"	—	—	✔	—
Episode 4 (10 October)	8	Fran Valero	30	"A que no me dejas"	—	—	—	—
Episode 4 (10 October)	9	Pedro Henrique	28	"Falling"	✔	✔	—	✔
Episode 4 (10 October)	10	Fernando Muñoz	28	"Honky Tonk Blues"	—	—	—	✔
Episode 4 (10 October)	11	Jota Cuenca	41	"Maybe I Maybe You"	—	—	—	—
Episode 4 (10 October)	12	Blanca Enamorado	28	"Cuando nadie me ve"	✔	—	—	—
Episode 5 (17 October)	1	Idris "Elguiriandalu"	24	"Redemption Song"	—	—	—	—
Episode 5 (17 October)	2	Moisés Salazar	37	"Ya no quiero ser"	✔	—	✔	—
Episode 5 (17 October)	3	Maya Alexander	31	"Die with a Smile"	—	✔	—	—
Episode 5 (17 October)	4	Diva Barbosa	23	"Chuva"	✘	—	✔	—
Episode 5 (17 October)	5	Sofía Cortés "Sissi"	25	"Contigo"	—	✔	—	—
Episode 5 (17 October)	6	Julio Gómez	21	"Desencuentro"	✔	✘	✔	✔
Episode 5 (17 October)	7	Wilma Ann Anderson	54	"The Way We Were"	—	—	—	—
Episode 5 (17 October)	8	Miguel Ángel Prieto	24	"Say Something"	✔	—	—	—
Episode 5 (17 October)	9	Nazaret Pérez	18	"No me lo creo"	—	—	—	—
Episode 5 (17 October)	10	Ángel González	28	"Peter Pan"	—	✔	—	✔
Episode 5 (17 October)	11	Alejandra Burgos	42	"Bette Davis Eyes"	—	—	—	—
Episode 5 (17 October)	12	Sofia Nikabadze	21	"When We Were Young"	—	✔	—	—
Episode 6 (24 October)	1	Mayte Adrián	43	"Arráncame"	—	—	✔	—
Episode 6 (24 October)	2	Caleb Poll	28	"All of Me"	—	—	Team full	—
Episode 6 (24 October)	3	El Gato CHP	38	"Acaríciame la cara"	—	✘	Team full	✔
Episode 6 (24 October)	4	Inés Álvarez	21	"You Say"	—	✔	Team full	—
Episode 6 (24 October)	5	María Grant Washington	19	"Back to Black"	—	—	Team full	—
Episode 6 (24 October)	6	Cayetano Fernández	25	"Viviendo deprisa"	✔	—	Team full	✔
Episode 6 (24 October)	7	Mateo Latorre	29	"Way Down We Go"	✔	✘	Team full	✔
Episode 6 (24 October)	8	Wilma Ann Anderson	54	"At Last"	Team full	—	Team full	—
Episode 6 (24 October)	9	Ana Ascanio	54	"For Better or Worse"	Team full	—	Team full	—
Episode 6 (24 October)	10	Kirsti Anne Blow	27	"Fast Car"	Team full	✔	Team full	✔
Episode 6 (24 October)	11	Antía Pinal	20	"Confieso"	Team full	Team full	Team full	✔
Episode 6 (24 October)	12	Zaira Lizarazu	22	"I Knew It, I Know You"	Team full	Team full	Team full	✔

- ^1 Mika attempted to block Pablo but was not successful because Yatra already had blocked him.
- ^2 Mika unintentionally blocked Yatra by pressing the block button with his elbow. Nonetheless, the block remained.

== Great Battles ==
The great battles aired on 31 October 2025. This season, the artists are placed in groups of either three, four, five, or six and their coach elects multiple, one, or no winner(s) to the Knockouts. In total, each coach selects seven artists to advance to the Knockouts from his/her team. In addition, coaches' advisors help them on deciding who will be advancing to the next round; Carla Morrison for Team Mika, Chiara Oliver for Team Pablo, Joaquina for Team Malú, and María Becerra for Team Yatra.

Battles color key
Artist was chosen by his/her coach to advance to the Knockouts
Artist was eliminated

=== Episode 7 (31 October) ===
Seventh episode's results
Order	Coach	Winner	Songs	Losers
1	Sebastián Yatra	Oihan Aristizabal	"Wish You the Best"	Nando Mesas
1	Sebastián Yatra	Noa Marcos Díez	"Wish You the Best"	Nando Mesas
1	Sebastián Yatra	Kimy Touw	"Wish You the Best"	Nando Mesas
2	Sebastián Yatra	Antía Pinal	"Say You Won't Let Go"	Juampi
2	Sebastián Yatra	Jonny Vandell	"Say You Won't Let Go"	Zaira Lizarazu
2	Sebastián Yatra	Jonny Vandell	"Say You Won't Let Go"	Fernando Muñoz
3	Sebastián Yatra	Andrés James	"La reina"	Al Liquindoi
3	Sebastián Yatra	El Gato CHP	"La reina"	Ángel González
3	Sebastián Yatra	El Gato CHP	"La reina"	Julio Gómez
4	Pablo López	Aroa Salaño	"Young and Beautiful"	N/A
4	Pablo López	Cristina Zuloaga	"Young and Beautiful"	N/A
4	Pablo López	Ferran Amador	"Young and Beautiful"	N/A
4	Pablo López	Kirsti Anne Blow	"Young and Beautiful"	N/A
5	Pablo López	María Conesa	"It's All Coming Back to Me Now"	Evelyn Cabrera
5	Pablo López	María Conesa	"It's All Coming Back to Me Now"	Inés Álvarez
5	Pablo López	María Conesa	"It's All Coming Back to Me Now"	Maya Alexander
5	Pablo López	María Conesa	"It's All Coming Back to Me Now"	Sofia Nikabadze
6	Pablo López	Elena Santana	"Tulipanes"	Mar Hernández
6	Pablo López	Estefanía Gaitan	"Tulipanes"	Sara Aparisi
6	Pablo López	Estefanía Gaitan	"Tulipanes"	Sofía "Sissi"
7	Mika	Cayetano Fernández	"Vete de mí"	Blanca Enamorado
7	Mika	Javier Barrera	"Vete de mí"	Blanca Enamorado
7	Mika	Nela García	"Vete de mí"	Blanca Enamorado
7	Mika	Sheila Paz	"Vete de mí"	Blanca Enamorado
8	Mika	Jake Miagra	"You're Still the One"	Antony Vallejo
8	Mika	Mateo Latorre	"You're Still the One"	Miguel Ángel Prieto
8	Mika	Mateo Latorre	"You're Still the One"	Mirko Nisenson
9	Mika	Pedro Henrique	"Pure Imagination"	Catalina Rodríguez
9	Mika	Pedro Henrique	"Pure Imagination"	Marta Fornali
9	Mika	Pedro Henrique	"Pure Imagination"	Sophia McDougall
10	Malú	Audrey	"Lose Control"	Libertad Román
10	Malú	Nayo	"Lose Control"	Sisi Bon
11	Malú	Dani Hernán	"Toda una vida"	Carolina Andrada
11	Malú	Diva Barbosa	"Toda una vida"	Perla Yaquira
11	Malú	Victoria Rosales	"Toda una vida"	Shia
12	Malú	Luis Fernández	"Al Alba"	Linabel
12	Malú	Moisés Salazar	"Al Alba"	Mayte Adrián

== Knockouts ==
In this round the remaining 28 artists, 7 per team, will compete for their spots in the Lives. Just like last season, this season the Knockouts consist of two phases. The advisors for each team from the "Great Battles" reprised their role in this round.

=== Phase 1 ===
In the first phase, the seven artists on each team will perform one by one. Only one artist will receive the 'Fast-Pass (Pase Directo)' and directly advance to the Lives. Four artists will be put in the 'Danger Zone' where they will compete for two remaining spots in the second phase. In addition, each coach was given a 'Steal' to get an artist from another team to advance to the Lives. Once an artist is announced to be put into the 'Danger Zone', the coach whose 'Steal' is still available will have the chance to steal the artist. Artists who were stolen will automatically advance to the Lives. After an artist was stolen, the coach of the team then chooses another artist for the 'Danger Zone'. This procedure comes to an end once there are three artists officially in the 'Danger Zone'. The remaining artists will be eliminated in this round and will not have the chance to compete in the second phase.

The first episode of the Knockouts features Team Malú and Team Yatra. Both coaches performed a song together with their advisor before their artists began to perform. Malú and Joaquina performed "Diles" and Sebastián Yatra and María Becerra performed "Si tú no estás".

The second episode of the Knockouts features Team Mika and Team Pablo. Both coaches performed a song together with their advisor before their artists began to perform. Mika and Carla Morrison performed "Diamantes" and Pablo López and Chiara Oliver performed "Tulipanes".

Knockouts (Phase 1) color key
Artist got a 'Fast-Pass' and advanced to the Lives
Artist initially put into the 'Danger Zone' but was stolen by another coach and advanced to the Lives
Artist put in the 'Danger Zone' and entered Phase 2
Artist was eliminated in Phase 1

Knockouts (Phase 1) Results
Episode	Coach	Order	Artist	Song	Results
Episode 8 (7 November)	Malú	1	Audrey	"Hero"	Danger Zone
Episode 8 (7 November)	Malú	2	Luis Fernández	"Bulerías"	Danger Zone
Episode 8 (7 November)	Malú	3	Diva Barbosa	"Meu fado meu"	Stolen by Mika
Episode 8 (7 November)	Malú	4	Nayo	"As Long as You Love Me"	Danger Zone
Episode 8 (7 November)	Malú	5	Dani Hernán	"Miedo"	Eliminated
Episode 8 (7 November)	Malú	6	Moisés Salazar	"Km0"	Danger Zone
Episode 8 (7 November)	Malú	7	Victoria Rosales	"Así era ella"	Fast-Pass
Episode 8 (7 November)	Sebastián Yatra	8	Oihan Aristizabal	"Ordinary"	Fast-Pass
Episode 8 (7 November)	Sebastián Yatra	9	Kimy Touw	"Million Reasons"	Danger Zone
Episode 8 (7 November)	Sebastián Yatra	10	El Gato CHP	"Amigos"	Danger Zone
Episode 8 (7 November)	Sebastián Yatra	11	Antía Pinal	"En otra vida"	Stolen by Pablo
Episode 8 (7 November)	Sebastián Yatra	12	Jonny Vandell	"Those Eyes"	Danger Zone
Episode 8 (7 November)	Sebastián Yatra	13	Noa Marcos Díez	"Almost Lover"	Eliminated
Episode 8 (7 November)	Sebastián Yatra	14	Andrés James	"Comerte entera"	Danger Zone
Episode 9 (14 November)	Mika	1	Pedro Henrique	"Sign of the Times"	Fast-Pass
Episode 9 (14 November)	Mika	2	Sheila Paz	"Soy lo prohibido"	Danger Zone
Episode 9 (14 November)	Mika	3	Mateo Latorre	"i love you"	Eliminated
Episode 9 (14 November)	Mika	4	Jake Miagra	"Heroes"	Danger Zone
Episode 9 (14 November)	Mika	5	Cayetano Fernández	"Amiga mía"	Stolen by Yatra
Episode 9 (14 November)	Mika	6	Nela García	"Sakura"	Danger Zone
Episode 9 (14 November)	Mika	7	Javier Barrera	"Que siempre sea verano"	Danger Zone
Episode 9 (14 November)	Pablo López	8	Ferran Amador	"What Was I Made For?"	Danger Zone
Episode 9 (14 November)	Pablo López	9	Elena Santana	"Killing Me Softly with His Song"	Stolen by Malú
Episode 9 (14 November)	Pablo López	10	Estefanía Gaitan	"Soledad y mar"	Danger Zone
Episode 9 (14 November)	Pablo López	11	María Conesa	"Defying Gravity"	Danger Zone
Episode 9 (14 November)	Pablo López	12	Kirsti Anne Blow	"Hentai"	Eliminated
Episode 9 (14 November)	Pablo López	13	Cristina Zuloaga	"Read All About It"	Danger Zone
Episode 9 (14 November)	Pablo López	14	Aroa Salaño	"El dragón"	Fast-Pass

=== Phase 2 ===
In the second phase, the remaining four artists on each team perform with an artist from a different team, for a total of eight more spots in the live shows. The two artists perform their respective blind audition songs and the winner of the public vote moves on. Due to the results being solely on the public's vote, all of a coach's 'Danger Zone' artists could move on to the live shows, or none. At the end of the round, each coach brought two additional artists to the live shows.

Knockouts (Phase 2) color key
Artist was saved by public's vote and advanced to the live shows
Artist was eliminated

Knockouts (Phase 2) results
Episode	Order	Challenger			Challenged		
Episode	Order	Coach	Song	Artist	Artist	Song	Coach
Episode 10 (21 November)	1	Malú	"No me conviene"	Luis Fernández	El Gato CHP	"Acaríciame la cara"	Sebastián Yatra
Episode 10 (21 November)	2	Mika	"Mañana"	Nela García	Nayo	"Clown"	Malú
Episode 10 (21 November)	3	Pablo López	"Somewhere Over the Rainbow"	María Conesa	Jake Miagra	"Never Tear Us Apart"	Mika
Episode 10 (21 November)	4	Sebastián Yatra	"Chan Chan"	Andrés James	Audrey	"Never Enough"	Malú
Episode 10 (21 November)	5	Malú	"Ya no quiero ser"	Moisés Salazar	Estefanía Gaitan	"Antes de ti"	Pablo López
Episode 10 (21 November)	6	Mika	"La vida loca"	Sheila Paz	Kimy Touw	"Human"	Sebastián Yatra
Episode 10 (21 November)	7	Pablo López	"Wildflower"	Cristina Zuloaga	Javier Barrera	"Te espero aquí"	Mika
Episode 10 (21 November)	8	Sebastián Yatra	"Yellow"	Jonny Vandell	Ferran Amador	"Vampire"	Pablo López

== Live shows ==
=== Week 1: Quarter-Final ===
The Lives aired on 28 November 2025. The Top 16 artists performed individually for a spot in the Semi-Final. Due to each team having four artists in this stage, unlike the previous season, results are even among teams. One artist per team is voted through by the public vote, while one artist per team is saved by his/her coach. The other two artists are eliminated.

Week 1: Quarter-Final color key
Artist was saved by public's vote and advanced to the Semi-Final
Artist was saved by his/her coach and advanced to the Semi-Final
Artist was eliminated

Week 1: Quarter-Final Performances & Results
Episode	Coach	Order	Artist	Song	Results
Episode 11 (28 November)	Sebastián Yatra	1	Oihan Aristizabal	"You Raise Me Up"	Yatra's Choice
Episode 11 (28 November)	Sebastián Yatra	2	Cayetano Fernández	"Por amarte así"	Eliminated
Episode 11 (28 November)	Sebastián Yatra	3	Kimy Touw	"Always Remember Us This Way"	Public's Vote
Episode 11 (28 November)	Sebastián Yatra	4	El Gato CHP	"Como el agua"	Eliminated
Episode 11 (28 November)	Malú	5	Audrey	"A Moment Like This"	Public's Vote
Episode 11 (28 November)	Malú	6	Elena Santana	"Huir"	Eliminated
Episode 11 (28 November)	Malú	7	Nayo	"Is That Alright?"	Eliminated
Episode 11 (28 November)	Malú	8	Victoria Rosales	"Por si volvieras"	Malú's Choice
Episode 11 (28 November)	Pablo López	9	Estefanía Gaitan	"Algo contigo"	Eliminated
Episode 11 (28 November)	Pablo López	10	Aroa Salaño	"Akureyri"	Pablo's Choice
Episode 11 (28 November)	Pablo López	11	Ferran Amador	"Listen"	Eliminated
Episode 11 (28 November)	Pablo López	12	Antía Pinal	"Muero"	Public's Vote
Episode 11 (28 November)	Mika	13	Javier Barrera	"Tanto"	Public's Vote
Episode 11 (28 November)	Mika	14	Jake Miagra	"Daughters"	Eliminated
Episode 11 (28 November)	Mika	15	Diva Barbosa	"Canção do Mar"	Eliminated
Episode 11 (28 November)	Mika	16	Pedro Henrique	"Biblical"	Mika's Choice

=== Week 2: Semi-Final ===
The Semi-Final aired on 12 December 2025. At the beginning of the episode, Antonio Orozco performed "Despierta" with the eight semifinalists. For each team, the remaining artist(s) first perform with their coach and then the guest invited by their coach. Mika and his team performed "Origin of Love", Pablo and his team performed "El patio", Malú and her team performed "Ni un segundo", and Yatra and his team performed "Pareja del Año".

All advisors except María Becerra returned to perform with their respective team. Carla Morrison and Pablo Alborán performed "Si te quedes" with Team Mika, Chiara Oliver performed "Puzzle" with Team Pablo, Joaquina performed "No llames lo mío nuestro" with Team Malú, and Vanesa Martín performed "Maldita dulzura" with Team Yatra. In addition to the duets, the artists took the stage individually for a solo performance. The four artists who receive the most votes from the public, regardless of which team they are on, advanced to the Grand Final.

With the advancements of Oihan Aristizabal and Kimy Touw, Sebastián Yatra became the debuting coach in the history of the show to bring two artists to the Grand Final. Furthermore, Pablo López and Malú successfully brought their team to the Grand Final, both being represented with one artist; this season marks the first time Malú has brought an artist to the Grand Final since the fifth season. With the eliminations of Javier Barrera and Pedro Henrique, Mika no longer has any artists on his team, marking the first time a debuting coach does not have any artists in the Grand Final. Additionally, it is also the first instance in which Mika has no artists advancing to finals on his team (counting his eight seasons on The Voice France).

Week 2: Semi-Final color key
Artist was saved by public's vote and advanced to the Grand Final
Artist was eliminated

Semi-finals results
Episode	Coach	Order	Artist	Song	Result
Episode 12 (12 December)	Malú	1	Audrey	"Saving All My Love for You"	Public's Vote
Episode 12 (12 December)	Sebastián Yatra	2	Oihan Aristizabal	"Como una ola"	Public's Vote
Episode 12 (12 December)	Mika	3	Javier Barrera	"¿Y si fuera ella?"	Eliminated
Episode 12 (12 December)	Pablo López	4	Antía Pinal	"Quererte bonito"	Public's Vote
Episode 12 (12 December)	Mika	5	Pedro Henrique	"Beautiful"	Eliminated
Episode 12 (12 December)	Sebastián Yatra	6	Kimy Touw	"Before You Go"	Public's Vote
Episode 12 (12 December)	Malú	7	Victoria Rosales	"¿Cómo pagarte?"	Eliminated
Episode 12 (12 December)	Pablo López	8	Aroa Salaño	"Bésame bonito"	Eliminated

=== Week 3: Grand Final ===
The Grand Final aired on 19 December 2025. In the final round, the four finalists have to each sing a duet with one of the guests and then take the stage with a solo performance.

Antía Pinal was announced as the winner of the season, marking Pablo López's second win as a coach on the main version of the show (fourth overall).

Week 3: Grand Final Results
Episode	Coach	Artist	Order	Solo	Order	Duet with Guest	Results
Episode 13 (19 December)	Pablo López	Antía Pinal	1	"Complicidad"	7	"Se ha acabado el show" (with Ana Torroja)	Winner
Episode 13 (19 December)	Sebastián Yatra	Kimy Touw	6	"Someone You Loved"	2	"Baila morena" (with Sergio Dalma)	Fourth place
Episode 13 (19 December)	Sebastián Yatra	Oihan Aristizabal	3	"Quédate conmigo"	8	"Si te vuelvo a llamar" (with Beret)	Runner-up
Episode 13 (19 December)	Malú	Audrey	4	"I'll Never Love Again"	5	"Sé" (with David Bustamante)	Third place

Non-competition performances
Order	Performers	Song
1	Laura Pausini	"Mi Historia Entre Tus Dedos"
2	Pablo López, Malú, and the finalists	"Lo saben mis zapatos" & "Blanco y negro"
3	Pablo Alborán	"Mis 36"
4	Pablo López	"El niño del espacio"
5	Mika	"Modern Times"
6	Melody, Blanca Paloma, and Pastora Soler	"Qué sabe nadie" / "Cómo yo te amo" / "Una estrella en el jardín"
7	Sebastián Yatra	"Canción para regresar"
8	Past La Voz flamenco artists (Rafael "El Bomba", Beli, Ana González, Nereida, Diego, Luis "El Granaino")	"Se nos rompió el amor"
9	Malú	"El intento"
10	Edurne and the finalists	"Santa Claus Is Comin' to Town"

== Elimination chart ==
Artist's info

- Team Mika
- Team Pablo
- Team Malú
- Team Yatra

Result details

- Winner
- Runner-up
- Third place
- Fourth place
- Saved by the public
- Saved by her/his coach
- Eliminated

Live shows results per week
Artists	Week 1	Week 2	Week 3 Finale
Antía Pinal	Safe	Safe	Winner
Oihan Aristizabal	Safe	Safe	Runner-up
Audrey	Safe	Safe	Third place
Kimy Touw	Safe	Safe	Fourth place
Aroa Salaño	Safe	Eliminated	Eliminated (Semi-final)
Javier Barrera	Safe	Eliminated	Eliminated (Semi-final)
Pedro Henrique	Safe	Eliminated	Eliminated (Semi-final)
Victoria Rosales	Safe	Eliminated	Eliminated (Semi-final)
Cayetano Fernández	Eliminated	Eliminated (Week 1)	
Diva Barbosa	Eliminated	Eliminated (Week 1)	
El Gato CHP	Eliminated	Eliminated (Week 1)	
Elena Santana	Eliminated	Eliminated (Week 1)	
Estefanía Gaitan	Eliminated	Eliminated (Week 1)	
Ferran Amador	Eliminated	Eliminated (Week 1)	
Jake Miagra	Eliminated	Eliminated (Week 1)	
Nayo	Eliminated	Eliminated (Week 1)	
