= Max Taylor (musician) =

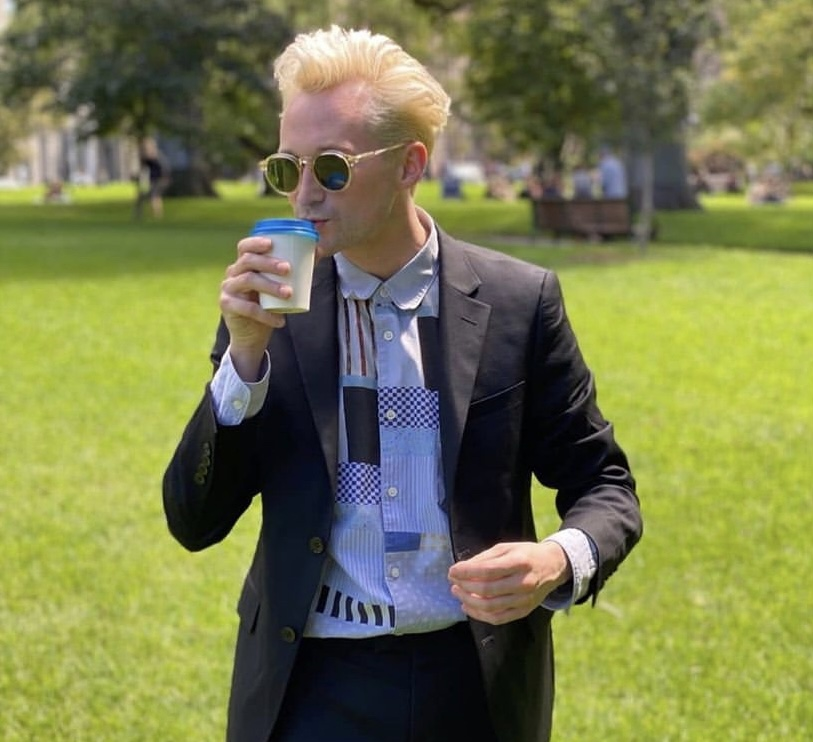

Background information
- Also known as: Creepy Neighbour
- Born: Max Taylor; 25 October 1985 (age 40); London, England
- Genres: Pop
- Instruments: Bass, guitar, keyboard
- Label: The state51 Conspiracy (2021)
- Website: https://www.maxtaylormusic.com

Max Taylor (born 25 October 1985) is a British singer-songwriter and multi-instrumentalist from East London.

He is a touring and recording musician with Mika, whom he has accompanied on albums and international tours since 2012, primarily on bass guitar and backing vocals. Taylor has also worked with artists including Groove Armada, Tom Vek, Rae Morris, Melanie C, CocknBullKid and Fryars.

== Early work ==
Taylor first came to attention as a member of the band Clor, where he performed alongside his brother Harry Bennett, who played drums. During this period he also toured with British rapper Roots Manuva and began collaborating as a session musician with a range of artists and bands.

He has also played bass for the British pop singer Lily Allen and also for Fryars. In 2012, Taylor met Mika, and recorded bass for him on a few songs from his album "The Origin Of Love", which included a collaboration with Pharrell Williams on the song "Celebrate". That was the start of their collaboration which hasn't ended.

== Work with Mika ==
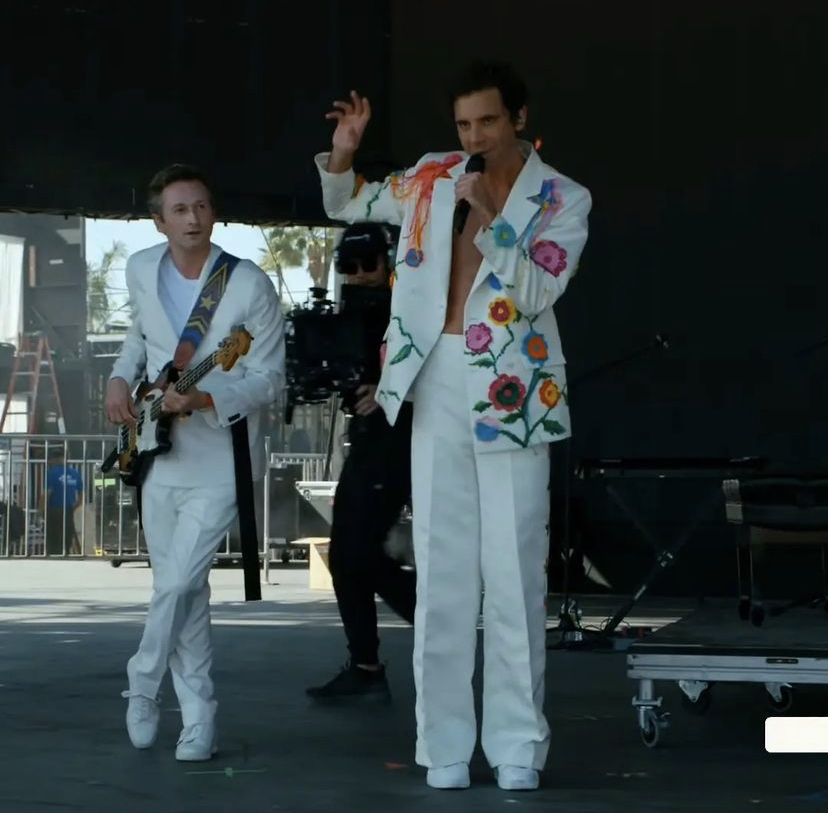
Taylor (left) on the stage of Coachella with Mika (April 2022)

In 2012 Taylor began working with Mika, recording bass on several tracks for the album The Origin of Love, including the single “Celebrate”, a collaboration with Pharrell Williams.

== Solo projects ==
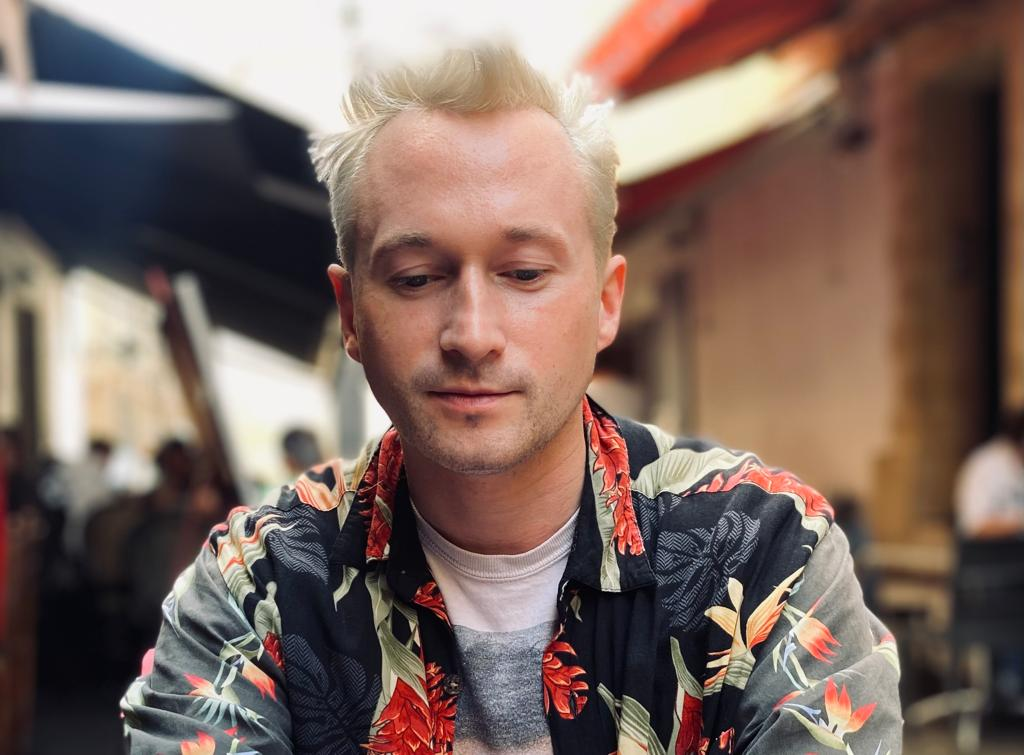
Taylor signing autographs in 2022

In October 2020 Taylor launched a solo project under the pseudonym Creepy Neighbour, alongside his ongoing work as a session and touring musician. He released the single "Millionaire Spaceman" under the pseudonym of Creepy Neighbour, followed by an EP, and in December 2021 issued his first full-length album, Debut Album

From 2022 he began releasing music under his own name, Max Taylor. After putting out the single “Shapes”, he joined Tom Vek on a three-week UK tour as a support act in 2023.
