= Talk About You =

Talk About You may refer to:

- "Talk About You", a 2008 song by The Maybes?
- "Talk About You", a 2015 song by Mika
- "Talk About You", a 2021 song by Daisuke Ishiwatari

== See also ==
- I Wanna Talk About You, Tete Montoliu
- I Want to Talk About You, David Murray
