= La Voz (Spanish TV series) season 11 =

La Voz
- Season 11
- Hosted by: Eva González
- Coaches: Luis Fonsi; Pablo López; Malú; Antonio Orozco
- Winner: Manuel Ayra
- Winning coach: Antonio Orozco
- Runner-up: Lola Eme

Release
- Original network: Antena 3
- Original release: 13 September – 20 December 2024

Season chronology
- Next → Season 12

The eleventh season of La Voz started airing on 13 September 2024 on Antena 3. Luis Fonsi, Pablo López, Malú, and Antonio Orozco all returned as coaches from the previous season, for their fifth, sixth, eighth, and seventh seasons, respectively.

Manuel Ayra was announced the winner of the eleventh season, marking Antonio Orozco's third (and fifth overall on all versions of the show) win as a coach. With Ayra's win, Orozco became the first coach on the main version of the show to win three times. Additionally, Ayra also became the second winner of La Voz who previously participated in La Voz Kids, after Javier Crespo, which both made into the finals of season 6 of La Voz Kids.

== Panelists ==
=== Coaches & Host ===
La Voz Season 11 Coaches and Hosts

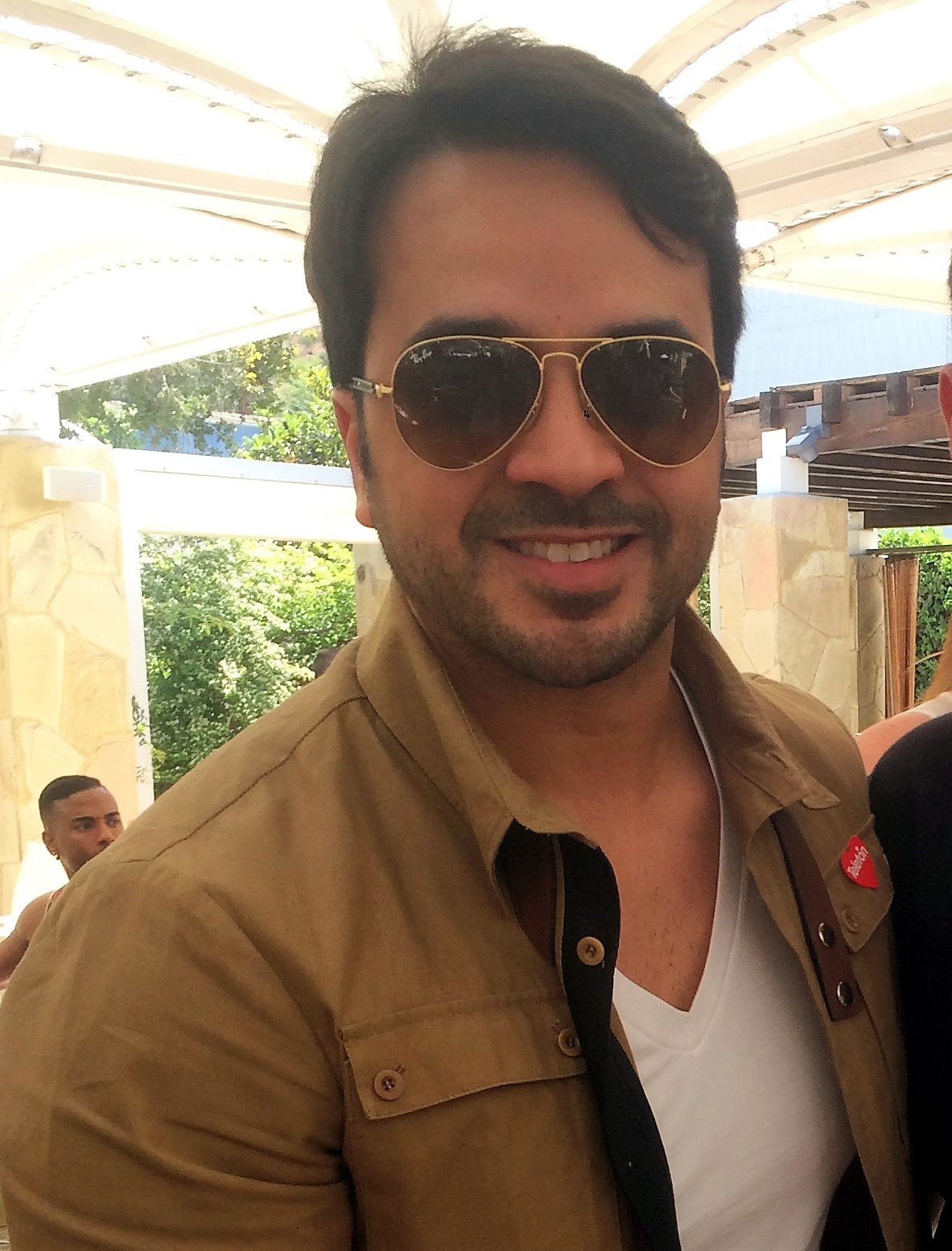
Luis Fonsi

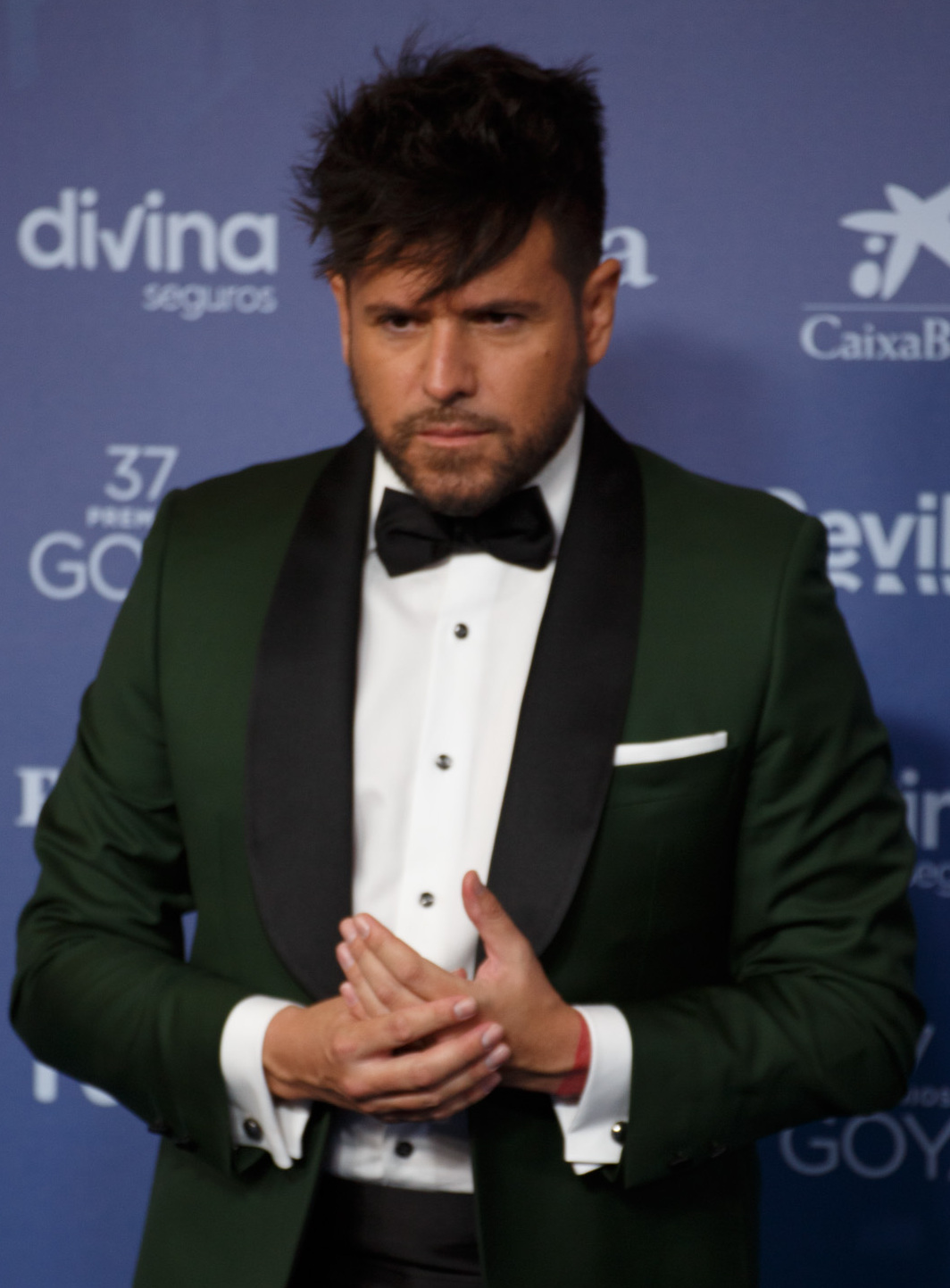
Pablo López

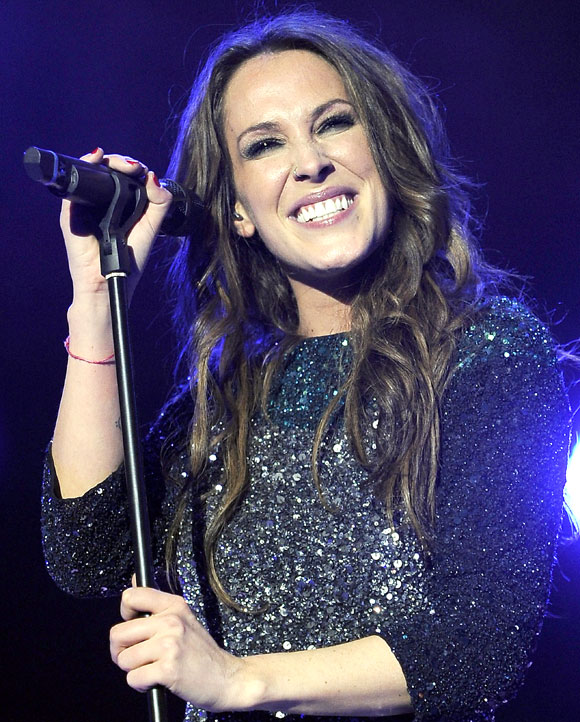
Malú

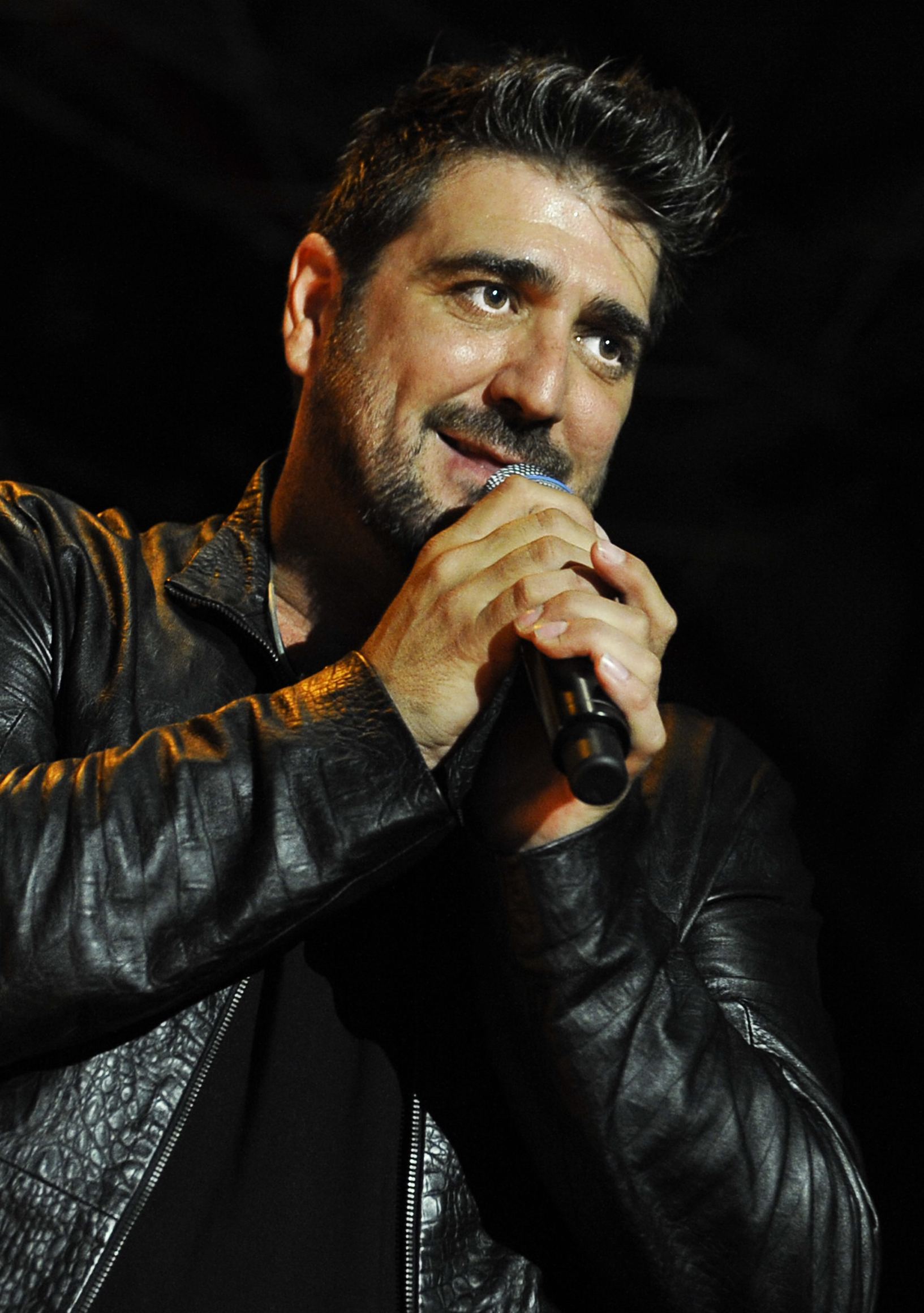
Antonio Orozco

It was announced on 19 August 2024 that all coaches from the previous series; Luis Fonsi, Pablo López, Malú, and Antonio Orozco; would return for the eleventh season. Meanwhile, Eva González returned as the host for her sixth season.

=== Advisors ===
In the battles, each coach brought in an advisor(s) for their team: Rosario Flores for Team Fonsi, Mika for Team Pablo, Prince Royce for Team Malú, and Dani Fernández for Team Antonio. All advisors returned in the knockouts, except for Mika. Vanesa Martín served as an advisor to Team Pablo for episode 8, while Álvaro de Luna, served as an advisor for episode 9.

== Teams ==
- Winner
- Runner-up
- Third Place
- Fourth Place
- Artist was Eliminated in Semifinal
- Artist was Eliminated in Quarter-Final
- Artist was Eliminated in the Phase 2 of Knockouts
- Artist was Stolen in the Phase 1 of Knockouts
- Artist was Eliminated in the Phase 1 of Knockouts
- Artist was Eliminated in The Great Battles

Coach	Top 56 Artists				
Luis Fonsi	Alan Brizuela	Ricardo Alonso	Rocío Torío	La Jose	Lucas Silveira
Luis Fonsi	Carla Martínez	~~Gara Alemán~~	~~Yael Meta~~	Chris Cardona	Federico Furia
Luis Fonsi	Irina Avramenko	Karla Ferri	Lucy Calcines	Marta Suárez	Rafa Díaz
Pablo López	Lola Eme	Gara Alemán	Jaime Allepuz	Pol Cardona	Pablo Galiñanes
Pablo López	Paula González	Christian Ruiz	Danel Arteaga	Alba Blasco	Coco Green
Pablo López	Fede Fend	Jessica Garcés	Laura Picar	Nerea Gregorio	Sergio Cepeda
Malú	Diego García	Erwin Hernández	Salvador Rodríguez	Yael Meta	Rorro
Malú	Úrsula Sánchez	~~Flori~~	~~Lucas Silveira~~	Anastasia Chevazhevskaya	Carol Magagna
Malú	Gala López	Marga Mbade	Marta Rey	Rafa Ruiz	Zuleira Aguirre
Antonio Orozco	Manuel Ayra	Flori	Ginés Gonzalez	Carlos Gómez	Claudia Reche
Antonio Orozco	José Jiménez	Los Tirantitos	Paquito Carmona	Alba Mata	Carril Bici
Antonio Orozco	Genevieve Pepin	Iva Shtuchka	Leila Claud	Patricia San Martín	Santiago Juárez
Note: Italicized names are stolen artists (names struck through within former teams).

== Blind Auditions ==
Blind auditions color key
✔	Coach pressed "I WANT YOU" button
	Artist selected a coach's team
	Artist defaulted to a coach's team
	Artist was eliminated with no coach pressing their button and was not given a second chance by the coaches
	Artist was eliminated, but got a second chance by the coaches
	Artist received a 'four-chair-turn'
✘	Coach pressed "I WANT YOU" button, but was blocked by another coach from getting the artist
✘	Coach pressed "I WANT YOU" button, but was superblocked by another coach from getting the artist
	Blocked by Fonsi; Blocked by Pablo; Blocked by Malú; Blocked by Antonio

=== Blind Auditions Results ===
Episode	Order	Artist	Song	Coach's and artist's choices			
Episode	Order	Artist	Song	Fonsi	Pablo	Malú	Antonio
Episode 1 (13 September)	1	Rafa Díaz	"The Final Countdown" / "Nessun dorma"	✔	—	✔	✔
Episode 1 (13 September)	2	Lola Eme	"Fuentes de Ortíz"	✘	✔	✘	✔
Episode 1 (13 September)	3	Ginés Gonzalez	"Contigo"	—	✘	✘	✔
Episode 1 (13 September)	4	Haridian León	"Ya Te Olvidé"	—	—	—	—
Episode 1 (13 September)	5	Pablo Galiñanes	"El Sitio de Mi Recreo"	✔	✔	✔	✔
Episode 1 (13 September)	6	Alan Brizuela	"A Song for You"	✔	—	✔	—
Episode 1 (13 September)	7	Claudia Reche	"Requiem"	—	—	✔	✔
Episode 1 (13 September)	8	Gala López	"I'll Never Love Again"	—	—	—	—
Episode 1 (13 September)	9	Salvador Rodríguez	"Nuestros sueños"	—	—	✔	—
Episode 1 (13 September)	10	Carla Martínez	"God Is a Woman"	✔	✔	✔	✔
Episode 1 (13 September)	11	Carol Magagna	"Uguale a lei"	—	—	✔	—
Episode 1 (13 September)	12	Carril Bici	"El misterio"	—	—	—	✔
Episode 2 (20 September)	1	Lucas Silveira	"If I Ain't Got You"	✘	✘	✔	✘
Episode 2 (20 September)	2	Rocío Torío	"Sakura"	✔	✔	✔	✔
Episode 2 (20 September)	3	Coco Green	"You're the One That I Want"	✘	✔	—	✔
Episode 2 (20 September)	4	Yael Meta	"Lay Me Down"	✔	✔	✔	✔
Episode 2 (20 September)	5	Lara Freyre	"All of Me"	—	—	—	—
Episode 2 (20 September)	6	Federico Furia	"Don't You Worry Child"	✔	✘	—	✘
Episode 2 (20 September)	7	Diego García	"La quiero a morir"	—	—	✔	✘
Episode 2 (20 September)	8	Javier Regueiro	"Maldita dulzura"	—	—	—	—
Episode 2 (20 September)	9	Christian Ruiz	"Dancing on My Own"	✔	✔	✔	✔
Episode 2 (20 September)	10	Leila Claud	"La flor"	✔	✔	—	✔
Episode 2 (20 September)	11	Carlos Gómez	"Dulce introducción al caos"	✔	—	—	✔
Episode 2 (20 September)	12	Albert Nieto	"Me gusta"	—	—	—	—
Episode 2 (20 September)	13	Lucy Calcines	"Butter"	✔	—	✔	—
Episode 3 (27 September)	1	Gala López	"Contigo en la distancia"	✔	✔	✔	✔
Episode 3 (27 September)	2	Laura Picar	"Creep"	—	✔	—	✘
Episode 3 (27 September)	3	Los Tirantitos	"Gloria a ti"	—	—	—	✔
Episode 3 (27 September)	4	Jessica Santín	"Run to You"	—	—	—	—
Episode 3 (27 September)	5	Erwin Hernández	"Cry Me a River"	✘	—	✔	✘
Episode 3 (27 September)	6	Débora Teixeira	"The Climb"	—	—	—	—
Episode 3 (27 September)	7	Alba Mata	"No necesito más"	—	—	✔	✔
Episode 3 (27 September)	8	Rafa Ruiz	"Miénteme"	—	—	✔	—
Episode 3 (27 September)	9	Jaime Allepuz	"El hombre del piano"	—	✔	—	✔
Episode 3 (27 September)	10	Raúl Bagán	"Fuentes de Ortiz"	—	—	—	—
Episode 3 (27 September)	11	Alba Blasco	"Cigarettes"	—	✔	—	—
Episode 3 (27 September)	12	Carlos Pérez	"Estrella"	—	—	—	—
Episode 3 (27 September)	13	Ricardo Alonso	"¿Y cómo es él?"	✔	—	—	✔
Episode 4 (4 October)	1	Nerea Gregorio	"Cristal"	✘	✔	✘	✔
Episode 4 (4 October)	2	Flori	"No Time to Die"	—	—	✔	—
Episode 4 (4 October)	3	Sergio Cepeda	"Copenhague"	✔	✔	—	—
Episode 4 (4 October)	4	Adrián Orozco	"Where Is My Mind?"	—	—	—	—
Episode 4 (4 October)	5	Genevieve Pepin	"Pour que tu m'aimes encore"	✔	—	—	✔
Episode 4 (4 October)	6	La Jose	"¿Cómo fue?"	✔	—	✔	✔
Episode 4 (4 October)	7	Lucía González	"Rise Up"	—	—	—	—
Episode 4 (4 October)	8	Anastasia Chevazhevskaya	"Defying Gravity"	—	—	✔	—
Episode 4 (4 October)	9	Gara Alemán	"Nana triste"	✔	✘	✘	✘
Episode 4 (4 October)	10	Marga Mbade	"Ain't Nobody"	—	—	✔	—
Episode 4 (4 October)	11	María Díaz	"Tómame o déjame"	—	—	—	—
Episode 4 (4 October)	12	Marta Suárez	"La despedida"	✔	—	—	—
Episode 5 (11 October)	1	Pol Cardona	"Have a Little Faith in Me"	—	✔	—	✔
Episode 5 (11 October)	2	Manuel Ayra	"Prometo"	—	—	—	✔
Episode 5 (11 October)	3	María González	"Somewhere Over the Rainbow"	—	—	—	—
Episode 5 (11 October)	4	Úrsula Sánchez	"Si a veces hablo de ti"	—	—	✔	—
Episode 5 (11 October)	5	Chris Cardona	"Best Part"	✔	✔	—	—
Episode 5 (11 October)	6	Laura Low	"Mafiosa"	—	—	—	—
Episode 5 (11 October)	7	Zuleira Aguirre	"I Have Nothing"	—	—	✔	—
Episode 5 (11 October)	8	José Jiménez	"Regálame la silla"	—	—	✘	✔
Episode 5 (11 October)	9	Gaizka Fernandez	"In the Stars"	—	—	—	—
Episode 5 (11 October)	10	Marta Rey	"I'd Rather Go Blind"	—	—	✔	—
Episode 5 (11 October)	11	Paquito Carmona	"Novia moderna"	—	—	—	✔
Episode 5 (11 October)	12	Gabriel Kazz	"Sexual Healing"	—	—	—	—
Episode 5 (11 October)	13	Rorro	"Qué dirías ahora"	—	✘	✔	—
Episode 6 (18 October)	1	Irina Avramenko	"O mio babbino caro"	✔	—	Team full	✔
Episode 6 (18 October)	2	Jessica Garcés	"Toxic"	—	✔	Team full	—
Episode 6 (18 October)	3	Patricia San Martín	"Y busqué"	—	—	Team full	✔
Episode 6 (18 October)	4	Karla Ferri	"Unstoppable"	✔	—	Team full	—
Episode 6 (18 October)	5	Carlos Hernández	"Salitre"	Team full	—	Team full	—
Episode 6 (18 October)	6	Santiago Juárez	"Palabras de amor"	Team full	✘	Team full	✔
Episode 6 (18 October)	7	Paula González	"Pa"	Team full	✔	Team full	✘
Episode 6 (18 October)	8	Fede Fend	"La mia storia tra le dita"	Team full	✔	Team full	—
Episode 6 (18 October)	9	Alva Bayo	"La fama"	Team full	—	Team full	—
Episode 6 (18 October)	10	Danel Arteaga	"Sorry Seems to Be the Hardest Word"	Team full	✔	Team full	—
Episode 6 (18 October)	11	Iva Schtuchka	"I Surrender"	Team full	Team full	Team full	✔

== Great Battles ==
The great battles aired on 25 October 2024. This season, the artists are placed in groups of either three, four, five, or six and their coach elects multiple, one, or no winner(s) to the Knockouts. In addition, coaches' advisors help them on deciding who will be advancing to the next round; Rosario Flores for Team Fonsi, Mika for Team Pablo, Prince Royce for Team Malú, and Dani Fernández for Team Antonio.

Battles color key
Artist was chosen by his/her coach to advance to the Knockouts
Artist was eliminated

=== Episode 7 (25 October) ===
Seventh episode's results
Order	Coach	Winner	Songs	Losers
1	Antonio Orozco	Paquito Carmona	"Vida Loca"	Santiago Juárez
1	Antonio Orozco	Ginés Gonzalez	"Vida Loca"	Santiago Juárez
1	Antonio Orozco	Manuel Ayra	"Vida Loca"	Santiago Juárez
1	Antonio Orozco	Carlos Gómez	"Vida Loca"	Santiago Juárez
2	Antonio Orozco	N/A	"Against All Odds (Take a Look at Me Now)"	Genevieve Pepin
2	Antonio Orozco	N/A	"Against All Odds (Take a Look at Me Now)"	Iva Shtuchka
2	Antonio Orozco	N/A	"Against All Odds (Take a Look at Me Now)"	Leila Claud
2	Antonio Orozco	N/A	"Against All Odds (Take a Look at Me Now)"	Patricia San Martín
2	Antonio Orozco	N/A	"Against All Odds (Take a Look at Me Now)"	Alba Mata
3	Antonio Orozco	Los Tirantitos	"Tu calorro"	Carril Bici
3	Antonio Orozco	José Jiménez	"Tu calorro"	Carril Bici
3	Antonio Orozco	Claudia Reche	"Tu calorro"	Carril Bici
4	Pablo López	Pol Cardona	"Nothing Compares 2 U"	Fede Fend
4	Pablo López	Danel Arteaga	"Nothing Compares 2 U"	Coco Green
4	Pablo López	Christian Ruiz	"Nothing Compares 2 U"	Coco Green
5	Pablo López	Pablo Galiñanes	"Insurrección"	Sergio Cepeda
5	Pablo López	Jaime Allepuz	"Insurrección"	Sergio Cepeda
6	Pablo López	Paula González	"Mujer contra mujer"	Jessica Garcés
6	Pablo López	Paula González	"Mujer contra mujer"	Nerea Gregorio
6	Pablo López	Lola Eme	"Mujer contra mujer"	Alba Blasco
6	Pablo López	Lola Eme	"Mujer contra mujer"	Laura Picar
7	Malú	Salvador Rodríguez	"Menos mal"	Rafa Ruiz
7	Malú	Diego García	"Menos mal"	Rafa Ruiz
7	Malú	Úrsula Sánchez	"Menos mal"	Rafa Ruiz
8	Malú	Lucas Silveira	"This I Promise You"	Carol Magagna
8	Malú	Erwin Hernández	"This I Promise You"	Marta Rey
8	Malú	Flori	"This I Promise You"	Marta Rey
9	Malú	Rorro	"Dancing Queen"	Marga Mbade
9	Malú	Rorro	"Dancing Queen"	Anastasia Chevazhevskaya
9	Malú	Rorro	"Dancing Queen"	Zuleira Aguirre
9	Malú	Rorro	"Dancing Queen"	Gala López
10	Luis Fonsi	Alan Brizuela	"One Sweet Day"	Chris Cardona
10	Luis Fonsi	Carla Martínez	"One Sweet Day"	Lucy Calcines
11	Luis Fonsi	N/A	"The Show Must Go On"	Rafa Díaz
11	Luis Fonsi	N/A	"The Show Must Go On"	Irina Avramenko
11	Luis Fonsi	N/A	"The Show Must Go On"	Karla Ferri
11	Luis Fonsi	N/A	"The Show Must Go On"	Federico Furia
12	Luis Fonsi	Ricardo Alonso	"Tu Recuerdo"	Marta Suárez
12	Luis Fonsi	La Jose	"Tu Recuerdo"	Marta Suárez
12	Luis Fonsi	Rocío Torío	"Tu Recuerdo"	Marta Suárez
12	Luis Fonsi	Gara Alemán	"Tu Recuerdo"	Marta Suárez
12	Luis Fonsi	Yael Meta	"Tu Recuerdo"	Marta Suárez

== Knockouts ==
In this round the remaining 28 artists, 7 per team, will compete for their spots in the Lives. Just as last season, this season the Knockouts is divided into two phases.

This season, three advisors (Rosario Flores for Team Fonsi, Prince Royce for Team Malú, and Dani Fernández for Team Antonio) in "The Great Battles" continued to be on the show in the first phase of the Knockouts.In this round, Vanesa Martín replaced Mika as the advisor for Team Pablo in Episode 8. Álvaro De Luna replaced Vanesa Martín in Episode 9.

=== Phase 1 ===
In the first phase, the seven artists on each team will perform one by one. Only one artist will receive the 'Fast-Pass (Pase Directo)' and directly advance to the Lives. Four artists will be put in the 'Danger Zone' where they will compete for two remaining spots in the second phase. In addition, each coach was given a 'Steal' to get an artist from another team to advance to the Lives. Once an artist is announced to be put into the 'Danger Zone', the coach whose 'Steal' is still available will have the chance to steal the artist. Artists who got stolen will automatically advance to the Lives. After an artist got stolen, the coach of the team then chooses another artist for the 'Danger Zone'. This procedure comes to an end once there are three artists officially in the 'Danger Zone'. The remaining artists will be eliminated in this round and won't have the chance to compete next week.

The first episode of the Knockouts features Team Fonsi and Team Pablo. Both coaches performed a song together with their advisor before their artists began to perform.

The second episode of the Knockouts features Team Malú and Team Antonio. Both coaches performed a song together with their advisor before their artists began to perform.

Knockouts (Phase 1) color key
Artist got a 'Fast-Pass' and advanced to the Lives
Artist initially put into the 'Danger Zone' but was stolen by another coach and advanced to the Lives
Artist put in the 'Danger Zone' and entered Phase 2
Artist was eliminated in Phase 1

Knockouts (Phase 1) Results
Episode	Coach	Order	Artist	Song	Results
Episode 8 (8 November)	Pablo López	1	Lola Eme	"Sargento de hierro"	Fast-Pass
Episode 8 (8 November)	Pablo López	2	Pol Cardona	"Heaven"	Danger Zone
Episode 8 (8 November)	Pablo López	3	Pablo Galiñanes	"Prefiero"	Danger Zone
Episode 8 (8 November)	Pablo López	4	Danel Arteaga	"Somewhere Only We Know"	Eliminated
Episode 8 (8 November)	Pablo López	5	Christian Ruiz	"Wish You the Best"	Eliminated
Episode 8 (8 November)	Pablo López	6	Paula González	"Aunque no sea conmigo"	Danger Zone
Episode 8 (8 November)	Pablo López	7	Jaime Allepuz	"Si te vas"	Danger Zone
Episode 8 (8 November)	Luis Fonsi	8	La Jose	"Tengo una debilidad"	Danger Zone
Episode 8 (8 November)	Luis Fonsi	9	Alan Brizuela	"Wish You the Best"	Fast-Pass
Episode 8 (8 November)	Luis Fonsi	10	Yael Meta	"Vision of Love"	Stolen by Malú
Episode 8 (8 November)	Luis Fonsi	11	Ricardo Alonso	"Me siento vivo"	Danger Zone
Episode 8 (8 November)	Luis Fonsi	12	Gara Alemán	"Dame la razón"	Stolen by Pablo
Episode 8 (8 November)	Luis Fonsi	13	Carla Martínez	"You Are the Reason"	Danger Zone
Episode 8 (8 November)	Luis Fonsi	14	Rocío Torío	"Día de enero"	Danger Zone
Episode 9 (15 November)	Malú	1	Flori	"Stand Up for Love"	Stolen by Antonio
Episode 9 (15 November)	Malú	2	Úrsula Sánchez	"Me vas a echar de menos"	Danger Zone
Episode 9 (15 November)	Malú	3	Rorro	"Out Here on My Own"	Danger Zone
Episode 9 (15 November)	Malú	4	Lucas Silveira	"All I Ask"	Stolen by Fonsi
Episode 9 (15 November)	Malú	5	Salvador Rodríguez	"La Salvadora"	Danger Zone
Episode 9 (15 November)	Malú	6	Erwin Hernández	"Faded"	Danger Zone
Episode 9 (15 November)	Malú	7	Diego García	"Volver"	Fast-Pass
Episode 9 (15 November)	Antonio Orozco	8	Claudia Reche	"Qué no daría yo"	Danger Zone
Episode 9 (15 November)	Antonio Orozco	9	Manuel Ayra	"Abril sin anestesia"	Fast-Pass
Episode 9 (15 November)	Antonio Orozco	10	Ginés Gonzalez	"Algo contigo"	Danger Zone
Episode 9 (15 November)	Antonio Orozco	11	José Jiménez	"Ya no quiero ser"	Danger Zone
Episode 9 (15 November)	Antonio Orozco	12	Paquito Carmona	"Deja que te bese"	Eliminated
Episode 9 (15 November)	Antonio Orozco	13	Carlos Gómez	"La casa por el tajado"	Danger Zone
Episode 9 (15 November)	Antonio Orozco	14	Los Tirantitos	"Vivir así es morir de amor"	Eliminated

=== Phase 2 ===
In the second phase, the remaining four artists on each team perform with an artist from a different team, for a total of eight more spots in the live shows. The two artists perform their respective blind audition songs and the winner of the public vote moves on. Due to the results being solely on the public's vote, all of a coach's 'Danger Zone' artists could move on to the live shows, or none. However, every coach had at least one 'Danger Zone' artist move on to the live shows and each coach did not have all of their artists advance. At the end of the round, three artists from Team Fonsi moved on, two from Team Pablo, two from Team Malú, and one from Team Antonio.

Knockouts (Phase 2) color key
Artist was saved by public's vote and advanced to the live shows
Artist was eliminated

Knockouts (Phase 2) results
Episode	Order	Challenger			Challenged		
Episode	Order	Coach	Song	Artist	Artist	Song	Coach
Episode 10 (22 November)	1	Malú	"Si a veces hablo de ti"	Úrsula Sánchez	La Jose	"¿Cómo fue?"	Luis Fonsi
Episode 10 (22 November)	2	Luis Fonsi	"¿Y cómo es él?"	Ricardo Alonso	Paula González	"Pa"	Pablo López
Episode 10 (22 November)	3	Pablo López	"Have a Little Faith in Me"	Pol Cardona	Carlos Gómez	"Dulce introducción al caos"	Antonio Orozco
Episode 10 (22 November)	4	Antonio Orozco	"Regálame la silla"	José Jiménez	Salvador Rodríguez	"Nuestros sueños"	Malú
Episode 10 (22 November)	5	Malú	"Qué dirías ahora"	Rorro	Jaime Allepuz	"El hombre del piano"	Pablo López
Episode 10 (22 November)	6	Luis Fonsi	"God is a Woman"	Carla Martínez	Ginés Gonzalez	"Contigo"	Antonio Orozco
Episode 10 (22 November)	7	Pablo López	"El Sitio de Mi Recreo"	Pablo Galiñanes	Rocío Torío	"Sakura"	Luis Fonsi
Episode 10 (22 November)	8	Antonio Orozco	"Requiem"	Claudia Reche	Erwin Hernández	"Cry Me a River"	Malú

== Live shows ==
=== Week 1: Quarter-Final ===
The Lives aired on 29 November 2024. The Top 16 artists performed individually for a spot in the Semi-Final. The results vary between teams. Since Team Fonsi brought the most artists to the Quarter-Final, the public chooses two of the five to advance to the Semi-Final, while Fonsi chose one more. For Teams Pablo and Malú, the public chose one artist from each respective team to move on to the Semi-Final, while Pablo and Malú chose one more from their respective team to move on. Team Antonio, bringing the least artists to the Quarter-Final, has one artist voted through to the Semi-Final by the public vote with no coach save.

Week 1: Quarter-Final color key
Artist was saved by public's vote and advanced to the Semi-Final
Artist was saved by his/her coach and advanced to the Semi-Final
Artist was eliminated

Week 1: Quarter-Final Performances & Results
Episode	Coach	Order	Artist	Song	Results
Episode 11 (29 November)	Pablo López	1	Lola Eme	"Disfruto"	Public's Vote
Episode 11 (29 November)	Pablo López	2	Gara Alemán	"Ódiame"	Pablo's Choice
Episode 11 (29 November)	Pablo López	3	Jaime Allepuz	"Live"	Eliminated
Episode 11 (29 November)	Pablo López	4	Pol Cardona	"Candle in the Wind"	Eliminated
Episode 11 (29 November)	Antonio Orozco	5	Ginés Gonzalez	"Se nos rompió el amor"	Eliminated
Episode 11 (29 November)	Antonio Orozco	6	Flori	"Purple Rain"	Eliminated
Episode 11 (29 November)	Antonio Orozco	7	Manuel Ayra	"Contigo"	Public's Vote
Episode 11 (29 November)	Malú	8	Diego García	"Y sin embargo te quiero"	Public's Vote
Episode 11 (29 November)	Malú	9	Erwin Hernández	"The Greatest Love of All"	Malú's Choice
Episode 11 (29 November)	Malú	10	Yael Meta	"Vete de mi"	Eliminated
Episode 11 (29 November)	Malú	11	Salvador Rodríguez	"No me lo creo"	Eliminated
Episode 11 (29 November)	Luis Fonsi	12	Rocío Torío	"Me cuesta tanto olvidarte"	Public's Vote
Episode 11 (29 November)	Luis Fonsi	13	Lucas Silveira	"I Won't Give Up"	Eliminated
Episode 11 (29 November)	Luis Fonsi	14	La Jose	"Nostalgias"	Eliminated
Episode 11 (29 November)	Luis Fonsi	15	Ricardo Alonso	"Ahora quién"	Public's Vote
Episode 11 (29 November)	Luis Fonsi	16	Alan Brizuela	"A Thousand Years"	Fonsi's Choice

=== Week 2: Semi-Final ===
The Semi-Final aired on 13 December 2024. For each team, the remaining artist(s) first perform with their coach and then the guest invited by their coach. Team Fonsi performed with David Bustamante, Team Pablo with Álvaro de Luna, Team Malú with Rozalén, and Team Antonio with Dani Fernández. After the duets, they took the stage individually for a solo performance. The four artists who receive the most votes from the public, regardless of which team they are on, advanced to the Grand Final.

With the advancements of Lola Eme and Gara Alemán, Pablo López, for the first time in his six seasons as a coach, brought two artists to the Grand Final. Furthermore, Luis Fonsi and Antonio Orozco successfully brought their team to the Grand Final, both being represented with one artist. For her third consecutive season as a coach, Malú is not represented in the Grand Final.

Week 2: Semi-Final color key
Artist was saved by public's vote and advanced to the Grand Final
Artist was eliminated

Semi-finals results
Episode	Coach	Order	Artist	Song	Result
Episode 12 (13 December)	Luis Fonsi	1	Alan Brizuela	"Halo"	Public's Vote
Episode 12 (13 December)	Antonio Orozco	2	Manuel Ayra	"Amiga mía"	Public's Vote
Episode 12 (13 December)	Malú	3	Diego García	"La niña de la linterna"	Eliminated
Episode 12 (13 December)	Pablo López	4	Lola Eme	"Peces de ciudad"	Public's Vote
Episode 12 (13 December)	Luis Fonsi	5	Rocío Torío	"Dónde está la vida"	Eliminated
Episode 12 (13 December)	Pablo López	6	Gara Alemán	"Si tus piernas"	Public's Vote
Episode 12 (13 December)	Malú	7	Erwin Hernández	"Anyone"	Eliminated
Episode 12 (13 December)	Luis Fonsi	8	Ricardo Alonso	"Qué lloro"	Eliminated

=== Week 3: Grand Final ===
The Grand Final aired on 20 December 2024. In the final round, the four finalists have to each sing a duet with one of the guests and then take the stage with a solo performance. At the end of the show, special guests Taburete performed with Manuel Ayra and Lola Eme, singing "Abierto en vena" and Álex Ubago performed with Alan Brizuela and Gara Alemán, singing "Yo no te olvido". Manuel Ayra was announced as the winner of the season, marking Antonio Orozco's third win as a coach.

At the start of the show, the finalists performed "Gracias por la música" to kick off the Grand Final.

Week 3: Grand Final Results
Episode	Coach	Artist	Order	Solo	Order	Duet with Guest	Results
Episode 13 (20 December)	Pablo López	Lola Eme	5	"Días de verano"	1	"Objetos perdidos" / "El nudo" (with Vanesa Martín)	Runner-up
Episode 13 (20 December)	Antonio Orozco	Manuel Ayra	6	"Tanto"	2	"La mala costumbre" (with Pastora Soler)	Winner
Episode 13 (20 December)	Luis Fonsi	Alan Brizuela	3	"Impossible"	7	"¿Volverá?" (with Coque Malla)	Third place
Episode 13 (20 December)	Pablo López	Gara Alemán	8	"Te has perdido quién soy"	4	"Ese beso" (with Rosario Flores)	Fourth place

== Elimination chart ==
Artist's info

- Team Fonsi
- Team Pablo
- Team Malú
- Team Antonio

Result details

- Winner
- Runner-up
- Third place
- Fourth place
- Saved by the public
- Saved by her/his coach
- Eliminated

Live shows results per week
Artists	Week 1	Week 2	Week 3 Finale
Manuel Ayra	Safe	Safe	Winner
Lola Eme	Safe	Safe	Runner-up
Alan Brizuela	Safe	Safe	Third place
Gara Alemán	Safe	Safe	Fourth place
Diego García	Safe	Eliminated	Eliminated (Semi-final)
Erwin Hernández	Safe	Eliminated	Eliminated (Semi-final)
Ricardo Alonso	Safe	Eliminated	Eliminated (Semi-final)
Rocío Torío	Safe	Eliminated	Eliminated (Semi-final)
Flori	Eliminated	Eliminated (Week 1)	
Ginés Gonzalez	Eliminated	Eliminated (Week 1)	
Jaime Allepuz	Eliminated	Eliminated (Week 1)	
La Jose	Eliminated	Eliminated (Week 1)	
Lucas Silveira	Eliminated	Eliminated (Week 1)	
Pol Cardona	Eliminated	Eliminated (Week 1)	
Salvador Rodríguez	Eliminated	Eliminated (Week 1)	
Yael Meta	Eliminated	Eliminated (Week 1)	
