= Underwater (Mika song) =

Single by Mika

from the album The Origin of Love
- Released: 23 November 2012
- Recorded: 2012
- Genre: Pop
- Length: 3:08
- Label: Barclay; Casablanca
- Songwriters: Mika; Nick Littlemore; Paul Steel
- Producers: Greg Wells; Mika

Mika singles chronology
"Celebrate" (2012)	"Underwater" (2012)	"Origin of Love" (2012)

Music video
- "Underwater" on YouTube

"Underwater" is a song by singer-songwriter Mika, released as the album's third single in France, and the second single in Europe from his third studio album, The Origin of Love.

== Background ==
The single peaked at #12 in France. The single was not released in the United Kingdom, and instead, the single's artwork was adapted for the British equivalent single release, "Origin of Love".

The song was featured in a Swatch Scuba Libre Collection TV Commercial advert, becoming one of the most successful singles.

== Music video ==
The music video for the track was released on YouTube on 21 November 2012. It was filmed in Los Angeles during the third week of October, and premiered on 21 November 2012, just two days' before the single's official release.

The music video features Mika afloat on an ocean of cloth in a small, makeshift boat, along with several treasures, including a glowing burlap sack. As the song progresses, the waves get choppier, rocking the boat and knocking various items into the cloth "water". At one point, a rope snaps from the mast, forcing Mika to hold it up, until a particularly strong wave knocks both him and the burlap sack into the sea. As Mika retrieves the sack underwater, he notices people dancing in the ocean around him. As he watches them, the ropes from the mast get tangled around his body, trapping him. The sea people surround Mika, snatch the burlap sack from him, and swim away, leaving him to sink as the song ends.

== Charts ==
=== Weekly charts ===
Chart (2012–13)	Peak position
Austria (Ö3 Austria Top 40)	68
Belgium (Ultratip Bubbling Under Flanders)	7
Belgium (Ultratop 50 Wallonia)	27
France (SNEP)	12
Germany (GfK)	46
Italy (FIMI)	14
Switzerland (Schweizer Hitparade)	25

=== Year-end charts ===
Chart (2013)	Position
Belgium (Ultratop Wallonia)	96
France (SNEP)	78

=== Certifications ===
Region	Certification	Certified units/sales
Italy (FIMI)	Gold	15,000^{*}
^{*} Sales figures based on certification alone.
