= Elle me dit =

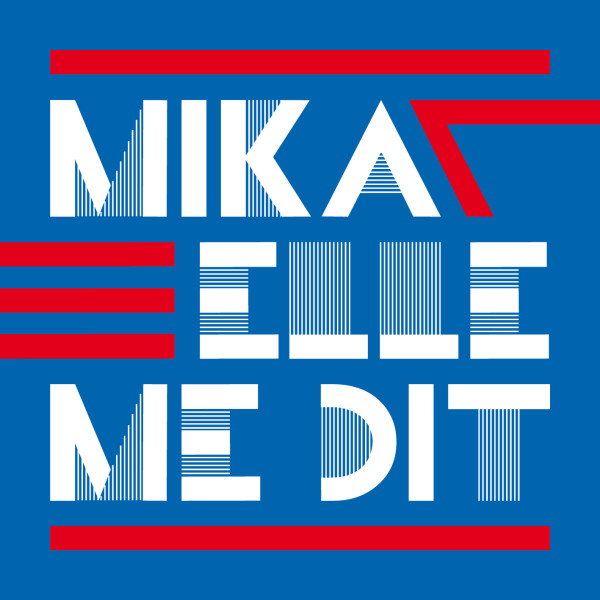

Single by Mika

from the album The Origin of Love
- Released: 11 July 2011
- Recorded: 2011
- Genre: Pop; dance-pop; electropop; power pop
- Length: 3:38
- Label: Barclay; Casablanca
- Songwriters: Mika; Doriand
- Producers: Greg Wells; Klas Ahlund

Mika singles chronology
"Kick Ass (We Are Young)" (2010)	"Elle me dit" (2011)	"Celebrate" (2012)

Audio sample
- file; help

Music video
- "Elle me dit" on YouTube

"Elle me dit" (English: She Tells Me) is a song by Lebanese-born British singer and songwriter Mika, released as a single in France ahead of the release of his third studio album, The Origin of Love. Mika re-recorded the song in English under the title "Emily". "Emily" is included on the standard track listing of The Origin of Love, while "Elle me dit" is featured as a bonus track on the French standard edition of the album, and all international deluxe editions. The song was released on 11 July 2011.

== Background ==
The song was first rumoured when a twelve-second preview was published online on 1 July 2011. Just ten days later, the French iTunes Store made the whole song available as a digital download. However, its official release did not occur until 26 September 2011. Lyrically, the song is "about all the horrific things a mother can say to her son to get him to get out of her house".

A first English version named "She tells me" was sung live, with lyrics very close to the initial meaning. The commercially released version switched the focus to an Emily character with the singer being the one bossing her around.

== Music video ==
The music video directed by Kinga Burza was released on 16 August 2011. The video shows a family dancing and singing along to the song individually, as well as clips of the family members arguing and behaving mischievously. The video features a well-known ensemble of French actors, including Fanny Ardant, Marie-Clotilde Ramos-Ibanez, Patrice Pujol and Axel Huet.

== In other media ==
The song "Elle Me Dit" is briefly featured in the 2017 film "Pitch Perfect 3".

== Track listing ==
Digital download
No.	Title	Length
1.	"Elle me dit"	3:38

CD single
No.	Title	Length
1.	"Elle me dit" (Radio Edit)	3:27
2.	"Elle me dit" (Beataucue Remix)	5:14

== Chart performance ==
Chart (2011–2014)	Peak position
Belgium (Ultratop 50 Flanders)	9
Belgium Dance (Ultratop Flanders)	36
Belgium (Ultratop 50 Wallonia)	1
Belgium Dance (Ultratop Wallonia)	1
Canada Hot 100 (Billboard)	43
France (SNEP)	1
Slovakia Airplay (ČNS IFPI)	65
South Korea (GAON)	129
South Korea International Songs (GAON)	7
Switzerland (Schweizer Hitparade)	16

=== Year-end charts ===
Year	Chart	Position
2011	Belgian Singles Chart (Flanders)	74
2011	Belgian Singles Chart (Wallonia)	14
2011	Belgian Dance Singles Chart (Wallonia)	7
2011	French Singles Chart	8
2011	South Korea International Singles Chart	147
2012	French Singles Chart	101

=== Certifications ===
Region	Certification	Certified units/sales
Belgium (BRMA)	Gold	10,000^{*}
^{*} Sales figures based on certification alone.

== Release history ==
Country	Release date	Format(s)
Australia	11 July 2011	Digital download
France	11 July 2011	Digital download
Spain	11 July 2011	Digital download
France	26 September 2011	CD single
