= The Origin of Love =

Studio album by Mika
- Released: 17 September 2012
- Recorded: 2011–12
- Genres: Pop; dance-pop
- Length: 45:19
- Labels: Casablanca; Barclay
- Producers: Klas Åhlund; Benny Benassi; Fryars; Nick Littlemore; Peter Mayes; Mika; Greg Wells; Dan Wilson

Mika chronology
The Boy Who Knew Too Much (2009)	The Origin of Love (2012)	No Place in Heaven (2015)

Singles from The Origin of Love
- 1. "Elle me dit" Released: 11 July 2011; 2. "Celebrate" Released: 15 June 2012; 3. "Underwater" Released: 5 October 2012; 4. "Origin of Love" Released: 3 December 2012; 5. "Popular Song" Released: 21 December 2012

Professional ratings
Aggregate scores
Source	Rating
Metacritic	(69/100)
Review scores
Source	Rating
AllMusic	3/5 stars
The Arts Desk	2/5 stars
entertainment.ie	4/5 stars
The Guardian	4/5 stars
Idolator	4/5 stars
London Evening Standard	3/5 stars
MusicOMH	2.5/5 stars
The Observer	2/5 stars
PopMatters	5/10
The Scotsman	2/5 stars

The Origin of Love is the third studio album released by British singer-songwriter Mika. The album was released in France on 17 September 2012, and in the United Kingdom on 8 October 2012, via Casablanca Records and Barclay Records respectively. The album was preceded by an alternate lead single in each region. "Elle me dit" was first released in France, whereas "Celebrate" served as the first official single for the United Kingdom.

== Background ==
Mika's second studio album, The Boy Who Knew Too Much, was released in September 2009. It garnered positive critical reviews upon release, and debuted at its peak position of number four on the UK Albums Chart.

Mika worked with Greg Wells, Dan Wilson, Nick Littlemore and Klas Åhlund on The Origin of Love. The team contributed both written material and production credits. Mika was confirmed to be recording the album in various locations, including Montreal, Miami and Sweden. In an interview for Digital Spy, Mika described the album as "more simplistic pop, less layered than the last one". He also described the album's themes as dealing with the adult years, claiming that "it's a serious album, but still has the boppy, happy tunes." In an interview for a popular French magazine, Mika claimed that the album's musical style would include elements of Daft Punk and Fleetwood Mac.

This album marked the beginning of the collaboration with Max Taylor (Creepy Neighbor), who from then on accompanied Mika on bass and vocals during his tours, as well as on his albums.

== Singles ==
"Elle me dit" (English: She Tells Me) was released as the album's lead single in France. The song was first rumoured when a twelve-second preview was published online on 1 July 2011. Just ten days later, the French iTunes Store made the whole song available as a digital download. However, its official release did not occur until 26 September 2011. The single was very successful, peaking at number one on the French Singles Chart. "Elle me dit" appears on the regular version of the album in English, as the track "Emily".

"Celebrate" was released as the album's lead single in the United Kingdom, Europe and the United States, and the second single in France. The single was made available in French-speaking countries on 1 June 2012. The song features American singer Pharrell Williams and was written by Mika, Williams and Fryars, and produced by Peter Mayes and Nick Littlemore. On 14 June 2012, Mika revealed a 30-second clip of the song. It was uploaded to Amazon ahead of its official unveiling the next day. The song was officially released on 15 June 2012. The single was released in the United Kingdom on 1 October 2012.

"Underwater" was released as the album's third single in France, and the second single in Europe, on 23 November 2012. The music video for the track was filmed in Los Angeles during the third week of October, and premiered on 21 November 2012, just two days' before the single's official release. The single peaked at #134 in France, becoming Mika's worst performing single in the region. The single will not be released in the United Kingdom, and instead, the single's artwork was adapted for the British equivalent single release, "The Origin of Love".

"Origin of Love" was released as the album's second single in the United Kingdom on 3 December 2012. It carried the same artwork as its European equivalent release, "Underwater", but was heavily edited for radio play. The music video for the original version of the track originally premiered on 15 September 2012, and was filmed in Chile. It featured explicit scenes of a man and a woman engaging in sex, whilst in a loving relationship. The video was shown on British music channels, but these were edited out, replacing the original version of the track with the radio version.

"Popular Song" was released as the album's second single in the United States on 21 December 2012. The song was heavily edited for its release as a single, completely rearranging the instrumentation, tempo and removing the expletives "bitch" and "shit" from the lyrics. The single version also features Ariana Grande, instead of Priscilla Renea, who appears on the album version. The single version bears a strong resemblance to Mika's debut single, "Grace Kelly".

== Commercial performance ==
In Mika's home country of the United Kingdom, The Origin of Love briefly appeared at number 24 on the UK Albums Chart, the issue dated 20 October 2012. It also was number 32 on the Scottish Albums Chart that same week, a regional chart for the UK Albums Chart. The album was the most successful in France, where it debuted at number one on the country's album chart and was certified platinum by the SNEP. The record also reached the top ten in Belgium and Korea; In Belgium, the album peaked at number seven in Flanders and number six in Wallonia, while in Korea it was number nine on the country's main album chart and topped the nation's International Albums chart. In the United States, it debuted at No. 47 on Billboard 200 with 8,500 copies sold in its first week, and has sold 33,000 copies in the US as of May 2015.

== Track listing ==
Standard edition
No.	Title	Writer(s)	Producer(s)	Length
1.	"Origin of Love"	Mika, Nick Littlemore, Paul Steel	Nick Littlemore, Greg Wells, Mika	4:37
2.	"Lola"	Mika, Benjamin Garrett, Jodi Marr	Mika, Benjamin Garrett	3:45
3.	"Stardust"	Mika, Wayne Hector, Benny Benassi, Alessandro Benassi	Benny Benassi, Wells	3:18
4.	"Make You Happy"	Mika, Garrett, Marr	Wells, Garrett, Mika	3:11
5.	"Underwater"	Mika, Littlemore, Steel	Wells, Mika	3:12
6.	"Overrated"	Mika, Marr	Klas Åhlund, Wells	3:38
7.	"Kids"	Mika, Littlemore	Mika, Littlemore	3:04
8.	"Love You When I'm Drunk"	Mika, Marr	Littlemore, Mika	2:54
9.	"Step with Me"	Mika, Mathieu Jomphe, Hillary Lindsey	Wells, Mika	3:36
10.	"Popular Song" (featuring Priscilla Renea)	Mika, Priscilla Renea, Mathieu Jomphe, Stephen Schwartz	Wells, Mika	4:06
11.	"Emily"	Mika, Doriand	Åhlund, Wells	3:34
12.	"Heroes"	Mika, Littlemore, Jack Milas, Oli Chang	Mika, Jack Milas, Oli Chang	3:16
13.	"Celebrate" (featuring Pharrell Williams)	Mika, Pharrell Williams, Garrett	Peter Mayes, Littlemore, Garrett	3:08

European bonus track
No.	Title	Writer(s)	Producer(s)	Length
14.	"Make You Happy" (Miami Edit)	Mika, Benjamin Garrett, Jodi Marr	Greg Wells, Benjamin Garrett, Mika	3:36

French edition bonus track
No.	Title	Writer(s)	Producer(s)	Length
14.	"Elle me dit"	Mika, Doriand	Klas Åhlund, Greg Wells	3:38

Deluxe edition bonus disc
No.	Title	Writer(s)	Producer(s)	Length
1.	"Celebrate" (Acoustic)	Mika, Pharrell Williams, Benjamin Garrett	Peter Mayes, Nick Littlemore, Benjamin Garrett	3:08
2.	"Origin of Love" (Acoustic)	Mika, Nick Littlemore, Paul Steel	Nick Littlemore, Greg Wells, Mika	4:37
3.	"Kids" (Acoustic)	Mika, Nick Littlemore	Mika, Nick Littlemore	3:04
4.	"Love You When I'm Drunk" (Acoustic)	Mika, Jodi Marr	Nick Littlemore, Mika	2:54
5.	"Overrated" (Acoustic)	Mika, Jodi Marr	Klas Åhlund, Greg Wells	3:38
6.	"Elle me dit"	Mika, Doriand	Greg Wells, Mika	3:38
7.	"Tah Dah"	Mika, Pharrell Williams, Jodi Marr	Peter Mayes, Nick Littlemore	3:19
8.	"Stardust" (Benny Benassi Mix)	Mika, Alessandro "Alle" Benassi	Benny Benassi, Alessandro "Alle" Benassi, Nick Littlemore	4:42
9.	"Celebrate" (Rivera Mix)	Mika, Pharrell Williams, Benjamin Garrett	Peter Mayes, Nick Littlemore, Robbie Rivera	5:09

French deluxe edition bonus disc
No.	Title	Writer(s)	Producer(s)	Length
1.	"Karen"	Mika, Doriand	Nick Littlemore, Greg Wells, Mika	3:57
2.	"L'amour dans le mauvais temps (Love in Bad Weather)"	Mika, Doriand	Mika	4:07
3.	"Un soleil mal luné (A Moody Sun)"	Mika, Doriand	Doriand, Mika	3:06
4.	"Make You Happy" (Cherokee Remix)	Mika, Benjamin Garrett, Jodi Marr	Greg Wells, Benjamin Garrett, Mika, Cherokee	5:47
5.	"Celebrate" (Rivera Remix)	Mika, Pharrell Williams, Benjamin Garrett	Nick Littlemore, Peter Mayes, Benjamin Garrett, Greg Wells, Robbie Rivera	5:53
6.	"Elle me dit" (BeatauCue Remix)	Mika, Doriand	Klas Åhlund, Greg Wells, Alex Bruaert, Mederic Martin	5:02
7.	"Make You Happy" (Miami Edit)	Mika, Benjamin Garrett, Jodi Marr	Greg Wells, Benjamin Garrett, Mika, Nick Littlemore	3:11
8.	"Tah Dah"	Mika, Pharrell Williams, Jodi Marr	Nick Littlemore, Peter Mayes, Mika	2:51

Italian deluxe edition bonus disc
No.	Title	Writer(s)	Producer(s)	Length
1.	"Origin of Love" (Italian Version)	Mika, Nick Littlemore, Paul Steel	Nick Littlemore, Greg Wells, Mika	4:37
2.	"Stardust" (Italian Version)	Mika, Wayne Hector, Benny Benassi, Alessandro Benassi	Benny Benassi, Greg Wells	3:18
3.	"Celebrate" (Acoustic)	Mika, Pharrell Williams, Benjamin Garrett	Peter Mayes, Nick Littlemore, Benjamin Garrett	3:08
4.	"Origin of Love" (Acoustic)	Mika, Nick Littlemore, Paul Steel	Nick Littlemore, Greg Wells, Mika	4:37
5.	"Kids" (Acoustic)	Mika, Nick Littlemore	Mika, Nick Littlemore	3:04
6.	"Love You When I'm Drunk" (Acoustic)	Mika, Jodi Marr	Nick Littlemore, Mika	2:54
7.	"Overrated" (Acoustic)	Mika, Jodi Marr	Klas Åhlund, Greg Wells	3:38
8.	"Elle me dit"	Mika, Doriand	Greg Wells, Mika	3:38
9.	"Tah Dah"	Mika, Pharrell Williams, Jodi Marr	Peter Mayes, Nick Littlemore	3:19
10.	"Celebrate" (Rivera Mix)	Mika, Pharrell Williams, Benjamin Garrett	Peter Mayes, Nick Littlemore, Robbie Rivera	5:09

== Charts ==
=== Weekly charts ===
Weekly chart performance for The Origin of Love
Chart (2012)	Peak position
Austrian Albums (Ö3 Austria)	31
Belgian Albums (Ultratop Flanders)	7
Belgian Albums (Ultratop Wallonia)	6
Canadian Albums (Billboard)	10
Croatian Foreign Albums (HDU)	17
Dutch Albums (Album Top 100)	15
French Albums (SNEP)	1
German Albums (Offizielle Top 100)	43
Italian Albums (FIMI)	12
Irish Albums (IRMA)	61
Japanese Albums (Oricon)	28
Mexican Albums (Top 100 Mexico)	71
Scottish Albums (Official Charts)	32
South Korean Albums (Gaon)	9
South Korean International Albums (Gaon)	1
Spanish Albums (Promusicae)	11
Swiss Albums (Schweizer Hitparade)	15
UK Albums (Official Charts)	24
US Billboard 200	47

=== Year-end charts ===
Year-end chart performance for The Origin of Love
Chart (2012)	Position
Belgian Albums (Ultratop Wallonia)	69
French Albums (SNEP)	53
South Korean International Albums (Gaon)	30

== Certifications ==
Region	Certification	Certified units/sales
France (SNEP)	Platinum	100,000^{*}
Italy (FIMI)	Gold	25,000^{*}
^{*} Sales figures based on certification alone.

== Release history ==
Region	Dates	Format(s)	Label(s)
France	17 September 2012	CD, 2CD, digital download	Barclay
Spain	21 September 2012	CD, 2CD, digital download	Casablanca
Italy	25 September 2012	CD, 2CD, digital download	Universal Music
Ireland	5 October 2012	CD, 2CD, digital download	Universal Music
Germany	5 October 2012	CD, 2CD, digital download	Universal Music
Australia	12 October 2012	CD, 2CD, digital download	Universal Music
United Kingdom	8 October 2012	CD, 2CD, digital download	Island
United States	16 October 2012	CD, 2CD, digital download	Casablanca
