= Popular Song (song) =

Single by Mika featuring Ariana Grande

from the album The Origin of Love and Yours Truly
- Released: 21 December 2012
- Recorded: 2012
- Studio: Rocket Carousel Studios (Culver City, CA); Armoury Studios (Vancouver, BC)
- Genre: Dance-pop
- Length: 4:05 (album version); 3:20 (radio edit)
- Label: Barclay; Casablanca; Republic
- Songwriters: Mika; Priscilla Renea; Mathieu Jomphe; Stephen Schwartz
- Producers: Greg Wells; Mika; Jason Nevins

Mika singles chronology
"Origin of Love" (2012)	"Popular Song" (2012)	"Live Your Life" (2013)

Ariana Grande singles chronology
"Popular Song" (2012)	"The Way" (2013)

Audio sample
- file; help

Music video
- "Popular Song" on YouTube

"Popular Song" is a song by Lebanese-British singer-songwriter Mika, released as the second single in the United States from his third studio album, The Origin of Love (2012). The song features American singer-songwriter Ariana Grande and is included on her debut album, Yours Truly (2013). The track was written by Mika, Muni Long (then known as Priscilla Renea), Mathieu Jomphe and Stephen Schwartz, and produced by Mika and Greg Wells. The radio version featuring Ariana Grande was produced by Jason Nevins. It was released as a single on 21 December 2012. It was initially sent to impact contemporary hit radio in the United States on 13 August 2013, but its release was moved up a week earlier.

The song interpolates the melody of "Popular" from the musical Wicked. The album version of the song features vocals from Renea, and features mature language. The single version replaces Renea with Ariana Grande – who would later portray Glinda in the 2024 film adaptation – removes the mature language, and modifies the instrumental arrangement and tempo to create a version which heavily links to Mika's former hits, "Grace Kelly" and "We Are Golden".

== Background ==
The original version of the song was made available on Mika's third studio album, The Origin of Love, and features vocals from songwriter Priscilla Renea. This version is based on the original from Wicked, and uses a very rough tempo and instrumentation, to fit in with the theme of the album. However, for the track's release as a single, Mika decided to completely change the arrangement, and create something similar to his hit single "Grace Kelly". To do this, he enlisted the help of American actress and performer Ariana Grande, rewrote some of the lyrics, changed the instrumentation and tempo, and reworked the song's structure.

The Jason Nevins produced version was released to the iTunes Store on 21 December 2012, being released as the album's second single in the United States.

== Music video ==
The music video was released on 29 April 2013, directed by Chris Marrs Piliero. It features a gothic theme, being set in a 'spooky, dark, "Addams Family"-esque high school'. The video features product placement from Sony and Mini. Mika uses a Sony Xperia Z to text an invitation for a dinner party to his popular classmates who are bullying him. This is interlaced with scenes of the two brewing a potion in a witch's cauldron and scenes of them falling victim to bullying. Mika and Grande return to Mika's mansion in his talking car, a 2013 Mini Cooper. At the dinner party, the bullies consume their drinks drugged with the potion, and turn to stone. They are then ruthlessly smashed into pieces by Mika and Grande, with the former using a candlestick and the latter using a food tray. However, the video ends with a twist: as Mika and Grande have a toast and the former takes a sip from his drink, the video flashes back to when the two were children and Mika is seen kicking down Grande's castle made of wooden blocks. As Grande glares coldly at him, Mika subsequently turns to stone as well. The video then ends with Grande smirking evilly at the camera. The gothic theme of the video and its vengeful nature, as well as the costume worn by Mika as he and Grande are shown 'cooking', is generally considered reminiscent of the aesthetic and plot of the Stephen Sondheim musical Sweeney Todd, tying back to the musical theatre roots of the song established in modifying a song from Wicked.

As of October 2024, the video has accumulated over 215 million views on Vevo.

== Critical reception ==
Bryon Flitsch of MTV's Buzzworthy noted that "Popular Song" is a different view of Mika's previous efforts, stating that its "peppy beat + catchy melody + playful lyrics = perfect song to bounce around to." Furthermore, Flitsch also praised Grande's vocals in the song for being "flawless" alongside Mika's. Marques Daniels of examiner.com felt that "Popular Song" is a song to inspire bullied and unpopular people to stand up. Daniels also praised the song for being a stand out track.

== Commercial performance ==
The Jason Nevins version of "Popular Song" has since peaked at number 87 in the US Billboard Hot 100, and was certified gold in 2015 by the RIAA for selling over 500,000 copies in the country.

== Charts ==
Chart performance for "Popular Song"
Chart (2013)	Peak position
Australia (ARIA)	71
Belgium (Ultratip Bubbling Under Flanders)	8
Belgium (Ultratip Bubbling Under Wallonia)	12
Netherlands (Single Top 100)	92
Romania (Romanian Top 100)	100
South Korea (Circle)	133
US Billboard Hot 100	87
US Pop Airplay (Billboard)	41

== Certifications ==
Certifications for "Popular Song"
Region	Certification	Certified units/sales
New Zealand (RMNZ)	Gold	15,000^{‡}
United Kingdom (BPI)	Silver	200,000^{‡}
United States (RIAA)	Gold	500,000^{‡}
^{‡} Sales+streaming figures based on certification alone.

== Release history ==
Release dates and formats for "Popular Song"
Region	Date	Format	Version	Label	Ref.
United States	21 December 2012	Digital download	Version featuring Ariana Grande	Casablanca	
Austria	10 January 2013	Digital download	Version featuring Ariana Grande	Casablanca	
Belgium	10 January 2013	Digital download	Version featuring Ariana Grande	Casablanca	
Denmark	10 January 2013	Digital download	Version featuring Ariana Grande	Casablanca	
Germany	10 January 2013	Digital download	Version featuring Ariana Grande	Casablanca	
Finland	10 January 2013	Digital download	Version featuring Ariana Grande	Casablanca	
France	10 January 2013	Digital download	Version featuring Ariana Grande	Casablanca	
Italy	10 January 2013	Digital download	Version featuring Ariana Grande	Casablanca	
Japan	10 January 2013	Digital download	Version featuring Ariana Grande	Casablanca	
Netherlands	10 January 2013	Digital download	Version featuring Ariana Grande	Casablanca	
Norway	10 January 2013	Digital download	Version featuring Ariana Grande	Casablanca	
Russia	10 January 2013	Digital download	Version featuring Ariana Grande	Casablanca	
Sweden	10 January 2013	Digital download	Version featuring Ariana Grande	Casablanca	
Switzerland	10 January 2013	Digital download	Version featuring Ariana Grande	Casablanca	
United Kingdom	10 January 2013	Digital download	Version featuring Ariana Grande	Casablanca	
Italy	24 January 2014	Radio airplay	Version featuring Ariana Grande	Universal	
