= El Sitio de Mi Recreo =

"El Sitio de mi Recreo"

Song by Antonio Vega

from the album Océano de sol
- Released: 1994
- Genre: Pop
- Songwriter(s): Antonio Vega
- Producer(s): Phil Manzanera

El Sitio de mi Recreo (Eng.: The Place of my Recreation) is a song written and performed by Spanish singer and songwriter Antonio Vega. It was first released on his album Océano de Sol and produced by Phil Manzanera in 1994.

Miguel Bosé recorded his own version of the song for the project Infancia Olvidada. In order to include it on the special edition of Bosé's Papito album, both performers (Bosé and Vega) re-recorded the song, produced by Rosa Leon and Bosé.
