= Songs for Sorrow =

EP by Mika
- Released: 15 May 2009
- Genre: Pop
- Length: 15:08
- Label: Casablanca
- Producer: Greg Wells, Mika

Mika chronology
Life in Cartoon Motion (2007)	Songs for Sorrow (2009)	The Boy Who Knew Too Much (2009)

Songs for Sorrow is the second EP by British-Lebanese singer-songwriter Mika. It was released in digital form on 15 May 2009, and in a limited edition book & CD physical form on 8 June 2009. The song "Blue Eyes" was used to promote the EP, and was A-listed on the BBC Radio 2 playlist. The EP received the name Songs for Sorrow because the theme of the songs is sorrow. The physical edition consists of a 68-page hard cover book, containing lyrics and illustrations of the songs. The illustrations were made by some of Mika's favourite artists from around the world.

== Track listing ==
No.	Title	Writer(s)	Length
1.	"Blue Eyes"	Mika	2:53
2.	"Lady Jane"	Mika	3:20
3.	"Lonely Alcoholic"	Mika	3:09
4.	"Toy Boy"	Mika, Jodi Marr	2:59

== List of artists ==
Artist	Song	Page number(s)
Al Columbia	"Toy Boy"	18–19
Alber Elbaz	"Lady Jane"	59
DaWack	"Toy Boy"	25
DaWack	"Blue Eyes"	46–47
David McKee	"Toy Boy"	20–21
David McKee	"Lonely Alcoholic"	38–39
Es Devlin	"Toy Boy"	28
Huck Scarry	"Lady Jane"	54–55
Jim Medway	"Toy Boy"	26–27
Jim Woodring	"Toy Boy"	13–17
Kerascoët	"Blue Eyes"	42–45
Kerascoët	"Lady Jane"	60
Nilesh Mistry	"Lady Jane"	61–66
Paul Smith	"Lady Jane"	58
Peter Blake	"Toy Boy"	22–23
Richard Hogg	"Lady Jane"	50–53
Sophie Blackall	"Lady Jane"	56–57
Tao Nyeu	"Lonely Alcoholic"	32–37
Walter Van Beirendonck	"Toy Boy"	24

== Personnel ==
- Alex Hutchinson – design and layout
- Da Wack – additional design and layout
- Jim Woodring – front cover and endpapers
- Mika – concept and art direction
- Richard Hogg – additional design and layout
