= Origin of Love =

Single by Mika

from the album The Origin of Love
- Released: 3 December 2012
- Recorded: 2011
- Genre: Baroque pop
- Length: 4:37
- Label: Barclay; Casablanca
- Songwriters: Mika; Nick Littlemore; Paul Steel
- Producers: Nick Littlemore; Greg Wells; Mika

Mika singles chronology
"Underwater" (2012)	"Origin of Love" (2012)	"Popular Song" (2012)

Music video
- "Origin of Love" on YouTube

Origin of Love is a song by British singer and songwriter Mika. It was released as the second single in the United Kingdom from his third studio album, The Origin of Love (2012). It was written by Mika, Nick Littlemore and Paul Steel, and produced by Nick Littlemore, Greg Wells and Mika. The single was released on British radio on 3 December 2012 and its music video was posted on 15 September 2012 on YouTube and Vimeo.

== Music video ==
The music video, sometimes referred to as "The Origin of Love" short film, was recorded in the streets of Santiago, Chile. It starred Chilean actors Daniela Ramírez and Jorge Arecheta. It was directed by Mika and Chilean director Cristián Jiménez, who provided a visual accompaniment to the title track. The music video for the original version of the track premiered on 15 September 2012. It included explicit scenes of a man and a woman engaging in sex while in a loving relationship. The video was shown on British music channels, but these scenes were edited out, replacing the original version of the track with the radio version. The video received very positive reviews from Sam Lansky, of Idolator, and Perez Hilton.

== Track listing ==
Standard edition

1. "Origin of Love" – 4:37

The Origin of Love Italian Deluxe Edition Bonus Disc

1. "Origin of Love" – 4:37
2. "Origin of Love" (Acoustic version) – 4:37
3. "Origin of Love" (Italian version) – 4:37

== Charts ==
Chart (2012–13)	Peak position
Belgium (Ultratip Bubbling Under Flanders)	16
Belgium (Ultratip Bubbling Under Wallonia)	4
France (SNEP)	136
South Korea International Songs (Gaon)	20
