= Celebrate (Mika song) =

Single by Mika featuring Pharrell Williams

from the album The Origin of Love
- Released: 15 June 2012
- Recorded: 2011
- Genre: Pop
- Length: 3:05
- Label: Barclay; Casablanca
- Songwriters: Michael Penniman; Pharrell Williams; Benjamin Garrett
- Producers: Fryars; Peter Mayes; Nick Littlemore

Mika singles chronology
"Elle me dit" (2011)	"Celebrate" (2012)	"Underwater" (2012)

Pharrell Williams singles chronology
"Here Ye, Hear Ye" (2011)	"Celebrate" (2012)	"Blurred Lines" (2013)

Music video
- "Celebrate" on YouTube

"Celebrate" is a song by British singer Mika featuring American musician Pharrell Williams. It was released as the lead single of the former's third studio album, The Origin of Love (2012), in the United Kingdom, Europe and America, and the second single in France. It was written by the artists alongside Fryars and produced by the latter, alongside Peter Mayes, and Nick Littlemore.

The song received generally favorable reviews from music critics. Some called it a "great summer song" and praised Pharrell for giving another dimension to Mika's vocals. However, some critics dismissed Mika's processed vocals and the song's rhythm. The song has charted on the French Singles Chart and on the Belgium Charts, but failed to chart on the UK Singles Chart.

== Background and release ==
After the release of "Elle me dit" in 2011, only in French-speaking countries, Mika unveiled a music video for the song "Make You Happy", which is not a single, but is included on The Origin of Love. Later, on 14 July 2012, Mika previewed a 30-second clip of the song. It was uploaded to Amazon ahead of its official unveiling and was later removed from the online store. The song was released on 15 June 2012.

== Composition ==
"Celebrate" (2012)
A 29 second sample of "Celebrate", a dance-pop song about celebrating life.

"Celebrate" was written by Mika, Pharrell Williams and Ben Garrett and produced by Peter Hayes and Nick Littlemore. Nick Littlemore of the Australian electorock outfit, Empire of the Sun, lends a hand on the production, which gives the song a retro synth-pop clubby feel. The song's message is clear—he simply wants the whole world to celebrate life.

== Critical reception ==
Emily Tam of Idolator wrote that "it shows that the Neptunes mastermind brings his smooth vocals, giving it another dimension." Ivan Ibarra of DJ Booth called it "a synth-heavy pop, yet head-nodding, sound that allows MIKA to blossom." Lanne Billings from "Paste Magazine" named it "an Elton John-ish spin on the eternal 'let’s party' single."

However, a negative review came from "Pop Dust"'s Katherine St Asaph, who gave the song 1 out of 5 stars, writing: "Pharrell doesn’t sound like Pharrell, Mika, meanwhile, swaddles his voice in so much processing he ends up sounding like Adam Levine if he were whispering. The whole thing ends up sounding like a subpar take of one of Adam Lambert's weaker Trespassing singles. It might be best for Mika and Pharrell to quietly bury 'Celebrate' in favor of a real comeback single. They both deserve better."

== Vegetable Orchestra version ==
Mika collaborated with the London Vegetable Orchestra and the Junk Orchestra and recorded a different version of the song at Sarm Studios in July 2012. This version features Mika's vocals accompanied only by instruments crafted from fresh vegetables (played by the London Vegetable Orchestra) and junk (played by the Junk Orchestra). The musical director was Oli Jackson. As of August 2012 this version has only been released online.

== Charts and certifications ==
=== Weekly charts ===
Chart (2012)	Peak position
Belgium (Ultratip Bubbling Under Flanders)	3
Belgium (Ultratop 50 Wallonia)	37
France (SNEP)	33
Japan (Japan Hot 100)	16
Italy (FIMI)	32
Netherlands (Dutch Top 40)	35
Netherlands (Single Top 100)	75
South Korea (Gaon International Chart)	9
Spain (Promusicae)	33
Spain Airplay (PROMUSICAE)	20
US Hot Dance Club Songs (Billboard)	21

=== Certifications ===
Region	Certification	Certified units/sales
Italy (FIMI)	Gold	15,000^{*}
^{*} Sales figures based on certification alone.
