= Brandon Frazier =

American pair skater (born 1992)

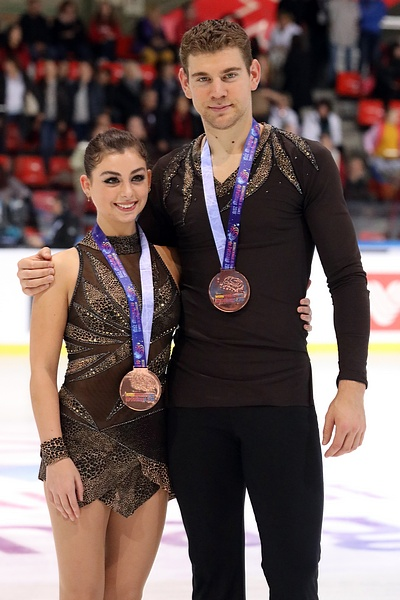
- Haven Denney and Brandon Frazier at the 2019 Internationaux de France

Personal information
- Full name: Brandon Michael Frazier
- Born: November 19, 1992 (age 33) Phoenix, Arizona, U.S
- Home town: Wesley Chapel, Florida, U.S
- Height: 6 ft 2 in (1.89 m)

Figure skating career
- Country: United States
- Discipline: Pair skating
- Partner: Alexa Knierim (2020–23); Haven Denney (2011–20); Mandy Garza (2010–11)
- Coach: Todd Sand; Jenni Meno; Chris Knierim
- Skating club: All Year Figure Skating Club, Los Angeles
- Began skating: 2005
- Retired: 2023

Medal record
Event	Gold medal – first place	Silver medal – second place	Bronze medal – third place
Olympic Games	1	0	0
World Championships	1	1	0
Grand Prix Final	0	1	0
U.S. Championships	3	2	0
World Team Trophy	1	1	0
World Junior Championships	1	0	0
Medal list
Olympic Games
Gold medal – first place	2022 Beijing	Team
World Championships
Gold medal – first place	2022 Montpellier	Pairs
Silver medal – second place	2023 Saitama	Pairs
Grand Prix Final
Silver medal – second place	2022-23 Turin	Pairs
U.S. Championships
Gold medal – first place	2017 Kansas City	Pairs
Gold medal – first place	2021 Las Vegas	Pairs
Gold medal – first place	2023 San Jose	Pairs
Silver medal – second place	2015 Greensboro	Pairs
Silver medal – second place	2019 Detroit	Pairs
World Team Trophy
Gold medal – first place	2023 Tokyo	Team
Silver medal – second place	2021 Osaka	Team
World Junior Championships
Gold medal – first place	2013 Milan	Pairs

Brandon Michael Frazier (born November 19, 1992) is an American former competitive pair skater. With his skating partner, Alexa Knierim, he is the 2022 World champion, the 2023 World silver medalist, a 2022 Olympic gold medalist in the figure skating team event, the 2022 Grand Prix Final silver medalist, a two-time U.S. National champion (2021, 2023), and a three-time Grand Prix gold medalist.

With his former partner, Haven Denney, he is a four-time Grand Prix medalist (2 silver, 2 bronze), the 2013 World Junior champion, and the 2017 U.S. National champion.

== Personal life ==
Brandon Frazier was born in Phoenix, Arizona. He competed as a roller skater from 1998 until 2004.

== Career ==
=== Early career ===
Brandon Frazier and Haven Denney first teamed up in 2002 as roller skaters before switching to the ice. As figure skaters, they competed together for three seasons from 2005 to 2008, coached by Jim Peterson and Lyndon Johnston. After two seasons on the juvenile level, the pair moved up a level and won the 2008 U.S. intermediate bronze medal. The skaters decided to part ways with their families living in different states.

Skating with Mandy Garza, Frazier was 8th at a 2010–11 ISU Junior Grand Prix event in Austria and 5th on the junior level at the 2011 U.S. Championships. Garza and Frazier announced the end of their partnership in February 2011.

=== 2011–2012 season: Junior Grand Prix debut ===
Denney/Frazier teamed up for the second time in the spring of 2011. They competed on the Junior Grand Prix series, placing 8th in Latvia and 7th in Austria. They won the junior title at the 2012 U.S. Championships and were assigned to the 2012 World Junior Championships, where they placed 4th. The pair was coached by Dalilah Sappenfield in Colorado Springs, Colorado until the fall of 2012 when they moved to Coral Springs, Florida to train with John Zimmerman and Silvia Fontana at Coral Gables.

=== 2012–2013 season: World Junior title ===
Denney/Frazier finished 4th at the Junior Grand Prix event held in Lake Placid, New York. They placed fifth at the 2013 U.S. Championships in January. In March, they won the gold medal at the 2013 World Junior Championships, the first American pair to win the title since 2007.

=== 2013–2014 season: Grand Prix debut ===
Denney/Frazier placed fifth at both their Grand Prix events, 2013 Skate Canada International and 2013 NHK Trophy. In January, they placed fifth at the 2014 U.S. Championships. A short time after, they placed fourth at the 2014 Four Continents Championships.

=== 2014–2015 season: First senior medals ===
Denney/Frazier won medals at two Challenger Series events – gold at the 2014 CS Lombardia Trophy and silver at the 2014 CS Skate Canada Autumn Classic. In the Grand Prix series, they won their first Grand Prix medal, silver, at 2014 Skate America and then finished fourth at the 2014 Rostelecom Cup. In January, Denney/Frazier won the silver medal at the 2015 U.S. Championships. After Nationals, they began training full-time under Ingo Steuer. They finished 7th at the 2015 Four Continents Championships and 12th at the 2015 World Championships.

In April 2015, Denney/Frazier changed their training location from Coral Springs, Florida to West Palm Beach, Florida. Soon after, on April 22, Denney sustained a knee injury while practicing a throw double flip off the ice. She said, "When I landed, my foot stayed, and my body kept rotating," and she then heard "a couple of loud pops". Having torn the anterior cruciate ligament, lateral collateral ligament, and bilateral and lateral meniscus in her right knee, she underwent surgery on April 28 at the Steadman Clinic in Vail, Colorado.

=== 2015–2016 season ===
Denney put no weight on her right leg for six weeks and then began physical therapy before returning to the ice in October 2015. During this time, Frazier worked on his skating skills under Marina Zueva and her team in Canton, Michigan. In October, the pair started training at the Olympic Training Center in Colorado Springs. Initially limited to basic stroking and crossovers, Denney began cautiously practicing jumps in late November.

Denney/Frazier did not compete in the 2015–16 season. By April 2016, they were training with Rockne Brubaker and Stefania Berton at the Fox Valley Ice Center in Geneva, Illinois.

=== 2016–2017 season: First national title ===
Denney/Frazier returned to competition, beginning at the 2016 CS Ondrej Nepela Memorial, where they placed fourth. They were assigned to two Grand Prix events, 2016 Skate America and 2016 Skate Canada International. They won the silver medal at Skate America and then placed fourth at Skate Canada. They competed at a second Challenger event, the 2017 CS Golden Spin of Zagreb, where they placed fourth.

At the 2017 U.S. Championships, Denney/Frazier won their first national title. Denney commented, "I'm just so proud of where we are right now. We've worked so hard through our ups and downs and everything. I'm just very appreciative and blessed to be here." They were assigned to the 2017 Four Continents Championships, where they finished eighth, and the 2017 World Championships, where they placed twentieth in the short program and did not qualify for the free skate.

=== 2017–2018 season ===
Denney/Frazier began the season at the 2017 U.S. Classic, where they placed fifth. They placed seventh at both of their Grand Prix events, 2017 Skate America and 2017 Skate Canada International.

At the 2018 U.S. Championships, Denney/Frazier placed fifth. They were not selected for the 2018 Winter Olympics or any ISU Championship events. In spring 2018, the pair decided to rejoin the coaching team of John Zimmerman and Silvia Fontana, who were based in Wesley Chapel, Florida.

=== 2018–2019 season ===
Denney developed a stress fracture in her ankle early in the summer. Denney/Frazier won the bronze medal at their Challenger event to start the season, the 2018 CS Autumn Classic International. They placed sixth at 2018 Skate Canada International but had to withdraw from their second Grand Prix event, the 2018 Internationaux de France because Denney's stress fracture had become too painful for her to skate.

At the 2019 U.S. Championships, Denney/Frazier won the silver medal, placing third in the short program and second in the free skate, making some errors on their jumps in the latter. Frazier remarked, "There were some things we left out on the table, and that's what we are going to shoot for, to get better." At the 2019 Four Continents Championships, their final event of the season, they finished in fifth place. Side-by-side jump errors continued to plague them, which Denney said would be a focus for improvement in the off-season.

=== 2019–2020 season: End of partnership ===
For the new season, Denney/Frazier revived their acclaimed The Lion King free skate from the 2014–2015 season. After placing sixth at the 2019 CS Nebelhorn Trophy, they won the bronze medal at 2019 Skate America, defeating reigning US national champions Cain-Gribble/LeDuc. At their second Grand Prix event, the 2019 Internationaux de France, they won the bronze medal. They placed third in the short program, with Denney underrotating their triple Salchow jump. She landed a clean triple Salchow in the free skate, though they botched their intended three-jump combination, and they placed second in that segment to finish third overall. They again placed ahead of Cain-Gribble/LeDuc.

Denney/Frazier struggled at the 2020 U.S. Championships, beginning in the short program where Denney fell on their throw and then popped their planned triple jump, resulting in them finishing sixth in that segment. After further side-by-side jump errors and another throw fall in the free skate, they placed fifth overall.

On March 25, Denney/Frazier announced that they had ended their partnership.

=== 2020–2021 season: New partnership, first Grand Prix title, and second national title ===
On April 1, Frazier announced that he was teaming up with Alexa Knierim, whose husband and former partner Chris Knierim had opted to retire. The new pair started skating together in May 2020 due to restrictions caused by the COVID-19 pandemic. They began training in Irvine, California, at Great Park Ice, with coaches Todd Sand, Jenni Meno, Rafael Arutunian, Chris Knierim, and Christine Binder. They also took lessons remotely from coach Nina Mozer.

Knierim/Frazier won the gold medal in their Grand Prix debut at 2020 Skate America, which also marked their competitive debut as a pair. This event was attended by skaters training in the United States due to travel restrictions caused by the COVID-19 pandemic. The pair skated strongly and solidly in both programs, placing 1st in the short program with a score of 74.19 and 1st the free skate with a score of 140.58, for a total of 214.77 to earn their first Grand Prix title.

At the 2021 U.S. Championships in January, Knierim/Frazier won their first national title together with a score of 228.10, the highest score ever achieved in U.S. competition. They placed 1st in the short program with a score of 77.46 and 1st in the free skate with a score of 150.64, setting new U.S. Championship records in both segments. They won the gold medal by a dominant 23-point margin with two strong and well-executed programs. Frazier is the first male U.S. pair skater to win national titles with two different partners since 2012.

At the 2021 World Championships in March, Knierim/Frazier placed 7th in their Worlds debut. They skated well enough to finish 7th in both segments of the competition, despite Frazier doubling his planned triple jump in the short program and the pair counting multiple errors in the free skate. This was the best result by a U.S. pair since 2015 when Knierim achieved the same placement with her former partner.

In April, Knierim/Frazier competed at the 2021 World Team Trophy and helped Team USA win the silver medal. They placed second among the pairs after finishing fourth in the short program and second in the free skate. Their free skate score was the highest score a U.S. pair has ever received from an international judging panel under the current judging system.

=== 2021–2022 season: Beijing Olympics and World Champions ===
Knierim/Frazier skated strongly at the Cranberry Cup International, where they won the silver medal behind Russian pair Evgenia Tarasova and Vladimir Morozov. Their total score of 205.87 was a new international personal best. In September, they won the gold medal at the John Nicks Pairs Challenge, an ISU international competition in New York City. They placed 1st in both segments of the competition with two strong programs and earned all new personal best scores. Their total score of 212.55 was the highest score a U.S. pair has ever achieved under an international judging panel.

In their first Grand Prix event of the season, 2021 Skate America, Knierim/Frazier placed fourth and narrowly missed the podium, just 2.56 points behind reigning World bronze medalists Boikova/Kozlovskii. They were fifth in the short program after Frazier fell out of his triple jump. They placed second in the free skate with a strong performance, earning a new personal best score and surpassing their own record for the highest score a U.S. pair has ever earned under the current international judging system. At their second Grand Prix event, the 2021 Internationaux de France, the pair won the bronze medal. They were narrowly fourth in the short program, 1.69 points behind Canadians James/Radford, and then delivered a strong free skate to overtake the Canadians and place third in that segment just 0.59 points behind the second place Russian pair. They then competed at a Challenger event, 2021 Golden Spin of Zagreb, where they placed second in the short program, just 0.51 out of first place. After an uncharacteristically shaky free skate, they finished fifth overall.

Knierim/Frazier entered the 2022 U.S. Championships as the favorites to win and repeat as national champions. They had been the U.S. pair with the best results, the highest scores, and the most consistent scoring ability across an extended period leading into Nationals. After arriving at the competition, Frazier began to feel unwell, and he tested positive for COVID-19 on January 5, the day before the short program. The pair was forced to withdraw from the competition, and Frazier shared an emotional video message in which he expressed his devastation over not being able to compete. As the leading U.S. pair, Knierim/Frazier successfully petitioned and earned an Olympic spot. On January 9, they were named to the 2022 U.S. Olympic team and the 2022 World team, and Frazier stated he felt "100 percent back to normal." Knierim added, "I am super honored and grateful to be named to the team with Brandon. I believe the best is yet to come. We were so ready and prepared to compete here this week, it was devastating for us, but obviously, right now, we're on cloud nine." This was to be Frazier's first Olympic appearance, while Knierim became the first U.S. pair skater to make two Olympic teams in 20 years.

At the 2022 Winter Olympics in February, Knierim/Frazier were the American pair entry in the figure skating team event and helped the U.S. team win the silver medal. They placed a strong third in the short program segment with a clean skate and earned a new personal best score of 75.00 points. They then finished fifth in the free skate segment. In the pair event, Knierim/Frazier placed sixth, which was the best result by a U.S. pair in 20 years. They skated a clean short program and were in sixth place after that segment. In the free skate, they delivered another strong program and earned a new personal best score of 138.45 and a new personal best total score of 212.68. These scores surpassed their own records for the highest scores ever achieved by a U.S. pair under the international judging system. Frazier called the experience a "true dream come true."

In March, Knierim/Frazier won the gold medal at the 2022 World Championships in Montpellier, France. Russian skaters were banned from competing by the International Skating Union due to their country's invasion of Ukraine, and the Chinese Skating Association also did not send athletes to compete. As those countries' athletes comprised the entirety of the top five pairs at the Olympics, this had a big impact on the field for Worlds, and Knierim/Frazier entered the event as medal favorites. After skating strongly in both the short program and the free skate, the pair won their first world title by a 22-point margin with a personal best score of 221.09. They won the short program with a personal best score of 76.88. They won the free skate with another new personal best of 144.21. All of their scores set new records for the highest scores ever achieved by a U.S. pair internationally. Knierim/Frazier became the first American World champions in pairs since Babilonia/Gardner in 1979. Frazier said, "We couldn't have asked for a better ending of the season."

=== 2022–2023 season: Second World medal and third national title ===
Knierim/Frazier began their season in October at 2022 Skate America, where they won the gold medal, their first Grand Prix title in a full-fledged Grand Prix event. They skated a solid short program to place first in that segment and went on to place first in the free skate as well. Frazier, speaking after the free skate, noted that it was their first event of the season and that "tonight was a fight, so a lot of grit out there." Knierim/Frazier became the first U.S. pair since 2006 and the third U.S. pair in history to win a Grand Prix title.

Knierim/Frazier won the gold medal at their second Grand Prix event, 2022 MK John Wilson Trophy, by a dominant 21.66-point margin. They earned all-new season's best scores and won both segments of the competition with a strong short program and some errors in the free skate. Knierim/Frazier became the first U.S. pair to win two Grand Prix events in one season, and the first U.S. pair to qualify to the Grand Prix Final since 2015 when Knierim qualified with her former partner.

At the 2022 Grand Prix Final, Knierim/Frazier won the silver medal, narrowly missing the gold medal by just one point. They entered the event as co-favorites for the title alongside the top-seeded Miura/Kihara of Japan. In the short program, they skated cleanly except for a hand down by Frazier on their side-by-side jump, and earned a new personal best score of 77.65 to place second, only 0.43 points behind Miura/Kihara. They followed it up in the free skate with another strong performance with two shaky jumps and earned new season's best free skate and total scores. They were narrowly outscored in that segment, just 0.87 behind Miura/Kihara's skate which contained errors. Knierim/Frazier became the first U.S. pair in history to win a Grand Prix Final medal. Their total score was the second highest ever by a U.S. pair in international competition, behind only their score from the World Championships the previous season.

At the 2023 U.S. Championships, Knierim/Frazier won their second national title by a dominant 31.11 points, the largest margin of victory in history, which surpassed their own previous record set in 2021. They skated a clean short program and led the competition by a commanding 15.1 point margin. Their short program score of 81.96 set a new record for the highest score ever earned at the U.S. Championships. They went on to place first in the free skate as well with a strong performance en route to the gold medal. This was Frazier's third national title overall and Knierim's fifth national title overall, tying her with five other skaters for the most U.S. titles by a pair skater in the past 75 years. Knierim/Frazier declined assignment to the 2023 Four Continents Championships, opting instead to participate in Art on Ice shows in Switzerland.

The leadup to the 2023 World Championships was a difficult time for the team, after their coach Todd Sand had a heart attack on March 2 and was hospitalized for an extended period. Competing in Saitama, Japan, Knierim/Frazier won the silver medal, their second consecutive world medal. They placed second in the short program after Frazier fell on his triple toe loop, but had an otherwise strong skate. They won the free skate with a strong performance despite both making jump errors, but remained second overall, 4.68 points behind Miura/Kihara. Their free skate score of 142.84 and total score of 217.48 were their season's best scores, as well as the second highest scores ever achieved by a U.S. pair, behind only their scores from the previous World Championships. Knierim/Frazier became the first U.S. pair to medal in consecutive World Championships since their coaches Jenni Meno and Todd Sand did so in 1995 and 1996. Knierim/Frazier became just the seventh U.S. pair in history to win multiple World medals. Afterwards Knierim stated, "This whole week, this whole time, this program, it was all for our coach. That's what our hearts are."

At the 2023 World Team Trophy in April, Knierim/Frazier helped Team USA win the gold medal by a dominant margin. They placed first among the pairs, winning both segments of the competition over Miura/Kihara of Team Japan. They skated a clean short program and earned a new personal best score of 82.25. In the free skate, they skated a very strong program aside from a fall on their triple salchow and earned a new personal best score of 147.87. These scores, as well as their new personal best total score of 230.12, surpassed their own records for highest scores ever achieved by a U.S. pair team.

== Post-competitive career ==
Following the 2022–23 figure skating season, Knierim/Frazier left competitive skating for the foreseeable future. In addition to pursuing his education, Frazier began working as a coach at Great Park Ice alongside former coaches, Jenni Meno and Todd Sand.

During the 2024 Paris Olympics, a medal ceremony was held for Knierim/Frazier and their teammates from the 2022 Olympic Figure Skating Team Event, where they were awarded their newly allocated Olympic team gold medals.

== Programs ==
=== With Knierim ===
Season	Short program	Free skating	Exhibition
2022–2023	Separate Ways (Worlds Apart) by Journey Remixed by Bryce Miller, Alloy Tracks (from Stranger Things) choreo. by Shae-Lynn Bourne	Sign of the Times by Harry Styles choreo. by John Kerr and Sinead Kerr	Shallow by Lady Gaga & Bradley Cooper; Fix You by Coldplay choreo. by Renée Roca
2021–2022	The House of the Rising Sun by Heavy Young Heathens choreo. by Shae-Lynn Bourne	Fix You by Coldplay & Fearless Soul choreo. by Renée Roca	Tore My Heart by Oona Garthwaite; Shallow by Lady Gaga & Bradley Cooper
2020–2021	In the End by Linkin Park performed by Tommee Profitt; Too Far Gone by Hidden Citizens	Fall on Me by Andrea Bocelli & Matteo Bocelli	

=== With Denney ===
Season	Short program	Free skating	Exhibition
2019–2020	Quidam (from Cirque du Soleil) by Benoît Jutras choreo. by Renée Roca	The Lion King by Hans Zimmer choreo. by Renée Roca	
2018–2019	Billie Jean performed by David Cook	Irrepressibles selection	
2017–2018	All Of Me by John Legend	Who Wants to Live Forever by Queen, David Garrett	
2016–2017	Don Juan choreo. by Marina Zueva	Somewhere in Time by John Barry choreo. by Marina Zueva	Oh! Darling by The Beatles
2014–2015	The Godfather by Nino Rota choreo. by John Zimmerman, Silvia Fontana	The Lion King by Hans Zimmer choreo. by Renée Roca	One by U2
2013–2014	Malagueña by Ernesto Lecuona	Notre-Dame de Paris by Riccardo Cocciante choreo. by Julie Marcotte	
2012–2013	Malagueña by Ernesto Lecuona	La Strada by Nino Rota choreo. by Julie Marcotte	Due respiri by Eros Ramazzotti performed by Chiara
2011–2012	Chicago	Pearl Harbor by Hans Zimmer	All That Jazz (from Chicago) by John Kander, Fred Ebb

=== With Garza ===
Season	Short program	Free skating
2010–11	Don't Let Me Be Misunderstood by Santa Esmeralda	James Bond medley
2009–10	The Incredibles by Michael Giacchino	Sing, Sing, Sing by Louis Prima

== Competitive highlights ==
- GP – Event of the ISU Grand Prix Series
- JGP – Event of the ISU Junior Grand Prix Series
- CS – Event of the ISU Challenger Series
- WD – Withdrew from competition
- Medals at team events are awarded for the team results only. Individual placements at team events are listed in parentheses.

=== Pair skating with Alexa Knierim ===
Competition placements at senior level
Season	2020–21	2021–22	2022–23
Winter Olympics		6th	
Winter Olympics (Team event)		1st	
World Championships	7th	1st	2nd
Grand Prix Final			2nd
U.S. Championships	1st		1st
World Team Trophy	2nd (2nd)		1st (1st)
GP France		3rd	
GP Skate America	1st	4th	1st
GP Wilson Trophy			1st
CS Golden Spin of Zagreb		5th	
Cranberry Cup		2nd	
John Nicks Challenge		1st	

=== Pair skating with Haven Denney ===
Competition placements at senior level
Season	2012–13	2013–14	2014–15	2016–17	2017–18	2018–19	2019–20
World Championships			12th	20th			
Four Continents Championships		4th	7th	8th		5th	
U.S. Championships	5th	5th	2nd	1st	5th	2nd	5th
GP France						WD	3rd
GP NHK Trophy		5th					
GP Rostelecom Cup			4th				
GP Skate America			2nd	2nd	7th		3rd
GP Skate Canada		5th		4th	7th	6th	
CS Autumn Classic			2nd			3rd	
CS Golden Spin of Zagreb				4th			
CS Lombardia Trophy			1st				
CS Nebelhorn Trophy							6th
CS Nepela Memorial		4th		4th			
CS U.S. Classic					4th		

Competition placements at junior level
Season	2011–12	2012–13
World Junior Championships	4th	1st
U.S. Championships	1st	
JGP Austria	7th	
JGP Latvia	8th	
JGP United States		4th

=== Pair skating with Mandy Garza ===
Competition placements at junior level
Season	2010–11
U.S. Championships	5th
JGP Austria	8th

== Detailed results ==
- Small medals for the short program and free skating are only awarded at ISU Championships.
- Medals at team events are awarded for the team results only. Individual placements at team events are listed in parentheses.

=== Pair skating with Alexa Knierim ===
ISU personal best scores in the +5/-5 GOE System
Segment	Type	Score	Event
Total	TSS	230.12	2023 World Team Trophy
Short program	TSS	82.25	2023 World Team Trophy
Short program	TES	45.38	2023 World Team Trophy
Short program	PCS	36.87	2023 World Team Trophy
Free skating	TSS	147.87	2023 World Team Trophy
Free skating	TES	74.71	2023 World Team Trophy
Free skating	PCS	74.16	2023 World Team Trophy

Results in the 2020–21 season
Date	Event	SP		FS		Total	
Date	Event	P	Score	P	Score	P	Score
Oct 25–27, 2020	(United States) 2020 Skate America	1	74.19	1	140.58	1	214.77
Jan 11–21, 2021	(United States) 2021 U.S. Championships	1	77.46	1	150.64	1	228.10
Mar 22–28, 2021	(Sweden) 2021 World Championships	7	64.67	7	127.43	7	192.10
Apr 15–18, 2021	(Japan) 2021 World Team Trophy	4	65.68	2	133.63	2 (2)	199.31

Results in the 2021–22 season
Date	Event	SP		FS		Total	
Date	Event	P	Score	P	Score	P	Score
Aug 11–15, 2021	(United States) 2021 Cranberry Cup International	2	69.83	2	136.04	2	205.87
Sep 9–10, 2021	(United States) 2021 John Nicks Pairs Challenge	1	76.09	1	136.46	1	212.55
Oct 22–24, 2021	(United States) 2021 Skate America	5	66.37	2	136.60	4	202.97
Nov 19–21, 2021	2021 Internationaux de France	4	70.15	3	131.54	3	201.69
Dec 9–11, 2021	(Croatia) 2021 CS Golden Spin of Zagreb	2	66.44	5	120.25	5	186.69
Feb 4–7, 2022	(China) 2022 Winter Olympics (Team event)	3	75.00	5	128.97	1	–
Feb 18–19, 2022	(China) 2022 Winter Olympics	6	74.23	7	138.45	6	212.68
Mar 21–27, 2022	(France) 2022 World Championships	1	76.88	1	144.21	1	221.09

Results in the 2022–23 season
Date	Event	SP		FS		Total	
Date	Event	P	Score	P	Score	P	Score
Oct 21–23, 2022	(United States) 2022 Skate America	1	75.19	1	126.20	1	201.39
Nov 11–13, 2022	(United Kingdom) 2022 MK John Wilson Trophy	1	75.88	1	129.97	1	205.85
Dec 8–11, 2022	(Italy) 2022–23 Grand Prix Final	2	77.65	2	135.63	2	213.28
Jan 23–29, 2022	(United States) 2023 U.S. Championships	1	81.96	1	146.01	1	227.97
Mar 22–26, 2023	(Japan) 2023 World Championships	2	74.64	1	142.84	2	217.48
Apr 13–16, 2023	(Japan) 2023 World Team Trophy	1	82.25	1	147.87	1 (1)	230.12
