= Stardust (Mika song) =

2012 song by Mika

Song by Mika

from the album The Origin of Love
- Released: 2012
- Recorded: 2012
- Length: 3:18
- Songwriters: Mika; Wayne Hector; Alessandro Benassi; Marco "Benny" Benassi
- Producers: Benny Benassi; Greg Wells

"Stardust"

Single by Mika featuring Chiara

from the album Songbook Vol. 1
- Released: 7 November 2013 (airplay); 12 November 2013 (digital download)
- Recorded: 2012–2013
- Genre: Pop
- Length: 4:10
- Label: Island
- Songwriters: Mika; Wayne Hector; Alessandro Benassi; Marco "Benny" Benassi
- Producer: Benny Benassi

Mika singles chronology
| "Live Your Life" (2013) | "Stardust" (2013) | "Boum Boum Boum" (2014) |

Chiara singles chronology
| "Vieni con me" (2013) | "Stardust" (2013) | "Un giorno di sole" (2014) |

Audio
- "Stardust" on YouTube

"Stardust" is a solo song by Mika in English that first appeared in his 2012 album The Origin of Love. It was produced by Benny Benassi and Greg Wells.

The Deluxe Edition Bonus Disc of the album contained a bonus mix version titled "Stardust (Benny Benassi Mix)". It was produced by Benny Benassi, Alessandro "Alle" Benassi and Nick Littlemore. The Italian Deluxe Edition Bonus Disc for the album included yet a third track "Stardust (Italian version)".

== Italian version featuring Chiara ==
A second bilingual version of the song in English and Italian featuring Italian singer Chiara (full name Chiara Galiazzo) was a huge success in Italy. Chiara was the eventual winner in the sixth season of the Italian talent show X Factor. Mika and Chiara performed it live during the Final 4 stage emission of the Italian The X Factor on 7 December 2012.

The song became a number one single in the country for him for five non-consecutive weeks in November and December 2013. It was certified 4 times platinum in Italy.

The song credited to Mika e Chiara was included in Songbook Vol. 1 (full title Songbook Vol. 1 - I più grandi successi) Mika's first greatest hits compilation released in Italy. The version of "Stardust" and "Live Your Life" are exclusive to this release. The album was released on 18 November 2013 in Italy, following Mika's appointment as a judge for season 7 of the Italian version of The X Factor.

== Chart positions ==
Weekly charts
| Chart (2013–14) | Peak |
|---|---|
| Italy (FIMI) | 1 |

2013 annual chart rankings
| Chart (2013) | Rank |
|---|---|
| Italy (FIMI) | 17 |

2014 annual chart rankings
| Chart (2014) | Rank |
|---|---|
| Italy (FIMI) | 39 |

=== Certifications ===
Certifications and sales for "Stardust"
| Region | Certification | Certified units/sales |
|---|---|---|
| Italy (FIMI) | 4× Platinum | 120,000^{*} |
^{*} Sales figures based on certification alone.
