= Alessandro Cecchi Paone =

Italian television presenter, journalist, and politician (born 1961)

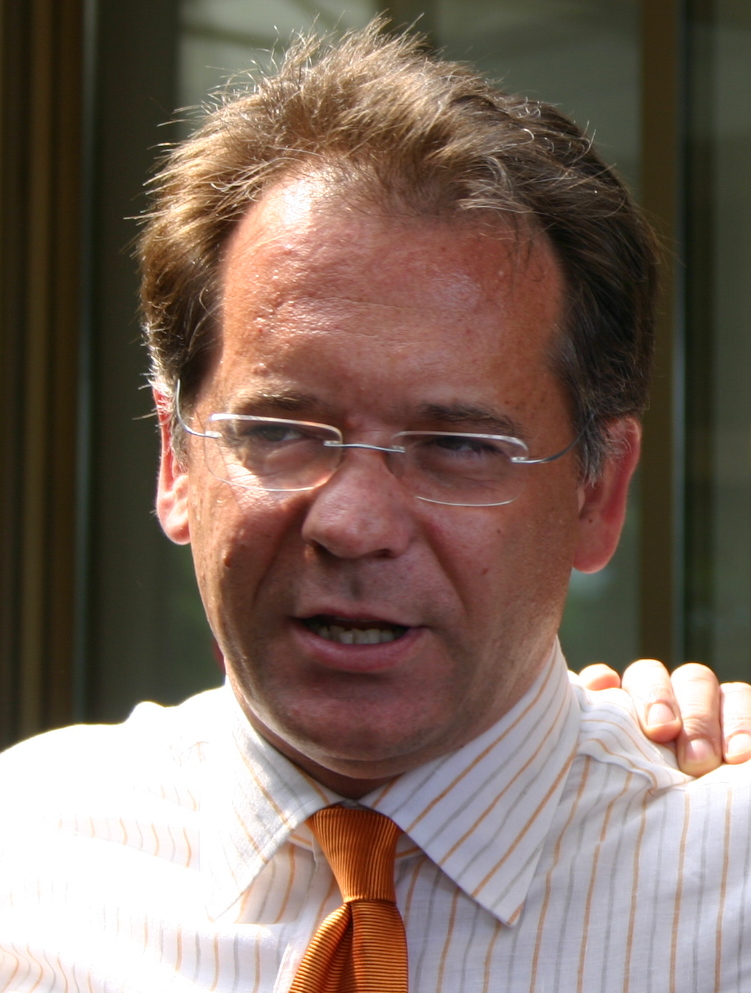
- Cecchi Paone in 2007
- Born: Alessandro Cecchi Paone; 16 November 1961 (age 64); Rome, Italy
- Education: Sapienza University of Rome
- Occupations: Presenter, journalist, university professor
- Political party: None
- Other political affiliations: PRI (2009–2014); FI (2014)
- Spouse: Cristina Navarro (div. 2004)

Alessandro Cecchi Paone (born 16 September 1961) is an Italian television presenter, journalist, radio and television writer, and politician.

== Early life and education. ==
Born in Rome, Cecchi Paone graduated in Political Science at the Sapienza University of Rome. He started his television career while still a teenager, hosting from 1977 to 1980 the RAI program Trenta minuti giovani.

== Career ==
In the 1980s, Cecchi Paone collaborated as writer to several Rai Radio 3 journalistic and cultural programmes and to several documentaries and hosted several shows. In 1991, he became a newscaster of TG5, and after a few months also of TG2. For a few years, he was a popular personality of Rai 2, where he hosted some successful shows such as In famiglia and La cronaca in diretta. In 1996, Cecchi Paone returned to Mediaset, where in 1997 he launched his most successful work, the science TV show La Macchina del Tempo, which lasted until 2006 and also generated a satellite thematic channel, MT Channel. In 2016, he hosted the daily newscast TG4.

During his career, Paone took part in several reality shows, notably three editions of L'isola dei famosi and the third season of Grande Fratello VIP. A member of the Italian Republican Party (PRI), Cecchi Paone ran in the 2004 and 2014 European Parliament elections with Forza Italia but was not elected. On 29 April 2021, he was appointed advisor to the 7th Commission of Culture on Digital Citizenship in the Senate of the Republic.

== Personal life ==
Cecchi Paone was married to Cristina Navarro, to whom he later divorced. In 2004, he came out as a homosexual. In 2023, Cecchi Paone expressed his desire for same-sex adoption, which is not legal in Italy, with his partner Simone Antolini, a legal sciences student 38 years his junior.
