= Nella Rojas =

Venezuelan singer (born 1989)

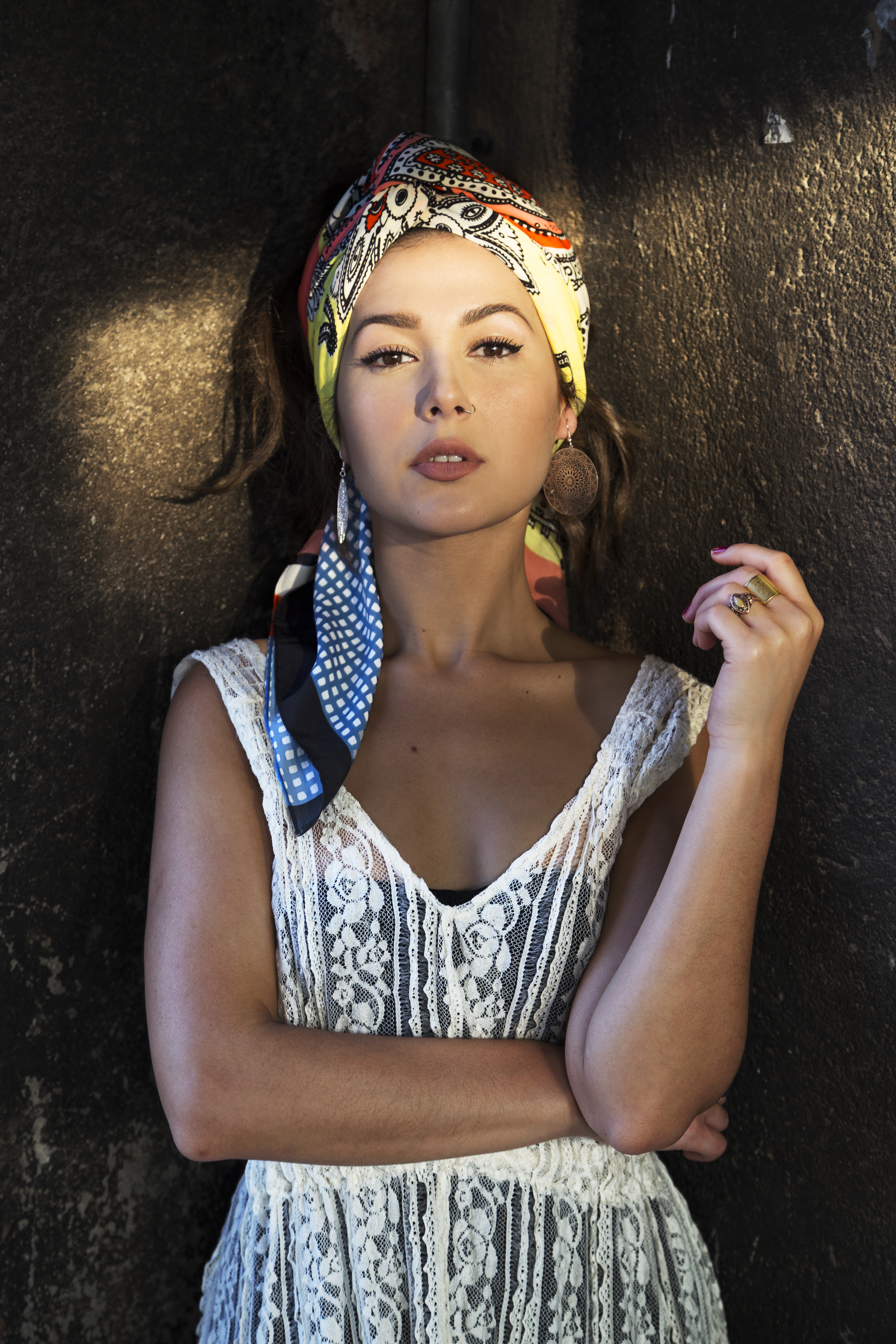
- Rojas in 2017
- Born: November 3, 1989 (age 36); Isla de Margarita, Venezuela
- Occupation: Singer

Marianella Rojas (born November 3, 1989), known as Nella, is a Venezuelan singer, originally from Porlamar, Margarita Island, Venezuela.

Rojas graduated from Berklee College of Music, and won a Latin Grammy Award for Best New Artist in 2019. The single "Voy" from her first album, created in collaboration with Javier Limón, was chosen among the best 54 songs of 2019 by New York Times. She was a special guest in Alejandro Sanz’ last tour in the United States in 2019, and was invited by the conductor Gustavo Dudamel to perform a song composed by him in the documentary "Free Color" from the artist Cruz Diez. She has also collaborated with artists such as Jennifer Lopez, Carlos Vives, Luis Enrique, Susana Baca, Los Amigos Invisibles, Monsieur Periné, Caramelos de Cianuro, Pedro Capó, and Yendry. In early 2020, she was signed by the record label Sony Music Latin and released her second studio album Doce margaritas in 2021.

== Musical career ==
She emigrated from her home island to Caracas, Canada and the United States to get a musical education. She graduated from Berklee College of Music, where she met the composer, musician, and music producer Javier Limon. As an admirer of the singer Buika, she also began to perform Andalusian music.

In 2018, she was invited to sing and act in the movie Everybody Knows from the Oscar-winning Iranian director, Asghar Farhadi, alongside Javier Bardem, Ricardo Darín and Penélope Cruz, where she performed several songs specially composed by Limon. Her voice was also heard in the Cannes Festival since the film was chosen for the event opening.

The following year she held the Me Llaman Nella World Tour, where she offered a new set that included music from the film Everybody Knows and Venezuelan folk songs. Her tour took her to stages in Venezuela, Panama, Mexico, the United States, Spain, and England.

=== Album "Voy" debut and international recognition ===
In 2019, she performed at the Latin Grammy Award ceremony along with Alejandro Sanz, Greecy and Aitana, where she later won the category Best New Artist.

In May of the same year, Nella made her first record "Voy," an album with compositions and production by Javier Limon for Casa Limón Records and worldwide distributed by The Orchard. Her debut album has been internationally recognized and her first single, "Voy", was chosen among the best 54 songs of 2019 by The New York Times. Months later, she performed during the Hispanic Heritage Month celebration in 2019, at the John F. Kennedy Center for the Performing Arts in Washington D.C., where she made a tribute dedicated to the strength of the Venezuelan people.

In 2019, she was a special guest of the singer Alejandro Sanz during his last tour in the United States, which took place in the American Airlines Arena in Miami and in the Microsoft Theater in Los Angeles. That same year she was invited by the conductor Gustavo Dudamel to perform a song composed by him for the documentary film Free Color by the artist Cruz Diez, directed by Beto Arvelo, and with the actor Edgard Ramirez as the narrator.

=== "Doce Margaritas" and "En Otra Vida" ===
In March 2020, Nella signed with Sony Music Latin. She released her second album, Doce Margaritas, in 2021. It features guest vocals from Pedro Capó and C4 Trío.

She released a cover of the Omara Portuondo song "Cien Años" in April 2024, a collaboration with Dominican singer Yendry. The track served as the lead single from her third studio album, En Otra Vida, released a month later in May 2024. It consists of ten covers, including Con los Años Que Me Quedan by Gloria Estefan, Me Voy by Julieta Venegas, and Te Espero Sentada by Shakira. In addition to Yendry, Nella collaborates with Paula Arenas, GALE, maye, and Nicole Zignago.

== Musical style ==
Her music brings together the folklore of her native land, with contemporary sounds and a strong influence of Andalusian music, sung with a personal and expressive vocal style.

== Discography ==
- 2019: Voy (IMG/Javier Limón Records).
- 2021: Doce margaritas (Sony Music Latin)
- 2024: En Otra Vida

== Awards ==
- 2019: "Mejor Artista Nuevo" at the Latin Grammy Awards.
