= Yendry =

Dominican singer-songwriter (born 1993)

YEИDRY
- Also known as: Yendry Fiorentino
- Born: Yendry Cony Fiorentino; July 27, 1993 (age 33); Santo Domingo, Dominican Republic
- Genres: Latin pop; Urbano; Latin R&B; electro
- Occupations: Singer; songwriter; model
- Instruments: Vocals; piano; guitars
- Years active: 2012–present
- Labels: Sony Music Italy (2012-2014); Sony Music Latin (2020-present); RCA Records (2020-2023)
- Website: yendrymusic.com

Yendry Cony Fiorentino (born 27 July 1993) known mononymously as Yendry (stylized as YEИDRY) is a Dominican-Italian singer and songwriter. Yendry first achieved popularity in Italy in 2012 thanks to her participation in the sixth edition of X Factor Italy which earned her a record deal with Sony Music Italy. From 2015 to 2018 she was the frontwoman of the group Materianera. In 2020 after the release of the singles Barrio and Nena she achieved international popularity and she signed a double record deal contract with RCA Records and Sony Music Latin. On April 15, 2021, she was one of the performers for the Latin American Music Awards of 2021. On June 7, 2021, she was nominated as Best New Artist at the 2021 MTV Millennial Awards. On January 25, 2022, she received the nomination as Best New Female artist for the 2022 Premio Lo Nuestro.

== Early life ==
Yendry was born in Santo Domingo, Dominican Republic, to a single mother, Rosa Maria Polanco. She grew up in Herrera, one of the poorest neighborhoods in the municipality of Santo Domingo Oeste. She lived in Herrera with her mother and grandmother until the age of three. Yendry and her mother then migrated to the city of Turin in Italy for economic reasons. A few years later her mother got married and started a new family. Yendry’s stepfather adopted her and she grew up with brothers from her mother's second marriage. She began to discover her love for music during liceo linguistico, a type of Italian secondary school that focuses on language learning and humanities. She started to attend singing class alongside a modeling career that led her to participate in the regional selections of Miss Italia and later to win the title of Miss Deborah Piemonte in 2012. She participated in the auditions of the sixth edition of X Factor in 2012. She passed the selections and became part of the program; while she didn't reach the semi-final, she signed a record deal with Sony Music Italy that she ended in 2014. From 2015 to 2018 she was the voice of the group Materianera. In 2018 she moved to London to work on her project as a solo artist in Spanish which led her to sign a double recording contract with Sony Music Latin and RCA Records. She has lived in Miami since 2020.

== Career ==
=== 2012–2014: X Factor Italia, Sony Music Italy record deal ===
In the summer of 2012, at a friend's suggestion, she auditioned for the sixth edition of X Factor Italia, performing Video Games by Lana Del Rey and she gained the four yeses of the judges. After successfully passing the bootcamp stages and the home visit stage she became an official contestant of the program for the category Under 24 Women led by Elio. Despite being eliminated by televoting in the fifth episode, she received a record deal from Sony Music Italy. In 2013 she released her debut single as Yendry Fiorentino entitled Here, a dance pop song, which underperformed due to lack of promotion. Unsatisfied with the direction that Sony had decided for her, Yendry ended her contract in 2014 to pursue a career as an independent artist.

=== 2015–2018: Materianera ===
After ending her contract, Yendry formed the band Materianera with DJ and producer Alain Diamond and musician Davide "Enphy" Cuccu, performing as frontwoman. The band mixed trip hop, electronica, and alternative R&B. They debuted in 2015 through the label Tainted Music with the single Supernova, which preceded an EP of the same name released in December of that year. In 2016, Yendry appeared as a regular backing vocalist in Maurizio Crozza's program Crozza nel Paese delle Meraviglie, and was also a backing vocalist for the Italian singer Dolcenera at the Sanremo Music Festival 2016. Materianera received a nomination at the 2016 Italian MTV Music Award after having been named Artist of the Month by MTV New Generation in January of that year. The band released their next single "Space" in April 2017. In February 2018 they released the single "Hole in the Water" accompanied by a video shot in Naples in the quartieri spagnoli. The single preceded the album Abyss released on March 16, 2018, which was the band's final release.

=== 2019–2020: Solo projects in Spanish, record deal with RCA Records and Sony Music Latin ===
After Materianera, Yendry began to work on her solo music project in Spanish to honor her Dominican heritage. She moved to London, met her manager Chris Hesketh, and signed with his company Blacksheep Music Management and the independent label Liberator Music. In 2019 she started to travel between London and Los Angeles to record new music. In June 2019, she was the opening act at Sean Paul's London concert. On December 6, 2019, she released her first single entitled "Barrio", produced by B-CROMA and written by Yendry herself. The song, inspired by her mother's story, is an anthem to women's independence and freedom. The official video, directed and produced by MYBOSSWAS, tells the story of a young mother who is a victim of abuse, and decides to free herself with her supernatural powers. On April 10, 2020, she released the single "Nena," produced by Jeremia Jones. A Latin ballad with R&B elements, it is an autobiographical song that tells the story of her mother Rosa, at the moment of separation when she was forced to emigrate to Italy in search of a job, leaving her two-year-old daughter Yendry with the grandmother Ramona. The story is represented in the official music video directed by Kieran Khan. "Nena" earned Yendry international success after frequently appearing on popular Spotify Latino playlists. In September 2020 she performed "Nena" and "Barrio" for ColorsxStudios, with both videos receiving millions of views. She was approached by Sony Music Latin and RCA Records, with whom she signed a double recording contract. Her first single with RCA Records and Sony Music Latin, "El Diablo," was released on October 30, 2020. The song is a trilingual song written in English, Spanish, and Italian by Yendry and produced by MAX JAEGER & SANTELL. Yendry recorded the song in Los Angeles a couple of months before the release. The video for the single was directed by Alberto Chimenti Dezani and shot in Turin. "El Diablo" has been acclaimed by prominent international music outlets including Billboard. Yendry moved to Miami that year.

=== 2021–present: En El Patio, 2021 Latin AMAs, nomination for the 2022 Premio Lo Nuestro, Como agua ===
On February 5, 2021, she released the mini documentary En El Patio directed by Kieran Khan. The documentary was filmed in Herrera, Santo Domingo Oeste, the neighborhood where Yendry grew up and where her grandmother and part of her family still live. The documentary is a narrative of Yendry's Dominican origins and her journey to Italy with her mother. She simultaneously released the single "Se Acabó" featuring the Dominican rapper Mozart La Para. The song was written by Yendry with Mozart La Para and produced by XAXO and Fux Beat. The video for the single was shot in Herrera. In February 2021 she performed "El Diablo" and "Se Acabó" for Vevo Discovery. She performed "El Barrio" at the Latin American Music Awards of 2021. On May 21, 2021, she announced a collaboration with the Spanish fashion brand Desigual for the campaign Desigual x Esteban Cortázar. On May 28, 2021, she released the single "YA" written by herself and produced by Federico Vindver. The song is an exhortation to self-confidence. The video, directed by Kieran Khan, was shot in Medellín in Colombia near Cauca River. "YA" was selected by The New York Times as one of the best song of 2021 and is also part of Barack Obama's 2021 Spotify Playlist. In June 2021 her collaboration with the Emotional Oranges for the song "No Words" was released. On June 7, 2021, she was nominated for Best New Artist at the 2021 MTV Millennial Awards. On August 6, 2021, she released the single "You" featuring Damian Marley On November 19, 2021, she released "Instinto" with J Balvin, the song written with J Balvin and produced by Lexus & Keityn. The music video for the song was directed by José Emilio Sagaró and filmed in New York. She contributed "Love Is Not Hard to Find" to the Hotel Transylvania: Transformania soundtrack. In January 2022, she released "Mascarade" with Lous and the Yakuza for ColorsxStudios. She was nominated for Best New Female Artist for the 2022 Premio Lo Nuestro On May 6, 2022 she released the single "KI-KI" and directed the video herself along with Christopher Hesketh and Becky Hern. On February 10, 2023, she released the single "Herrera."

In 2026, Yendry announced her debut album Como agua, preceded by the singles "Mala mia," "Espejo," and "Mentira." The album was released on September 18.

== Musical influences ==
Yendry's style is a mix between bachata, merengue, salsa, R&B and electro. She has stated her influences include Beyoncé, Ella Fitzgerald, Otis Redding, Etta James, Whitney Houston, Frank Ocean, James Blake, Yoskar Sarante, and Juan Luis Guerra.

== Discography ==
=== Albums ===
Title	Details
Como agua	Released: September 18, 2026; Label: Sony Music Latin; Format: Streaming, digital download

=== Singles ===
==== As lead artist ====
List of singles, showing year released and album
Title	Year	Album
"Here"	2013	Non-album singles
"Barrio"	2019	Non-album singles
"Nena"	2020	Non-album singles
"El Diablo"	2020	Non-album singles
"Se Acabó" (featuring Mozart La Para)	2021	Non-album singles
"YA"	2021	Non-album singles
"You" (featuring Damian Marley)	2021	Non-album singles
"Instinto" (with J Balvin)	2021	Non-album singles
"Love Is Not Hard to Find"	2022	Hotel Transylvania: Transformania
"Mascarade" (with Lous and the Yakuza)	2022	Non-album singles
"KI-KI"	2022	Non-album singles
"Herrera"	2023	Non-album singles
"La Puerta"	2023	Non-album singles
"Mala mia"	2026	Como agua
"Espejo"	2026	Como agua
"Mentira"	2026	Como agua

==== As featured artist ====
List of singles, showing year released and album
Title	Year	Album
"Veinte años" (Nella featuring YEИDRY)	2024	En otra vida
"Escándalo" (Vale featuring YEИDRY)	2024	Todo lo que yo quería
"Lágrimas de sequía" (Lapili featuring YEИDRY and SEYSEY)	2024	Llanto de secano

=== Materianera discography ===
==== Extended plays ====
- 2015 - Supernova

==== Albums ====
- 2018 - Abyss

== Awards and nominations ==
- 2021 - MTV Millennial Awards - Best New Artist - nominee
- 2022 - Premio Lo Nuestro - Best New Female artist - nominee
