= Grande Fratello VIP season 3 =

Grande Fratello VIP
- Season 3
- Presented by: Ilary Blasi
- No. of days: 78
- No. of housemates: 23
- Winner: Walter Nudo
- Runner-up: Andrea Mainardi

Release
- Original network: Canale 5
- Original release: 24 September – 10 December 2018

Season chronology
- ← Previous; Season 2 Next → Season 4

Grande Fratello VIP 3 (as known by the acronym GFVIP3) is the third celebrity season of the Italian reality television franchise Grande Fratello.

It launched on 24 September 2018, on Canale 5 with Ilary Blasi as presenter of the gala show on air every week, and Alfonso Signorini as opinionist, and Gialappa's Band. It ended on 10 December 2018. The 24h live stream is broadcast on Mediaset Extra, daily recaps are broadcast on Canale 5, Italia 1 and La 5. The show was scheduled to air for 11 weeks.

== Housemates ==
The age of the housemates refers to the time of entry into the house.

Housemates	Age	Birthplace	Famous for...	Day entered	Day exited	Status
Walter Nudo	48	Montreal, Canada	Actor and model	1	78	Winner
Andrea Mainardi	35	Bergamo	Chef	1	78	Runner-up
Silvia Provvedi	24	Modena	Singers and TV personalities	1	78	3rd Place
Stefano Sala	28	Gravedona	Model	1	78	4th Place
Francesco Monte	30	Taranto	Actor and model	1	78	5th Place
Benedetta Mazza	28	Parma	Showgirl	1	78	17th Evicted
Giulia Salemi	25	Piacenza	Showgirl	1	71	16th Evicted
Lory Del Santo	60	Naples	Actress and TV personality	8	71	15th Evicted
Giulia Provvedi	24	Modena	Singers and TV personalities	1	64	14th Evicted
Martina Hamdy	24	Milan	Weather presenter	1	64	13th Evicted
Jane Alexander	45	Watford, United Kingdom	Actress	1	60	12th Evicted
Ivan Cattaneo	65	Bergamo	Singer	1	57	11th Evicted
Ela Weber	52	Dettelbach, Germany	Showgirl	29	50	10th Evicted
Alessandro Cecchi Paone	57	Rome	Television host	29	50	9th Evicted
Fabio Basile	23	Rivoli	Judoka	1	46	8th Evicted
Maria Monsè	44	Catania	Television host and actress	29	43	7th Evicted
Elia Fongaro	27	Arzignano	Model	1	36	6th Evicted
Daniela del Secco d'Aragona	67	Rome	Columnist and TV personality	1	32	5th Evicted
Eleonora Giorgi	64	Rome	Actress	1	29	4th Evicted
Enrico Silvestrin	46	Rome	Television and radio host	1	22	3rd Evicted
Maurizio Battista	61	Rome	Comic actor	1	20	Walked
Valerio Merola	63	Rome	Television host	1	15	2nd Evicted
Lisa Fusco	39	Naples	Showgirl, singer and actress	1	8	1st Evicted

== Nominations table ==
Blue team (Week 1 - 2)
Red team (Week 1 - 2)
Immune
2-in-1 housemate, their nominations counted as one. (Week 1 - 8)

=== Week 1 - Week 8 ===
	Week 1	Week 2	Week 3	Week 4	Week 5			Week 6	Week 7		Week 8		Nominations received
	Week 1	Week 2	Week 3	Week 4	Day 29		Day 32	Week 6	Day 43	Day 46	Week 8		Nominations received
Favorite of the House	none		Maurizio	Giulia P. & Silvia	none		Andrea	none		Stefano	none		Nominations received
Walter	Francesco	Giulia P. & Silvia	Daniela	Martina	Stefano	Elia	Elia	Alessandro; Maria	Nominated	Benedetta	Jane	Ivan	
Andrea	Jane	Ivan	Eleonora	Elia	Lory	Daniela	Exempt	Alessandro; Maria	Fabio; Ivan	Nominated	Giulia P. & Silvia	Ivan	
Silvia	Martina	Stefano	Enrico	Elia	Lory	Elia	Ivan	Alessandro; Maria	Benedetta; Walter	Saved	Saved	Lory	
Stefano	Andrea	Ivan	Enrico	Elia	Nominated	Ivan	Saved	Alessandro; Maria	Fabio; Ivan	Nominated	Benedetta	Ivan	
Francesco	Giulia P. & Silvia	Ivan	Ivan	Elia	Lory	Jane	Martina	Saved	Fabio; Ivan	Saved	Giulia S.	Ivan	
Benedetta	Enrico	Elia	Eleonora	Eleonora	Lory	Elia	Martina	Alessandro; Maria	Nominated	Exempt	Saved	Lory	
Giulia S.	Enrico	Elia	Enrico	Jane	Lory	Elia	Saved	Saved	Saved	Benedetta	Saved	Jane	
Lory	Not in House	Exempt	Enrico	Daniela	Nominated	Exempt	Saved; Fabio	Alessandro; Maria	Benedetta; Walter	Andrea	Nominated	Martina	
Giulia P.	Martina	Stefano	Enrico	Elia	Lory	Elia	Ivan	Alessandro; Maria	Benedetta; Walter	Saved	Saved	Lory	
Martina	Walter	Jane	Lory	Lory	Lory	Daniela	Nominated	Alessandro; Maria	Saved	Andrea	Nominated	Lory	
Jane	Stefano	Francesco	Eleonora	Eleonora	Lory	Ivan	Elia	Saved	Exempt	Saved	Saved	Lory	
Ivan	Martina	Jane	Enrico	Francesco	Stefano	Jane	Nominated	Ela; Giulia S.	Nominated	Alessandro	Lory	Francesco	10
Ela	Not in House				Exempt			Saved	Exempt	Alessandro	Nominated	Evicted (Day 50)	1
Alessandro	Not in House				Exempt			Nominated	Exempt	Nominated	Evicted (Day 50)		8
Fabio	Valerio	Daniela	Eleonora	Lory	Lory	Daniela	Ivan	Alessandro; Maria	Nominated	Evicted (Day 46)			3
Maria	Not in House				Exempt			Nominated	Evicted (Day 43)				8
Elia	Benedetta	Enrico	Eleonora	Eleonora	Lory	Daniela	Nominated	Evicted (Day 36)					12
Daniela	Lisa	Valerio	Eleonora	Eleonora	Lory	Martina	Evicted (Day 32)						8
Eleonora	Martina	Martina	Enrico	Daniela	Francesco; Lory; Stefano	Evicted (Day 29)							11
Enrico	Elia	Valerio	Ivan	Evicted (Day 22)									10
Maurizio	Elia	Valerio	Eleonora	Walked (Day 20)									0
Valerio	Lisa	Benedetta	Evicted (Day 15)										4
Lisa	Enrico	Evicted (Day 8)											2
Note	1	1	2							3			
Nominated For Eviction	Andrea; Elia; Enrico; Francesco; Giulia P. & Silvia; Lisa; Jane; Martina; Stefano; Walter	Elia; Ivan; Jane; Valerio	Eleonora; Enrico; Ivan	Daniela; Eleonora; Elia; Lory	Lory; Stefano	Daniela; Elia; Ivan; Jane	Elia; Ivan; Martina	Alessandro; Maria	Benedetta; Fabio; Ivan; Walter	Alessandro; Andrea; Stefano	Ela; Lory; Martina	Ivan; Lory	
Walked	none		Maurizio	none									
Evicted	Lisa; 33% to evict	Valerio; 47% to evict	Enrico; 39% to evict	Eleonora; 36% to evict	Lory; 10 of 12 votes to evict	Daniela; 32% to evict	Elia; 38% to evict	Maria; 52% to evict	Fabio; 20% to save	Alessandro; 22% to save	Ela; 21% to save	Ivan; 49.7% to save	
Survived	Enrico; 21% Giulia P. & Silvia; 8% Francesco; 8% Elia; 7% Martina; 6% Stefano; 5% Andrea; 5% Jane; 4% Walter; 3%	Ivan; 28% Elia; 16% Jane; 9%	Ivan; 34% Eleonora; 27%	Daniela; 34% Elia; 22% Lory; 8%	Stefano; 2 of 12 votes	Ivan; 31% Elia; 27% Jane; 10%	Martina; 34% Ivan; 28%	Alessandro; 48%	Benedetta; 32% Walter; 26% Ivan; 22%	Stefano; 46% Andrea; 32%	Lory; 51% Martina; 28%	Lory; 50.3%	

=== Week 9 - Finale ===
Tie-breaker vote

	Week 9					Week 10		Week 11				Final				Nominations received
	Day 57			Day 60		Week 10		Week 11				Final				Nominations received
Walter	Silvia	Saved	Jane	Francesco	Nominated	Saved	Benedetta	Saved	Andrea	Nominated	Finalist		Nominated	Finalist	Winner (Day 78)	4
Walter	Silvia	Saved	Jane	Francesco	Nominated	Saved	Benedetta	Saved	Andrea	Nominated	Finalist		Nominated	Finalist	Winner (Day 78)	4
Andrea	Silvia	Nominated	Martina	Francesco	Martina; Stefano	Nominated	Benedetta	Immune	Walter	Finalist		Nominated	Finalist	Nominated	Runner-Up (Day 78)	1
Silvia	Nominated	Saved	Walter	Finalist	Walter	Finalist			Andrea	Finalist				Nominated	Third Place (Day 78)	2
Stefano	Giulia P.	Saved	Walter	Francesco	Nominated	Saved	Andrea	Nominated	Benedetta	Saved	Nominated	Finalist	Nominated	Fourth Place (Day 78)		2
Francesco	Silvia	Saved	Jane	Candidate	Finalist				Stefano	Finalist		Nominated	Fifth Place (Day 78)			3
Benedetta	Silvia	Nominated	Walter	Giulia S.	Walter	Nominated	Lory	Saved	Stefano	Nominated	Nominated	Evicted (Day 78)				4
Benedetta	Silvia	Nominated	Walter	Giulia S.	Walter	Nominated	Lory	Saved	Andrea	Nominated	Nominated	Evicted (Day 78)				4
Giulia S.	Silvia	Nominated	Jane	Candidate	Martina	Saved	Lory	Nominated	Evicted (Day 71)							1
Lory	Silvia	Nominated	Martina	Francesco	Stefano	Saved	Benedetta	Evicted (Day 71)								2
Giulia P.	Nominated	Nominated	Walter	Francesco	Saved	Nominated	Evicted (Day 64)									2
Martina	Giulia P.	Saved	Walter	Giulia S.	Nominated	Evicted (Day 64)										6
Jane	Silvia	Saved	Walter	Evicted (Day 60)												6
Ivan	Evicted (Day 57)															10
Note																
Nominated For Eviction	Andrea; Benedetta; Giulia S. Lory; Silvia		Jane; Walter	Francesco; Giulia S.	Martina; Stefano; Walter	Andrea; Benedetta; Giulia P.	Benedetta; Lory	Giulia S. Stefano	Andrea; Stefano	Benedetta; Walter	Benedetta; Stefano	Andrea; Francesco	Stefano; Walter	Andrea; Silvia	Andrea; Walter	
Walked	none															
Evicted	Silvia; 28% to be finalist		Jane; 31% to save	Francesco; 5 of 7 votes to be finalist	Martina; 12% to save	Giulia P. 24% to save	Lory; 42% to save	Giulia S. 37% to save	Andrea; Benedetta & Walter's choice to be finalist	Walter; 69% to be finalist	Benedetta; 49% to be finalist	Francesco; 57% to evict	Stefano; 67% to evict	Silvia; 70% to evict	Andrea; 44% to win	
Survived	Lory; 26% Giulia S 18% Andrea; 14% Benedetta; 13%		Walter; 69%	Giulia S. 2 of 7 votes	Walter; 52% Stefano; 36%	Andrea; 45% Benedetta; 31%	Benedetta; 58%	Stefano; 63%	Stefano; 2 of 6 votes	Benedetta; 31%	Stefano; 51%	Andrea; 43%	Walter; 33%	Andrea; 30%	Walter; 56% to win	

=== Note ===
- ^Note 1 : Housemates are divided into two teams. They are only able to nominate one housemate from their team.
- ^Note 2 : Maurizio walked from the house for personal reasons.
- ^Note 3 : Stefano, favorite of the house, renounces his immunity to exchange with Benedetta.

== TV Ratings ==
Episode	Date	Viewers	Share
1	September 24, 2018	3.341.000	20.95%
2	October 1, 2018	3.200.000	19.00%
3	October 8, 2018	3.044.000	19.07%
4	October 15, 2018	3.242.000	20.01%
5	October 22, 2018	3.587.000	21.60%
6	October 25, 2018	3.203.000	19.11%
7	October 29, 2018	3.876.000	21.20%
8	November 5, 2018	3.705.000	21.02%
9	November 8, 2018	3.057.000	16.90%
10	November 12, 2018	3.769.000	20.88%
11	November 19, 2018	3.607.000	20.70%
12	November 22, 2018	3.021.000	17.21%
13	November 26, 2018	3.567.000	20.80%
Semifinal	December 3, 2018	3.505.000	20.30%
Final	December 10, 2018	3.446.000	21.90%
Average		3.411.000	20.03%
