= Donatella (group) =

Le Donatella
- Born: Giulia and Silvia Provvedi; 1 December 1993 (age 32); Modena, Italy
- Genres: Pop music, Dance-pop, Electronic dance music, Electronic music, Cloud rap
- Occupations: Singers; Television personalities
- Years active: 2012–present
- Labels: Agidi and Sony Music Entertainment (2012–2015)

The Le Donatella are an Italian music and television duo formed by the twins Giulia and Silvia Provvedi (Modena, 1 December 1993).

In the autumn of 2012, the Provvedi sisters (with the name Provs Destination) participated at the sixth season of X Factor Italia aired by Sky Uno and hosted by Alessandro Cattelan. During this talent show, the judge Arisa changed the name of the group in Le Donatella.

Giulia (the blonde) and Silvia (the brunette) in the winter of 2015 participated and won the tenth season of L'isola dei Famosi hosted by Alessia Marcuzzi with Alvin; the Provvedi sisters posed totally naked for the cover of Playboy Italia (the Italian edition of Playboy) in October 2015.

== Biography and career ==
In 2012 Giulia and Silvia Provvedi, at the age of 18 years, participating as a musical duo to hearings of the sixth edition of the talent show X Factor Italia, broadcast on Sky Uno, appearing as Provs Destination. After passing the various early stages and preliminaries of the transmission, are chosen as competitors of the program became part of the category "Vocal Groups" led by judge Arisa, which changes the name of the duo in Donatella, in honor of Donatella Rettore, an Italian singer admired by the twins: during the program will then be eliminated at the halfway point, namely the 4th live show, with 54.70% of the votes.

In 2013, Donatella produced, under contract with Agidi and distributed by Sony Music Entertainment, their album debut, published on 8 April, of Unpredictable. From that disk are extracted, respectively, as the output order, individual Fooled Again, Magic e Love Comes Quickly (a cover of Pet Shop Boys), accompanied by their respective video clips. In that summer Donatella duet with Juan Magán in the song Mal de Amores, soundtrack spot for Maxibon in rotation in Spain and Italy. Donatella on 19 September 2014 published a single sung in Italian entitled Scarpe Diem, where for the first time experiencing rap sounds. The song was born from a collaboration with Two Fingerz, with the participation of rapper Fred De Palma.

In 2015, from 2 February to 23 March, Donatella participated as the only competitor in the tenth edition of the reality show The island's famous, broadcast on Canale 5, program that won with 68.38% of the preference to remote voting, beating the French model Brice Martinet, which is the second rank. Following the victory of the program start a DJ tour records in clubs and participate as guests in several TV shows, including Grand Hotel Chiambretti, Colorado e Caduta libera! aired by Mediaset. On 8 May the Donatella published the single Donatella, produced by DJ Tommy Vee and Mauro Ferrucci, cover the eponymous song of 1981 by Donatella Rettore, who has appreciated the project taking her own part in the realization of the individual with a vocal participation. The official music video of the song was released three days later, on 11 May.

Donatella on 7 June released the music video for Vamonos, single dance group Il pagante, where Donatella appear in a cameo in the opening scenes. Donatella on 9 June participate as competitors in Rai 2 variety program Detto Fatto Night hosted by Caterina Balivo in prime time, where Donatella perform in a burlesque number. Throughout the summer 2015, and in subsequent months, Donatella continue to perform in clubs and events with the DJ Set tour. Donatella in October posing nude for the Italian edition of the famous magazine Playboy, with a photo shoot made by Fabrizio Corona, for which they are invited on 26 October in the program Le Iene, conducted by Ilary Blasi and Teo Mammucari on Italia 1. Donatella on 20 November 2015 released the single Baby Bastard Inside, accompanied by the relevant video clips posted on YouTube the next day. The next 18 December Donatella released the Christmas single Vivere, whose proceeds will be donated to charity organization Terre des hommes. In 2016 Donatella they make their debut as TV presenters presenting Italian Pro Surfer, surf talent show on the air in the late evening on Italia 1 from 5 June. In 2018, Le Donatella participated in the second season of the Italian version of the talent show Dance Dance Dance, aired on Fox Life. During the season finale they qualified second. In the same year they also competed as one housemate (but were later divided and became two different contestants) in Grande Fratello VIP, the italian adaptation of Celebrity Big Brother. Silvia got 3rd place, while Giulia got 9th place.

From 2019 to 2021, they appeared in the Italian version of the All Together Now talent series, as part of the hundred judges.

=== Personal life ===
Silvia Provvedi (the brunette of Donatella) was engaged with Fabrizio Corona: note that in November 2015 Silvia was 22 and Fabrizio 41. They broke up in 2018.

== Composition ==
- Silvia Provvedi: voice
- Giulia Provvedi: voice

== Discography ==
=== Albums ===
Year	Title	Charts
Year	Title	ITA
2013	Unpredictable: Published: 8 April 2013; Labels: Agidi/Sony Music Entertainment; Formats: CD, digital download	40

=== Singles ===
Year	Title	Charts	Album
Year	Title	ITA	Album
2012	Fooled Again	43	Unpredictable
2013	Magic	–	Unpredictable
2013	Love Comes Quickly	–	Unpredictable
2014	Scarpe Diem (featuring Fred De Palma)	–	Non-album singles
2015	Donatella (featuring Rettore)	–	Non-album singles
2015	Baby Bastard Inside	–	Non-album singles
2015	Vivere	–	Non-album singles
2019	Scusami ma esco	–	Non-album singles
2019	One Love	–	Non-album singles
2021	Moralisti su pornhub	–	Non-album singles

=== Musical participations ===
- 2012: X Factor Compilation 2012 with Timebomb

=== Music videos ===
- 2012: Fooled Again
- 2013: Magic
- 2014: Scarpe Diem
- 2015: Donatella
- 2015: Vamonos of "Il Pagante"
- 2015: Baby Bastard Inside
- 2019: Scusami ma esco
- 2019: One Love
- 2021: Moralisti su Pornhub

== Tours ==
- 2015: DJ Set Tour

== Filmography ==
- La California (2022) – as Ester and Alice

== Television programs ==
- X Factor 6 (Sky Uno, 2012) – as Contestants
- L'isola dei famosi 10 (Canale 5, 2015) – as Contestants [First place]
- Italian Pro Surfer (Italia 1, 2016) – as Presenters
- Dance Dance Dance (Fox Life, 2018) - as Contenstants [Second place]
- Grande Fratello VIP (season 3) (Canale 5, 2018) – as one housemate
- All Together Now (Canale 5, 2019–2021) – as Judges
- Avanti un altro! (Canale 5, 2023–present) – as part of Salottino
