= Songbook Vol. 1 (Mika album) =

Greatest hits album by Mika
- Released: 18 November 2013
- Recorded: 2006–2013
- Length: 52:08
- Label: Universal; Island
- Producer: Greg Wells; Benny Benassi; Peter Mayes; Nick Littlemore; Benjamin Garrett; Jason Nevins; RedOne

Mika chronology
The Origin of Love (2012)	Songbook Vol. 1 (2013)	No Place in Heaven (2015)

Singles from Songbook Vol. 1
- 1. "Live Your Life" Released: 4 June 2013; 2. "Stardust" Released: 12 November 2013

Songbook Vol. 1 (full title Songbook Vol. 1 – I più grandi successi) is the first greatest hits compilation released by British singer-songwriter Mika. The album was released on 18 November 2013 in Italy, following Mika's appointment as a judge on the Italian version of The X Factor, and his number one single in the country, "Stardust", featuring Chiara. The new version of "Stardust", "Live Your Life" and a pop edited version of his ballad-oriented hit "Happy Ending" are exclusive to this release, and do not appear on any of Mika's other albums.

After debuting at number four on the Italian Albums Chart, Songbook Vol. 1 peaked at number three in Italy during its second week. The album was later certified double platinum by the Federation of the Italian Music Industry, denoting sales in excess of 120,000 units in Italy.

== Track listing ==
No.	Title	Writer(s)	Producer(s)	Length
1.	"Relax, Take It Easy"	Mika	Greg Wells	3:42
2.	"Grace Kelly"	Mika, Jodi Marr, John Merchant, Dan Warner	Greg Wells	3:05
3.	"Stardust" (featuring Chiara)	Mika, Wayne Hector, Benny Benassi, Alessandro Benassi	Greg Wells, Benny Benassi	4:10
4.	"Celebrate" (featuring Pharrell Williams)	Mika, Pharrell Williams, Benjamin Garrett	Peter Mayes, Nick Littlemore, Benjamin Garrett	3:08
5.	"We Are Golden"	Mika	Greg Wells	3:58
6.	"Origin of Love" (Single version)	Mika, Nick Littlemore, Paul Steel	Greg Wells, Nick Littlemore	3:15
7.	"Big Girl (You Are Beautiful)"	Mika, Jodi Marr, John Merchant, Dan Warner	Greg Wells	4:10
8.	"Rain"	Mika, Jodi Marr	Greg Wells	3:43
9.	"Underwater"	Mika, Nick Littlemore, Paul Steel	Greg Wells, Nick Littlemore	3:12
10.	"Popular Song" (featuring Ariana Grande)	Mika, Priscilla Renea, Mathieu Jomphe, Stephen Schwartz	Greg Wells, Jason Nevins	3:20
11.	"Blame It on the Girls"	Mika	Greg Wells	3:34
12.	"Live Your Life"	Mika, Jodi Marr	Greg Wells	2:58
13.	"Love Today"	Mika	Greg Wells	3:57
14.	"Kick Ass (We Are Young)" (featuring RedOne)	Mika, Jodi Marr, Nadir Khayat	RedOne	3:12
15.	"Happy Ending" (Pop edit)	Mika	Greg Wells	3:32

== Release history ==
Region	Date	Format	Label
Italy	18 November 2013	Standard, deluxe	Universal Music, Island Records

== Charts ==
Chart (2013)	Peak position
Italy	3

== Certifications ==
Region	Certification	Certified units/sales
Italy (FIMI)	3× Platinum	180,000^{*}
^{*} Sales figures based on certification alone.
