= X Factor (Italian TV series) season 6 =

X Factor
- Season 6
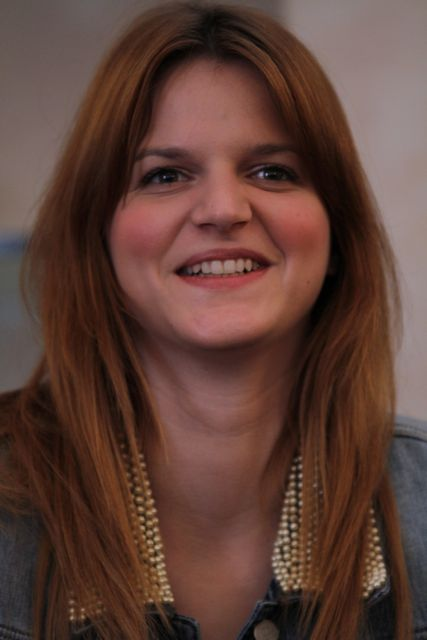
- Hosted by: Alessandro Cattelan (Sky Uno)
- Judges: Simona Ventura; Morgan; Elio; Arisa
- Winner: Chiara Galiazzo
- Winning mentor: Morgan
- Runner-up: Ics
- Finals venue: Teatro della Luna, Assago

Release
- Original network: Sky Italia
- Original release: 20 September – 7 December 2012

Season chronology
- ← Previous; Season 5 Next → Season 7

X Factor is an Italian television music competition to find new singing talent; the winner receives a € 300,000 recording contract with Sony Music. Before the start of the auditions process it was confirmed that Simona Ventura, Morgan, Elio and Arisa would be confirmed as judges and mentors; also Alessandro Cattelan returned as host, whilst Max Novaresi and Brenda Lodigiani return to host Xtra Factor. The sixths season began airing on Sky Uno on 20 September and ended on 7 December 2012.

Auditions for season 6 took place in Rimini, Andria and Milan in June 2012; bootcamp took place in Milan for two days, on 28 and 29 June. Morgan mentored the Over-25s, Ventura the boys, Elio the girls and Arisa the groups; they selected their final three acts during judges' houses. The Live Shows started on 18 October at Teatro della Luna, Assago. On Live Show 3 (1 November), the 12 finalists were joined by a 13th wildcard, voted for by the public after each judge picked one of their rejected to return.

Chiara Galiazzo, a member of the category Over-25s and mentored by Morgan, was announced the winner of the competition on 7 December 2012. Her winner's single, "Due respiri", released immediately after the end of the show, was co-written by Italian singer-songwriter Eros Ramazzotti.

== Judges, presenters and other personnel ==
Series 6 Judges

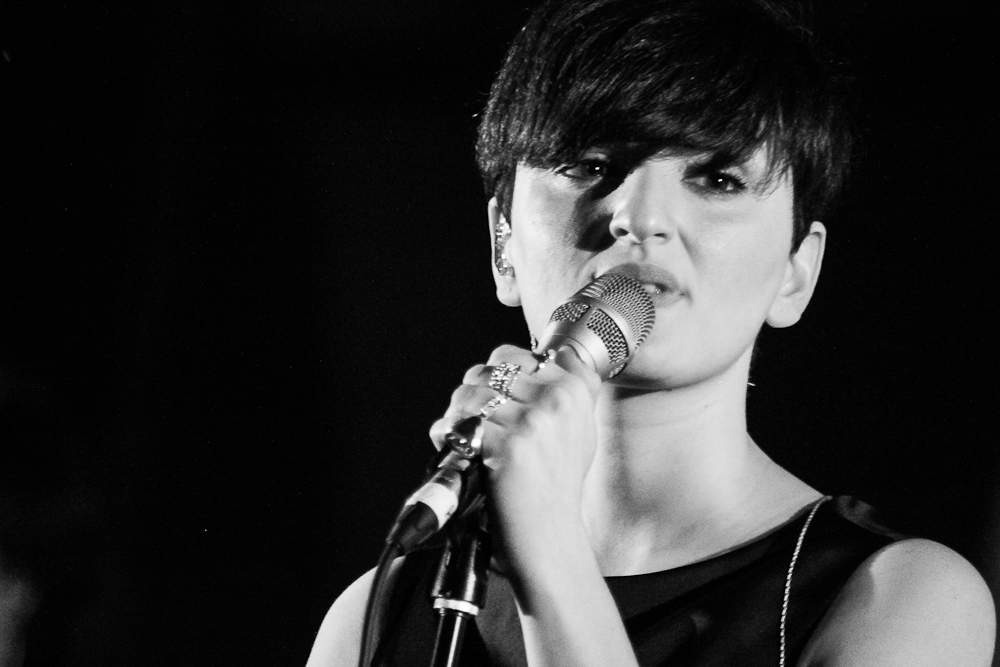
Arisa

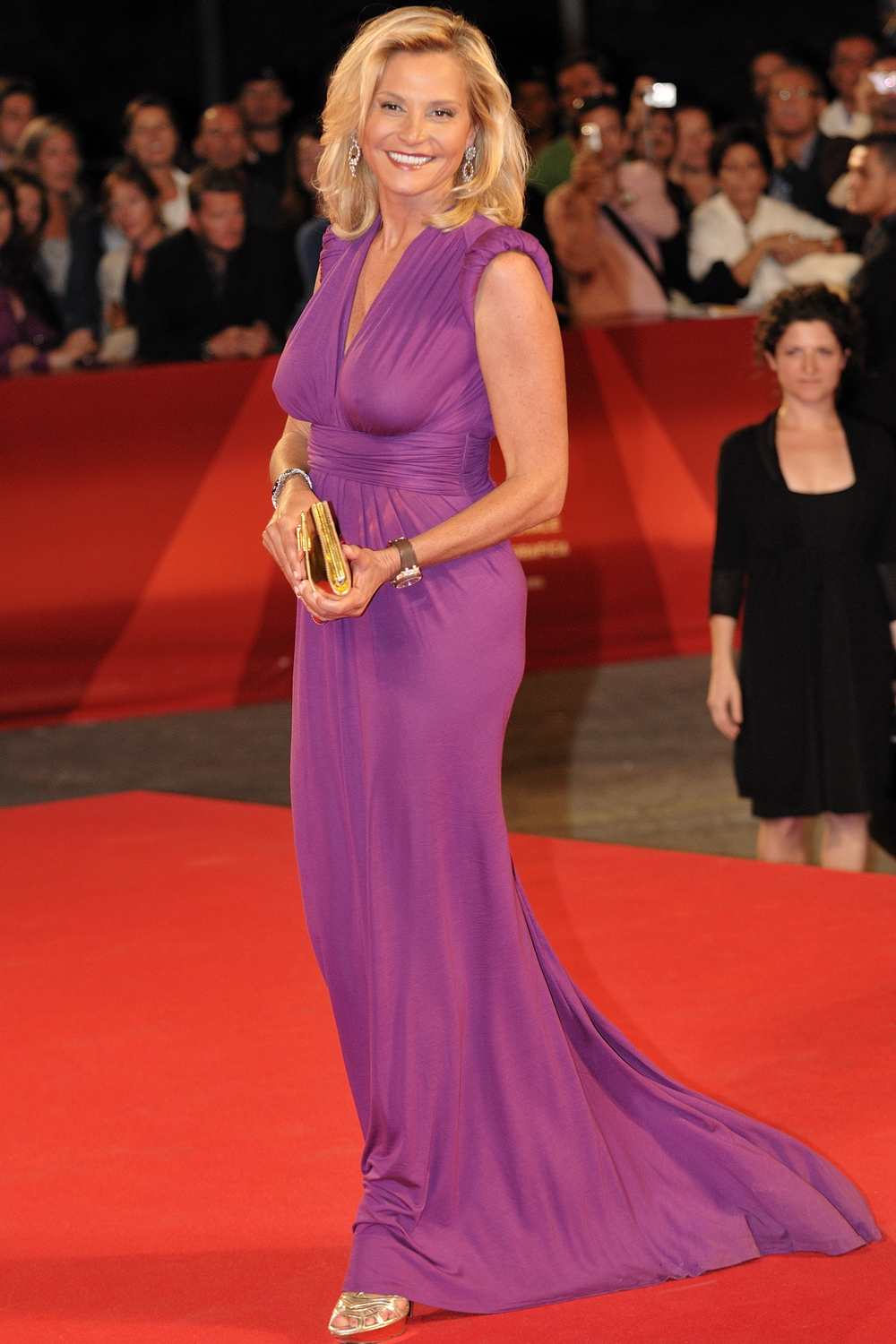
Simona Ventura

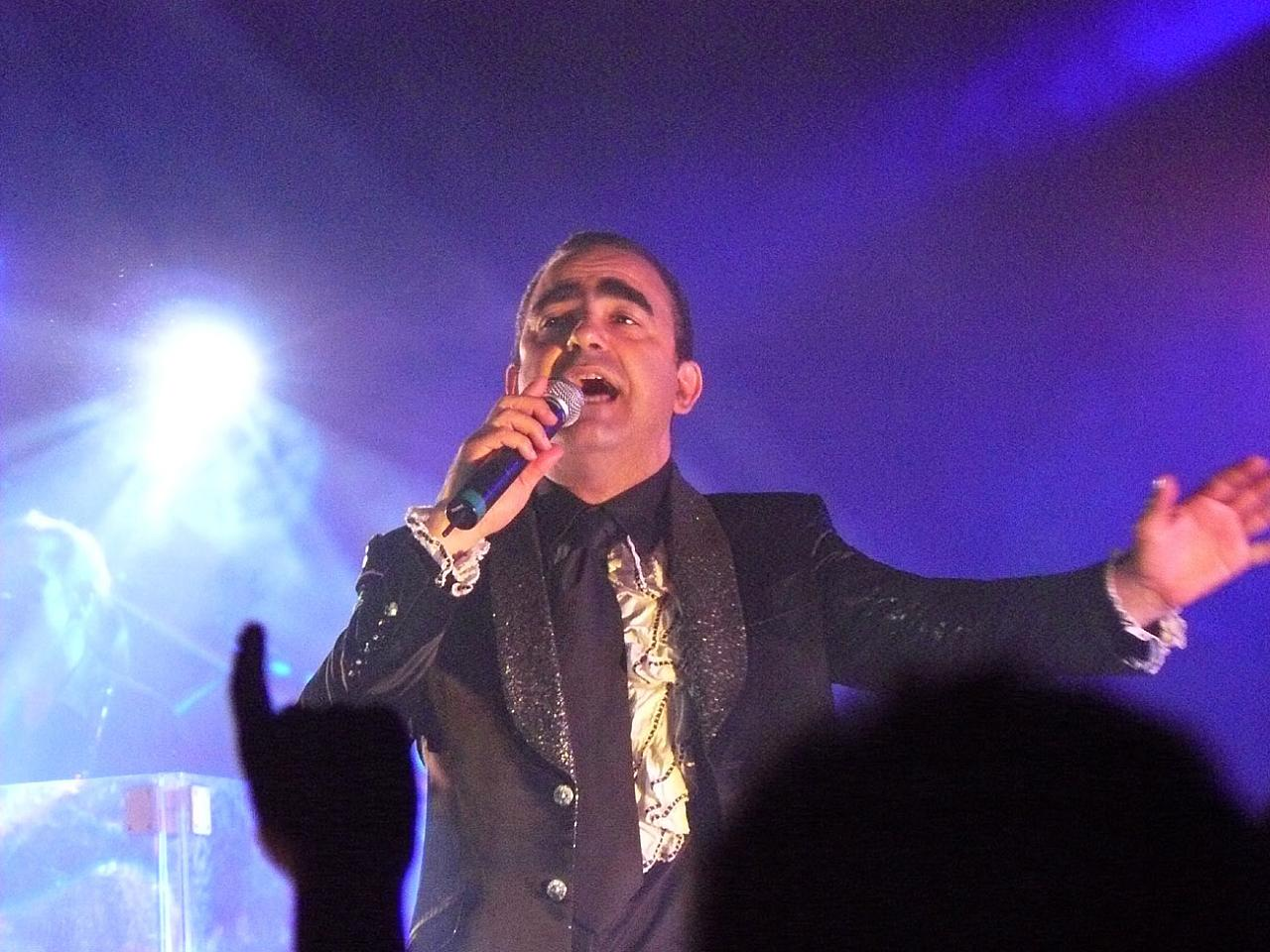
Elio

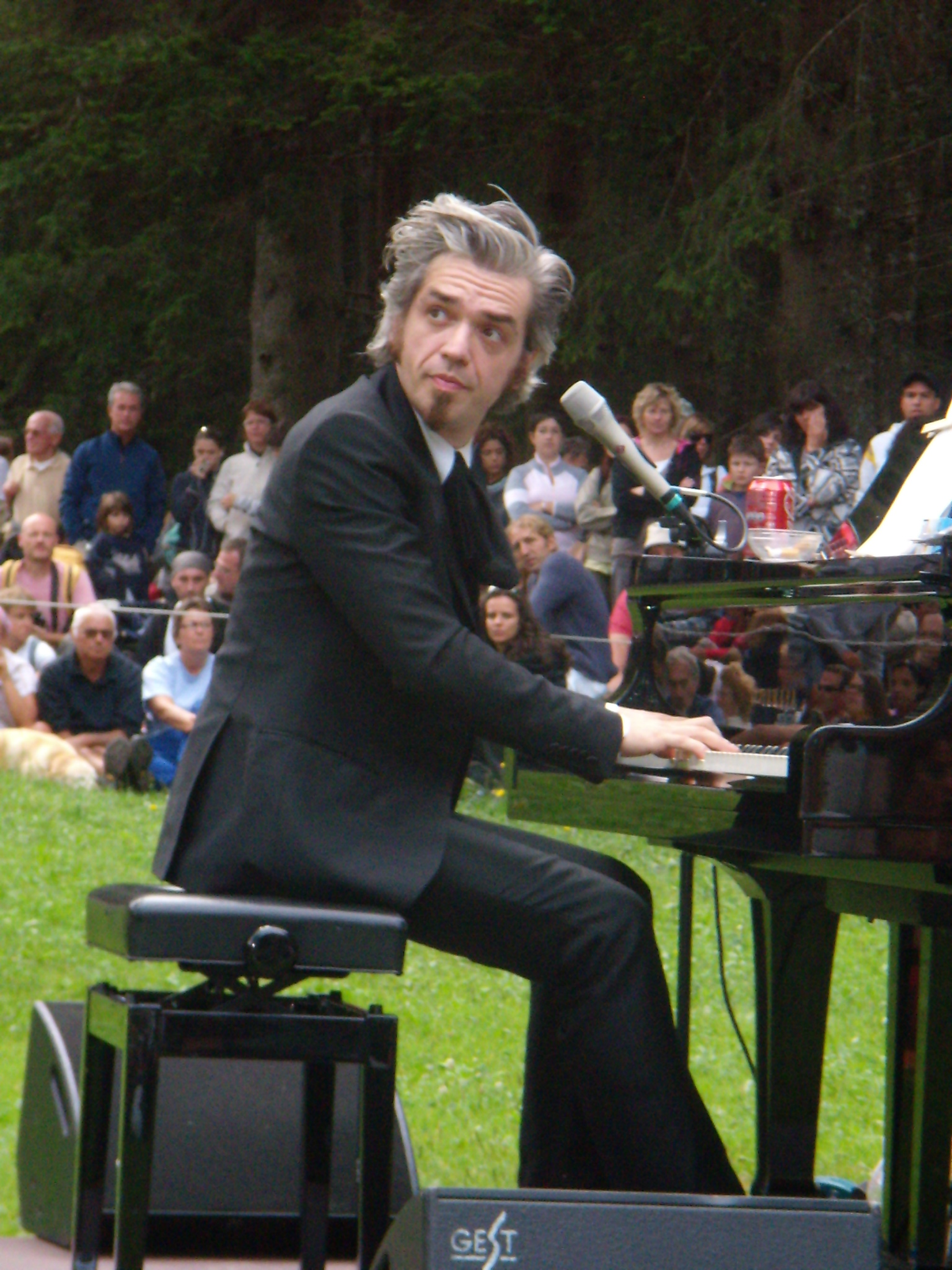
Morgan

Sky Italia entirely confirmed the cast of X Factor 5 for the sixths season. On 12 April 2012, Alessandro Cattelan was confirmed to present the main show on Sky Uno HD. Rumors about a possible replacement as a judge of Arisa with singer Gianna Nannini were soon denied, and indeed it was confirmed on 25 May that all the judges of the fifth series (Arisa, Simona Ventura, Elio, Morgan) would return to their role.

Also vocal coaches Alberto Tafuri, Paola Folli and Giuseppe Barbera, music-director Lucio Fabbri and art-director and choreographer Luca Tomassini were confirmed, whilst vocal-coach Gaetano Cappa replaced Diego Calvetti in the role.

== Selection process ==
=== Applications and auditions ===
Cities that auditions and/or pre-auditions were held in.

A preliminary phase of auditions was held:

- at Fiera del Levante, Bari, on 5 and 6 May 2012;
- at MiCo, Milan, from 19 to 21 May;
- at Foro Italico, Rome, from 26 to 28 May.

The judges auditions were held:

- at 105 Stadium, Rimini, on 9 and 10 June 2012;
- at Palazzetto dello Sport, Andria, on 16 and 17 June;
- at Teatro Nazionale, Milan, on 23 and 24 June.

The first episode of audition was broadcast on 20 September 2009, and featured auditions from Rimini and Milan; Andria auditions, along with those from Rome, were shown on 27 September.

Notable auditioners included Miss Italia 2011 Stefania Bivone, Michele Grandinetti, a singer already famous in Thailand with his stage name Miki del Re, and performer and actress Carmen Serra.

=== Bootcamp ===
96 acts reached Bootcamp, which took place at the Teatro Nazionale in Milan over two days, on Thursday 28 and Friday 29 June, and was broadcast on 4 October.

- On the first day, judges reviewed the audition tapes and sent home 1/3 of the acts before they had another chance to sing, soon after their arrival in Milan;
- the remaining 65 acts were then put into groups and took part in a sing-off: each group was assigned a song to prepare for the next morning. Members of the groups could choose which part of the song to sing, in agreement with the other components. After each performance, the judges decided which acts to keep and which to eliminate. The number of acts was reduced to 41;
- the acts had only 4 hours to choose one song from a list of 100 and perform it in front of the judges. Later, the judges decided which 24 acts to put through to judges' houses.

At the end of Bootcamp, judges met the acts of the category they had to mentor: Girls were to be mentored by Elio, Boys by Simona Ventura, Groups by Arisa and Over-25 by Morgan.

=== Judges' houses ===
"Home visits" was broadcast on 11 October. Ventura mentored the Boys in Costa Smeralda, assisted by vocal coach Paola Folli; Elio took the Girls at Villa Gaia, Robecco sul Naviglio, assisted by Alberto Tafuri; Morgan had the over 25s in Teatro Regio, Parma, with Gaetano Cappa, and Arisa had the Groups in Lake Como with Giuseppe Barbera.

One of the acts from the 25+ category, Mara Sottocornola, frightened by the mechanisms of the competition, decided to not take part in this phase, preferring to accept a proposal for an opera-stage in Brussels, and wasn't replaced.

The eleven eliminated acts were:

- Boys: Alessandro Mahmoud, Francesco Vecchio, Carmelo Veneziano Broccia
- Girls: Gaya Misrachi, Marta Pedoni, Lucrezia Rossetti
- 25+: Didie Caria, Michele Grandinetti
- Groups: Brutte Abitudini, Diamond Sisters, Up3Side

== Contestants and categories ==
Key:

– Winner
– Runner-up
– Third / Fourth place

Category (mentor)	Acts			
Boys (Ventura)	Nicola Aliotta	Daniele Coletta	Alessandro Mahmoud	Davide Merlini
Girls (Elio)	Cixi	Yendry Fiorentino	Nice	
25+ (Morgan)	Romina Falconi	Chiara Galiazzo	Ics	
Groups (Arisa)	Akmé	Donatella	Fréres Chaos	

=== Boys ===
- Nicola Aliotta (born 26 April 1992) is a student from Rome. Before X Factor 6, he previously appeared in the television music competition Ti lascio una canzone. He sang "Come il sole all'improvviso" at the judges auditions in Andria obtaining 4 "yes's", "Without You" (for the group performance) at the Bootcamp and "Nessun dolore" at the Home Visits, where he and Alessandro Mahmoud had to perform again before Simona Ventura could make a final decision. He sang "Solo per te".
- Daniele Coletta (born 10 February 1992) was born in Rome, and he's unemployed. Before X Factor 6, he previously appeared in the television music competition Ti lascio una canzone (2008). He sang "21 Guns" at the judges auditions in Rome obtaining 4 "yes's", "Don't Stop Me Now" (for the group performance) and "I Don't Want to Miss a Thing" at the Bootcamp and "I Can't Stand the Rain" at the Home Visits.
- Davide Merlini (born 28 April 1992) was born in Marostica, Veneto, and he works as boiler maintener technician. He sang "Avrai" at the judges auditions in Rimini obtaining 4 "yes's", "Vent'anni" at the Bootcamp and "Tracce di te" at the Home Visits.
- Alessandro Mahmoud (born 12 September 1992) was born in Milan. He's of Egyptian descent. He sang "Black and Gold" at the judges auditions in Milan obtaining 4 "yes's", "Turning Tables" (for the group performance) at the Bootcamp and "Walk On By" at the Home Visits, where he and Nicola Aliotta had to perform again before Simona Ventura could make a final decision. Mahmoud sang "Marzo (Le cose non vanno mai come credi)" and lost to Nicola Aliotta; in the second live show, on 25 October, he won the wildcard and entered as a finalist after 1 November.

=== Girls ===
- Cixi (born 11 April 1996) is a fashion-design student from Chieri, Piedmont; her real name's Eleonora Bosio. She performed "History Repeating" at the judges auditions in Rimini obtaining 3 "yes's" from Elio, Morgan and Arisa and one "no" from Ventura. She sang "Turning Tables" for the group performance at the Bootcamp and "Tutto quello che un uomo" at the Home Visits.
- Yendry Fiorentino (born 27 July 1993) is a fashion model. Born in Santo Domingo, she lives in Turin. She performed "Video Games" at the judges auditions in Milan obtaining 4 "yes's". She sang "Price Tag" (group performance) and "Una poesia anche per te" at the Bootcamp and "Le tasche piene di sassi" at the Home Visits, where she and Gaya Misrachi had to perform again before Elio could make a final decision. She sang "I'd Rather Go Blind".
- Nice (born 12 November 1992) is a Foreign Languages student from Turin; her real name is Noemi Lucco Borlera. She sang "Dog Days Are Over" at the judges auditions in Rimini obtaining 4 "yes's", "Hey, Soul Sister" (for the group performance) and "Piece of My Heart" at the Bootcamp and "Abitudine" at the Home Visits.

=== 25+ ===
- Romina Falconi (born 1 January 1985) is a singer from Rome. In 2007 she competed in Sanremo Music Festival and in 2009 she worked as choirgirl during Eros Ramazzotti's World Tour. She sang "Fortissimo" at the judges auditions in Rimini obtaining 4 "yes's", "Cuore scoppiato" (for the group performance) at the Bootcamp and "Crazy" at the Home Visits.
- Chiara Galiazzo (born 12 August 1986) is a finance trainée from Padua. She sang "Teardrop" at the auditions in front of the judges, in Milan, who acclaimed her for the performance. She sang "Back to Black" (for the group performance) and "The World Is Not Enough" at the Bootcamp and "Shake It Out" at the Home Visits.
- Ics (born 19 May 1983) is a rapper from Bologna who previously published some of his works through independent circuits with the stage nome of Morgan Ics. He sang "La crisi" at the judges auditions in Rimini obtaining 3 "yes's" from Elio, Morgan and Arisa and one "no" from Ventura. He later performed "Price Tag" (for the group performance) and "Notorious" at the Bootcamp and "Nessun dorma" at the Home Visits.

=== Groups ===
- Akmé is a group formed by Rosa D'Aprile (born 26 October 1982), Vitantonio Boccuzzi (born 8 December 1990) and Vito Marchitelli (born 7 August 1991) in the Province of Bari. They sang "21 Guns" at the judges auditions in Milan obtaining 4 "yes's", and "Otherside" at the Home Visits.
- Donatella is a group formed by twin-sisters Giulia and Silvia Provvedi (born 1 December 1993), from Modena. They performed "Il mare d'inverno" at the judges auditions in Bari, with the stage name "Provs Destination", obtaining 4 "yes's"; later they sang "Folle città" (for the group performance) at the Bootcamp and "Snow on the Sahara" at the Home Visits.
- Frères Chaos is a group formed by siblings Fabio (born 1 March 1988) and Manuela Rinaldi (born 10 March 1993), from Magliano di Tenna, Marche. Manuela Rinaldi previously appeared on talent show Ti lascio una canzone (2008). They performed "Altrove" at the judges auditions in Rimini, obtaining 4 "yes's"; later they sang "Sally" (for the group performance) and "Love the Way You Lie" at the Bootcamp and "Seven Nation Army" at the Home Visits.

== Live shows ==
=== Results summary ===
The number of votes received by each act were released by Sky Italia after the final.

Colour key

–	Contestant was in the bottom two/three and had to sing again in the final showdown
–	Contestant was in the bottom three but received the fewest votes and was immediately eliminated
–	Contestant received the fewest public votes and was immediately eliminated (no final showdown)
–	Contestant received the most public votes

Weekly results per contestant
Contestant	Week 1		Week 2			Week 3		Week 4		Week 5		Quarter-Final		Semi-Final		Final		
Contestant	Part 1	Part 2	Part 1	Part 2	Return vote	Part 1	Part 2	Round 1	Round 2	Round 1	Round 2	Round 1	Round 2	Round 1	Round 2	Thursday	Friday	
Chiara Galiazzo	1st 42.37%	—N/a	—N/a	1st 49.53%	—N/a	1st 36.46%	—N/a	1st 37.37%	—N/a	1st 24.86%	—N/a	1st 31.28%	1st 31.66%	1st 35.85%	1st 38.26%	1st 40.49%	1st 56.21%	Winner; 74.61%
Ics	4th 13.89%	—N/a	3rd 17.11%	—N/a	—N/a	3rd 13.74%	—N/a	—N/a	1st 31.76%	2nd 15.24%	—N/a	3rd 15.85%	3rd 17.40%	2nd 18.69%	2nd 24.52%	2nd 24.21%	2nd 23.32%	Runner-up; 25.39%
Davide Merlini	—N/a	2nd 23.50%	—N/a	2nd 16.63%	—N/a	—N/a	1st 24.13%	3rd 17.97%	—N/a	4th 11.34%	—N/a	4th 12.79%	5th 14.89%	3rd 16.94%	3rd 20.72%	3rd 18.37%	3rd 20.47%	Eliminated (final)
Cixi	2nd 18.10%	—N/a	—N/a	3rd 12.99%	—N/a	—N/a	2nd 23.51%	2nd 20.14%	—N/a	5th 10.33%	—N/a	2nd 16.19%	2nd 18.71%	4th 15.64%	4th 16.49%	4th 16.92%	Eliminated (final)	
Daniele Coletta	3rd 16.76%	—N/a	1st 22.72%	—N/a	—N/a	4th 12.34%	—N/a	—N/a	4th 17.00%	7th 9.78%	1st 31.44%	5th 12.40%	4th 17.34%	5th 12.88%	—N/a	Eliminated (semi-final)		
Frères Chaos	—N/a	5th 12.08%	—N/a	5th 10.13%	—N/a	5th 11.87%	—N/a	—N/a	2nd 19.60%	3rd 12.94%	—N/a	6th 11.51%	—N/a	Eliminated (quarter-final)				
Nice	—N/a	1st 25.92%	2nd 21.47%	—N/a	—N/a	2nd 15.08%	—N/a	—N/a	3rd 19.23%	8th 5.72%	2nd 33.43%	Eliminated (Week 5)						
Yendry Fiorentino	—N/a	6th 11.48%	—N/a	4th 10.73%	—N/a	—N/a	4th 16.82%	4th 15.49%	—N/a	6th 9.79%	3rd 35.13%	Eliminated (Week 5)						
Romina Falconi	—N/a	4th 12.43%	5th 12.71%	—N/a	—N/a	—N/a	5th 16.41%	—N/a	5th 12.41%	Eliminated (Week 4)								
Donatella	—N/a	3rd 14.60%	4th 15.18%	—N/a	—N/a	—N/a	3rd 19.14%	5th 9.02%	—N/a	Eliminated (Week 4)								
Alessandro Mahmoud	Not in live shows				1st 32.70%	6th 10.53%	—N/a	Eliminated (Week 3)										
Akmé	5th 6.56%	—N/a	6th 10.81%	—N/a	—N/a	Eliminated (Week 2)												
Nicola Aliotta	6th 2.32%	—N/a	Eliminated (Week 1)															
Gaya Misrachi	Not in live shows				2nd 26.44%	Not returned (Week 2)												
Michele Grandinetti	Not in live shows				3rd 24.16%	Not returned (Week 2)												
Up3Side	Not in live shows				4th 16.71%	Not returned (Week 2)												
Final showdown	Nicola Aliotta, Yendry Fiorentino		Akmé, Frères Chaos			Romina Falconi, Alessandro Mahmoud		Donatella, Yendry Fiorentino	Daniele Coletta, Romina Falconi	Daniele Coletta, Nice		Frères Chaos, Davide Merlini		Daniele Coletta, Cixi		No final showdown or judges' vote: results will be based on public votes alone		
Judges' vote to eliminate																No final showdown or judges' vote: results will be based on public votes alone		
Arisa's vote	Nicola Aliotta		Akmé			Alessandro Mahmoud		Yendry Fiorentino	Daniele Coletta	Daniele Coletta		Davide Merlini		Daniele Coletta		No final showdown or judges' vote: results will be based on public votes alone		
Elio's vote	Nicola Aliotta		Akmé			Alessandro Mahmoud		Donatella	Romina Falconi	Daniele Coletta		Frères Chaos		Daniele Coletta		No final showdown or judges' vote: results will be based on public votes alone		
Morgan's vote	Nicola Aliotta		Akmé			Alessandro Mahmoud		Donatella	Daniele Coletta	Nice		Davide Merlini		Cixi		No final showdown or judges' vote: results will be based on public votes alone		
Ventura's vote	Yendry Fiorentino		Akmé			Romina Falconi		Yendry Fiorentino	Romina Falconi	Nice		Frères Chaos		Cixi		No final showdown or judges' vote: results will be based on public votes alone		
Eliminated	Nicola Aliotta; 3 of 4 votes Majority		Akmé; 4 of 4 votes Majority			Alessandro Mahmoud; 3 of 4 votes Majority		Donatella; 2 of 4 votes Deadlock	Romina Falconi; 2 of 4 votes Deadlock	Yendry Fiorentino; Public vote 35.13% to eliminate		Frères Chaos; 2 of 4 votes Deadlock		Daniele Coletta; 2 of 4 votes Deadlock		Cixi; Public vote 16,92% to save	Davide Merlini; Public vote 20,47% to save	Ics; Public vote 25,39% to win
Eliminated	Nicola Aliotta; 3 of 4 votes Majority		Akmé; 4 of 4 votes Majority			Alessandro Mahmoud; 3 of 4 votes Majority		Donatella; 2 of 4 votes Deadlock	Romina Falconi; 2 of 4 votes Deadlock	Nice; 2 of 4 votes Deadlock		Frères Chaos; 2 of 4 votes Deadlock		Daniele Coletta; 2 of 4 votes Deadlock		Cixi; Public vote 16,92% to save	Davide Merlini; Public vote 20,47% to save	Chiara Galiazzo; Public vote 74.61% to win

=== Live show details ===
==== Week 1 (18 October 2012) ====
- Celebrity performers: Francesca Michielin ("Distratto" and "Sola") and Robbie Williams ("Rock DJ"/"Let Me Entertain You" and "Candy")

Contestants' performances on the first live show
Part 1
Act	Order	Song	Result
Ics	1	"Get Up (I Feel Like Being a) Sex Machine"	Safe
Nicola Aliotta	2	"Io vivrò (senza te)"	Bottom two
Cixi	3	"You've Got the Love"	Safe
Akmé	4	"My Kind of Love"	Safe
Daniele Coletta	5	"Strange World"	Safe
Chiara Galiazzo	6	"Purple Rain"	Safe
Part 2
Act	Order	Song	Result
Donatella	7	"Timebomb"	Safe
Yendry Fiorentino	8	"Per sempre"	Bottom two
Romina Falconi	9	"Duel"	Safe
Davide Merlini	10	"A chi mi dice"	Safe
Frères Chaos	11	"Somebody That I Used to Know"	Safe
Nice	12	"L'ultima occasione"	Safe
Final showdown details
Act	Order	Songs	Result
Nicola Aliotta	13	"When I Get You Alone"	Eliminated
Nicola Aliotta	15	"I'm Outta Love" (a cappella)	Eliminated
Yendry Fiorentino	14	"Blue Jeans"	Safe
Yendry Fiorentino	16	"At Last" (a cappella)	Safe

Judges' votes to eliminate

- Simona Ventura: Yendry Fiorentino – backed her own act, Nicola Aliotta.
- Elio: Nicola Aliotta – backed his own act, Yendry Fiorentino.
- Arisa: Nicola Aliotta – found him too much scholastic in his way of singing.
- Morgan: Nicola Aliotta – felt he was not ready to be a popstar.

==== Week 2 (25 October 2012) ====
- Celebrity performers: Club Dogo ("Tutto ciò che ho" featuring Il Cile and "P.E.S." featuring Giuliano Palma)

Contestants' performances on the second live show
Part 1
Act	Order	Song	Result
Nice	1	"Lonely Boy"	Safe
Donatella	2	"Lamette"	Safe
Romina Falconi	3	"The Voice"	Safe
Daniele Coletta	4	"Madness"	Safe
Akmé	5	"Voglio vederti danzare"	Bottom two
Ics	6	"White Lines (Don't Don't Do It)"	Safe
Part 2
Act	Order	Song	Result
Yendry Fiorentino	7	"Call Me Maybe"	Safe
Chiara Galiazzo	8	"Over the Rainbow"	Safe
Frères Chaos	9	"Crystalised"	Bottom two
Davide Merlini	10	"Iris"	Safe
Cixi	11	"Tutto l'amore che ho"	Safe
Final showdown details
Act	Order	Songs	Result
Akmé	12	"Impressioni di settembre"	Eliminated
Akmé	14	"Hide and Seek" (a cappella)	Eliminated
Frères Chaos	13	"Rumour Has It"	Safe
Frères Chaos	15	"Mi sono innamorato di te" (a cappella)	Safe

Judges' votes to eliminate

- Arisa: Akmé – felt they were not ready to be popstars.
- Morgan: Akmé – was in line with the decision of their mentor.
- Ventura: Akmé – considered Frères Chaos particularly interesting.
- Elio was not required to vote because there was already a majority, but confirmed he would have eliminated Akmé.

Wildcard

Act	Order	Song	Result
Up3Side	1	"Svalutation"	Not returned
Alessandro Mahmoud	2	"Master Blaster (Jammin')"	Returned
Gaya Misrachi	3	"Run Baby Run"	Not returned
Michele Grandinetti	4	"Somebody to Love"	Not returned

==== Week 3 (1 November) ====
- Theme: Let's Band!
- Celebrity performers: Scissor Sisters ("Only the Horses") and One Direction ("Live While We're Young")

Contestants' performances on the third live show
Part 1
Act	Order	Song	Result
Chiara Galiazzo	1	"I Want to Hold Your Hand"	Safe
Daniele Coletta	2	"Tutti i miei sbagli"	Safe
Frères Chaos	3	"Little Talks"	Safe
Nice	4	"Eternità"	Safe
Alessandro Mamhoud	5	"Name and Number"	Bottom two
Ics	6	"21st Century Schizoid Man"	Safe
Part 2
Act	Order	Song	Result
Cixi	7	"Sing It Back"	Safe
Romina Falconi	8	"Rio"	Bottom two
Donatella	9	"Rocket"	Safe
Yendry Fiorentino	10	"Don't Speak"	Safe
Davide Merlini	11	"Vieni da me"	Safe
Final showdown details
Act	Order	Songs	Result
Alessandro Mamhoud	12	"Master Blaster (Jammin')"	Eliminated
Alessandro Mamhoud	14	"Come il sole all'improvviso" (a cappella)	Eliminated
Romina Falconi	13	"Bohemian Rhapsody"	Safe
Romina Falconi	15	"Llorando" (a cappella)	Safe

Judges' decisions to eliminate

- Ventura: Romina Falconi – backed her own act, Alessandro Mamhoud.
- Morgan: Alessandro Mahmoud – backed his own act, Romina Falconi.
- Elio: Alessandro Mahmoud – thought that Falconi could have more chances in the music business.
- Arisa: Alessandro Mahmoud – found Falconi more convincing in the final showdown.

==== Week 4 (8 November) ====
- Theme: Hell Factor (double elimination)
- Celebrity performers: Arisa ("Meraviglioso amore mio") and Emis Killa ("Parole di ghiaccio")

Contestants' performances on the fourth live show
Part 1
Act	Order	Song	Result
Donatella	1	"Maneater"	Bottom two
Cixi	2	"Turning Tables"	Safe
Davide Merlini	3	"È l'amore che conta"	Safe
Chiara Galiazzo	4	"The Final Countdown"	Safe
Yendry Fiorentino	5	"Locked Out of Heaven"	Bottom two
Final showdown detail
Act	Order	Song	Result
Donatella	6	"Amore disperato"	Eliminated
Yendry Fiorentino	7	"If I Ain't Got You"	Safe
Part 2
Act	Order	Song	Result
Ics	8	"Der Kommissar"	Safe
Daniele Coletta	9	"Love Is a Losing Game"	Bottom two
Frères Chaos	10	"Ritual Union"	Safe
Nice	11	"White Rabbit"	Safe
Romina Falconi	12	"Il tempo se ne va"	Bottom two
Final showdown detail
Act	Order	Song	Result
Daniele Coletta	13	"I Can't Stand the Rain"	Safe
Romina Falconi	14	"Beautiful"	Eliminated

Judges' decisions to eliminate (Part 1)

- Arisa: Yendry Fiorentino – backed her own act, Donatella.
- Elio: Donatella – backed his own act, Yendry Fiorentino.
- Morgan: Donatella – recognized Yendry's superior voice.
- Ventura: Yendry Fiorentino – could not decide so chose to take it to deadlock.

With both acts receiving two votes each, the result went to deadlock and reverted to the earlier public vote. Donatella were eliminated as the act with the fewest public votes.

Judges' decisions to eliminate (Part 2)

- Ventura: Romina Falconi – backed her own act, Daniele Coletta.
- Morgan: Daniele Coletta – backed his own act, Romina Falconi.
- Arisa: Daniele Coletta – found Romina's voice more emotional.
- Elio: Romina Falconi – recognized Coletta's superiority in the performances.

With both acts receiving two votes each, the result went to deadlock and reverted to the earlier public vote. Falconi were eliminated as the act with the fewest public votes.

==== Week 5 (15 November) ====
- Theme: Hell Factor (double elimination)
- Celebrity performer: Malika Ayane ("Tre cose") and Alanis Morissette ("Guardian")

Contestants' performances on the fifth live show
Round 1
Act	Order	Song	Result
Yendry Fiorentino	1	"Tightrope"	Bottom three
Daniele Coletta	2	"Skyfall"	Bottom three
Ics	3	"Iodio"	Safe
Frères Chaos	4	"Enjoy the Silence"	Safe
Cixi	5	"Hai delle isole negli occhi"	Safe
Davide Merlini	6	"Can't Say No"	Safe
Nice	7	"Starlight"	Bottom three
Chiara Galiazzo	8	"I Was Made for Lovin' You"	Safe
Round 2
Act	Order	Song	Result
Yendry Fiorentino	9	"What the World Needs Now Is Love"	Eliminated
Daniele Coletta	10	"I Don't Want to Miss a Thing"	Showdown
Nice	11	"Cry Baby"	Showdown
Final showdown detail
Act	Order	Song	Result
Daniele Coletta	12	"Ogni mio istante" (a cappella)	Safe
Nice	13	"Amore che vieni, amore che vai" (a cappella)	Eliminated

Judges' votes to eliminate

- Ventura: Nice – backed her own act, Daniele Coletta.
- Elio: Daniele Coletta – backed his own act, Nice.
- Arisa: Daniele Coletta – found Nice's voice extraordinary.
- Morgan: Nice – was not satisfied with Nice's performance of the night.

With both acts receiving two votes each, the result went to deadlock and reverted to the earlier public vote. Nice were eliminated as the act with the fewest public votes.

==== Week 6: Quarter-final (22 November) ====
- Group performance: "I Will Survive"
- Celebrity performer: Conor Maynard ("Turn Around")
- Theme: Dance performance (Round 1); Mentor's Choice (Round 2)

Contestants' performances on the sixth live show
Round 1
Act	Order	Song	Result
Ics	1	"Malarazza"	Safe
Davide Merlini	2	"Apologize"	Bottom two
Frères Chaos	3	"Pensiero stupendo"	Safe
Cixi	4	"La solitudine"	Safe
Daniele Coletta	5	"Sei nell'anima"	Safe
Chiara Galiazzo	6	"Alabama Song"	Safe
Round 2
Act	Order	Songs	Result
Daniele Coletta	7	"Walk"	Safe
Cixi	8	"Right to Be Wrong"	Safe
Chiara Galiazzo	9	"You Do Something to Me"	Safe
Frères Chaos	10	"Inside World"	Bottom two
Ics	11	"Vengo anch'io. No, tu no"	Safe
Final showdown detail
Act	Order	Song	Result
Davide Merlini	12	"Vivimi"	Safe
Davide Merlini	14	"I Still Haven't Found What I'm Looking For" (a cappella)	Safe
Frères Chaos	13	"Somebody That I Used to Know"	Eliminated
Frères Chaos	15	"Nel blu dipinto di blu" (a cappella)	Eliminated

Judges' decisions to eliminate

- Ventura: Frères Chaos – backed her own act, Davide Merlini.
- Arisa: Davide Merlini – backed her own act, Fréres Chaos.
- Morgan: Davide Merlini – found Fréres Chaos strongly communicative.
- Elio: Frères Chaos – did not appreciate their style.

With both acts receiving two votes each, the result went to deadlock and reverted to the earlier public vote. Frères Chaos were eliminated as the act with the fewest public votes.

==== Week 7: Semi-final (29 November) ====
- Group performance: "Your Song" (with Mika)
- Celebrity performer: Mika ("Grace Kelly" and "Underwater")
- Theme: Previously unreleased songs (Round 1); Mentor's Choice (Round 2)

Contestants' performances on the seventh live show
Round 1
Act	Order	Song	Writers	Result
Davide Merlini	1	"100 000 parole d'amore"	Max Pezzali, Fabio Ilacqua and Luca Chiaravalli	Safe
Ics	2	"L'autostima di prima mattina"	Ics and Morgan	Safe
Cixi	3	"Non sono l'unica"	Bungaro and Cesare Chiodo	Safe
Daniele Coletta	4	"Un giorno in più"	Gavin DeGraw, Mario Cianchi and Marco Valicelli	Bottom two
Chiara Galiazzo	5	"Due respiri"	Eros Ramazzotti, Luca Chiaravalli and Saverio Grandi	Safe
Round 2
Act	Order	Song		Result
Chiara Galiazzo	6	"L'amore è tutto qui"		Safe
Cixi	7	"The Message"		Bottom two
Davide Merlini	8	"In un giorno qualunque"		Safe
Ics	9	"The Invisible Man"		Safe
Final showdown detail
Act	Order	Song		Result
Daniele Coletta	10	"21 Guns"		Eliminated
Daniele Coletta	12	"Sono solo parole" (a cappella)		Eliminated
Cixi	11	"Turning Tables"		Safe
Cixi	13	"Nobody's Perfect" (a cappella)		Safe

Judges' votes to eliminate

- Ventura: Cixi – backed her own act, Daniele Coletta.
- Elio: Daniele Coletta – backed his own act, Cixi.
- Arisa: Daniele Coletta – loved Cixi's voice.
- Morgan: Cixi – preferred Coletta.

With both acts receiving two votes each, the result went to deadlock and reverted to the earlier public vote. Danielle Coletta was eliminated as the act with the fewest public votes.

==== Week 8: Final (6/7 December) ====
6 December

- Group performance: "Who Knew"/"Stand by Me"/"The Edge of Glory"/"I Will Always Love You" (all X Factor acts)
- Theme: "My song" (own choice); tribute to Lucio Dalla; previously unreleased songs
- Celebrity performer: Kylie Minogue ("Can't Get You Out of My Head"), DJ Fish

Contestants' performances on the eighth live show
Single round
Act	Order	"My song"	Order	Drum and bass song	Order	Unreleased Song	Result
Cixi	1	"You Need Me, I Don't Need You"	8	"Il cielo"	11	"Non sono l'unica"	Eliminated
Chiara Galiazzo	2	"Teardrop"	7	"Quale allegria"	9	"Due respiri"	Safe
Davide Merlini	3	"Spaccacuore"	5	"Futura"	10	"100 000 parole d'amore"	Safe
Ics	4	"Smooth Criminal"	6	"Come è profondo il mare"	12	"L'autostima di prima mattina"	Safe

7 December

- Group performance: "Terra promessa"/"We Will Rock You"
- Theme: Celebrity duets (part 1), previously unreleased songs, "Best of" (3-songs medley) and "a cappella" performance (part 2)
- Celebrity performer: Eros Ramazzotti ("Un angelo disteso al sole") and Skye Edwards ("Featherlight")

Contestants' performances on the final live show
Part 1
Act	Order	Song			Result
Davide Merlini	1	"Rome Wasn't Built in a Day" (with Skye Edwards)			Third place
Chiara Galiazzo	2	"Stardust" (with Mika)			Safe
Ics	3	"What'll I Do" (with Lisa Hannigan)			Safe
Part 2
Act	Order	Songs			Result
Chiara Galiazzo	1	"Due respiri"	"Over the Rainbow"/"The Final Countdown"/"You Do Something to Me"	"Shake It Out" (a cappella)	Winner
Ics	2	"L'autostima di prima mattina"	"Der Kommissar"/"Iodio"/"Malarazza"	"Schegge di ruggine" (a cappella)	Runner-up

Best performance award

During the final live show, Cixi was awarded for the most innovative and spectacular performance ("You've Got the Love", Live Show 1); the contenders were the top six acts, and the performances were arbitrarily chosen by the production members and the main sponsor Enel. They were voted through a free-poll, on the official website; On December 6, the less two voted contendants (Fréres Chaos and Davide Merlini) were excluded from the competition.

Act	Performance	Live Show	Result
Cixi	"You've Got the Love"	1	Winner
Daniele Coletta	"Strange World"	1	Bottom five
Chiara Galiazzo	"Over the Rainbow"	2	Bottom five
Ics	"Iodio"	5	Bottom five
Fréres Chaos	"Somebody That I Used to Know"	1	Bottom two
Davide Merlini	"Can't Say No"	5	Bottom two
