= Due respiri =

Single by Chiara Galiazzo

from the album Due respiri
- Released: 8 December 2012
- Genre: Pop
- Length: 3:23
- Label: Sony Music Italy
- Songwriters: Eros Ramazzotti, Luca Chiaravalli, Saverio Grandi

Chiara Galiazzo singles chronology
"Due respiri" (2012)	"Il futuro che sarà" (2013)

Music video
- "Due respiri" on YouTube

"Due respiri" is a song written by Eros Ramazzotti, Luca Chiaravalli and Saverio Grandi and recorded by Italian singer Chiara Galiazzo. The song was released as Chiara's debut single on 8 December 2012, immediately after she won the sixth series of talent show X Factor.

The song debuted at number one on the Italian Top Digital Downloads, spending three weeks atop the chart, and it was later certified double platinum by the Federation of the Italian Music Industry.

== Background ==
"Due respiri" was written by Eros Ramazzotti, Luca Chiaravalli and Saverio Grandi. According to Chiaravalli, Ramazzotti decided to compose a song for Chiara immediately after hearing her during the first live show of the sixth series of X Factor. He started to write the song from a piano riff. He later asked Chiaravalli and Grandi to continue working on the song, and they wrote its lyrics in their studio in Gallarate, in Lombardy. Finally, Ramazzotti completed the song, and Chiara contributed modifying the second verse of the song. In an interview to TGCOM, Chiara also revealed that three different versions of the song exist, and that the one she performed was adapted for her by her X Factor mentor, Morgan.

The song's lyrics refer to an indissoluble relationship, and Chiara decided to dedicate it to music, explaining that for her "there's nothing like you [music]", as the chorus says.

== Live performances ==
Chiara performed the song for the first time on 29 November 2012, during the semifinal of the sixth series of X Factor. "Due respiri" was also the first Italian-language song she performed during the show. After receiving positive comments by the four judged, Chiara advanced to the final. On 1 December 2012, while she was still a contestant of the show, Chiara gave her first concert in her hometown, Padua, where she performed "Due respiri", as well as covers of popular songs by other artists. During the final, which was held on 6 and 7 December 2012, Galiazzo performed the song two additional times, before being announced as the winner of the competition. Galiazzo also performed the song during her 2013 Un posto nel mondo tour, both as part of the set list and as an encore.

== Music video ==
The music video for the song was shot in Rome on 12 December 2012 and directed by Marco Salom. The video was first broadcast by Sky Uno on 20 December 2012. In an interview released to Italian magazine Vanity Fair, Galiazzo explained that the music video is "bizarre, fairy, in the style of Tim Burton. [It was shot] on the seaside and it was very cold. In that story, there's me and my soul". The music video shows Chiara walking on the beach, and later entering a car which she drives through the seaside. The video also includes additional characters, including a female model performing classical ballet while playing violin, as well as girls using fire bolas or wearing a clown costume, and young women playing the piano or drum.

== Charts ==
Weekly chart performance for "Due respiri"
Chart (2012)	Peak position
Italy (FIMI)	1

=== Year-end charts ===
Year-end chart performance for "Due respiri"
Chart (2012)	Rank
Italy (FIMI)	34
