= Chiara Galiazzo =

Italian singer (born 1986)

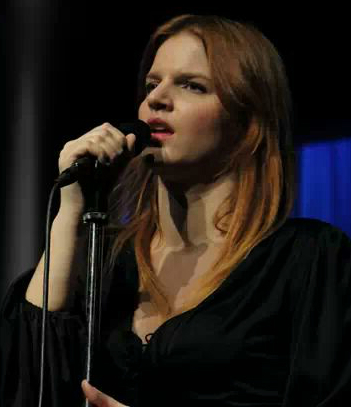
- Chiara Galiazzo (2014)

Background information
- Born: 12 August 1986 (age 40); Padua, Italy
- Genres: Pop, indie pop
- Occupation: Singer
- Instrument: Vocals
- Years active: 2012–present
- Labels: Sony Music (2012-2022); Artist First (2022); Not for All Management/The Orchard (2024-2025); Altafonte Italia (2025-2026); Ballandi Music/Sony (2026-)
- Website: chiaraofficial.it

Chiara Galiazzo (Italian pronunciation: [ˈkjaːra ɡaˈljattso]; born 12 August 1986) is an Italian singer. She rose to fame in 2012, after winning the sixth season of the Italian talent show X Factor. Her debut single, titled "Due respiri" and co-written by Eros Ramazzotti, was released on 8 December 2012 and debuted atop the Italian Singles Chart. Chiara released her first studio album, Un posto nel mondo, which debuted at number 2 on the Italian Albums Chart, and spawned the singles "Il futuro che sarà", "Mille passi" and "Vieni con me". In November of the same year, Galiazzo featured on Mika's single "Stardust", which became a number-one hit in Italy.

She performed three times at the Sanremo Music Festival: in 2013, 2015, and 2017.

== Early life ==
The elder of two sisters, Chiara Galiazzo was born in Padua on 12 August 1986 to Margherita and Francesco Galiazzo. She spent her childhood in Saonara, in the Province of Padua. After high school, she moved to Milan, where she studied economics at the Università Cattolica del Sacro Cuore, living with her sister and two friends. She graduated in April 2012, and she subsequently started an internship as a trader assistant in a financial services company.

Despite being interested in music since she was a child, she has never taken singing lessons. In 2008 she auditioned for the eighth series of the Italian talent show Amici di Maria De Filippi, but failed to qualify for the competition. Two years later, she entered the music academy Centro Professione Musica in Milan. In 2011, Galiazzo also auditioned for the fifth series of the Italian version of X Factor, but she was eliminated during the pre-selections, before she had the opportunity to perform in front of the four judges.

== Music career ==
=== 2012: X Factor ===
In May 2012, Galiazzo successfully performed during the pre-selections of the sixth season of the Italian version of X Factor. In June of the same year, she performed Massive Attack's "Teardrop" in front of the four judges. She advanced to the bootcamp, where she gave a rendition of Amy Winehouse's "Back to Black", as part of a group performance together with other contestants. It was later revealed that her category, soloists aged 25 and over, would be mentored by singer-songwriter Morgan. After singing Florence and the Machine's "Shake It Out", she was chosen by Morgan as one of the three finalists of his category. During the live shows, Galiazzo performed international hits such as Prince's "Purple Rain", Judy Garland's "Over the Rainbow", The Beatles' "I Want to Hold Your Hand", a tango version of Europe's "The Final Countdown", and "I Was Made for Lovin' You" by Kiss. On 29 November 2012, she also performed her eventual winner's single, "Due respiri", penned by Italian singer-songwriter Eros Ramazzotti together with Luca Chiaravalli and Saverio Grandi.

She advanced to the final of the competition without ever being in the bottom two. During the final, which was held in two consecutive nights for the first time in Italy, she also dueted with British singer Mika, singing "Stardust" from his album The Origin of Love. On 7 December 2012, she was announced the winner of the competition. During the final round, she beat the runner-up Ics for 718,658 televotes to 244,564. As a result, she received a recording contract with Sony Music Italy as a prize, with a stated value of €300,000.

Her winner's single, "Due respiri", was released to Italian radio stations and as a digital download on 8 December 2012, together with the singles of the remaining top four contestants. The song debuted at the number one on the Italian Top Digital Download chart of the week ending on 9 December 2012, despite being released only two days earlier. A digital EP with the same title was also released on the day after the final of the X Factor, also including the studio versions of four covers previously performed during the show. The EP was released as a CD on 11 December 2012.

=== 2013: Sanremo Music Festival and Un posto nel mondo ===
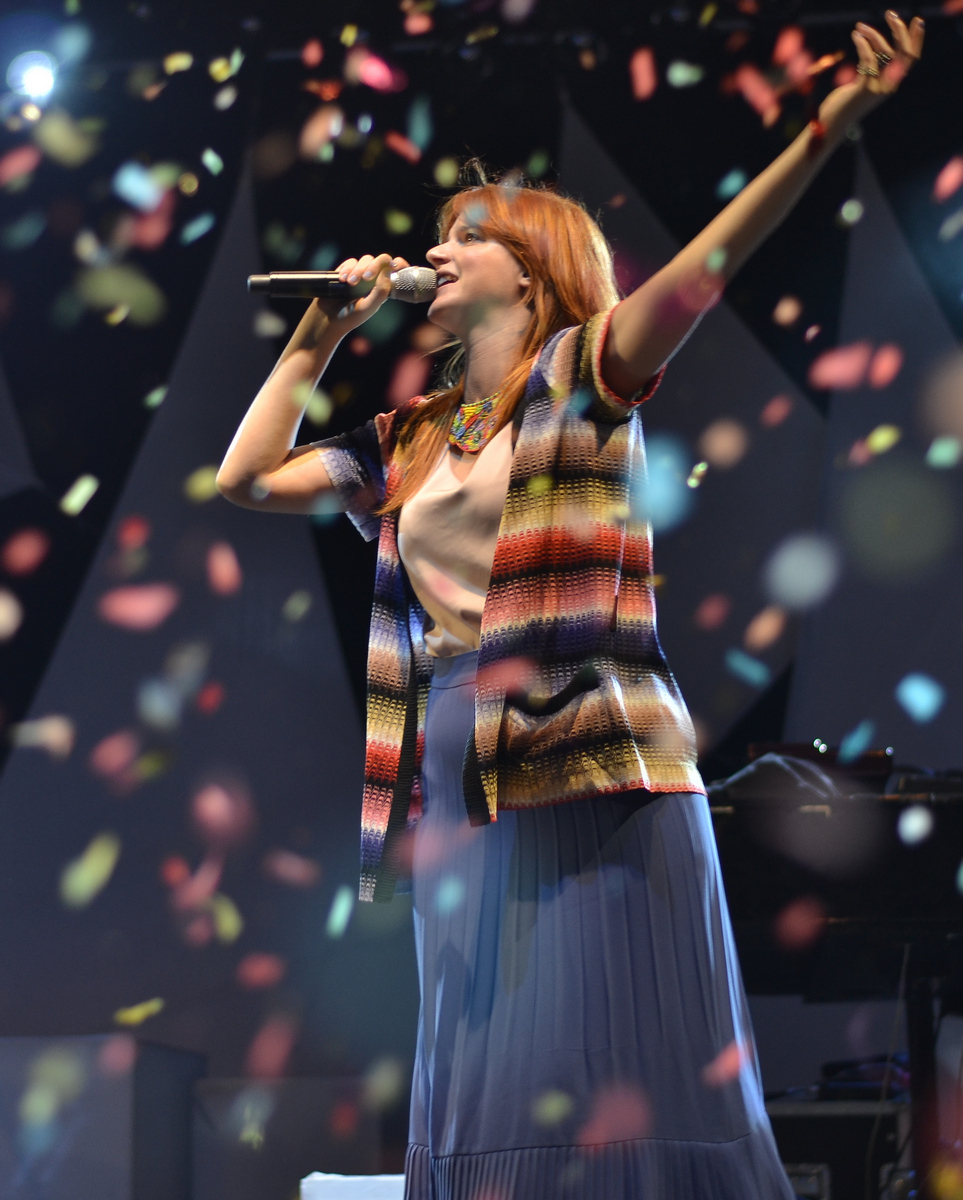
Chiara Galiazzo in concert in Bellaria (2013)

On 13 December 2012, Fabio Fazio announced that Chiara Galiazzo was chosen as one of the contestants of the 63rd Sanremo Music Festival, competing in the "Big Artists" section with the songs "L'esperienza dell'amore" and "Il futuro che sarà", written by Tiromancino's leader Federico Zampaglione and Baustelle's frontman Francesco Bianconi, respectively. During the first night of the competition, "Il futuro che sarà" was chosen as her entry for the remaining part of the competition, beating "L'esperienza dell'amore" with 60.25% of votes. During the final, held on 16 February 2013, Chiara was eliminated at the end of the first round, finishing eighth in a field of fourteen.

"Il futuro che sarà" was released to Italian radio stations on 13 February 2013 as the lead single from Chiara's debut album, Un posto nel mondo, also including "Due respiri" and "L'esperienza dell'amore". The album, which spent two weeks at number two on the Italian Albums Chart, spawned two additional single—"Mille passi", recorded as a duet with Italian singer Fiorella Mannoia, and "Vieni con me". In order to promote the album, Chiara embarked on the Un posto nel mondo tour, which debuted on 21 May 2013 in Crema, Lombardy.

Starting from April 2013, Chiara appeared in several TV spots for Telecom Italia, as part of the campaign "Comunicare è condividere", while in September of the same year she was chosen as one of the ambassadors for the Expo 2015. In July 2013, Galiazzo posted a picture on her Facebook account showing her in a recording studio in London with British singer Mika, hinting she was working with him on a collaborative song. The song was later revealed to be a duet version of Mika's "Stardust", which was included on his compilation album Songbook Vol. 1 and released as a single to Italian radio stations on 7 Novembre 2013 and as a digital download on 12 November 2013. The single peaked at number one on the Italian Top Digital Downloads chart for five non-consecutive weeks, and it was certified triple platinum for sales exceeding 90,000 units.

=== 2014–present: Un giorno di sole, Nessun posto è casa mia and new projects ===
Since early 2014, Chiara started working on her second studio album, together with authors including former La Fame di Camilla's frontman Ermal Meta and X Factor contestant Daniele Magro. Titled Un giorno di sole, the album was released by Sony Music Italy on 7 October 2014. The title-track was released as the set's lead single on 5 September 2014, while "Il rimedio, la vita e la cura" was released on 31 October 2014 as its second single. A new edition of the album, titled Un giorno di sole straordinario, was released on 12 February 2015. The new version includes the track "Straordinario", selected to compete in the Sanremo Music Festival 2015. "Straordinario" placed fifth in the main competition and became a top-ten hit in Italy. In Autumn 2015, Galiazzo also became a judge on the Italian talent show Ti lascio una canzone, with Lorella Cuccarini, Fabrizio Frizzi and the music composer Massimiliano Pani.

In December 2016, it was announced that Chiara would compete in Sanremo Music Festival 2017, performing the song "Nessun posto è casa mia". The song was included in the album with the same name, produced by Mauro Pagani, which was released on 24 February 2017. The album peaked at number ten and was promoted by the second single "Fermo immagine", written by the same singer together with Edwin Roberts and Stefano Marletta.

On 26 April 2019, after a year of artistic silence, the singer returned to the musical scenes with the single "Pioggia viola", made with the vocal participation of the rapper J-Ax. At the meantime the artist has embarked on a new tour called Il tour più piccolo del mondo, consisting of only four stages in Italy. On 29 October 2019 the single "Magnifico donare", written by Virginio, was published. It is the soundtrack for the homonymous advertising campaign promoted by Italian Blood Volunteers Association (AVIS), aimed at raising awareness on the importance of blood donation. Then, on 22 November, the single "L'ultima canzone del mondo" entered into radio rotation. The song sees among the authors the signature of the songwriter Mahmood.

== Discography ==
=== Studio albums ===
List of studio albums, with chart positions and certifications
Title	Album details	Peak chart positions	Certifications
Title	Album details	ITA	Certifications
Un posto nel mondo	Released: 13 February 2013; Label: Sony Music Italy; Formats: Download, CD	2	FIMI: Gold
Un giorno di sole	Released: 7 October 2014; Label: Sony Music Italy; Formats: Download, CD	4	
Nessun posto è casa mia	Released: 24 February 2017; Label: Sony Music Italy; Formats: Download, CD	10	
Bonsai	Released: 30 July 2020; Label: Sony Music Italy; Formats: Download, CD	41	

=== Extended plays ===
List of extended plays, with chart positions and certifications
Title	EP details	Peak chart positions	Certifications
Title	EP details	ITA	Certifications
Due respiri	Released: 8 December 2012; Label: Sony Music Italy; Formats: download, CD	—	

=== Singles ===
==== As lead artist ====
List of singles, with chart positions, album name and certifications
Single	Year	Peak chart positions	Certifications	Album or EP
Single	Year	ITA	Certifications	Album or EP
"Due respiri"	2012	1	FIMI: 2× Platinum	Due respiri
"Il futuro che sarà"	2013	16		Un posto nel mondo
"Mille passi" (feat. Fiorella Mannoia)	2013	28		Un posto nel mondo
"Vieni con me"	2013	28		Un posto nel mondo
"Un giorno di sole"	2014	73	FIMI: Gold	Un giorno di sole
"Il rimedio, la vita e la cura"	2014	—		Un giorno di sole
"Straordinario"	2015	7	FIMI: Platinum	Un giorno di sole straordinario
"Siamo adesso"	2015	—		Un giorno di sole straordinario
"Nessun posto è casa mia"	2017	34		Nessun posto è casa mia
"Fermo immagine"	2017	—		Nessun posto è casa mia
"Buio e luce"	2017	—		Nessun posto è casa mia
"Pioggia viola" (featuring J-Ax)	2019	—		Bonsai
"L'ultima canzone del mondo"	2019	—		Bonsai
"Honolulu"	2020	—		Bonsai
"Non avevano ragione i Maya"	2020	—		Bonsai
"Un'estate fa"	2022	—		none
"Istanti" (with I Desideri)	2024	—		none
"Di nuovo tu"	2024	—		none
"Valore"	2025	—		none

==== As featured artist ====
List of singles, with chart positions, album name and certifications
Single	Year	Peak chart positions	Certifications	Album or EP
Single	Year	ITA	Certifications	Album or EP
"Stardust" (Mika feat. Chiara)	2013	1	FIMI: 4× Platinum	Songbook Vol. 1
"Allora no!"(Rocco Hunt feat. Chiara)	2015	–		SignorHunt
"Nati così" (J Ax feat. Chiara)	2015	–		Il bello d'esser brutti
"Don't Go Breaking My Heart "(Giuliano Palma feat. Chiara)	2016	–		Groovin'
"Follow the Summer" (Paco Wurz feat. Chiara)	2016	–		none
"Sailor Moon" (Cristina D'Avena feat. Chiara)	2017	–		Duets - Tutti cantano Cristina
"Gravity" (Leo Stannard feat. Chiara Galiazzo)	2018	–		none
"Isola di città" (Space One feat. Chiara Galiazzo)	2019	–		none
"Waiting" (DJ Spada feat. Chiara Galiazzo)	2021	–		none
"Salsedine" (Marco Guazzone feat. Chiara Galiazzo)	2023	–		none
"Domani" (ENRI feat. Chiara Galiazzo)	2024	–		none

=== Other charted songs ===
List of non-single releases which entered the charts, with year released, and chart positions
Song	Year	Peak chart positions	Certifications	Album or EP
Song	Year	ITA	Certifications	Album or EP
"I Was Made for Lovin' You"	2012	15		—
"Over the Rainbow"	2012	11	FIMI: Gold	Due respiri
"I Want to Hold Your Hand"	2012	34		Due respiri
"L'amore è tutto qui"	2012	49		Due respiri
"The Final Countdown"	2012	6		Due respiri

=== Album appearances ===
List of other album appearances
Contribution	Year	Album
"White Christmas"	2014	X Factor Christmas 2014
"Allora no!" (Rocco Hunt feat. Chiara)	2015	SignorHunt
"Don't Go Breaking My Heart" (Giuliano Palma feat. Chiara)	2016	Groovin'
"Sailor Moon" (Cristina D'Avena feat. Chiara)	2017	Duets - Tutti cantano Cristina
"Free Your Heart" "If I Could (Feel Alive)" "Hold True" "Pull Me"	2021	Un passo dal cielo - I guardiani Official soundtrack by TV series (Andrea Guerra feat. Chiara Galiazzo and others)

=== Music videos ===
Title	Year	Director(s)
"Due respiri"	2012	Marco Salom
"Il futuro che sarà"	2013	Luca Tartaglia
"Mille passi"	2013	Gaetano Morbioli
"Vieni con me"	2013	Alessandro D'Alatri
"L'esperienza dell'amore"	2013	Gaetano Morbioli
"Un giorno di sole"	2014	Marco Salom
"Il rimedio, la vita e la cura"	2014	Marco Salom
"Straordinario"	2015	Paolo Marchione
"Siamo adesso"	2015	Mauro Russo
"Nessun posto è casa mia"	2017	Tiziano Russo
"Fermo immagine"	2017	Tiziano Russo
"Buio e luce"	2017	Tiziano Russo
"Pioggia viola"	2019	Fabrizio Conte
"Magnifico donare"	2019	Alessandro Guida e Daniele Barbiero
"L'ultima canzone del mondo"	2019	Felipe Conceicao
"Salsedine"	2023	Maxim Derevianko

== Awards and nominations ==
Year	Award	Nomination	Work	Result
2013	Nickelodeon Kids' Choice Awards	Best Italian Singer	Herself	Nominated
2013	MTV Awards	Pepsi Best New Artist	Herself	Nominated
2013	Medimex Awards	Best Tour by an Emerging Artist	Un posto nel mondo tour	Nominated
2013	Wind Music Awards	Multiplatinum Digital Song Award	"Due respiri"	Won
2014	Rockol Awards	Italian Revelation of the Year	Herself	Won
2019	Lunezia Awards	Best Album	Nessun posto è casa mia	Won
2022	Award from the Italian Cultural Institute of Los Angeles	Contributions for the promotion of the Italian language and culture in the world	Herself	Won
2023	Special award from the Italian Red Cross	Heart of the Red Cross for philanthropy ("commitment always demonstrated in favor of most vulnerable people")	Herself	Won

Awards and achievements
Preceded by Francesca Michielin	Italian X Factor; Winner; 2012	Succeeded by Michele Bravi
