= The Boy Who Knew Too Much (album) =

Studio album by Mika
- Released: 21 September 2009
- Recorded: June 2008–2009
- Studios: Capitol Studios (Los Angeles, California); Olympic Studios (London, England); Rocket Carousel Studio (Los Angeles, California)
- Genres: Power pop; glam pop
- Length: 41:06
- Labels: Casablanca; Universal Republic
- Producers: Greg Wells; Imogen Heap; Mika; RedOne

Mika chronology
Songs for Sorrow (2009)	The Boy Who Knew Too Much (2009)	The Origin of Love (2012)

Singles from The Boy Who Knew Too Much
- 1. "We Are Golden" Released: 7 September 2009; 2. "Rain" Released: 23 November 2009; 3. "Blame It on the Girls" Released: 15 February 2010

The Boy Who Knew Too Much is the second studio album by British singer-songwriter Mika. It was released on 21 September 2009, under Casablanca/Universal Republic in the United States and Island in the United Kingdom.

== Background ==
Mika worked with producer Greg Wells, who also produced his debut album Life in Cartoon Motion. The album was written in Olympic Studios, London, which began in June 2008. In September 2008 he moved to Rocket Carousel Studios, Los Angeles, where the album was recorded. Mika has described the album's themes as dealing with his teenage years, and "in a sense is kind of part two" of his first album. In contrast to his first album, which "contained innocent fairytales", Mika pitches the new album's songs as "gothic Tim Burton-esque fantasies."

The album was originally titled We Are Golden after the first single from the album, "We Are Golden". On 20 July 2009 in an on-air interview with DJ Jo Whiley on BBC Radio 1, Mika revealed he was considering renaming the album, because he wanted "something a little more ridiculous." On 6 August 2009 it was confirmed that the album's title would change to The Boy Who Knew Too Much. As with Mika's debut album Life in Cartoon Motion, the album artwork has been designed by Mika's sister (who works under the nom de plume DaWack), the Australian illustrator Sophie Blackall, Airside collaborator Richard Hogg and Mika himself. The artwork has been inspired by children's picture books from the 1940s to 1970s.

== Critical response ==
Professional ratings
Aggregate scores
Source	Rating
Metacritic	70/100
Review scores
Source	Rating
AllMusic	4/5 stars
The A.V. Club	A−
Entertainment Weekly	A
The Guardian	3/5 stars
Los Angeles Times	3/4 stars
The Observer	3/5 stars
PopMatters	8/10 stars
Rolling Stone	3/5 stars
Slant	1.5/5 stars
Spin	3.5/5 stars
The Times	3/5 stars

The album received generally positive reviews from music critics, based on an aggregate score of 70/100 from Metacritic.

== Singles ==
- "We Are Golden" was the first single from the album. It received its UK radio debut on BBC Radio 2 on 20 July 2009. It peaked at number 4 on the UK Singles Chart.
- "Rain" was the second UK and German single, released on 23 November 2009 in both digital and physical format. It peaked at number 72 on the UK Singles Chart, making it Mika's first UK single to miss the top 40. In Germany it peaked at number 56. It was released as the third UK single, on 15 February 2010.
- "Blame It on the Girls" was the second American and Japanese single from the album. It peaked at number one in Japan but failed to make any impact in the United States. It was released as the third UK single, on 15 February 2010. It peaked at number 72.
- The song "Good Gone Girl" charted within the Romanian Top 100 on airplay only, without being released as a single.

== Track listing ==
Standard edition
No.	Title	Writer(s)	Length
1.	"We Are Golden"	Mika	3:58
2.	"Blame It on the Girls"	Mika	3:34
3.	"Rain"	Mika, Jodi Marr	3:43
4.	"Dr. John"	Mika	3:44
5.	"I See You"	Mika, Walter Afanasieff	4:17
6.	"Blue Eyes"	Mika	2:50
7.	"Good Gone Girl"	Mika, Jodi Marr	3:02
8.	"Touches You"	Mika	3:19
9.	"By the Time"	Mika, Imogen Heap	3:21
10.	"One Foot Boy"	Mika, Rob Davis	2:58
11.	"Toy Boy"	Mika, Jodi Marr	2:56
12.	"Pick Up Off the Floor"	Mika	3:24

Deluxe edition bonus tracks
No.	Title	Writer(s)	Length
13.	"Lady Jane"	Mika	3:20
14.	"Lover Boy"	Mika	3:13

Japanese edition bonus track
No.	Title	Writer(s)	Length
13.	"We Are Golden" (Acoustic)	Mika	3:08

Summer edition bonus tracks
No.	Title	Writer(s)	Length
13.	"Kick Ass (We Are Young)"	Mika, Jodi Marr, RedOne	3:12
14.	"Lover Boy"	Mika	3:13
15.	"Lady Jane"	Mika	3:20
16.	"Lonely Alcoholic"	Mika	3:08
17.	"Rain" (Acoustic)	Mika	3:06
18.	"Poker Face" (BBC Radio 1 Live Lounge Session)	Stefani Germanotta, Nadir Khayat	3:09
19.	"Satellite"	David J. Matthews	4:14
20.	"Ring Ring"	Mika	2:48

UK deluxe edition bonus disc: Mika: Live at Sadler's Wells
No.	Title	Writer(s)	Length
1.	"Grace Kelly"	Mika, Jodi Marr, John Merchant, Dan Warner	4:24
2.	"Lady Jane"	Mika	3:04
3.	"Stuck in the Middle"	Mika	6:06
4.	"Lonely Alcoholic"	Mika	3:17
5.	"Blue Eyes"	Mika	3:34
6.	"Toy Boy"	Mika, Jodi Marr	3:55
7.	"Billy Brown"	Mika	3:32
8.	"Good Gone Girl"	Mika, Jodi Marr	3:10
9.	"Over My Shoulder"	Mika	4:11
10.	"Big Girl (You Are Beautiful)"	Mika	4:12
11.	"Love Today"	Mika	3:45
12.	"Blame It on the Girls"	Mika	6:18
13.	"Happy Ending"	Mika	5:22
14.	"Lollipop"	Mika	7:08
15.	"My Interpretation"	Mika, Jodi Marr, Richie Supa	3:15
16.	"Rain"	Mika	5:07
17.	"Relax, Take It Easy"	Mika	5:38

American deluxe edition bonus DVD: The Boy Who Didn't Know Enough
No.	Title	Writer(s)	Length
1.	"We Are Golden" (The Making of the Video)	Mika	3:00
2.	"We Are Golden" (Video)	Mika	4:02
3.	"Making the Parc Des Princes Show" (Video)	Mika	15:00
4.	"Grace Kelly" (Live from Parc Des Princes)	Mika, Jodi Marr, John Merchant, Dan Warner	4:35
5.	"Lollipop" (Live from Parc Des Princes)	Mika	6:22
6.	"Love Today" (Live from Parc Des Princes)	Mika	7:08

Asian deluxe edition bonus disc: B-Sides & Rarities
No.	Title	Writer(s)	Length
1.	"Kick Ass (We Are Young)"	Mika, Jodi Marr, RedOne	3:14
2.	"We Are Golden" (Calvin Harris Remix)	Mika	6:58
3.	"Rain" (Benny Benassi Remix)	Mika	6:10
4.	"Blame It on the Girls" (Not on the Starsmith Remix)	Mika	6:53
5.	"Poker Face" (BBC Radio 1 Live Lounge Session)	Stefani Germanotta, Nadir Khayat	3:05
6.	"Kick Ass (We Are Young)" (Cutmore Remix)	Mika, Jodi Marr, RedOne	3:53
7.	"Relax, Take It Easy" (Ashley Beedle's Castro Vocal Discomix)	Mika	6:18
8.	"Grace Kelly" (Tom Neville Full Vocal Remix)	Mika, Jodi Marr, Dan Warner	9:03
9.	"Love Today" (Switch Remix)	Mika	5:31
10.	"Happy Ending" (Kleerup Mix)	Mika	6:31
11.	"Rain" (P Zombies Remix)	Mika	6:34

Summer deluxe edition bonus disc: The Best of Life in Cartoon Motion
No.	Title	Writer(s)	Length
1.	"Any Other World"	Mika	4:19
2.	"Grace Kelly"	Mika, Jodi Marr, Dan Warner	3:07
3.	"Lollipop"	Mika	3:03
4.	"My Interpretation"	Mika, Jodi Marr	3:35
5.	"Relax, Take It Easy"	Mika	3:44
6.	"Love Today"	Mika	3:55
7.	"Happy Ending" (The LA Edit)	Mika	3:54
8.	"Over My Shoulder"	Mika	4:45

== Personnel ==
- Mika – vocals, piano, keyboards, background vocals, background violin

Additional musicians

- Walter Afanasieff – percussion, keyboards
- The Andrae Crouch Choir – background vocals
- Lorna Bridge – background vocals
- Paul Buckmaster – strings
- Matt Chamberlain – drums, percussion
- Andrew Dermanis – additional vocals
- Gary Grant – horns
- Jerry Hey – horns
- Imogen Heap – drums, background vocals, keyboard
- Dan Higgins – horns
- Alex Millar – background vocals
- Audrey Moukataff – background vocals
- Chris Nicolaides – background vocals
- Cherisse Osei – drums
- Owen Pallett – violin
- Tim Pierce – guitar
- Fortune Penniman – background vocals
- Paloma Penniman – background vocals, additional vocals
- Zuleika Penniman – background vocals
- Bill Reichenbach Jr. – horns
- Dan Rothchild – bass guitar, background vocals
- Fabien Waltmann – keyboards
- Martin Waugh – guitar, background vocals
- Greg Wells – keyboards, drums, bass, percussion, guitar
- Ida Falk Winland – background vocals
- Lyle Workman – guitar

== Charts and certifications ==
=== Weekly charts ===
Chart (2009)	Peak position
Argentine Albums (CAPIF)	6
Australian Albums (ARIA)	10
Austrian Albums (Ö3 Austria)	9
Belgian Albums (Ultratop Flanders)	3
Belgian Albums (Ultratop Wallonia)	3
Canadian Albums (Billboard)	14
Danish Albums (Hitlisten)	24
Dutch Albums (Album Top 100)	5
French Albums (SNEP)	1
German Albums (Offizielle Top 100)	6
Greek Albums (IFPI Greece)	45
Irish Albums (IRMA)	14
Italian Albums (FIMI)	10
Mexican Albums (AMPROFON)	29
New Zealand Albums (RMNZ)	30
Norwegian Albums (VG-lista)	29
Portuguese Albums (AFP)	17
Spanish Albums (Promusicae)	7
Swedish Albums (Sverigetopplistan)	14
Swiss Albums (Schweizer Hitparade)	2
UK Albums (Official Charts)	4
US Billboard 200	19

=== Year-end charts ===
Chart (2009)	Position
Belgian Albums (Ultratop Flanders)	40
Belgian Albums (Ultratop Wallonia)	41
Dutch Albums (Album Top 100)	77
European Top 100 Albums (Billboard)	49
French Albums (SNEP)	12
Swiss Albums (Schweizer Hitparade)	60
UK Albums (OCC)	99

Chart (2010)	Position
French Albums (SNEP)	27

=== Certifications ===
Region	Certification	Certified units/sales
Canada (Music Canada)	Gold	40,000^{^}
Belgium (BRMA)	Platinum	30,000^{*}
France (SNEP)	3× Platinum	300,000^{*}
Italy (FIMI)	Platinum	70,000^{*}
Switzerland (IFPI Switzerland)	Gold	15,000^{^}
United Kingdom (BPI)	Platinum	300,000^{‡}
^{*} Sales figures based on certification alone.^{^} Shipments figures based on certification alone.^{‡} Sales+streaming figures based on certification alone.

== Release history ==
Country	Date
Hong Kong	5 September 2009
Netherlands	16 September 2009
France	18 September 2009
Australia	18 September 2009
Germany	18 September 2009
Italy	18 September 2009
Ireland	18 September 2009
United Kingdom	21 September 2009
Argentina	21 September 2009
Mexico	21 September 2009
South Korea	21 September 2009
United States	22 September 2009
Brazil	22 September 2009
Canada	22 September 2009
South Korea (Korean Special Edition)	27 May 2010
Hong Kong (Asia Tour Edition)	2 June 2010
South Korea (Asia Tour Edition)	15 June 2010
