= Live Parc des Princes Paris =

Video by Mika
- Released: 10 November 2008
- Recorded: 4 July 2008
- Venue: Parc des Princes
- Genres: Pop rock; glam rock; power pop
- Length: 145 minutes approx.
- Labels: Island Records; Universal Records; FMR; Warner Bros.
- Director: Russell Thomas
- Producer: Julie Jakobek

Mika chronology
Live in Cartoon Motion (2007)	Live Parc des Princes Paris (2008)

Live Parc des Princes Paris is the second live DVD by British singer-songwriter Mika. It is a one-off stadium show with a crowd of 55,000 recorded in Paris on 4 July 2008. The DVD also features a documentary following the initial idea of the show through to the production, directed by Joe Kane. In Bonus Features it includes the music video for the song "Lollipop", a live performance of "Grace Kelly" and the making-of the design and others in the show.

== Track listing ==
No.	Title	Writer(s)	Length
1.	"Intro"		2:30
2.	"Relax, Take It Easy"	Mika; Nicholas Eede	7:31
3.	"Big Girl (You Are Beautiful)"	Mika	12:57
4.	"My Interpretation"	Mika; Jodi Marr; Richie Supa	16:41
5.	"Billy Brown"	Mika	19:58
6.	"Holy Johnny"	Mika	25:41
7.	"Any Other World"	Mika	30:03
8.	"Ring Ring"	Mika; Marr	33:52
9.	"Stuck in the Middle"	Mika	41:24
10.	"Rain"	Mika; Marr	44:33
11.	"Just Can't Get Enough"	Vincent Clarke	50:15
12.	"Happy Ending"	Mika	55:11
13.	"Love Today"	Mika	1:06:06
14.	"Grace Kelly"	Mika; Dan Warner; John Merchant; Marr	1:10:21
15.	"Animal Play" (Teddy Bears' Picnic)	John W. Bratton	1:12:08
16.	"Lollipop"	Mika	1:17:59
17.	"Grace Kelly" (acoustic)	Mika; Warner; Merchant; Marr	1:21:21
18.	"Relax, Take It Easy" (rave)	Mika; Eede	1:29:25

Bonus features
No.	Title	Length
1.	"Making of the Parc des Princes Show" (documentary)
2.	"Lollipop" (video)
3.	"Grace Kelly" (live from Jools Holland's Hootenanny, 31 December 2007)

== Release and DVD information ==
The DVD was released on 10 November 2008 in the UK and Europe and 16 December 2008 in the US. . The DVD was available for pre-order since 21 October in several online stores. The official release date was confirmed on Mika's online blog; There he gave the cover and the video preview that can be seen on YouTube. It has been released on DVD in a standard case with a small booklet of art and photos and on Deluxe DVD with a hard cover and larger booklet of photos and artwork. It has also been released on Blu-ray, not like Mika's first video album which was only released in DVD.

The DVD includes subtitles in Dutch, English, French, German, Italian, Portuguese and Spanish.
