= Live in Cartoon Motion =

Video by Mika
- Released: 12 November 2007
- Recorded: 30 June 2007
- Venue: L'Olympia
- Genre: Pop rock; glam rock; power pop
- Label: Warner Reprise Video; FMR, Warner Bros.
- Director: Matt Askem
- Producer: Phillippa Pettett; Mike Mooney (exec.); Andy Holland (exec.)

Mika chronology
Live in Cartoon Motion (2007)	Live Parc des Princes Paris (2008)

Live in Cartoon Motion is the first live DVD by British singer-songwriter Mika. It is a recording of the French leg of his tour, at L'Olympia Paris on 30 June 2007. The DVD also features a documentary, all Mika video clips to date and extra TV performances.

== Track listing ==
No.	Title	Writer(s)	Length
1.	"Relax, Take It Easy"	Mika; Nicholas Eede
2.	"Big Girl (You Are Beautiful)"	Mika
3.	"My Interpretation"	Mika; Jodi Marr; Richie Supa
4.	"Billy Brown"	Mika
5.	"Any Other World"	Mika
6.	"Stuck in the Middle"	Mika
7.	"Ring Ring"	Mika; Marr
8.	"Sweet Dreams (Are Made of This)"	David A. Stewart; Annie Lennox
9.	"Holy Johnny"	Mika
10.	"Happy Ending"	Mika
11.	"I Want You Back"	Deke Richards; Berry Gordy Jr.; Alphonso Mizell; Freddie Perren
12.	"Love Today"	Mika
13.	"Grace Kelly"	Mika; Dan Warner; John Merchant; Marr
14.	"Lollipop"	Mika

Bonus features
No.	Title	Length
1.	"A Long Way From Home" (documentary)
2.	"Grace Kelly" (video)
3.	"Love Today" (video)
4.	"Big Girl (You Are Beautiful)" (video)
5.	"Relax, Take It Easy" (French version; video)
6.	"Happy Ending" (video)
7.	"Grace Kelly" (live at Later... with Jools Holland, 17 November 2006)
8.	"Everybody's Talkin'" (live)
9.	"Love Today" (live)

== Musicians ==
- Mika – vocals
- Mike Choi – bass, backing vocals
- Martin Waugh – guitar, backing vocals
- Luke Juby – keyboards, backing vocals
- Cherisse Osei – drums, backing vocals
- Lorna Bridge, Sandrinne Peyronnenc, Ali Richards – backing vocals
