= We Are Golden =

2009 single by Mika

Single by Mika

from the album The Boy Who Knew Too Much
- Released: 6 September 2009
- Genre: Glam rock; pop rock
- Length: 3:58 (album version); 3:30 (single edit)
- Label: Casablanca
- Songwriter: Mika
- Producers: Greg Wells; Mika

Mika singles chronology
"Lollipop" (2008)	"We Are Golden" (2009)	"Rain" (2009)

Music video
- "We Are Golden" on YouTube

"We Are Golden" is the first single from British-Lebanese singer Mika's second studio album, The Boy Who Knew Too Much. The song was produced and mixed by Greg Wells and features the gospel choir of Andraé Crouch.

== Release ==
The single premiered on radio airplay in the United Kingdom on 20 July 2009, on BBC Radio 2. It was made available for download on 14 August 2009 in Australia and on 6 September 2009 in the United Kingdom. It was released physically on 7 September 2009, along with the limited edition 7" and 12" gramophone records. In the United States, "We Are Golden" became available exclusively from Apple's iTunes Store for one week starting 18 August 2009.

== Description ==
In an interview with Q magazine, Mika stated:

["We Are Golden" is] big sounding and aggressive, but in a good way. It's got a gospel choir on it and a kids' choir, but unlike the first record they're not singing sweetly, they're screaming at the top of their lungs.

— Mika, Q Magazine

== Critical reception ==
The song received mixed and generally positive reviews.

"We Are Golden" is unlikely to change anyone's mind. It sounds like Jim Steinman doing High School Musical and features two varieties of choir – gospel and kiddie, in case you were wondering. Mika, meanwhile, flits in and out of falsetto whenever he fancies. What do we think? Well, the big old chorus makes his foibles worth putting up with... as long as we don't have to watch the video too.

— Nick Levine, Digital Spy.

== Music video ==
A frame from the "We Are Golden" music video.

The music video for "We Are Golden" was filmed on 9 July and 10 July 2009, at Elstree Studios. It was directed by Swedish director Jonas Åkerlund. The video premiered on 4 August 2009 in the United Kingdom on Channel 4. The video features Mika dancing around a bedroom in his underwear as a "celebration of all the years Mika spent dancing around his bedroom as a teenager."

== In other media ==
The song was featured in many TeenNick promos in fall 2009. It was also used in the television series, Make It or Break It.

In Malaysia, it was used for the kids@fgw promo which was shown in January 2010 on NTV7 and in the first episode of the television show Hellcats.

== Track listing ==
UK CD single

No.	Title	Length
1.	"We Are Golden"	3:59
2.	"We Are Golden" (Calvin Harris Remix) (Radio Edit)	3:34
3.	"Lonely Alcoholic"	3:05

UK digital download

No.	Title	Length
1.	"We Are Golden"	3:57
2.	"Blue Eyes" (Live From Sadler's Wells)	3:34

UK digital EP

No.	Title	Length
1.	"We Are Golden"	3:58
2.	"We Are Golden" (Calvin Harris Club Mix)	6:28
3.	"We Are Golden" (Mirwais Vocal Mix)	6:12
4.	"We Are Golden" (Don Diablo Dub)	6:11
5.	"We Are Golden" (Bob Sinclar's Big Room Remix)	6:38
6.	"We Are Golden" (Acoustic Version)	3:09

UK 12" single

No.	Title	Length
1.	"We Are Golden" (Calvin Harris Club Remix)
2.	"We Are Golden" (Calvin Harris Dub Remix)
3.	"We Are Golden" (Mirwais Dub Remix)
4.	"We Are Golden" (Don Diablo Vocal Remix)

UK 7" single

No.	Title	Length
1.	"We Are Golden"	3:58
2.	"We Are Golden" (Jokers of the Scene Remix)	8:10

German 2-track CD single

No.	Title	Length
1.	"We Are Golden"	3:58
2.	"We Are Golden" (Bob Sinclar's Big Room Remix)	6:38

German 4-track CD single

No.	Title	Length
1.	"We Are Golden"	3:59
2.	"We Are Golden" (Calvin Harris Remix) (Radio Edit)	3:34
3.	"Lonely Alcoholic"	3:05
4.	"We Are Golden" (Music Video)

Italian CD single

No.	Title	Length
1.	"We Are Golden"	3:58
2.	"We Are Golden" (Bob Sinclar's Big Room Remix)	6:38
3.	"We Are Golden" (Calvin Harris Remix) (Radio Edit)	3:34
4.	"We Are Golden" (Calvin Harris Club Mix)	6:28
5.	"We Are Golden" (Mirwais Vocal Mix)	6:12

== Chart performance ==
The single debuted on the UK singles chart at number four on 13 September 2009 before falling to number 11 on its second week. Despite becoming Mika's second top-five single, it was his shortest-lasting single at the time, spending only seven weeks in the top 100. The single was released in August in the United States but failed to chart on the Billboard Hot 100. In Italy, it peaked at number three and spent 18 weeks on the charts. It was certified gold by the Federazione Industria Musicale Italiana (FIMI).

=== Weekly charts ===
Chart (2009)	Peak position
Australian Singles Chart	10
Austrian Singles Chart	17
Belgian Singles Chart (Flanders)	9
Belgian Singles Chart (Wallonia)	7
Czech Airplay Chart	39
Dutch Singles Chart	20
Eurochart Hot 100 Singles	4
French Singles Chart	19
German Singles Chart	29
Hungarian Singles Chart	10
Irish Singles Chart	14
Israeli Singles Chart	8
Italian Singles Chart	3
Japan Hot 100	15
Norwegian Singles Chart	16
Romanian Top 100	71
Slovak Airplay Chart	26
Spanish Singles Chart	37
Spanish Airplay Chart	14
Spanish Physical Singles Chart	1
Swedish Singles Chart	30
Swiss Singles Chart	11
UK Singles Chart	4
US Billboard Hot Dance Club Play	5

=== Year-end charts ===
Chart (2009)	Position
Dutch Top 40	122
Italian Singles Chart	50
Japanese Adult Contemporary Chart	45
Romanian Top 100	54
UK Singles Chart	170

== Certifications ==
Region	Certification	Certified units/sales
Italy (FIMI)	Gold	10,000^{*}
United Kingdom (BPI)	Silver	200,000^{‡}
^{*} Sales figures based on certification alone.^{‡} Sales+streaming figures based on certification alone.

== Release history ==
Region	Date	Format
Australia	14 August 2009	Digital download
United States	18 August 2009	Digital download
United Kingdom, Ireland	20 July 2009	Radio airplay
United Kingdom, Ireland	6 September 2009	Digital download
United Kingdom, Ireland	7 September 2009	CD single
Italy	24 July 2009	Radio airplay

== Credits ==
- Mika – vocals, piano, keyboards, background vocals
- Greg Wells – keyboards, drums, bass, percussion, programming, guitar
- Tim Pierce – guitar
- Martin Waugh – additional guitar
- Audrey Moukataff – background vocals
- Fortune Penniman – background vocals
- Paloma Penniman – background vocals
- Zuleika Penniman – background vocals
- The Andraé Crouch Choir – background vocals
