= Blame It on the Girls =

Single by Mika

from the album The Boy Who Knew Too Much
- Released: 15 February 2010
- Recorded: 2008–2009
- Genre: Power pop; pop rock
- Length: 3:34 (album version); 3:18 (radio edit)
- Label: Casablanca
- Songwriter: Mika
- Producers: Greg Wells; Mika

Mika singles chronology
"Rain" (2009)	"Blame It on the Girls" (2010)	"Kick Ass (We Are Young)" (2010)

Music video
- "Blame It on the Girls" on YouTube

"Blame It on the Girls" is the third and final single released from singer-songwriter Mika's second studio album, The Boy Who Knew Too Much. The single was released on 15 February 2010. The song was produced and mixed by Greg Wells. It is also played in the credits of the film Monte Carlo.

== Description ==
In an interview with Q magazine, Mika says:

["Blame It on the Girls"] sounds like No Doubt. It's about a wealthy, handsome boy who has everything, yet pretends to be miserable.

— Mika, Q Magazine

The song was inspired by a well-dressed, good-looking man Mika and his sister saw walking down a street in London shouting down his phone. The song uses a musical technique called musique concrète in which the music is devised by using everyday objects to make sound. In this particular song, the beat is created by Mika hitting his desk, clapping his hands and stamping his feet.

== Notable live performances ==
In the United States, Mika performed the song on Good Morning America on 25 September, the Late Show with David Letterman on 14 October, and The Ellen DeGeneres Show on 22 October 2009. Mika also performed the song live numerous times around its release in the UK to help promote the song. He performed the song on So You Think You Can Dance on 30 January, as well as on Alan Carr: Chatty Man on the 11th, and on The Album Chart Show on Channel 4 on the 12th. He further performed the song on ITV1 three times in February: On the 5th he sang "Blame It on the Girls" and an operatic rendition of his other single "Rain" on Popstar to Operastar. On 18 February, Mika performed the song live on GMTV and made a final appearance on Movie Toons on the 27th to end his promotion of the single.

== Music video ==
A frame from the "Blame It on the Girls" music video.

The music video for "Blame It on the Girls" was directed by Nez Khammal. An unfinished version of the video premiered on 3 October 2009 in the United Kingdom on Channel 4. The video starts in black and white with Mika sitting on a chair, wearing a bowler hat and holding a cane whilst speaking a prologue to the song. As the music starts the video bursts into colour, showing three screens behind Mika, each showing him in alternate colours of pink and blue. The screen to the left and right break away as female dancers dressed in half a tuxedo and half an orange dress dance into shot. As the chorus ends, the dancers disappear and Mika is seen sitting in a large sofa, he then gets up and moves over to a maze of mirrors, and then the girls join him again once the second chorus begins. The video is set in a film studio dressed in pastel colours with Mika playing a pastel pink piano. The video ends with him jumping into the air and the picture being frozen. The video features the appearance of the famous "one take video" seen in videos like OK Go's "Here it Goes Again," but actually contains cuts hidden with the use of portals. Portal transition is when the cut takes place within a movement into a different but similar image giving the appearance of one smooth camera movement but in reality has been cut. For example, at 1:50 minutes into the video we see this portal transition happen using the image in the mirror. Another example of the hidden editing in this music video is seen at 1:10 into the video where we get a cross dissolve cut from one moving shot to another giving the appearance of a swift moving camera. Other "hidden cuts" are at 2:21, 2:32 and 3:09.

== Commercial performance ==
The single failed to make any impact on Billboard in the United States. It was a significant hit in Japan, where it reached number one on the Japan Hot 100 for a week. It is only the second international single to reach the top of the Japan Hot 100 after Leona Lewis's 2008 hit, "Bleeding Love". However, in its week of release it failed to crack the top 40 in the UK, charting at number 72, the same peak as his previous single "Rain", making "Blame It on the Girls" his second consecutive single to miss the UK top 40.

== Track listing ==
- Digital download
1. "Blame It on the Girls" – 3:33
2. "Blame It on the Girls" (Wolfgang Gartner Remix) – 6:16
3. "Blame It on the Girls" (Not on the Starsmith Remix) – 6:14
4. "Blame It on the Girls" (Music Video)
- CD single
1. "Blame It on the Girls" (Wolfgang Gartner Remix) – 6:16
2. "Blame It on the Girls" (Paul Woodford Remix) – 3:56
3. "Blame It on the Girls" (Alalal Remix) – 5:18
4. "Blame It on the Girls" (Anoraak Remix) – 5:12
5. "Blame It on the Girls" (Not on the Starsmith Remix) – 6:14

== Personnel ==
- Mika – vocals, background vocals
- Cherisse Osei – drums
- Greg Wells – drums, keyboards, percussion, programming
- Fabien Waltmann – keyboards
- Ida Falk Winland – background vocals

== Charts ==
=== Weekly charts ===
Chart performance for "Blame It on the Girls"
Chart (2009–2010)	Peak position
Belgium (Ultratop 50 Flanders)	28
Belgium (Ultratop 50 Wallonia)	24
Denmark (Tracklisten)	36
France (SNEP)	1
Hungary (Rádiós Top 40)	36
Italy (FIMI)	28
Japan Hot 100 (Billboard)	1
Spain Airplay (PROMUSICAE)	16
UK Singles (Official Charts Company)	72
US Heatseekers Songs (Billboard)	36

=== Year-end charts ===
Annual chart rankings for "Blame It on the Girls"
Chart (2009)	Position
Japan Adult Contemporary (Billboard)	78

Chart (2010)	Peak position
Italy Airplay (EarOne)	37
