= Dolls (Sweet Rock and Roll) =

Single by Primal Scream

from the album Riot City Blues
- Released: 7 August 2006
- Recorded: 2005
- Genre: Alternative rock, indie rock, experimental rock, blues rock
- Length: 4:00
- Label: Columbia
- Songwriters: Martin Duffy, Bobby Gillespie, Andrew Innes, Robert Young
- Producer: Youth

Primal Scream singles chronology
"Country Girl" (2006)	"Dolls (Sweet Rock and Roll)" (2006)	"Sometimes I Feel So Lonely" (2006)

"Dolls (Sweet Rock and Roll)" (sometimes referred to as "Dolls" or "Dolls (Sweet Rock n Roll)") is a song by Scottish band Primal Scream. It was released as the second single from the band's eighth album, Riot City Blues, on 7 August 2006, and reached number forty on the UK Singles Chart. It also features the vocals of Alison Mosshart (VV) from the British/American rock band, The Kills.

== Track listings ==
=== 7" ===
1. "Dolls (Sweet Rock and Roll)"
2. "Suicide Sally & Johnny Guitar" (Live XFM Session)

=== CD1 ===
1. "Dolls (Sweet Rock and Roll)"
2. "It's Not Enough" (Written by Johnny Thunders)

=== CD2 ===
1. "Dolls (Sweet Rock and Roll)"
2. "Zeppelin Blues While Thinking of Robert Parker"
3. "Bloods" (2 Lone Swordsmen Remix)
4. "Dolls (Sweet Rock and Roll)" (Video)

=== Trivia ===
This single is featured on the hit PlayStation 3 video game Motorstorm, and is most commonly played on the level "Rain God Mesa".
