= Kick-Ass: Music from the Motion Picture =

2010 film soundtrack

Soundtrack album by Various artists
- Released: 29 March 2010 (UK)
- Genre: Rock
- Length: 51:19
- Label: Polydor Ltd. (UK); Interscope (U.S.)

Singles from Kick-Ass: Music from the Motion Picture
- 1. "Kick Ass (We Are Young)" Released: 2 May 2010 (UK)

Kick Ass: Music from the Motion Picture is the soundtrack to the film of the same name. It was released in the United Kingdom on 29 March 2010, and in the United States on iTunes on 30 March 2010. The title song is sung by Mika, co-written by Jodi Marr and produced by RedOne.

The video for the single shows Mika as a helpless individual left in an alleyway after being mugged. He begins to sing and as he does, the words of empowerment in the lyrics and his finding of an issue of the Kick-Ass comic inspire him to run for the rooftops and wail the chorus to the sky. The video also features intercut scenes from the film.

The song "Stand Up" by The Prodigy is featured in both the teaser trailer and the red band trailer.

A song featured in the film, but not on the soundtrack is "Crazy", by Gnarls Barkley. This song is played in the Mistmobile while Kick-Ass and Red Mist cruise around town together. Also, the version of "Bad Reputation" used in the film was by Joan Jett but the version on the soundtrack is by a band called "The Hit Girls".

The song "Hey Little World" by The Hives, which played in the theatrical trailers was also not included.

== Track listing ==
No.	Title	Performed by	Length
1.	"Stand Up"	The Prodigy	5:08
2.	"Kick Ass (We Are Young)"	Mika vs. RedOne	3:11
3.	"Can't Go Back"	Primal Scream	3:46
4.	"There's a Pot Brewin'"	The Little Ones	3:13
5.	"Omen"	The Prodigy	3:54
6.	"Make Me Wanna Die"	The Pretty Reckless	3:55
7.	"Banana Splits (Kick-Ass Film Version)"	The Dickies	2:04
8.	"Starry Eyed"	Ellie Goulding	2:58
9.	"This Town Ain't Big Enough for Both of Us"	Sparks	3:03
10.	"We're All in Love"	The New York Dolls	4:50
11.	"Bongo Song"	Zongamin	5:00
12.	"Per Qualche Dollaro in Più (For a Few Dollars More)"	Ennio Morricone	2:53
13.	"Bad Reputation"	The Hit Girls	2:56
14.	"An American Trilogy"	Elvis Presley	4:31

== Kick-Ass: The Score ==
Kick-Ass: The Score

Soundtrack album by Henry Jackman
- Released: 17 May 2010 (UK)
- Genre: Soundtrack
- Length: 1:06:33
- Label: Polydor Ltd. (UK), Interscope (US)

Henry Jackman chronology
Henri 4 (2010)	Kick-Ass: The Score (2010)	Gulliver's Travels (2010)

The film's score was released on 17 May 2010 in the UK. Two of the instrumentals in the film are frequently compared to songs from other John Murphy composed soundtracks. These are "In The House, In A Heartbeat" from 28 Days Later: The Soundtrack Album and "Adagio in D-minor" from the Sunshine soundtrack. The former was used in the scene where Big Daddy guns down D'Amico's men in the warehouse and the latter was used when Hit-Girl is trying to rescue Kick-Ass and Big Daddy. They are called "Big Daddy Kills" and "Strobe (Adagio in D Minor)" respectively on the Kick-Ass score. One track, "Walk To Rasul's" was composed by Danny Elfman, who was referenced in the original comic.

No.	Title	Composer	Length
1.	"The Armenian Superhero"	Henry Jackman, Marius De Vries	1:59
2.	"Stand Up"	The Prodigy	3:32
3.	"Forcefield"	Marius De Vries	1:05
4.	"Watching"	Henry Jackman	1:01
5.	"Man in the Mirror"	Henry Jackman	1:08
6.	"A Punch in the Chest"	Marius De Vries	0:45
7.	"Roof Jump"	Marius De Vries, Ilan Eshkeri	1:31
8.	"Time to Engage"	Henry Jackman	0:26
9.	"Stabbing-Morphine"	Marius De Vries, The Prodigy	1:56
10.	"I'm Kick-Ass"	Henry Jackman	1:16
11.	"Famous"	Henry Jackman, John Murphy, Marius De Vries, Ilan Eshkeri	2:22
12.	"A Friend Like You"	Marius De Vries	0:43
13.	"Walk to Rasul's"	Danny Elfman	0:58
14.	"Trick or Treat?"	Marius De Vries, Ilan Eshkeri	2:43
15.	"Leaving Rasul's"	John Murphy	1:18
16.	"Hit-Girl & Big Daddy"	John Murphy	2:39
17.	"Damon & Marcus Comic Book"	Henry Jackman, John Murphy	3:24
18.	"I Miss You Both"	John Murphy, Ilan Eshkeri	1:40
19.	"Hunting Kick-Ass"	Henry Jackman	1:04
20.	"MistMobile"	Henry Jackman	1:40
21.	"Big Daddy Kills"	John Murphy	2:50
22.	"One Last Time"	Marius De Vries	0:57
23.	"Sleepover"	Marius De Vries	1:57
24.	"To Brooklyn Bridge"	Marius De Vries	1:42
25.	"Safehouse / Ambush"	John Murphy	2:34
26.	"Showtime Pt. 2 (It's Only the End of the World)"	John Murphy	2:25
27.	"Nightvision"	John Murphy	1:57
28.	"Strobe (Adagio in D Minor)"	John Murphy	2:02
29.	"Big Daddy Dies"	Henry Jackman, John Murphy	1:33
30.	"Hit-Girl Drives Home"	John Murphy	1:42
31.	"Marshmallows"	John Murphy	1:12
32.	"Choose Your Weapon"	Ilan Eshkeri	1:26
33.	"You Got Five Minutes"	Marius De Vries	0:35
34.	"No Power, No Responsibility"	Henry Jackman	1:16
35.	"The Corridor"	John Murphy	1:16
36.	"Kitchen Stand Off"	John Murphy, Ilan Eshkeri	1:19
37.	"The Fight"	Henry Jackman, John Murphy, Marius De Vries, Ilan Eshkeri	3:12
38.	"Flying Home"	Henry Jackman, John Murphy	1:49
39.	"True Identity"	Henry Jackman	1:39
