= Rain (Mika song) =

2009 single by Mika

Single by Mika

from the album The Boy Who Knew Too Much
- Released: 23 November 2009
- Recorded: 2008–2009
- Genre: Synthpop; electropop
- Length: 3:43 (album version); 3:35 (radio edit)
- Label: Casablanca
- Songwriters: Mika; Jodi Marr
- Producers: Greg Wells; Mika

Mika singles chronology
"We Are Golden" (2009)	"Rain" (2009)	"Blame It on the Girls" (2010)

Music video
- "Rain" on YouTube

"Rain" is a song by Mika, released as the second single from his second studio album, The Boy Who Knew Too Much. The song was produced and mixed by Greg Wells and features violinist Owen Pallett.

== Description ==
The song's lyrics are taken from a break-up letter that Mika wrote to an ex.

In an interview with Q magazine, Mika says:

["Rain"] is an unapologetic '80s pop record. I bumped into producer Stuart Price while he was working with The Killers at Olympic Studios. He helped me program this. It reminded him of ABBA and Frankie Goes to Hollywood.

— Mika, Q Magazine

Keira performed Mika's song at Australian Idol's grand finale along with "We Are Golden". On 5 February 2010 Mika performed a special operatic version of the song in a duet with opera star Danielle de Niese on the ITV1 show 'Popstar to Operastar'.

== Reception ==
The song received positive reviews from most critics. Nick Levene from Digital Spy gave to the song 4 stars (out of 5) and said: "Those unconvinced that much had changed when Mika returned with 'We Are Golden' this summer should be pleasantly surprised by 'Rain', the second single from his second album. The shrieking has been reined in, the nursery rhyme hooks have been ditched and instead we're treated to a concoction of shimmering synths, layered vocals and throbbing, clubby beats. As it builds towards a crescendo that's both intriguingly dark and glitteringly magical, Mika proves he's perfectly capable of channelling his hyperactivity in the right direction. Here's hoping for more of this in the future". Heather Phares from AllMusic stated that "Rain" is a kissing cousin to "Relax"'s pulsing, melancholy disco-pop.

== Music video ==
A frame from the "Rain" music video.

The music video for "Rain" was filmed in Epping Forest in Essex and premiered online on 16 October 2009. It was directed by Nez Khammal. The video is set in a dark enchanted forest with Mika waking up in a colourful tent. He is soon joined by various strangely dressed imps and creatures who dance around him at first but chase him out of the forest amid exploding fireworks.

== Notable performances ==
Mika sang "Rain" at the Royal Variety Performance in 2009 before Queen Elizabeth II.

== Track listing ==
UK CD single
No.	Title	Length
1.	"Rain"	3:43
2.	"Poker Face" (Radio 1 Live Lounge Session)	3:09
3.	"Rain" (Seamus Haji Big Love Edit)	3:05

French 2-Track CD single
No.	Title	Length
1.	"Rain"	3:43
2.	"Rain" (Acoustic Version)	3:04

French 4-Track CD single
No.	Title	Length
1.	"Rain"	3:43
2.	"Poker Face" (Radio 1 Live Lounge Session)	3:09
3.	"Rain" (Seamus Haji Big Love Edit)	3:05
4.	"Rain" (Benny Benassi Remix)	6:10

Italian CD single
No.	Title	Length
1.	"Rain" (Benny Benassi Edit)	3:29
2.	"Rain" (Seamus Haji Big Love Edit)	3:08
3.	"Rain" (Diamenco Torti Edit)	3:36
4.	"Rain" (Benny Benassi Remix)	6:10
5.	"Rain" (Benny Benassi Dub)	6:13
6.	"Rain" (Seamus Haji Big Love Remix)	8:25
7.	"Rain" (Diamenco Torti Extended Remix)	6:17
8.	"Rain" (Magistrates Remix)	4:34
9.	"Rain" (Radio Edit)	3:26

UK Digital Download
No.	Title	Length
1.	"Rain"	3:43
2.	"Rain" (Benny Benassi Remix)	6:10
3.	"Rain" (Seamus Haji Remix)	5:43
4.	"Rain" (Acoustic Version)	3:04

== Credits ==
- Mika – vocals, keyboards, background vocals
- Chris Nicolaides – background vocals
- Owen Pallett – violin
- Tim Pierce – guitar
- Dan Rothchild – background vocals
- Greg Wells – keyboards, drums, bass, percussion, programming
- Martin Waugh – background vocals
- Stuart Price – Programming (uncredited)

== Charts and certifications ==
The single was released on 23 November 2009 in the United Kingdom in both digital and physical formats. The single peaked at #72 on the UK Singles Chart, making this Mika's lowest charting UK single. Casablanca Records believed this was due to low promotional airplay on UK Radio. The song was received better in continental Europe, where it peaked at #4 in Italy, being certified platinum by the Federation of the Italian Music Industry. It also peaked inside the Top 40 in the Netherlands and Spain, and debuted at #8 in Wallonia. The single debuted at #5 in French Singles Chart and peaked #16 in Digital Singles Chart.

=== Weekly charts ===
Chart (2009–2010)	Peak position
Australia (ARIA)	90
Belgium (Ultratop 50 Flanders)	5
Belgium (Ultratop 50 Wallonia)	3
CIS Airplay (TopHit)	9
Europe (European Hot 100 Singles)	13
France (SNEP)	5
Germany (GfK)	56
Greece (IFPI)	11
Israel (Israeli Airplay Chart)	2
Italy (FIMI)	4
Netherlands (Dutch Top 40)	24
Russia Airplay (TopHit)	9
Scotland Singles (OCC)	80
Slovakia (Rádio Top 100)	13
Spain (PROMUSICAE)	18
Switzerland (Schweizer Hitparade)	28
UK Singles (OCC)	72

=== Year-end charts ===
Chart (2009)	Position
Belgium (Ultratop Wallonia)	93
CIS (TopHit)	147
France (SNEP)	78
Russia Airplay (TopHit)	174
Chart (2010)	Position
Belgium (Ultratop Flanders)	83
Belgium (Ultratop Wallonia)	40
France (SNEP)	38
European Hot 100 Singles	52
Italy (FIMI)	69

=== Certifications ===
Region	Certification	Certified units/sales
Italy (FIMI)	Platinum	20,000^{*}
^{*} Sales figures based on certification alone.
