= Country Girl (Primal Scream song) =

2006 single by Primal Scream

Single by Primal Scream

from the album Riot City Blues
- B-side: "Stone Ya to the Bone"; "Gimme Some Truth"; "To Live Is to Fly"
- Released: 22 May 2006
- Length: 4:30
- Label: Columbia
- Songwriter: Primal Scream
- Producer: Youth

Primal Scream singles chronology
"Some Velvet Morning" (2003)	"Country Girl" (2006)	"Dolls (Sweet Rock and Roll)" (2006)

"Country Girl" is a song by Scottish rock band Primal Scream. It was released as a single on 22 May 2006 and was the first single issued from the band's eighth album, Riot City Blues (2006). It became the band's highest-charting in the United Kingdom as well as their first UK top-five entry and their third top-10 single. In the band's native Scotland, the song reached number three on the Scottish Singles Chart, becoming their most successful single since "Kowalski" in 1997. "Country Girl" was released to American radio on 24 July 2006.

The single's cover was photographed by William Eggleston. "Country Girl" was frequently used by ITV during their coverage of the 2006 FIFA World Cup, alongside the Kasabian cover version of David Bowie's "'Heroes'" and "Valerie" by the Zutons. It also features as the theme tune of The Janice Long Review Show. "Country Girl" was covered by Irish actress Jessie Buckley for the 2019 country music drama film Wild Rose.

== Music video ==
The girl featured in the video (played by Helena Mattsson) is inspired by Baby (played by Sheri Moon) from Rob Zombie's House of 1000 Corpses / The Devil's Rejects. The music video was directed by Jonas Åkerlund.

== Track listings ==
All songs were written by Primal Scream unless otherwise noted.

UK CD single

1. "Country Girl"
2. "Stone Ya to the Bone"
3. "Gimme Some Truth" (John Lennon)
4. "Country Girl" (video)

UK 7-inch single

A. "Country Girl" – 4:33
B. "Gimme Some Truth" (John Lennon)

European CD single

1. "Country Girl"
2. "To Live Is to Fly" (Townes Van Zandt)

== Charts ==
=== Weekly charts ===
Chart (2006)	Peak position
Europe (Eurochart Hot 100)	16
Finland (Suomen virallinen lista)	17
Ireland (IRMA)	18
Scottish Singles Sales (Official Charts)	3
Sweden (Sverigetopplistan)	47
UK Singles (Official Charts)	5

=== Year-end charts ===
Chart (2006)	Position
UK Singles (OCC)	106

== Certifications ==
Region	Certification	Certified units/sales
United Kingdom (BPI)	Silver	200,000^{‡}
^{‡} Sales+streaming figures based on certification alone.

== Release history ==
Region	Date	Format(s)	Label(s)	Ref.
United Kingdom	22 May 2006	CD	Columbia	
United States	24 July 2006	Modern rock radio	Columbia	
