= Sometimes I Feel So Lonely =

Single by Primal Scream

from the album Riot City Blues
- Released: 18 December 2006
- Label: Columbia
- Songwriter(s): Martin Duffy, Bobby Gillespie, Andrew Innes, Gary Mounfield

Primal Scream singles chronology
"Dolls (Sweet Rock and Roll)" (2006)	"Sometimes I Feel So Lonely" (2006)	"Can't Go Back" (2008)

"Sometimes I Feel So Lonely" is the third single from the Riot City Blues album by Scottish rock band Primal Scream. It is the tenth track on Riot City Blues and was released just before Christmas on 18 December 2006 on limited 7" vinyl and download from iTunes UK, although it was actually put onto iTunes about a week before then. The 7" vinyl was limited to only 2000 copies.

The backing vocals on the single and the 7" were recorded by six year-6 pupils (10 - 11 year olds) in a primary school in East Sheen.

== Track listing ==
7"

1. "Sometimes I Feel So Lonely" - 4:12
2. "Gamblin' Bar Room Blues" - 5:15
