= Trinity Hall (Winterton, Newfoundland and Labrador) =

Building in Winterton, Newfoundland and Labrador, Canada

Coordinates: 47°57′21″N 53°19′44″W

Trinity Hall, formerly St. Luke's Anglican Church, is a 133-year-old building located on the south shore of Trinity Bay in the historic fishing outport of Winterton, Newfoundland.

The former St. Luke's Anglican Church was put up for sale in the spring of 2022 and purchased that summer by Canadian musician and record producer Greg Wells, who has family roots in Winterton. Wells converted the old church into a nonprofit performance venue and recording studio for the purposes of raising money for the local community.

A documentary film, titled Where Once They Stood We Stand: The Birth Of Trinity Hall, was directed by Brad Tuck and aired on Apple TV. The film details the journey of Wells finding out about the church for sale, then finding himself pulled toward buying it and preparing with the newly formed Trinity Hall board of directors for a grand opening.
