= Can't Go Back (Primal Scream song) =

Single by Primal Scream

from the album Beautiful Future
- B-side: "Urban Guerrilla"
- Released: 14 July 2008
- Recorded: 2007
- Genre: Alternative rock; electronic rock; dance-rock; new wave
- Length: 3:44
- Label: B-Unique
- Songwriters: Martin Duffy, Bobby Gillespie, Andrew Innes, Gary Mounfield
- Producers: Paul Epworth; Bjorn Yttling

Primal Scream singles chronology
"Sometimes I Feel So Lonely" (2006)	"Can't Go Back" (2008)	"Uptown" (2008)

"Can't Go Back" is a song by the band Primal Scream. Released on 14 July 2008, it was the first single to be released from the band's ninth album, Beautiful Future. The song entered the UK Singles Chart at number 48 on 26 July 2008. The song was featured in the video for the 2008 British Grand Prix at the Formula One website. The song is also featured in the 2010 film Kick-Ass, its soundtrack album, and trailers for the 2011 film Johnny English Reborn.

The single was engineered by Mark Rankin and produced by Paul Epworth and Björn Yttling (of Peter Bjorn and John) at Primal Scream’s North London studio.

As the first taste of Beautiful Future, “Can’t Go Back” heralded Primal Scream’s latest sound, a fusion of pop, new wave, and traditional song structures with the punk aggression and electro production qualities that distinguished their 2000 album XTRMNTR. It is a more straightforward rock song that plays up the band’s bombast and immediacy rather than an attempt to innovate.

This approach was referenced in the sometimes self-contradictory reviews for “Can’t Go Back,” which reflected a growing critical ambivalence towards Primal Scream. The NME equivocated, “With a dental-drill hook and Bobby muttering about how he ‘Stuck a needle in my arm…stuck it in my baby’s heart,’ ‘Can’t Go Back’ rockets straight from the XTRMNTR school of propulsive, night-streaked electro-rock’n’roll. In anyone else’s hands it’d sound try-hard, but it’s impossible to call them a cliché when they invented so many.”

== Track listing ==
CD

1. "Can't Go Back" - 3:45
2. "Jesus is my Air-o-plane" - 3:07

7"

1. "Can't Go Back" - 3:42
2. "Urban Guerrilla" - 3:43
