= Riot City Blues =

Studio album by Primal Scream
- Released: 5 June 2006
- Studio: Olympic Studios, London; The Bunker, London
- Genre: Garage rock; blues rock; roots rock
- Length: 41:28
- Label: Columbia
- Producer: Youth

Primal Scream chronology
Live in Japan (2003)	Riot City Blues (2006)	Beautiful Future (2008)

Singles from Riot City Blues
- 1. "Country Girl" Released: 22 May 2006; 2. "Dolls (Sweet Rock and Roll)" Released: 7 August 2006; 3. "Sometimes I Feel So Lonely" Released: 18 December 2006

Riot City Blues is the eighth studio album by Scottish rock band Primal Scream, released on 5 June 2006 by Columbia Records. It peaked at number 5 on the UK Albums Chart. With this album, the band left behind the electronic elements they had used on their previous albums XTRMNTR (2000) and Evil Heat (2003), returning to more traditional rock and roll. The album features guest appearances from Will Sergeant, Warren Ellis, and Alison Mosshart, and was the last album to feature guitarist Robert "Throb" Young, who departed before the album's UK tour for personal reasons.

The album's first single "Country Girl" became the band's highest charting in their career. "Dolls (Sweet Rock and Roll)" and "Sometimes I Feel So Lonely" were also released as singles.

== Composition ==
Riot City Blues is Primal Scream's second garage blues album, following Give Out but Don't Give Up (1994), and is also considered to be an album of "refried" roots rock. Music critic Tom Breihan considers it to be bassist Mani's second "retro-rock" album, after the Stone Roses' Second Coming (1994).

== Critical reception ==
Professional ratings
Aggregate scores
Source	Rating
Metacritic	59/100
Review scores
Source	Rating
AllMusic	3.5/5 stars
Entertainment Weekly	B+
Filter	90%
The Guardian	4/5 stars
The Irish Times	4/5 stars
Pitchfork	2.3/10
Playlouder	3.5/5 stars
Q	3/5 stars
Rolling Stone	3/5 stars
Uncut	8/10

At Metacritic, which assigns a weighted average score out of 100 to reviews from mainstream critics, the album received an average score of 59, based on 19 reviews, indicating "mixed or average reviews".

The album was released to varying reviews. A particularly scathing review by Pitchfork claimed that the album was "flat and dead. It's as if Primal Scream have run completely out of ideas and so they've reverted to the detestable fallbacks of honking harmonicas and bar-band choogles, acting like college freshmen who just discovered blues." While The Guardian said "...Primal Scream are the kind of band that would probably snap there's no such thing as a guilty pleasure, only good music and bad music. But their eighth album undermines that claim. On the one hand, it is conservatism dressed up as rebellion, derivative, self-parodic and very, very, stupid. On the other, it boasts an energy and a shamelessness that demands you abandon your vast array of reservations. No mean feat."

Riot City Blues was listed among the ten worst Scottish albums ever made in a 2007 online poll of music fans.

== Track listing ==
All tracks are written by Primal Scream.

No.	Title	Length
1.	"Country Girl"	4:31
2.	"Nitty Gritty"	3:38
3.	"Suicide Sally & Johnny Guitar"	3:14
4.	"When the Bomb Drops"	4:34
5.	"Little Death"	6:22
6.	"The 99th Floor"	3:50
7.	"We're Gonna Boogie"	2:52
8.	"Dolls (Sweet Rock and Roll)"	3:58
9.	"Hell's Comin' Down"	3:27
10.	"Sometimes I Feel So Lonely"	5:06

== Personnel ==
Credits adapted from liner notes.

Primal Scream

- Bobby Gillespie – vocals
- Andrew Innes – guitar, mandolin, banjo, synthesizer
- Martin Duffy – piano, organ, harmonium, harmonica
- Robert Young – guitars, harmonica
- Gary "Mani" Mounfield – bass guitar
- Darrin Mooney – drums, percussion

Additional musicians

- Alison Mosshart – additional vocals (3, 8)
- Will Sergeant – guitar (4, 5)
- Chris Allen – hurdy-gurdy (5)
- Warren Ellis – violin (9)
- Juliet Roberts – backing vocals (1, 2, 5, 10)
- Sharlene Hector – backing vocals (1, 2, 5, 10)
- Sylvia Mason-James – backing vocals (1, 2, 5, 10)
- John Gibbons – backing vocals (1, 2, 5, 10)
- Richard Beale – French horn (10)
- Tim Bran – programming

Technical

- Ryan Castle, Greg Gordon – engineer
- Clive Goddard – recording

== Charts ==
=== Weekly charts ===
Chart (2006)	Peak position
Australian Albums (ARIA)	54
French Albums (SNEP)	74
Irish Albums (IRMA)	14
Norwegian Albums (VG-lista)	15
Scottish Albums (OCC)	2
Spanish Albums (PROMUSICAE)	81
Swedish Albums (Sverigetopplistan)	18
UK Albums (OCC)	5

=== Year-end charts ===
Chart (2006)	Position
UK Albums (OCC)	153
