= Life in Cartoon Motion =

Studio album by Mika
- Released: 5 February 2007
- Recorded: 2006
- Studios: AXIA (London, England); Rocket Carousel Studio (Los Angeles, California); Sunset Sound (Hollywood, Los Angeles, California); Sage & Sound (Hollywood, Los Angeles, California); Miami Hit Masters (Miami, FL); Red Door Studios (Kensington, MD); Capitol Studios (Hollywood, Los Angeles, California)
- Genres: Power pop; glam rock; dance-pop; disco
- Length: 46:16
- Label: Casablanca
- Producer: Greg Wells

Mika chronology
Dodgy Holiday (2006)	Life in Cartoon Motion (2007)	Songs for Sorrow (2009)

Singles from Life in Cartoon Motion
- 1. "Grace Kelly" Released: 8 January 2007; 2. "Love Today" Released: 23 April 2007; 3. "Big Girl (You Are Beautiful)" Released: 23 July 2007; 4. "Happy Ending" Released: 15 October 2007; 5. "Relax, Take It Easy" Released: 23 December 2007; 6. "Lollipop" Released: 31 December 2007

Life in Cartoon Motion is the debut album released by British singer-songwriter Mika. The album was produced by Greg Wells, mixed by Wells, with co-production on two songs by Jodi Marr and John Merchant. The album was released via Casablanca Records on 5 February 2007 in the United Kingdom, and on 27 March 2007 in the United States.

Life in Cartoon Motion was the #9 top selling album in the world in 2007. The album's lead single, "Grace Kelly", stayed at number one on the UK Singles Chart for five consecutive weeks and became a worldwide number-one hit.

== Background ==
Prior to obtaining his record deal, Mika sent demos to many record companies in Britain, but was never signed. One record label in particular claimed that Mika had a good voice, but insisted he write more conventional songs like Robbie Williams in order to become more commercial. Mika rejected this advice. The song "Grace Kelly" was inspired by these problems. In 2006 Mika signed with Casablanca Records and began recording his debut album. His musical influences are based in classical music.

Before Mika released his debut album, he promised the media that "It was a magical world that you could live in. A parallel universe for people that is illusory and enchanting and amazing." Some songs on the album are sexually ambiguous, which prompted some questioning regarding Mika's sexuality. On this, Mika commented that he has no taboos about what he can use to tell a story or what stories he can actually tell, and said that while he believes that sexualising music is great, politically sexualising music and making the artist's sexuality the defining point of someone's music is "boring". He said about his own sexuality: "laying myself out on the table to almost a tabloid level and kind of sharing my entire personal life, I'm really not into that." The songs on the album have different subjects. "Grace Kelly", as stated before, is about the struggle of getting a record deal. Mika stated that the song is important because "it's a flagpole for the record in terms of lyrical content and the whole pop vision I wanted to get across."

The cover for the album and booklet were designed by Mika's sister, Yasmine, who works under the pen name DaWack, Richard Hogg and Mika himself. In March 2007 the album was released in the United States. Before its release there was much publicity about the album, mainly due to its success in Europe. Mika commented on the hype by saying: "I think I'm lucky. Hype can be good and hype can be bad. The good thing that's happening to me is that the hype is about the project, it's about the music ... I'm not the son of anyone famous, I haven't really slept with anyone particularly well-known ... it's really just about music, and that's something I think is very healthy."

== Reception ==
Professional ratings
Aggregate scores
Source	Rating
Metacritic	55/100
Review scores
Source	Rating
AllMusic	3.5/5 stars
Blender	4/5 stars
Entertainment Weekly	B+
The Guardian	1/5 stars
Mojo	3/5 stars
The Observer	4/5 stars
Pitchfork	1.5/10
Q	3/5 stars
Rolling Stone	3/5 stars
Spin	3.5/5 stars

Initial critical response to Life in Cartoon Motion was generally mixed. On Metacritic, which assigns a normalised rating out of 100 to reviews from mainstream critics, the album received an average score of 55, based on 23 reviews, indicating "mixed or average reviews". In January 2007, Mika was considered the best new talent in the BBC's Sound of 2007 music poll. About 130 music critics and broadcasters from the UK agreed that Mika was the sound of 2007.

The album received highly polarised reviews, earning one star from The Guardian and four stars in the London Evening Standard. The album received a score of 1 out of 10 from the Drowned in Sound website, which prompted Brian May of Queen, a fan of Mika, to criticise the website for making unnecessary personal attacks on Mika.

== Release ==
The original version of the album, released in the United Kingdom and Europe on 5 February 2007, contains a total of 12 tracks, including the hidden track "Over My Shoulder" and the bonus track "Ring Ring". It also includes an enhanced section, with links to music videos and live performances, as well as other exclusive content. The version released via the iTunes Store in Europe features three additional acoustic recordings as bonus tracks. The American version of the album, released on 27 March 2007, is essentially the same as the British release, however, it includes the exclusive bonus track "Erase", not included on the original release. American versions of the album bought at Best Buy stores also carry two exclusive bonus tracks - acoustic versions of "Love Today" and "Satellite", while the American iTunes Store version also includes an exclusive acoustic version of "Grace Kelly". The version of the album released in Japan is essentially the same as the original British release, however, it also includes the American exclusive track "Erase", as well as the Japanese exclusive track "Your Sympathy", and an enhanced element containing the music video for "Grace Kelly".

The demo version of the album, issued to media journalists and critics, has a very different track listing than any of the main versions of the albums. It does not include the tracks "Lollipop", "Big Girl (You Are Beautiful)" and "Over My Shoulder", but does include the Japanese only bonus track "Your Sympathy", as well as including "Gave It All Away", Mika's original version of the track, before it was given to Boyzone. Mika's version had never appeared on any other release, until the release of the Asian Tour Edition in March 2008, which includes the eleven standard tracks from the British album, the European bonus track "Ring Ring", "Gave It All Away" from the demo version, "Erase" from the American version, "Your Sympathy" from the Japanese edition, and the B-side recordings "Satellite", "Only Lonely One" and "Instant Martyr". The album was also packed with a bonus disc, including six acoustic recordings, four live recordings, and the single mix of "Happy Ending".

== Chart performance ==
The album had significant success in Europe, with the album achieving 1.8 million certified sales in the United Kingdom and 1.17 million in France. The album was certified five-times platinum in Belgium and two-times platinum in Switzerland, and three-times platinum in Ireland, also achieving gold and/or platinum status in Spain, Portugal, the Netherlands, Austria, Hungary, Italy, Russia, Norway, Sweden, Finland, Denmark, Germany and Greece. The album also charted in the Czech Republic and was certified in Japan. In Oceania, the album was certified two-times platinum in Australia and gold in New Zealand. In North America, the album was certified two-times platinum in Canada.

== Track listing ==
Standard edition
No.	Title	Writer(s)	Length
1.	"Grace Kelly"	Mika; Jodi Marr; John Merchant; Dan Warner	3:07
2.	"Lollipop"	Mika	3:03
3.	"My Interpretation"	Mika; Jodi Marr; Richie Supa	3:35
4.	"Love Today"	Mika	3:55
5.	"Relax, Take It Easy" (contains a prelude to "Any Other World" at the end)	Mika; Nick Van Eede	4:30
6.	"Any Other World"	Mika	4:19
7.	"Billy Brown"	Mika	3:14
8.	"Big Girl (You Are Beautiful)"	Mika	4:08
9.	"Stuck in the Middle"	Mika	4:08
10.	"Happy Ending"	Mika	4:36
11.	"Over My Shoulder" (hidden track)	Mika	4:45

European bonus track
No.	Title	Writer(s)	Length
12.	"Ring Ring"	Mika; Jodi Marr	2:50

iTunes Store bonus tracks
No.	Title	Writer(s)	Length
13.	"Grace Kelly" (acoustic)	Mika; Jodi Marr; John Merchant; Dan Warner	3:09
14.	"Stuck in the Middle" (acoustic)	Mika	3:56
15.	"Relax, Take It Easy" (acoustic)	Mika; Nick Eede	3:03

American edition
No.	Title	Writer(s)	Length
1.	"Grace Kelly"	Mika; Jodi Marr; John Merchant; Dan Warner	3:07
2.	"Lollipop"	Mika	3:03
3.	"My Interpretation"	Mika; Jodi Marr; Richie Supa	3:35
4.	"Love Today"	Mika	3:55
5.	"Relax, Take It Easy"	Mika; Nick Eede	3:45
6.	"Ring Ring" (contains a prelude to "Any Other World" at the end)	Mika; Jodi Marr	3:37
7.	"Any Other World"	Mika	4:19
8.	"Billy Brown"	Mika	3:14
9.	"Big Girl (You Are Beautiful)"	Mika	4:08
10.	"Stuck in the Middle"	Mika	4:08
11.	"Erase"	Mika; Desmond Child; Jodi Marr	3:38
12.	"Happy Ending"	Mika	4:36
13.	"Over My Shoulder" (hidden track)	Mika	4:45

Best Buy edition bonus tracks
No.	Title	Writer(s)	Length
14.	"Love Today" (acoustic)	Mika	2:58
15.	"Satellite" (acoustic)	David J. Matthews	4:13

US iTunes Store bonus track
No.	Title	Writer(s)	Length
16.	"Grace Kelly" (acoustic)	Mika; Jodi Marr; John Merchant; Dan Warner	3:09

Japanese edition
No.	Title	Writer(s)	Length
1.	"Grace Kelly"	Mika; Jodi Marr; John Merchant; Dan Warner	3:07
2.	"Lollipop"	Mika	3:03
3.	"My Interpretation"	Mika; Jodi Marr; Richie Supa	3:35
4.	"Love Today"	Mika	3:55
5.	"Relax, Take It Easy"	Mika; Nick Eede	3:45
6.	"Ring Ring" (contains a prelude to "Any Other World" at the end)	Mika; Jodi Marr	3:37
7.	"Any Other World"	Mika	4:19
8.	"Billy Brown"	Mika	3:14
9.	"Big Girl (You Are Beautiful)"	Mika	4:08
10.	"Stuck in the Middle"	Mika	4:08
11.	"Erase"	Mika; Desmond Child; Jodi Marr	3:38
12.	"Your Sympathy"	Mika; Jodi Marr; Richie Supa	3:17
13.	"Happy Ending"	Mika	4:36
14.	"Over My Shoulder" (hidden track)	Mika	4:45

Demo version
No.	Title	Writer(s)	Length
1.	"Love Today"	Mika	3:55
2.	"Grace Kelly"	Mika; Jodi Marr; John Merchant; Dan Warner	3:07
3.	"Your Sympathy"	Mika; Jodi Marr; Richie Supa	3:17
4.	"Happy Ending"	Mika	4:36
5.	"Billy Brown"	Mika	3:14
6.	"Ring Ring"	Mika; Jodi Marr	2:50
7.	"My Interpretation"	Mika; Jodi Marr; Richie Supa	3:35
8.	"Stuck in the Middle"	Mika	4:08
9.	"Any Other World"	Mika	4:19
10.	"Relax, Take It Easy"	Mika; Nick Eede	4:30
11.	"Gave It All Away"	Mika; Greg Wells	4:17

Asian Tour edition: disc 1
No.	Title	Writer(s)	Length
1.	"Grace Kelly"	Mika; Jodi Marr; John Merchant; Dan Warner	3:07
2.	"Lollipop"	Mika	3:03
3.	"My Interpretation"	Mika; Jodi Marr; Richie Supa	3:35
4.	"Love Today"	Mika	3:55
5.	"Relax, Take It Easy" (contains a prelude to "Any Other World" at the end)	Mika; Nick Eede	4:30
6.	"Any Other World"	Mika	4:19
7.	"Billy Brown"	Mika	3:14
8.	"Big Girl (You Are Beautiful)"	Mika	4:08
9.	"Stuck in the Middle"	Mika	4:08
10.	"Happy Ending"	Mika	4:36
11.	"Over My Shoulder"	Mika	4:45
12.	"Ring Ring"	Mika; Jodi Marr	2:50
13.	"Erase"	Mika; Desmond Child; Jodi Marr	3:38
14.	"Your Sympathy"	Mika; Jodi Marr; Richie Supa	3:17
15.	"Gave It All Away"	Mika; Greg Wells	4:17
16.	"Satellite"	David J. Matthews	4:15
17.	"Only Lonely One"	Mika	3:43
18.	"Instant Martyr"	Mika; Jodi Marr; Richie Supa	3:02

Asian Tour edition: disc 2
No.	Title	Writer(s)	Length
1.	"Grace Kelly" (acoustic)	Mika; Jodi Marr; John Merchant; Dan Warner	3:09
2.	"Stuck in the Middle" (acoustic)	Mika	3:56
3.	"Relax, Take It Easy" (acoustic)	Mika; Nick Eede	3:03
4.	"Love Today" (acoustic)	Mika	2:58
5.	"Satellite" (acoustic)	David J. Matthews	4:13
6.	"Billy Brown" (acoustic)	Mika	3:14
7.	"Standing in the Way of Control" (live from Radio 1's Big Weekend)	Beth Ditto	4:14
8.	"I Want You Back" (live from L'Olympia, Paris)	Berry Gordy; Freddie Perren; Alphonzo Mizell; Deke Richards	4:02
9.	"Sweet Dreams (Are Made of This)" (Live from Radio 1's Big Weekend)	Annie Lennox; David Stewart	3:23
10.	"Lollipop" (live from L'Olympia, Paris)	Mika	3:41
11.	"Happy Ending" (the L.A. edit)	Mika	3:41

== Personnel ==
- Mika – lead vocals, piano, keyboards, guitar, backing vocals, percussion, programming
- Greg Wells – producer, mixer, guitar, bass, drums, programming, percussion, keyboards
- Tim Pierce – guitar
- Dylan Schiavone – guitar
- Lyle Workman – guitar
- Dan Rothchild – bass
- Matt Chamberlain – drums
- Derek Cintron – Drums on "Love Today" (mis-credited as percussion)
- Fabien-Waltmann – programming
- Backing vocals by: Zuleika Penniman, Paloma Penniman, Fortuné Penniman, Audrey Moukataff, Alexander Millar and Ida Falk Winland

=== Orchestra ===
- Larry Corbett – cello
- Lee Thornburg – horns
- The Spoon Orchestra of Chiswick – orchestra
- Studio Gospel Choir – backing vocals
- Maxi Anderson – choir leader
- Paul Buckmaster – string arrangement
- Jerry Hey – brass arrangement

=== Production ===
- Jodi Marr – producer, percussion
- John Merchant – producer, recording engineer
- Joe Zook – recording engineer
- Carlos Alvarez – recording engineer
- Joe Chiccarelli – recording engineer
- Chris Nicoladies – recording engineer
- Drew Pearson – recording engineer

== Charts ==
=== Weekly charts ===
Weekly chart performance for Life in Cartoon Motion
Chart (2007–2008)	Peak position
Argentine Albums Chart	1
Australian Albums (ARIA)	5
Austrian Albums (Ö3 Austria)	6
Belgian Albums (Ultratop Flanders)	1
Belgian Alternative Albums (Ultratop Flanders)	1
Belgian Albums (Ultratop Wallonia)	1
Canadian Albums (Billboard)	2
Czech Republic Albums (IFPI)	24
Danish Albums (Hitlisten)	3
Dutch Albums (Album Top 100)	1
Dutch Alternative Albums (Mega Alternative Top 30)	2
Europe (European Top 100 Albums)	1
Finnish Albums (Suomen virallinen lista)	11
French Albums (SNEP)	1
German Albums (Offizielle Top 100)	6
Greek Albums (IFPI)	1
Hungarian Albums (MAHASZ)	12
Irish Albums (IRMA)	2
Italian Albums (FIMI)	9
Japanese Albums (Oricon)	13
New Zealand Albums (RMNZ)	3
Norwegian Albums (VG-lista)	1
Portuguese Albums (AFP)	9
Russian Albums (Russian Music Charts)	1
Scottish Albums (Official Charts)	1
South African Albums (RISA)	15
Spanish Albums (Promusicae)	11
Swedish Albums (Sverigetopplistan)	3
Swiss Albums (Schweizer Hitparade)	1
UK Albums (Official Charts)	1
US Billboard 200	29

Chart (2022)	Peak position
Lithuanian Albums (AGATA)	9

=== Year-end charts ===
2007 year-end chart performance for Life in Cartoon Motion
Chart (2007)	Position
Australian Albums (ARIA)	18
Austrian Albums (Ö3 Austria)	26
Belgian Albums (Ultratop Flanders)	3
Belgian Albums (Ultratop Wallonia)	2
Dutch Albums (Album Top 100)	6
French Albums (SNEP)	1
German Albums (Offizielle Top 100)	12
Irish Albums (IRMA)	19
Italian Albums (FIMI)	25
Spanish Albums (PROMUSICAE)	29
Swedish Albums (Sverigetopplistan)	14
Swiss Albums (Schweizer Hitparade)	4
UK Albums (OCC)	3

2008 year-end chart performance for Life in Cartoon Motion
Chart (2008)	Position
Australian Albums (ARIA)	61
Dutch Albums (Album Top 100)	59
French Albums (SNEP)	17
German Albums (Offizielle Top 100)	97
Italian Albums (FIMI)	94
Swiss Albums (Schweizer Hitparade)	48
UK Albums (OCC)	26

=== Decade-end charts ===
2000s-end chart performance for Life in Cartoon Motion
Chart (2000s)	Position
Dutch Albums (Album Top 100)	92
UK Albums (OCC)	54

== Certifications ==
Certifications and sales for Life in Cartoon Motion
Region	Certification	Certified units/sales
Argentina (CAPIF)	Gold	20,000^{^}
Australia (ARIA)	2× Platinum	140,000^{^}
Austria (IFPI Austria)	Platinum	20,000^{*}
Belgium (BRMA)	5× Platinum	250,000^{*}
Canada (Music Canada)	2× Platinum	200,000^{^}
Denmark (IFPI Danmark)	2× Platinum	40,000^{‡}
France (SNEP)	2× Diamond	1,170,000
Germany (BVMI)	Platinum	200,000^{^}
Greece (IFPI Greece)	Gold	7,500^{^}
Hungary (MAHASZ)	Gold	3,000^{^}
Ireland (IRMA)	3× Platinum	45,000^{^}
Italy (FIMI)	Platinum	80,000^{*}
Italy (FIMI) since 2009	Gold	25,000^{‡}
Japan (RIAJ)	Gold	100,000^{^}
Netherlands (NVPI)	Platinum	70,000^{^}
New Zealand (RMNZ)	Gold	7,500^{^}
Poland (ZPAV)	Gold	10,000^{*}
Portugal (AFP)	Platinum	20,000^{^}
Russia (NFPF)	Platinum	20,000^{*}
South Korea	—	52,110
Spain (Promusicae)	Platinum	80,000^{^}
Sweden (GLF)	Platinum	40,000^{^}
Switzerland (IFPI Switzerland)	2× Platinum	60,000^{^}
United Kingdom (BPI)	6× Platinum	1,800,000^{‡}
Summaries
Europe (IFPI)	4× Platinum	4,000,000^{*}
^{*} Sales figures based on certification alone.^{^} Shipments figures based on certification alone.^{‡} Sales+streaming figures based on certification alone.
