= Kick Ass (We Are Young) =

2010 single by Mika vs. RedOne

Single by Mika vs. RedOne

from the album Kick-Ass: Music from the Motion Picture
- Released: 2 May 2010
- Recorded: 2010
- Genre: Electropop
- Length: 3:12
- Label: Casablanca; Polydor
- Songwriters: Mika; Jodi Marr
- Producer: RedOne

Mika singles chronology
"Blame It on the Girls" (2010)	"Kick Ass (We Are Young)" (2010)	"Elle me dit" (2011)

RedOne singles chronology
"Kick Ass (We Are Young)" (2010)	"A-Ricky-Kee" (2014)

Music video
- "Kick Ass (We Are Young)" on YouTube

"Kick Ass (We Are Young)" is a song by British singer Mika and Moroccan-Swedish record producer RedOne released as a single from the soundtrack to the film Kick-Ass. It was released on 2 May 2010.

== Background ==
At the European premiere of Kick-Ass in London, Mika said:

I have never written a song for a movie, I've had songs in movies which is always weird, you know? When you see faces you've grown up with kind of walking down the street to one of your songs. Feels like they've stolen it! But this one, [the producers of Kick-Ass] called me in, they made me watch the movie and then gave me three days to write the song. So, I was slightly terrified...It's written completely for the film. I loved the film. It panders to all my weird obsessions and perversions. It's demented! It's wrong in every way, that's why it's so right.

— Mika

== Reception ==
Robert Copsey from Digital Spy gave the song four stars out of five saying the song's verses "have all the usual Mika ingredients – a handful of quirky lyrics, a dash of piano and a sprinkling of his trademark wail – and it's only when the chorus kicks in that we hear the RedOne effect." He also praised the collaboration saying it "actually works remarkably well, creating a pop stomper that's empowering, oh-so-contemporary and packed with personality". Contemporary music website Popjustice also gave the song a positive review, after what was seemingly going to be a negative one, they ended it with "Guess what – 'Kick-Ass' is also AMAZING". However, the song has also been met with some criticism, with people pointing out that the chorus is very similar, lyrically, to that of "Young" by Hollywood Undead.

== Music video ==
The video for the single shows Mika as a helpless individual left in an alleyway after being mugged. He begins to sing and as he does, the words of empowerment in the lyrics and his finding of an issue of the "Kick-Ass" comic inspire him to run for the rooftops and wail the chorus to the sky, now dressed in a slightly more superhero version of his "original persona" outfit. As is the norm with most soundtrack singles, the video features intercut scenes from the film. It was shot at Black Island Studios, London.

== Track listing ==
- Digital download
1. "Kick Ass (We Are Young)" – 3:14
2. "I See You" – 4:16
3. "Blame It on the Girls" (live from the iTunes Festival 2009) – 3:27
4. "Kick Ass (We Are Young)" (music video)
- CD single
1. "Kick Ass (We Are Young)" (Cutmore Vocal Mix) – 5:58
2. "Kick Ass (We Are Young)" (Cutmore Dub) – 6:01
3. "Kick Ass (We Are Young)" (Cutmore Radio Edit) – 3:24

== Chart performance ==
The song received very little airplay in the UK, resulting in a low peak position, but in Ireland, where it received a substantial amount of airplay, it charted at number seven. In Italy, it peaked at number five and it was certified platinum by the Federazione Industria Musicale Italiana, for digital sales exceeding 30,000 units.

=== Weekly charts ===
Weekly chart performance
Chart (2010)	Peak position
Austria (Ö3 Austria Top 40)	54
Belgium (Ultratop 50 Flanders)	8
Belgium (Ultratop 50 Wallonia)	5
Belgian Airplay (Ultratop Wallonia)	3
Czech Republic (Rádio Top 100 Oficiální)	21
Germany (GfK)	54
Ireland (IRMA)	7
Italy (FIMI)	5
Italy Airplay (EarOne)	14
Netherlands (Tipparade)	5
Switzerland (Schweizer Hitparade)	56
UK Singles (Official Charts)	84
US Dance Club Songs (Billboard)	13

=== Year-end charts ===
Chart (2010)	Position
Belgium (Ultratop Flanders)	55
Belgium (Ultratop Wallonia)	39
Italy (FIMI)	35
Italy Airplay (EarOne)	53
