= Happy Ending (Mika song) =

2007 single by Mika

Single by Mika

from the album Life in Cartoon Motion
- Released: 15 October 2007
- Recorded: 2006
- Genre: Pop
- Length: 3:32 (LA edit); 4:36 (album version)
- Label: Island
- Songwriter: Michael Holbrook Penniman Jr.
- Producer: Greg Wells

Mika singles chronology
| "Big Girl (You Are Beautiful)" (2007) | "Happy Ending" (2007) | "Lollipop" (2007) |

Music video
- "Happy Ending" on YouTube

"Happy Ending" is the third single release from Lebanese-British singer Mika. Taken from his debut album Life in Cartoon Motion, producer Greg Wells remixed and rearranged the single, released online on 8 October 2007, and in shops on CD and 7-inch vinyl on 15 October 2007.

The single charted as Mika's fourth straight UK Top 10 single out of his first four, continuing his UK success so far, peaking at number seven on the UK Singles Chart. It was the fifth most added song to Australian radio in late October 2007 and was released there officially on 12 November 2007, as the 3rd single despite digital track sales placing the song in the ARIA singles chart before the official release.

On Life in Cartoon Motion, fifty seconds after the song ends, a hidden track, "Over My Shoulder" starts. It is a solemn song about being left alone, cold and drunk. This also appeared on the CD single of "Grace Kelly".

== Background and composition ==
Mika described the story behind the song:

It's about a few things. In a way, it's a kind of sad break-up song like 'My Interpretation'. But, at the same time, it's about a lot of other things. I'll never forget when I was actually recording this song in Los Angeles, I would take this drive from where I was staying to the studio, which wasn't in the city and the amount of homeless people I saw on the way was absolutely shocking. Those horrible images of homelessness that I would see every morning really connected with that song. So it just comes to show you that a bright song in a certain mindset had a meaning that really evolves and changes as time goes by. I think that it is very important that other listeners find their own meaning to songs. So many people are very openly suggestive to the point of being abstract. It's the most powerful thing when that becomes the song.

The woman singing with Mika in “Happy Ending” on the album is Ida Falk Winland, an opera singer and former classmate of Mika from the Royal College of Music.

== Critical reception ==
The song received critical acclaim. Christian John Wikane from PopMatters commented about his voice on the track, writing that "Like a choirboy singing by candlelight, Mika awakes goose bumps with the chilling purity of his voice." Graham Griffith from About.com was succinct, writing that the song is "gorgeous", while Lizzie Ennever from BBC Music described it as a "lovely, piano-led" song.

John Murphy from musicOMH wrote an extense article about the song. He wrote that it "sees a wonderful vocal performance from Mika, sounding eerily like early Michael Jackson at one point, and working extraordinarily well with his backing vocals. It's the sort of song you can imagine playing over the final scene of an 'emotional' drama on TV."

== Music video ==
The music video starts with a piano playing on its own, then the camera shows Mika on the bed. He is singing and has a pink balloon attached on his arm and while he is floating above, it reveals Mika with a pink suit. His room walls are shown full of pictures that start moving their mouths and singing with Mika. Mika passes through white balloons, which show all the times he felt different emotions. The video ends with Mika singing, and gloved hands resembling singing faces. He smiles as the screen goes black. The music video was directed by AlexandLiane.

== Popular culture ==
- The song was featured on The CW shows Gossip Girl (2007–2012) and Privileged (2008–2009). The song was also used in the season and series finale for another The CW show, Hellcats, in 2011.
- The song was used for a contemporary dance performed by Natalli and Vincent on So You Think You Can Dance Canada in 2008.
- The song was used in a commercial for Kookmin Bank.
- The song could often be heard on The X Factor in the UK after 2007 during the audition rounds.
- A cappella group Noteworthy chose the song as their Swan Song on NBC's The Sing-Off in 2009
- The instrumental version of the song was featured in the second series of Supersize vs Superskinny in 2009.
- Part of the song was featured in The Axis of Awesome's 2011 song "Four Chords", as an example of a song that uses the I–V–vi–IV progression.
- The song was featured in a Pantene shampoo and conditioner advertisement in 2010, and until 2012 in Asia.
- The song was used in a 2015 campaign for Si by Giorgio Armani featuring Cate Blanchett.

== Track listings ==
UK CD single

1. "Happy Ending" (LA Edit) – 3:32
2. "Grace Kelly" (Acoustic) – 3:04
3. "Happy Ending" (The Kleerup Mix) – 4:16

Limited-edition 7-inch vinyl

1. "Happy Ending" (LA Edit) – 3:32
2. "Love Today" (Acoustic) – 2:57

UK 12-inch single

1. "Happy Ending" (Quentin Harris Remix) – 8:32
2. "Happy Ending" (Quentin Harris Instrumental) – 8:14
3. "Happy Ending" (This Time Of Night Remix) – 5:40
4. "Happy Ending" (Trail Mix) – 4:20

== Charts ==
=== Weekly charts ===
| Chart (2007–2008) | Peak position |
|---|---|
| Australia (ARIA) | 7 |
| Austria (Ö3 Austria Top 40) | 29 |
| Belgium (Ultratop 50 Flanders) | 11 |
| Belgium (Ultratop 50 Wallonia) | 26 |
| Czech Republic Airplay (ČNS IFPI) | 70 |
| European Hot 100 Singles (Billboard) | 25 |
| Germany (GfK) | 28 |
| Hungary (Editors' Choice Top 40) | 26 |
| Hungary (Single Top 40) | 6 |
| Ireland (IRMA) | 29 |
| Italy (FIMI) | 12 |
| Netherlands (Dutch Top 40) | 10 |
| Netherlands (Single Top 100) | 15 |
| Slovakia Airplay (ČNS IFPI) | 1 |
| Switzerland (Schweizer Hitparade) | 10 |
| UK Singles (OCC) | 7 |
| UK Airplay (Music Week) | 8 |

| Chart (2016) | Peak position |
|---|---|
| France (SNEP) | 66 |

=== Year-end charts ===
| Chart (2007) | Position |
|---|---|
| Australia (ARIA) | 69 |
| UK Singles (OCC) | 86 |

| Chart (2008) | Position |
|---|---|
| Australia (ARIA) | 97 |
| Belgium (Ultratop 50 Flanders) | 47 |
| Belgium (Ultratop 50 Wallonia) | 84 |
| Netherlands (Dutch Top 40) | 49 |
| Netherlands (Single Top 100) | 99 |
| Switzerland (Schweizer Hitparade) | 51 |

== Certifications ==
| Region | Certification | Certified units/sales |
|---|---|---|
| Australia (ARIA) | Gold | 35,000^{^} |
| Italy (FIMI) | Gold | 15,000^{‡} |
| United Kingdom (BPI) | Platinum | 600,000^{‡} |
^{^} Shipments figures based on certification alone.^{‡} Sales+streaming figures based on certification alone.
