= Lollipop (Mika song) =

Single by Mika

from the album Life in Cartoon Motion
- B-side: "Relax, Take It Easy"
- Released: 31 December 2007
- Genre: Bubblegum pop
- Length: 3:03
- Label: Island
- Songwriter: Michael Holbrook Penniman Jr.
- Producer: Greg Wells

Mika singles chronology
"Happy Ending" (2007)	"Lollipop" (2007)	"We Are Golden" (2009)

Music video
- "Lollipop" on YouTube

"Lollipop" is a song by Mika from his 2007 debut album, Life in Cartoon Motion. When the album was released, "Lollipop" had high numbers of downloads, even before it had been released as a single, charting in the Top 75 UK Singles Chart. In April 2007, it was released to radio in the UK, Norway, Switzerland, and Australia. On 31 December 2007, it was released as a double A-side single with "Relax, Take It Easy" in the UK. The single was available for digital download on 24 December 2007.

Mika has said in interviews that the song was written as a message to his younger sister. The single performed moderately in the UK Singles Chart considering that it was released as a fifth single from Life in Cartoon Motion, peaking at number 18 as an A-side to the double-A-side single "Relax, Take It Easy".

== Background and writing ==
Mika wrote the song as a message to his younger sister, warning her not to have sex too soon as it would "mean something very different to guys than it would to her".

The little girl who appears at the beginning saying, "Hey! What's the big idea?" and again saying the "I went walking..." part is Mika's cousin, Audrey Moukataff.

== Critical reception ==
The song received mixed reviews from music critics. Alexander Berntsen from Sputnikmusic said that the track is "just funny to listen to. You're bound to be smiling by the end of the song". Craig McLean from The Guardian wrote that the song is "terrific kiddie boogie destined for a slot on CBeebies."

However, Mika's voice was criticised by Heather Phares from AllMusic, who wrote that on the song, Mika "straddles the line between adorable and annoying". Sal Cinquemani from Slant Magazine commented that the song "features a sick-sweet falsetto hook that is, perhaps, irony-free". Alex Fletcher from Digital Spy was direct, writing that "with candyfloss-sweet pop melodies and more high-pitched Mika vocal action than should be allowed by Government law, the song is intensely irritating".

== Chart performance ==
At the beginning of 2007, the chart rules were changed to allow downloads to be eligible for the chart with or without a physical equivalent. On 11 February, "Lollipop" became the first track from a newly released album that wasn't a single to register enough sales to enter the Top 75, charting at number 62. By 18 April 2008, the single had sold 66,594 copies in the UK.

== Music video ==
The animated music video for "Lollipop" was released in November 2007. It is a parody of Little Red Riding Hood, and features the "Lollipop Girl" walking around a colourful land based around the album art of Life in Cartoon Motion. The music video was originally set to contain a drawn version of Mika singing, but plans were scrapped. It was released by the name of "Lollipop 16:9 Bunny Action" on the internet. Passion Pictures’ Paris-based studio gathered 5 young French animators under the name Bonzom to create the video.

== Track listing ==
UK CD1

1. "Relax, Take It Easy" (Radio Edit)
2. "Lollipop" (Live from L'Olympia Paris)
3. "I Want You Back" (Live from L'Olympia Paris)
4. "Relax, Take It Easy" (Dennis Christopher Remix) (Radio Edit)
5. "Lollipop" (Fred Deakin's Fredmix)

UK CD2

1. "Relax, Take It Easy" (New Radio Edit)
2. "Lollipop"

Limited edition USB memory stick

1. "Relax, Take It Easy" (New Radio Edit)
2. "Lollipop"
3. "Relax, Take It Easy" (Alpha Beat Remix)
4. "Relax, Take It Easy" (Frank Musik Mix)
5. "Relax, Take It Easy" (Ashley Beedle's Castro Vocal Discomix)
6. "Relax, Take It Easy" (Video - Live in Paris) (5.1 Surround)
7. "Lollipop" (Video - 16:9 Bunny Action)

== In other media ==
This song is a playable track in the video game Just Dance 3. The song was also covered a cappella in the 2015 film Pitch Perfect 2.

The song was featured in the 16 February 2019 episode of Saturday Night Live, in a sketch performed by Don Cheadle and Beck Bennett as two men who want to start a bar fight with Lollipop playing on the jukebox.

== Charts ==
=== Weekly charts ===
Chart (2008)	Peak position
Austria (Ö3 Austria Top 40)	51
Belgium (Ultratop 50 Flanders)	24
Belgium (Ultratop 50 Wallonia)	21
European Hot 100 Singles (Billboard)	100
Germany (GfK)	35
Netherlands (Dutch Top 40)	13
Netherlands (Single Top 100)	20
Norway (VG-lista)	19
Sweden (Sverigetopplistan)	13
Switzerland (Schweizer Hitparade)	58
UK Singles (OCC)	59

=== Year-end charts ===
Chart (2007)	Position
UK Singles (OCC)	169

Chart (2008)	Position
Netherlands (Dutch Top 40)	66

== Certifications ==
Region	Certification	Certified units/sales
United Kingdom (BPI)	Gold	400,000^{‡}
^{‡} Sales+streaming figures based on certification alone.
