= Big Girl (You Are Beautiful) =

2007 single by Mika

Single by Mika

from the album Life in Cartoon Motion
- B-side: "Instant Martyr"
- Released: 23 July 2007
- Genre: Disco-pop
- Length: 4:10 (album version); 3:09 (radio edit)
- Label: Island
- Songwriters: Mika; Jodi Marr; John Merchant; Andres Orue; Dan Warner
- Producer: Greg Wells

Mika singles chronology
"Love Today" (2007)	"Big Girl (You Are Beautiful)" (2007)	"Happy Ending" (2007)

Music video
- "Big Girl (You Are Beautiful)" on YouTube

"Big Girl (You Are Beautiful)" is the fourth single from the debut album Life in Cartoon Motion of singer Mika. It reached number 9 in the UK charts after it was released on 23 July 2007. It was inspired by, and written for, the Butterfly Lounge, the first Size Acceptance nightclub in Orange County, California. The club is mentioned specifically in the lyrics "Get yourself to the Butterfly Lounge. Find yourself a big lady", and is now their theme song. A B-side of the single is "Standing in the Way of Control".

The song was met with mixed reviews from music critics. The song peaked at number 9 in the United Kingdom (his third top 10 hit in that country), and reached the top ten in Ireland, Finland, Austria, Belgium and the Netherlands.

== Background and writing ==
Many people speculate that Mika wrote the song as a tribute to Queen's "Fat Bottomed Girls", but in promotional materials for Life in Cartoon Motion, he states that this is not the case at all:

"I was flying to Los Angeles the next day and I can never sleep because I hate flying so much. So I was watching trashy television, it was two o'clock in the morning, a Victoria Wood documentary on Channel 4. It was about fat people in the United States and she visited a club called The Butterfly Lounge, which was the first place of its kind, a club for larger women to hang out in. Skinny women were not being allowed in. The women were amazing and I absolutely felt as if I had to write about them. I muted the television and wrote it straight away. I never expected it on the album, but a few weeks later we recorded it and it's now there. So it is one of my favourite tracks and brilliant to play live. Everyone sings along!"

The song features Afro-pop-inspired guitars and harmonies.

== Critical reception ==
The song received mostly mixed reviews from music critics. Beth Johnson from Entertainment Weekly referred to the song as "an update of Queen's 'Fat Bottomed Girls'." Sal Cinquemani from Slant Magazine agreed, writing that the song "is nothing if not a disco-fied exaltation to Queen's 'Fat Bottomed Girls'." John Murphy from musicOMH wrote a negative review, saying that the song is "an ode to the delights of the larger lady, wraps up its laudable message inside a tune that grates in the worst possible way." Graham Griffith from About.com wrote that "the disco-lite 'Big Girl (You Are Beautiful),' which includes an admirable sentiment, fails to distinguish itself otherwise." Liz Colville from Pitchfork said that it is "a pumping, chorus-infested jam session complete with gospel backup singers that tragically feels the need to reassure big girls they can be beautiful."

Lizzie Ennever from BBC Music wrote a positive review, saying that the track is "upbeat, poppy, all-singing, all-dancing, big-band." Alexander Berntsen from Sputnikmusic wrote a positive review, saying that the song is "an incredibly fun (and happy!) tune, a genius moment. Hilarious indeed."

== Music video ==
The video was filmed on 19 May 2007 in Croydon and features several plus size women dancing down Croydon High Street, Surrey Street Market, and outside Croydon College in corsets and short dresses. The finale of the video features a whole gathering of curvy women celebrating.

== In pop culture ==
Mika has also rerecorded the track as the promo theme for the second season of the American comedy-drama series Ugly Betty, but with altered lyrics to say "Hey, Betty, you are beautiful" in its chorus. Mika explained to the Sun newspaper: "Betty is a real fashion icon and we should celebrate anyone like her – genuine individuals who stay true to their own identity. That's what 'Big Girl' is all about so it was the perfect fit to change the song for her. It was a huge honor to be asked to do it. I love the show." In Australia, Crazy John TV advertisements used a sample of this song. In Spain, the Galician TV station Televisión de Galicia used samples of this song in the show O show dos Tonechos. The song is featured in the Ubisoft video game Just Dance 2 (2010).

== Track listing ==
UK CD single

1. "Big Girl (You Are Beautiful)" – 4:10
2. "Instant Martyr"
3. "Sweet Dreams (Are Made of This)" (Live)
4. "Big Girl (You Are Beautiful)" (Tom Middleton Remix) – 5:52

Limited edition 7" single

1. "Big Girl (You Are Beautiful)" – 4:10
2. "Standing in the Way of Control" (Live) (From Radio 1's Big Weekend)

UK 12" vinyl

1. "Big Girl (You Are Beautiful)" (Tom Middleton Remix) – 5:52
2. "Big Girl (You Are Beautiful)" (Bonde Do Role Remix) – 3:48
3. "Big Girl (You Are Beautiful)" (Lo-Fi-Fnk Remix) – 6:12
4. "Big Girl (You Are Beautiful)" (Hick Nurdman Remix) – 5:44

== Charts ==
=== Weekly charts ===
Chart (2007–2008)	Peak position
Australia (ARIA)	23
Austria (Ö3 Austria Top 40)	8
Belgium (Ultratop 50 Flanders)	5
Belgium (Ultratop 50 Wallonia)	10
Canada Hot 100 (Billboard)	86
Czech Republic Airplay (ČNS IFPI)	46
Finland (Suomen virallinen lista)	5
Germany (GfK)	19
Hungary (Dance Top 40)	30
Hungary (Rádiós Top 40)	29
Ireland (IRMA)	9
Italy (FIMI)	47
Netherlands (Dutch Top 40)	4
Netherlands (Single Top 100)	6
Norway (VG-lista)	18
Scottish Singles Sales (Official Charts)	8
Slovakia Airplay (ČNS IFPI)	34
Sweden (Sverigetopplistan)	26
Switzerland (Schweizer Hitparade)	29
UK Singles (Official Charts)	9

=== Year-end charts ===
Chart (2007)	Position
Germany (Media Control GfK)	93
Netherlands (Dutch Top 40)	39
Netherlands (Single Top 100)	76
UK Singles (OCC)	79

Chart (2008)	Position
Australia (ARIA)	86
Belgium (Ultratop 50 Flanders)	33
Belgium (Ultratop 50 Wallonia)	42

== Certifications ==
Region	Certification	Certified units/sales
Australia (ARIA)	Gold	35,000^{^}
Belgium (BRMA)	Gold	25,000^{*}
United Kingdom (BPI)	Gold	400,000^{‡}
^{*} Sales figures based on certification alone.^{^} Shipments figures based on certification alone.^{‡} Sales+streaming figures based on certification alone.
