= Love Today (song) =

2007 single by Mika

Single by Mika

from the album Life in Cartoon Motion
- Released: 23 April 2007
- Genre: Disco-pop
- Length: 3:57 (album version); 3:22 (radio edit)
- Label: Universal; Island; Casablanca
- Songwriter: Mika
- Producer: Greg Wells

Mika singles chronology
"Grace Kelly" (2007)	"Love Today" (2007)	"Big Girl (You Are Beautiful)" (2007)

Music video
- "Love Today" on YouTube

"Love Today" is the second single released by London-based singer Mika, taken from his debut studio album, Life in Cartoon Motion (2007). The song was produced by Greg Wells at Rocket Carousel studios and engineered by Drew Pearson. It was released in the United Kingdom on 16 April 2007 as a digital download, with the official physical release appearing on 23 April 2007, and peaked at number six on the UK Singles Chart. The single was released in Australia on 23 July 2007, reaching number three on the ARIA Singles Chart, and was used for Austereo radio station network advertising. The song was nominated for a Grammy for Best Dance Recording at the 50th Grammy Awards but lost to Justin Timberlake's "LoveStoned/I Think She Knows".

== Background and composition ==
Love Today was written by Mika and produced by Greg Wells. He described the story behind the song in an interview with the Sun Newspaper, on 2 February 2007:

"I was really happy when I wrote this and when I'm in that kind of mood I always hope everyone else feels the same way. Everybody is looking for the same thing - to love someone and be loved back. Or just to get laid. It all depends on how you look for it. 'Love Today' captures that, the euphoric feeling you get when those things go right."

Mika revealed to The Times, on 20 November 2009 that the song came fully formed "after the first time I had sleepy with somebody and actually loved it."

== Critical reception ==
The song received mixed reviews from music critics. Heather Phares from AllMusic wrote that on the song "Mika straddles the line between adorable and annoying." John Murphy from musicOMH agreed, writing that his voice is "infuriating" on the track. In the same vein, Graham Griffith from About.com wrote that the song "finds itself hijacked by Mika's otherwise appealing falsetto, which morphs into an unflattering shriek and transforms the song into something altogether intolerable." Writing for Digital Spy, Nick Levine called the song's chorus a "lost disco classic" and noted that Mika performs the track with similar enthusiasm displayed by the Scissor Sisters.

Christian John Mikane from PopMatters wrote that the song is "sincere." Mikane further added that "The pop-disco arrangement of 'Love Today' dresses Mika in legwarmers and leotards; it's the kind of song you'd expect the TV cast of Fame to perform mid-episode. Frankly, it's refreshing to hear an unproven artist take risks with material that, historically, is subject to derision." Lizzie Ennever from BBC Music wrote a positive review, saying that the song is "another winner - truly funky disco-pop that has you shoulder-shimmying non-stop, and even though you hate yourself for enjoying it, you simply can't stop yourself having a great time whilst you listen." Craig McLean from The Observer called it "turbo-funk falsetto fun genetically modified to lay waste to hen nights and Freshers' Balls from Dundee to Dungeness."

== Track listings ==
UK CD single

1. "Love Today"
2. "The Only Lonely One" (demo)
3. "Billy Brown" (acoustic)
4. "Love Today" (Switch remix)

UK 7-inch single

A. "Love Today" (album version)
B. "Stuck in the Middle" (acoustic version)

UK 12-inch single

1. "Love Today" (Switch remix)
2. "Love Today" (Rob Mello No Ears vocal)
3. "Love Today" (Rob Mello No Ears dub)

== Charts ==
=== Weekly charts ===
Chart (2007–2008)	Peak position
Australia (ARIA)	3
Belgium (Ultratop 50 Flanders)	4
Belgium (Ultratop 50 Wallonia)	3
Canada Hot 100 (Billboard)	58
Canada CHR/Top 40 (Billboard)	45
CIS Airplay (TopHit)	66
Czech Republic Airplay (ČNS IFPI)	50
Europe (Eurochart Hot 100)	18
Finland (Suomen virallinen lista)	9
France (SNEP)	5
Hungary (Editors' Choice Top 40)	36
Ireland (IRMA)	13
Italy (FIMI)	5
Netherlands (Dutch Top 40)	25
Netherlands (Single Top 100)	90
New Zealand (Recorded Music NZ)	28
Russia Airplay (TopHit)	66
Scottish Singles Sales (Official Charts)	4
Slovakia Airplay (ČNS IFPI)	24
Sweden (Sverigetopplistan)	17
Switzerland (Schweizer Hitparade)	46
UK Singles (Official Charts)	6
Ukraine Airplay (TopHit)	92
US Billboard Hot 100	92
US Dance Club Songs (Billboard)	2
US Pop 100 (Billboard)	78

=== Year-end charts ===
Chart (2007)	Position
Australia (ARIA)	23
Belgium (Ultratop 50 Flanders)	35
Belgium (Ultratop 50 Wallonia)	22
Europe (Eurochart Hot 100)	46
France (SNEP)	51
UK Singles (OCC)	62
US Dance Club Play (Billboard)	21

== Certifications ==
Region	Certification	Certified units/sales
Australia (ARIA)	Platinum	70,000^{^}
Belgium (BRMA)	Gold	25,000^{*}
United Kingdom (BPI)	Silver	200,000^{‡}
^{*} Sales figures based on certification alone.^{^} Shipments figures based on certification alone.^{‡} Sales+streaming figures based on certification alone.

== Release history ==
Region	Date	Format	Label(s)	Ref.
United Kingdom	23 April 2007	CD	Universal; Island; Casablanca	
Australia	23 July 2007	CD	Universal; Island; Casablanca	

== In popular culture ==
"Love Today" was used by Motorola for online and mobile-phone spots in its RED campaign in early 2007. The song could also be heard in an ad for Motorola RED that featured comic Chris Kattan dancing that was shown before movie trailers in theaters at this time.

The song was also used as the background music during the National Costume and Opening Presentation of Miss Universe 2008 held in Nha Trang, Vietnam. A portion of this song was used as a background song in a TV commercial for Indonesian isotonic drink Mizone in 2010. It also featured as background music in the first episode of The Shrink Next Door when they are at Dr. Ike's party at the Hamptons house.

"Love Today" has also been featured in a number of films including Get Him to the Greek, Sammy's Adventures: The Secret Passage and Monte Carlo.

"Love Today" was featured on commercials of the Chilean department stores chain Corona on 2011 for its new logo.
