= Grace Kelly (song) =

2007 single by Mika

Single by Mika

from the album Life in Cartoon Motion
- B-side: "Over My Shoulder"; "Satellite"
- Released: 8 January 2007
- Recorded: 2006
- Genre: Glam rock; pop rock
- Length: 3:05
- Label: Casablanca; IRG
- Songwriters: Michael Penniman; Jodi Marr; John Merchant; Dan Warner
- Producer: Greg Wells

Mika singles chronology
"Relax, Take It Easy" (2007)	"Grace Kelly" (2007)	"Love Today" (2007)

Music video
- "Grace Kelly" on YouTube

"Grace Kelly" is a song by British singer Mika. It was released as the lead single from Mika's debut studio album Life in Cartoon Motion (2007) on 8 January 2007. It was written by Mika alongside Jodi Marr, John Merchant and Dan Warner. The song was produced and mixed by Greg Wells.

The song entered the UK Singles Chart at number three and the UK Official Download Chart at number one. One week later, it jumped to the top of the UK Singles Chart on download sales alone, the second song to do so after Gnarls Barkley's "Crazy" the previous year. The track was number one on the UK Singles Chart for five weeks, and ended 2007 as the year's third biggest-selling single in that country. In the US, "Grace Kelly" was made available for digital download on 16 January 2007. This song was also No. 89 on MTV Asia's list of Top 100 Hits of 2007. It was designed to be a mocking satire of musicians who try to reinvent themselves to be popular.

The song is titled after Academy Award-winning American film and stage actress, and Princess of Monaco, Grace Kelly. The fragment of dialogue used in the song is from the film The Country Girl, which stars Kelly. Mika claims the song was inspired after a bad experience with a record company executive, in which he was told to be more like Craig David. The lyrics also reference Queen frontman Freddie Mercury, to whose singing voice Mika's has been compared. On at least one occasion, Mika confirmed that he used the main melody from Figaro's famous aria "Largo al factotum", from the opera The Barber of Seville by Gioachino Rossini. Mika performed the song at the MTV Europe Music Awards 2007 in Munich and at the 2008 BRIT Awards at the Earls Court Exhibition Centre, London, where it was nominated for Best British Single, but lost to "Shine" by Take That. The song has sold over 1.8 million copies in the UK, as stated by the Official Charts Company.

== Background and composition ==
"The comparisons to Freddie Mercury are fine. They started long before I made the record – I've even referred to it in Grace Kelly." "Grace Kelly was written after these musicians were trying to mould me into what I should be. I was really angry and so I wrote the song and mailed them the lyrics. They didn't call me back, but two years later it's come full circle."

— Mika says in an interview on the BBC.

Mika wrote the song after he felt frustrated with record label executives that wanted him to change his sound to fit the common pop mould. In the song, Mika points out how he can pretend to be anyone he likes to win approval – in this case the glamorous actress Grace Kelly. He wrote the song after the record company told him that they wanted to model his look and sound on Craig David, who was popular at the time in the UK. Mika rejected this idea and wrote "Grace Kelly" as a way of expressing his individuality. The song's melody is based on the aria "Largo al factotum", from the opera The Barber of Seville by Gioachino Rossini. The song is in the key of G major throughout.

== Critical reception ==
The song received positive reviews from music critics. Heather Phares from AllMusic wrote a positive review for the song, stating that "Mika's singles are his most charming moments, including the instant sunshine of "Grace Kelly," which crams tap-dancing rhythms, filmic dialogue, Elton's pianos, Freddie's vocal harmonies, and Brian May's guitars into just over three minutes." Christian John Wikane from PopMatters wrote an extensive article about the comparisons between Mika and Freddie Mercury, writing that "he sounds a lot like Mercury and wears the influence like a badge of honor, even name-checking the late front man of Queen in the first verse. Mika vacillates between the affected theatricality of Mercury's full-throttled voice and his own strong falsetto, where he earnestly implores 'Why don't you like me?' no less than 12 times."

Beth Johnson from Entertainment Weekly wrote that "Nothing quite matches the crystal-shattering exuberance of hit Grace Kelly." John Murphy from musicOMH wrote that "It's big, joyous, dumb pop, and the only danger with it is that you'll be utterly sick of it fast." Lizzie Enever from BBC Music was direct, writing that "Grace Kelly is a great pop song – it's catchy, you can't help singing along and it grates on you after a few days when you can't get it out of your head but you still go back for more – flawless credentials." Graham Griffith, also from About.com, wrote that the song "is an outrageously irresistible and infectious pop gem." Dom Passantino from Stylus Magazine criticized the track, writing that "it seems to suggest the boy has some level for musicals, being as it is all Broadway flittering and hackneyed attempts at conveying a story with its lyrics. But here's the problem: he's got no tales to tell, just a tab at his local make-up supplier. 'Am I too dirty, am I too flirty?' he sings at one point."

== Accolades ==
At the 2007 World Music Awards, Mika won for Best Selling British Artist, Best Selling New Artist, Best Selling Male Entertainer, and World's Best Selling Pop Rock Male Artist.

== Live performances and covers ==
- Top 50 contestant of American Idol Josiah Leming performed a rendition of the song in Hollywood for the judges, which received great praise.
- A version by Mika appears on the 2007 compilation album The Saturday Sessions: The Dermot O'Leary Show.
- Mika performed this song on series 4 episode 3 of The Friday Night Project on 19 January 2007. James Nesbitt was the host that night.
- The Whiffenpoofs performed the song on The Sing-Off on 6 December 2010.
- Bindi Irwin and Derek Hough performed the song on Dancing with the Stars (U.S. season 21)
- Josef Fečo performed the song on The Voice Česko Slovensko on 1 March 2019
- In September 2021, TikTok users, including Ryan Reynolds and Will Ferrell, took part in a challenge where the user records the different vocal parts of the chorus (which spans a thirteenth, a whole step wider than "The Star-Spangled Banner") on top of each other making a full harmony.
- In May 2022, Mika performed this song as part of the interval medley at the Eurovision Song Contest 2022, which he co-hosted.

== Parodies ==
- Rory Bremner recorded a parody version to illustrate the problems of UK Prime Minister Gordon Brown.
- Amateur Transplants's song "Libel Case" from their 2008 album Unfit to Practise.
- Subwoolfer released a parody song of Mika's "Grace Kelly" titled "Space Kelly"; a parody Eurovision round-up song of their competitors and making light of their true identities.

== Music video ==
The music video for the song "Grace Kelly" was directed by Sophie Muller and starred Mika and future singer Mae Muller, who is Sophie's niece. The video was filmed in early November 2006 and has been nominated for numerous worldwide awards. The instrumental introduction in the video is an extract of the acoustic version of the song found on certain releases of the album. The video premiered on MTV on 15 January 2007.

== Official versions ==
- "Grace Kelly" – 3:07
- "Grace Kelly" (Acoustic Version) – 3:07
- "Grace Kelly" (Bimbo Jones Remix Edit) – 3:00
- "Grace Kelly" (Bimbo Jones Remix) – 6:26
- "Grace Kelly" (Les Grandes Gueules Version) – 3:07
- "Grace Kelly" (Linus Loves Radio Edit) – 3:20
- "Grace Kelly" (Linus Loves Full Vocal Remix) – 6:46
- "Grace Kelly" (Linus Loves Dub Remix) – 6:40
- "Grace Kelly" (Pull Tiger Tail Remix) – 4:26
- "Grace Kelly" (Tom Neville Full Vocal Remix) – 6:48
- "Grace Kelly" (Tom Neville Dub Remix) – 7:08

== Chart performance ==
It reached number one in the United Kingdom and in Ireland. The song was only the second single ever to top the UK chart without selling a physical copy ("Crazy" by Gnarls Barkley was the first). In the US market, it peaked at number 57 on the Billboard Hot 100. The December 2007 Observer Music Monthly asked Mika how it felt getting to No. 1 in the UK with this song. He replied: "Very unreal. It still feels unreal. It's just a song I wrote in my room. By the time I'd written 'Grace Kelly' everything in my life had been called into question. Trying to find out what I was going to do with my life, trying to be a musician, to be independent, to give myself the remote chance of any kind of a relationship. I was just sorting every thing out in my head. That song sums it all up." It went to #1 on the United Kingdom, Czech Republic, Ireland, Italy, Norway and Turkey singles charts. The song was 82 in the French physical charts but number 2 in digital ones, and has more than 50,000 sales in the country. The song has more than 5 million sales.

== Charts ==
=== Weekly charts ===
Chart (2007)	Peak position
Australia (ARIA)	2
Austria (Ö3 Austria Top 40)	3
Belgium (Ultratop 50 Flanders)	2
Belgium (Ultratop 50 Wallonia)	1
Canada Hot 100 (Billboard)	3
Croatia (HRT)	2
Czech Republic Airplay (ČNS IFPI)	4
Denmark (Tracklisten)	1
Europe (Eurochart Hot 100)	2
Finland (Suomen virallinen lista)	5
France (SNEP)	82
Germany (GfK)	4
Hungary (Rádiós Top 40)	3
Ireland (IRMA)	1
Italy (FIMI)	1
Netherlands (Dutch Top 40)	4
Netherlands (Single Top 100)	4
New Zealand (Recorded Music NZ)	2
Norway (VG-lista)	1
Scottish Singles Sales (Official Charts)	1
Slovakia Airplay (ČNS IFPI)	4
Sweden (Sverigetopplistan)	9
Switzerland (Schweizer Hitparade)	2
UK Singles (Official Charts)	1
UK Airplay (Music Week)	1
US Billboard Hot 100	57
US Adult Alternative Airplay (Billboard)	12
US Adult Pop Airplay (Billboard)	26
US Dance Airplay (Billboard)	19
Venezuela Pop Rock (Record Report)	2

=== Year-end charts ===
Chart (2007)	Position
Australia (ARIA)	7
Austria (Ö3 Austria Top 40)	7
Belgium (Ultratop 50 Flanders)	4
Belgium (Ultratop 50 Wallonia)	1
European Hot 100 Singles (Billboard)	5
France (Airplay Chart)	81
Germany (Media Control GfK)	21
Hungary (Rádiós Top 40)	22
Ireland (IRMA)	3
Italy (FIMI)	5
Netherlands (Dutch Top 40)	6
Netherlands (Single Top 100)	7
New Zealand (RIANZ)	16
Sweden (Sverigetopplistan)	30
Switzerland (Schweizer Hitparade)	9
UK Singles (OCC)	3

=== Decade-end charts ===
Chart (2000–2009)	Position
UK Singles (OCC)	64

== Certifications ==
Region	Certification	Certified units/sales
Australia (ARIA)	Platinum	70,000^{^}
Belgium (BRMA)	Platinum	50,000^{*}
Denmark (IFPI Danmark)	Platinum	15,000^{^}
Germany (BVMI)	Gold	150,000^{^}
Italy (FIMI)	Platinum	50,000^{‡}
New Zealand (RMNZ)	2× Platinum	60,000^{‡}
Sweden (GLF)	Gold	10,000^{^}
Switzerland (IFPI Switzerland)	Gold	15,000^{^}
United Kingdom (BPI)	3× Platinum	1,800,000^{‡}
United States (RIAA)	Gold	500,000^{*}
^{*} Sales figures based on certification alone.^{^} Shipments figures based on certification alone.^{‡} Sales+streaming figures based on certification alone.

== Release history ==
Release dates and formats for "Grace Kelly"
Region	Date	Format	Label(s)	Ref.
United States	26 September 2006	Mainstream airplay	Universal Republic	

== Appearances ==
- The Hills
- Ugly Betty
- A Turkish Coca-Cola advertisement
- An Israeli advertisement of "Misdar Zihoi"
- A trailer for Disney Cinemagic
- A trailer for I Now Pronounce You Chuck and Larry
- A trailer for The Ugly Truth
- The 2008 episode of Silent Witness "Lost Child", as a 27-year-old transforms himself into a schoolboy
- An advertisement for Neighbours
- What Happens in Vegas...
- Dead Set
- The Doctor Who novel "The Pirate Loop"
- The Sarah Jane Adventures episode "The Mark of the Berserker"
- An episode of Celebrity Big Brother
- An advertisement of Confessions of a Shopaholic
- Autumn 2007 episodes of Corazón de Otoño
- The European Nintendo DS version of Band Hero
- A German first season trailer for Weeds
- The adult-oriented Wii game We Dare, as a cover version
- FC Barcelona's official video for Thierry Henry in Barca Legends series

== See also ==
- List of number-one hits in Denmark
- List of number-one singles of 2007 (Ireland)
- List of number-one hits of 2007 (Italy)
- List of number-one hits in Norway
- List of number-one singles from the 2000s (UK)
