= Greg Wells =

Canadian record producer

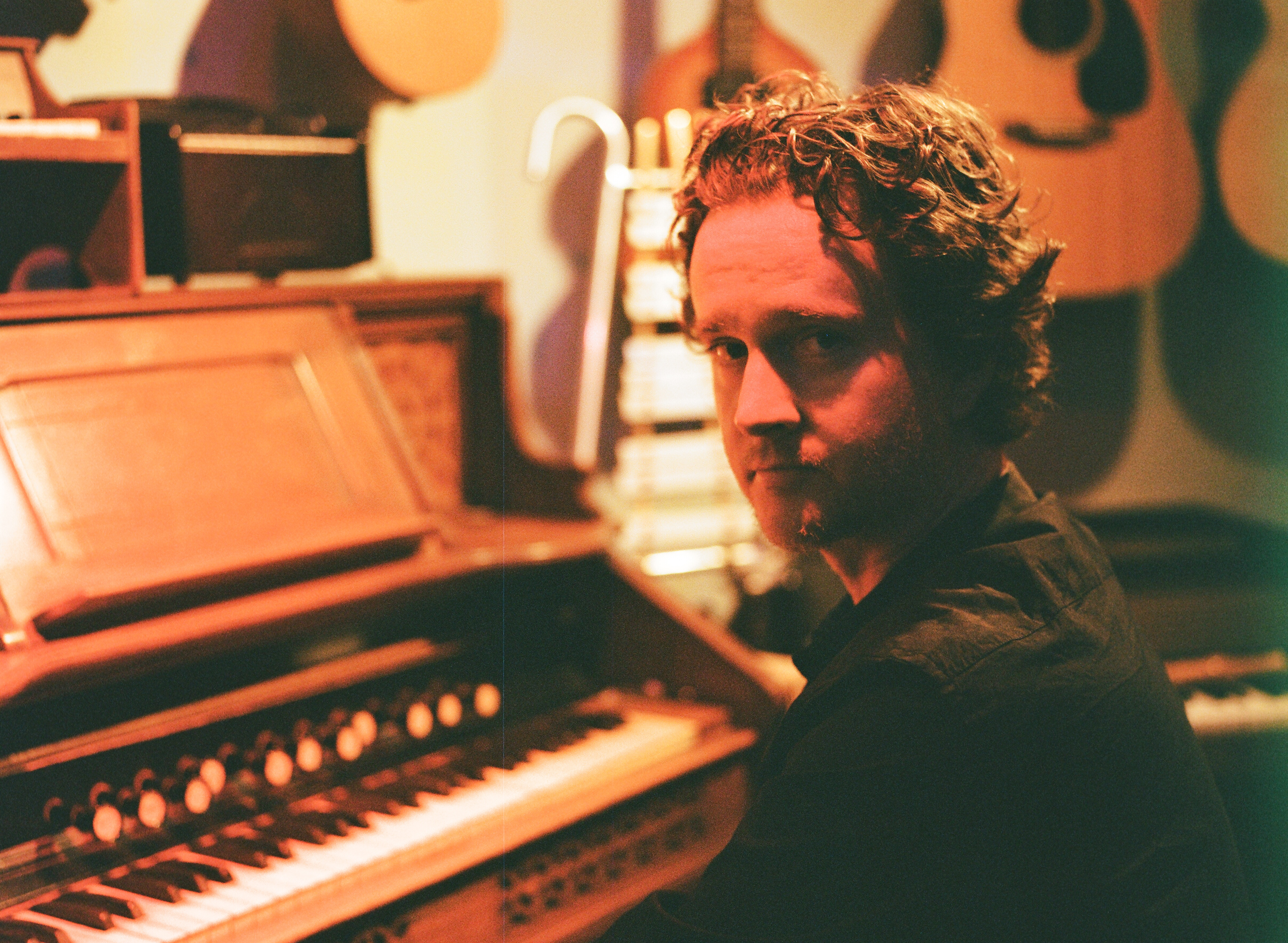

Background information
- Born: William Gregory Wells
- Origin: Peterborough, Ontario, Canada
- Genres: Rock; pop; jazz; classical
- Occupations: Record producer; audio engineer; songwriter; multi-instrumentalist
- Years active: 1998–present
- Spouse: Nina Woodford (m. 2013)

Greg Wells CM (born 1968) is a Grammy-winning and Oscar-nominated Canadian record producer, songwriter, multi-instrumentalist, and mix engineer. He has worked with Quincy Jones, Adele, Kid Cudi, Ariana Grande, Timbaland, Burt Bacharach, Cynthia Erivo, Lin-Manuel Miranda, Celine Dion, Rufus Wainwright, Taylor Swift, Michael Bublé, Ryan Tedder, OneRepublic, John Legend, Missy Elliott, Josh Groban, Pink, Mika, Aerosmith, Sir George Martin, Sir Andrew Lloyd Webber, Stephen Schwartz, Dua Lipa, Crash Test Dummies, Deftones, Katy Perry, Weezer, Otep, and Twenty One Pilots. Throughout his career, Wells has written or produced projects selling a cumulative 160 million units.

Appointed to the Order of Canada in 2026, Steinway and Sons named Wells as the newest official Steinway Artist in 2025, alongside Lang Lang, Cole Porter, Sergei Rachmaninoff, and Arthur Rubinstein. A classically and jazz trained multi-instrumentalist, Wells is featured as a drummer in Modern Drummer, as a pianist in Keyboard, as a synth programmer in Electronic Musician, as a songwriter in American Songwriter and Billboard, and as a producer, mix engineer, and musician on the cover of Mix with Ryan Tedder in the May 2017 edition.

Wells is known for his philanthropy supporting musicians globally, and his charitable work at Trinity Hall (Winterton, Newfoundland and Labrador) in Winterton, Newfoundland.

== Early life ==
Wells grew up in Peterborough, Ontario, Canada, the son of United Church of Canada Reverend Dr. Bill Wells. At age 11, he was in a wheelchair unable to walk for two years with Perthes' disease. Wells attended Adam Scott CVI, learned to play several instruments, and joined many musical ensembles in his hometown from the local orchestra to bar bands to being a church organist/choir director, as well as DJing dances and presenting a weekly radio show on Trent University Radio CFFF-FM. He studied classical piano, drums, pipe organ, orchestral percussion and music theory at Toronto's Royal Conservatory of Music. At age 15, Wells was awarded the top prize out of all categories in the Peterborough Kiwanis Music Festival, the Founders Award, and represented Peterborough twice at the Kiwanis Music Provincial Finals for the province of Ontario. At age 17, he attended the Humber College Jazz Music Program in Toronto as a piano major.

== Career ==
After moving from Peterborough to Toronto at age 17, Wells worked as a live and studio musician with Canadian musicians Rob McConnell and Kim Mitchell. He joined Kim Mitchell's band at age 19. Wells recorded keyboards and backing vocals on Mitchell's Rockland, toured Canada several times with the band, and won the award for Best Keyboardist at the 1990 Toronto Music Awards.

Wells was awarded a Canada Council arts grant to study in California with Terry Trotter, pianist for guitarist Larry Carlton and Frank Sinatra, and Clare Fischer, composer and string arranger for Prince. He traveled to Los Angeles at age 21 with the intention of returning to Canada, but Trotter and Fischer began recommending Wells as a pianist. Wells joined k.d. lang's band soon afterward, performing with her on the 1993 Grammy Awards where she won Best Pop Female Vocal.

His first recorded song as a songwriter was with Aerosmith on the double platinum Nine Lives, followed by "The Reason" on Celine Dion's 31-million-selling album, Let's Talk About Love. DreamWorks executive Lenny Waronker tapped Wells in 2001 to produce Rufus Wainwright. Songwriter Kara DioGuardi started collaborating with Wells in 2003. Wells then produced, mixed and played most of the instruments on Mika's 6-million-selling number 1 debut album Life in Cartoon Motion.

In 2007, Wells produced both Timbaland's and OneRepublic's version of the song "Apologize". The song ranked number 50 on the list of the Billboard Hot 100's All-Time Top Songs list from the chart's first 50 years. It stayed at number one for eight consecutive weeks on the Billboard Pop 100 chart, and spent 25 consecutive weeks in the top 10. It was ranked number 10 on the Billboard Hot 100 Songs of the Decade.

Wells co-produced an album with Burt Bacharach in 2011 titled When Ronan Met Burt, featuring Irish star Ronan Keating singing a collection of Bacharach's iconic songs.

In 2012, Wells and T-Bone Burnett produced and wrote with Kid Cudi a song titled "The Ruler and the Killer" for The Hunger Games: Songs from District 12 and Beyond, the best-selling soundtrack album of 2012.

The biggest-selling worldwide album of 2018 The Greatest Showman: Original Motion Picture Soundtrack was produced and mixed by Wells. The song "This Is Me" received an Oscar nomination for Best Song, and Keala Settle performed the song on the 2018 Academy Awards.

In 2020, Wells produced and mixed the Diane Warren song "Io sì (Seen)" which won numerous awards including Best Original Song at the Golden Globes, Song of the Year at the Capri Hollywood International Film Festival, Best International Song at the CinEuphoria Awards, Master in Music Award at the Los Angeles Italia Film Festival, Outstanding Song – Feature Film at the 11th Hollywood Music in Media Awards, and Best Original Song at the 25th Satellite Awards. It also received nominations for Best Original Song at the 93rd Academy Awards, and for Best Song at the 26th Critics' Choice Awards. Laura Pausini performed the song on the 2021 Academy Awards.

Wells has designed best-selling music software, creating the "El Rey" compressor plugin with Acustica Audio and Studio DMI, and a signature series of plugins with Waves Audio.

Wells, Ryan Tedder and Nina Woodford co-wrote (with Wells producing and mixing) the 2019 Special Olympics theme song "Right Where I'm Supposed to Be", executive produced by Quincy Jones. The song was performed by Ryan Tedder, Avril Lavigne, Luis Fonsi, Hussain Al Jassmi, Assala Nasri and Tamer Hosny live at the opening ceremonies in Abu Dhabi.

Wells produced the Grammy- and Golden Globe-nominated song "Beautiful Ghosts", performed by Taylor Swift, for the 2019 film Cats, an adaptation of the 1981 musical of the same name. The song is co-produced with Cats creator Andrew Lloyd Webber, and written by Taylor Swift and Lloyd Webber.

Wells received a Grammy nomination for co-producing and mixing all songs for Lin-Manuel Miranda's 2021 movie and soundtrack album In the Heights, directed by Jon M. Chu. Wells worked on a second film with Alex Lacamoire and Miranda, the animated hit movie musical Vivo directed by Kirk DeMicco, including working with Missy Elliott, Gloria Estefan, and Buena Vista Social Club bandleader Juan de Marcos González. Wells worked on a third film for Lin-Manuel Miranda's directorial debut, mixing the songs in the musical film Tick, Tick... Boom!.

Wells was hired by Wicked composer Stephen Schwartz to be the music producer, multi-instrumentalist, and mix engineer for both the 2024 Wicked and 2025 Wicked: For Good films and soundtrack albums.

== Personal life ==
Wells is married to Swedish songwriter Nina Woodford. He has six children. He worked out of his studio in Los Angeles until it was destroyed along with his home in January 2025 during the Palisades Fire.

In 2022, Wells acquired St. Luke's Anglican church in Winterton, Newfoundland and turned it into Trinity Hall, a non-profit music and arts space that raises money for the local community, the Janeway Children's Hospital, and educational programs for Newfoundland musicians.

The Governor General of Canada, the Right Honourable Mary Simon, announced in June 2025 Wells' appointment to the Order of Canada.

== Credits ==
- Wicked - music producer for both films and soundtrack albums, mix engineer and rhythm section multi-instrumentalist playing drums, keyboards, bass and guitars. The single Defying Gravity won Best Pop Duo/Group Performance at the 2026 Grammy Awards.
- John Legend – Best R&B Album at the 63rd Grammy Awards Wells co-produced, mixed, performed piano, and co-wrote the song "Never Break" from the album Bigger Love.
- Adele – 21, the best-selling album of the 21st century, co-wrote the song "One and Only"
- The Greatest Showman: Original Motion Picture Soundtrack – Wells won a 2019 Grammy Award for producing and mixing this number 1 album on iTunes in 77 countries, number 1 in the UK album sales chart for 28 weeks, number 1 in the US album sales chart for three weeks, with the single "This Is Me" winning a 2018 Golden Globe and nominated/performed on the 2018 Academy Awards. The album is the best-selling worldwide album of 2018.
- Twenty One Pilots – 2× Platinum album Vessel produced and mixed.
- In the Heights – received 5th Grammy nomination for co-producing and mixing the songs with Lin-Manuel Miranda, Alex Lacamoire, and Bill Sherman.
- Taylor Swift – produced the Golden Globe and Grammy nominated song "Beautiful Ghosts".
- Timbaland and OneRepublic – produced worldwide number 1 hit "Apologize", both the Timbaland remix and the original version.
- Mika – produced, mixed, and played electric guitar, drums, piano and bass guitar on Mika's chart-topping debut single "Grace Kelly" from the album Life in Cartoon Motion which stayed at number 1 for seven weeks in the UK.
- Celine Dion – cowrote #1 European single "The Reason" from the 31 million selling album Let's Talk About Love

== Awards ==
Wells has 8 Grammy nominations and 2 wins, in 2019 for his production and mixing on The Greatest Showman film and soundtrack album, and in 2023 winning a 2nd Grammy for producing the majority of Michael Buble's album Higher.

He received the Pensado Giant Award at the 2017 Pensado Awards for achievements in the field of record-making.

In June 2015, Wells was awarded an honorary degree from his alma mater Humber College, a music school in Toronto.

Wells was nominated as Producer Of The Year three times in 2000, 2019, and 2026 at the Canadian Juno Awards.

In his hometown of Peterborough, Ontario, Wells was inducted into the Peterborough Pathway of Fame in 2023.

Year	Nominee / work	Award	Result
2008	"Love Today"	Grammy Award for Best Dance Recording	Nominated
2011	Teenage Dream	Grammy Award for Album of the Year	Nominated
2019	The Greatest Showman: Original Motion Picture Soundtrack	Grammy Award for Best Compilation Soundtrack for Visual Media	Won
2022	In The Heights: Original Motion Picture Soundtrack	Grammy Award for Best Compilation Soundtrack for Visual Media	Nominated
2022	Andrew Lloyd Webber's Cinderella	Grammy Award for Best Musical Theater Album	Nominated
2023	Higher	Grammy Award for Best Traditional Pop Vocal Album	Won
2026	Wicked: The Soundtrack	Grammy Award for Best Compilation Soundtrack for Visual Media	Nominated
2027	Wicked: For Good	Grammy Award for Best Compilation Soundtrack for Visual Media	Nominated
