= Primal Scream discography =

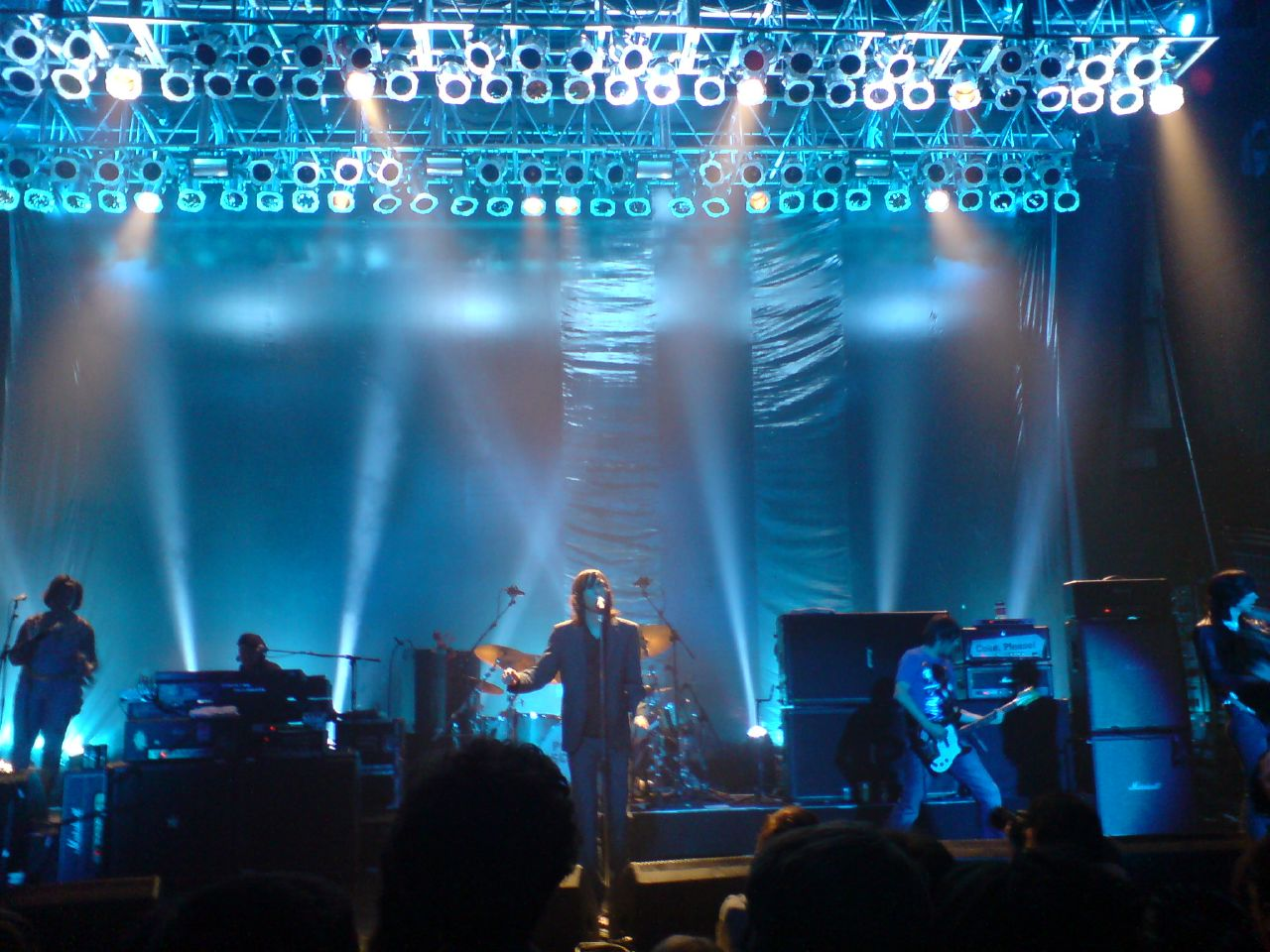
- Primal Scream performing in Southampton in 2006
- Studio albums: 12
- Extended plays: 1
- Live albums: 1
- Compilation albums: 4
- Singles: 26
- Video albums: 2

The discography of Primal Scream, a Scottish rock band, consists of twelve studio albums, twenty-six singles, one EP, two greatest hits albums, two live albums, and one remix album. They also released a joint live CD and DVD with MC5 titled Black to Comm, recorded at the 2008 Meltdown festival.

== Albums ==
=== Studio albums ===
Title	Album details	Peak chart positions										Certifications
Title	Album details	UK	AUS	AUT	FIN	FRA	GER	IRE	JPN	NOR	SWE	Certifications
Sonic Flower Groove	Released: 5 October 1987; Label: Elevation	62	—	—	—	—	—	—	—	—	—	
Primal Scream	Released: 4 September 1989; Label: Creation	—	—	—	—	—	—	—	—	—	—	
Screamadelica	Released: 23 September 1991; Label: Creation	8	—	—	—	—	—	57	57	—	—	UK: 2× Platinum
Give Out but Don't Give Up	Released: 28 March 1994; Label: Creation	2	28	31	32	—	40	—	28	15	7	UK: Gold
Vanishing Point	Released: 7 July 1997; Label: Creation	2	64	31	31	—	97	—	14	—	3	UK: Gold; JPN: Gold
XTRMNTR	Released: 31 January 2000; Label: Creation	3	17	—	27	—	95	14	14	15	7	UK: Gold; JPN: Gold
Evil Heat	Released: 5 August 2002; Label: Columbia	9	50	—	39	101	88	13	13	27	17	UK: Silver
Riot City Blues	Released: 5 June 2006; Label: Columbia	5	54	—	—	74	—	14	10	15	18	UK: Gold; IRE: Gold
Beautiful Future	Released: 21 July 2008; Label: B-Unique	9	—	62	—	153	—	36	17	—	57	
More Light	Released: 13 May 2013; Label: Ignition	12	—	73	—	29	99	16	12	25	27	
Chaosmosis	Released: 18 March 2016; Label: First International	12	100	—	—	184	—	70	18	—	—	
Come Ahead	Released: 8 November 2024; Label: BMG	24	—	—	—	—	—	—	—	—	—	
"—" denotes items that did not chart or were not released in that territory.

=== Compilation albums ===
Title	Album details	Peak chart positions				Certifications
Title	Album details	UK	IRE	JPN	SCO	Certifications
Dirty Hits	Released: 3 November 2003; Label: Sony	25	32	16	11	UK: Gold
Shoot Speed – More Dirty Hits	Released: 17 March 2004; Label: Sony	—	—	48	—	
Maximum Rock'n'Roll: The Singles	Released: 24 May 2019; Label: Sony	18	—	—	3	
The Screamadelica 12" Singles	Released: 1 October 2021; Label: Sony	—	—	—	—	
Demodelica	Released: 15 October 2021; Label: Columbia	—	—	—	—	
Reverberations (Travelling In Time): BBC Radio Sessions & Creation Singles 1985-86	Released: 28 July 2023; Label: Young Tiki	—	—	—	—	
"—" denotes items that did not chart or were not released in that territory.

=== Remix albums ===
Title	Album details	Peak chart positions			
Title	Album details	UK	JPN	SCO	SWE
Echo Dek	Released: 27 October 1997; Label: Creation	43	97	57	46

=== Live albums ===
Title	Album details	Peak chart positions
Title	Album details	JPN
Live in Japan	Released: July 2003; Label: Sony	22
Screamadelica Live	Released: 31 May 2011; Label: Eagle Vision	73

== Extended plays ==
Title	Extended play details	Peak chart positions		
Title	Extended play details	UK	AUS	IRE
Dixie-Narco	Released: 27 January 1992; Label: Creation	11	91	10
Diamonds, Fur Coat, Champagne	Released: 30 March 2009; Label: Blast First Petite	—	—	—

== Singles ==
Year	Title	Peak chart positions										Certifications	Album
Year	Title	UK	AUS	CAN	FIN	GER	IRE	NED	NZ	SCO	SWE	Certifications	Album
1985	"All Fall Down" / "It Happens"	—	—	—	—	—	—	—	—	—	—		Non-album singles
1986	"Crystal Crescent" / "Velocity Girl"	188	—	—	—	—	—	—	—	—	—		Non-album singles
1986	"Crystal Crescent" / "Velocity Girl"	188	—	—	—	—	—	—	—	59	—		Non-album singles
1987	"Gentle Tuesday"	86	—	—	—	—	—	—	—	—	—		Sonic Flower Groove
1987	"Imperial"	86	—	—	—	—	—	—	—	—	—		Sonic Flower Groove
1989	"Ivy Ivy Ivy"	97	—	—	—	—	—	—	—	—	—		Primal Scream
1990	"Loaded"	16	—	—	—	—	—	31	—	—	—	UK: Gold	Screamadelica
1990	"Come Together"	26	—	—	—	—	—	—	—	—	—		Screamadelica
1991	"Higher than the Sun"	40	—	—	—	—	—	—	—	—	—		Screamadelica
1991	"Don't Fight It, Feel It"	41	—	—	—	—	—	—	—	—	—		Screamadelica
1992	"Movin' On Up"	11	—	—	—	93	—	—	—	—	—	UK: Gold	Screamadelica
1992	"Damaged"	—	—	—	—	—	—	—	—	—	—		Screamadelica
1994	"Rocks"/"Funky Jam"	7	43	47	—	—	12	18	8	4	—	UK: Gold	Give Out but Don't Give Up
1994	"Jailbird"	29	68	—	—	—	—	—	27	60	—		Give Out but Don't Give Up
1994	"(I'm Gonna) Cry Myself Blind"	49	48	—	—	—	—	—	29	40	—		Give Out but Don't Give Up
1996	"The Big Man and the Scream Team Meet the Barmy Army Uptown" (with Irvine Welsh and On-U Sound)	17	—	—	—	—	—	—	—	6	—		Non-album single
1997	"Kowalski"	8	79	—	16	—	—	—	—	2	20		Vanishing Point
1997	"Star"	16	—	—	—	—	—	—	—	9	25		Vanishing Point
1997	"Burning Wheel"	17	—	—	—	—	—	—	—	10	60		Vanishing Point
1998	"If They Move, Kill 'Em"	81	—	—	—	—	—	—	—	91	—		Vanishing Point
1999	"Swastika Eyes"	22	71	—	—	—	—	—	—	17	—		XTRMNTR
2000	"Kill All Hippies"	24	—	—	—	—	—	—	—	19	—		XTRMNTR
2000	"Accelerator"	34	—	—	—	—	—	—	—	30	—		XTRMNTR
2002	"Miss Lucifer"	25	—	—	—	—	45	—	—	21	48		Evil Heat
2002	"Autobahn 66"	44	—	—	—	—	—	—	—	41	—		Evil Heat
2003	"Some Velvet Morning" (with Kate Moss)	44	—	—	—	—	—	97	—	42	—		Evil Heat
2006	"Country Girl"	5	—	—	17	—	18	—	—	3	47	UK: Silver	Riot City Blues
2006	"Dolls (Sweet Rock and Roll)"	40	—	—	—	—	—	—	—	16	—		Riot City Blues
2006	"Sometimes I Feel So Lonely"	—	—	—	—	—	—	—	—	—	—		Riot City Blues
2008	"Can't Go Back"	48	—	—	—	—	—	—	—	11	—		Beautiful Future
2008	"Uptown"	—	—	—	—	—	—	—	—	—	—		Beautiful Future
2013	"2013"	—	—	—	—	—	—	—	—	—	—		More Light
2013	"It's Alright, It's OK"	—	—	—	—	—	—	—	—	—	—		More Light
2013	"Invisible City"	—	—	—	—	—	—	—	—	—	—		More Light
2016	"Where the Light Gets In" (with Sky Ferreira)	—	—	—	—	—	—	—	—	—	—		Chaosmosis
2016	"100% or Nothing"	—	—	—	—	—	—	—	—	—	—		Chaosmosis
2016	"(Feeling Like a) Demon Again"	—	—	—	—	—	—	—	—	—	—		Chaosmosis
2024	"Love Insurrection"	—	—	—	—	—	—	—	—	—	—		Come Ahead
"—" denotes items that did not chart or were not released in that territory.

== Videos ==
Year	Title	Format
1992	Screamadelica: Released: 13 April 1992; Label: Vision Video Ltd.	VHS
2007	Riot City Blues Tour: Released: 6 August 2007; Label: Liberation	DVD
2011	Screamadelica Live: Released: 30 May 2011; Label: Eagle Vision	DVD, Blu-ray
