= Riot City Blues Tour =

- Release dates: 6 August 2007 (UK); 9 October 2007 (U.S.)
- Running time: 143 minutes
- Country: England
- Language: English

Riot City Blues Tour is the first live DVD from Scottish band Primal Scream. The show was filmed in high-definition at the Hammersmith Apollo in London during the tour in support of their eighth album, Riot City Blues. The sold-out concert occurred soon after the band received the Godlike Geniuses award from British music publication NME.

The DVD serves as a career retrospective, showcasing the band's history of over twenty years since it was formed in 1984. In addition to a set of 17 songs, including "Loaded" and "Kick Out the Jams" (which is exclusive to this DVD), all of the band's 13 music videos are included, as is a recent interview with band vocalist and founder Bobby Gillespie and frequent collaborator and bassist, Mani.

== Track list ==
1. "Accelerator" (from XTRMNTR)
2. "Dolls" (from Riot City Blues)
3. "Jailbird" (from Give Out But Don't Give Up)
4. "Shoot Speed/Kill Light" (from XTRMNTR)
5. "Suicide Sally & Johnny Guitar" (from Riot City Blues)
6. "Burning Wheel" (from Vanishing Point)
7. "When the Bomb Drops" (from Riot City Blues)
8. "The 99th Floor" (from Riot City Blues)
9. "Medication" (from Vanishing Point)
10. "Rise" (from Evil Heat)
11. "Swastika Eyes" (from XTRMNTR)
12. "Country Girl" (from Riot City Blues)
13. "Rocks" (from Give Out But Don't Give Up)
14. "Damaged" (from Screamadelica)
15. "Loaded" (from Screamadelica)
16. "Movin' On Up" (from Screamadelica)
17. "Kick Out the Jams"

== Extras ==
13 Promo Videos

1. "Loaded" (from Screamadelica)
2. "Come Together" (from Screamadelica)
3. "Movin' On Up" (from Screamadelica)
4. "Rocks" (from Give Out But Don't Give Up)
5. "Jailbird" (from Give Out But Don't Give Up)
6. "Swastika Eyes" (from XTRMNTR)
7. "Kill All Hippies" (from XTRMNTR)
8. "Accelerator" (from XTRMNTR)
9. "Miss Lucifer" (from Evil Heat)
10. "Autobahn 66" (from Evil Heat)
11. "Some Velvet Morning" (from Evil Heat)
12. "Country Girl" (from Riot City Blues)
13. "Dolls" (from Riot City Blues)
