= Dirty Hits =

Greatest hits album by Primal Scream
- Released: 3 November 2003
- Recorded: 1990–2003
- Label: Columbia

Primal Scream chronology
Evil Heat (2002)	Dirty Hits (2003)	Shoot Speed – More Dirty Hits (2004)

Professional ratings
Review scores
Source	Rating
AllMusic	4/5 stars
Stylus Magazine	C+

Dirty Hits is a greatest hits album by Scottish rock band Primal Scream. It was released on 3 November 2003 by Columbia Records. The album is generally made up of chronologically listed singles, except the album tracks "Long Life", "Shoot Speed/Kill Light", and "Deep Hit of Morning Sun". The rare C86 single "Velocity Girl" is not included, neither is anything from Sonic Flower Groove or their self-titled 1989 album. Tracks from this period appeared on the compilation's sequel; Shoot Speed – More Dirty Hits, released five months later.

Early limited versions came in a card sleeve with a bonus disc of remixes; most had previously appeared as B-sides.

== Track listing ==
All tracks are written by Primal Scream; except "Some Velvet Morning" written by Lee Hazlewood.

No.	Title	Length
1.	"Loaded" (Edit)	4:34
2.	"Movin' on Up"	3:44
3.	"Come Together" (Edit)	4:53
4.	"Higher Than the Sun"	3:37
5.	"Rocks"	3:35
6.	"Jailbird"	3:35
7.	"(I'm Gonna) Cry Myself Blind"	4:26
8.	"Burning Wheel" (Edit)	4:34
9.	"Kowalski" (Edit)	4:31
10.	"Long Life"	3:49
11.	"Swastika Eyes"	3:52
12.	"Kill All Hippies"	4:07
13.	"Accelerator"	3:38
14.	"Shoot Speed/Kill Light"	5:15
15.	"Miss Lucifer"	2:28
16.	"Deep Hit of Morning Sun"	3:45
17.	"Some Velvet Morning" (featuring Kate Moss) (new version)	3:50
18.	"Autobahn 66"	6:16

Bonus disc
No.	Title	Length
1.	"Come Together (Hypnotone Brain Machine Mix)"	5:17
2.	"Higher Than The Sun (The Orb Extended Extended Mix)"	5:00
3.	"Loaded (Terry Farley Remix)"	5:59
4.	"Rocks (Jimmy Miller Mix)"	3:42
5.	"Jailbird (Sweeney 2 Sabres of Paradise Remix)"	5:46
6.	"Kowalski (Automator Mix)"	5:12
7.	"Living Dub (Long Life Adrian Sherwood Remix)"	5:31
8.	"Stuka (Two Lone Swordsmen Mix)"	10:14
9.	"Swastika Eyes (Chemical Brothers Mix UK Edit)"	3:55
10.	"Exterminator (Massive Attack Remix)"	5:08
11.	"Miss Lucifer (Bone to Bone Alec Empire Remix)"	3:23
12.	"Some Velvet Morning (Two Lone Swordsmen Alternative Mix)"	6:54
13.	"Autobahn 66 (Alter Ego Remix)"	6:41
