= Screamadelica Live =

Live album / DVD by Primal Scream
- Released: 30 May 2011
- Recorded: 26 November 2010
- Genre: Alternative rock; electronic; indie pop; trip hop
- Label: Eagle Rock Entertainment

Primal Scream chronology
Beautiful Future (2008)	Screamadelica Live (2011)	More Light (2013)

Screamadelica Live is a live album by Scottish rock group Primal Scream, which was released in 2011 for Primal Scream's tour for the 20th anniversary for the 1991 album Screamadelica. The performance was filmed at the Olympia Grand Hall in London on 26 November 2010 and was released on CD, DVD and Blu-ray on 30 May 2011. This is the final Primal Scream album to feature Mani, who departed and reformed his previous band The Stone Roses in the same year.

== Track listing ==
=== Setlist ===
1. "Accelerator"
2. "Country Girl"
3. "Jailbird"
4. "Burning Wheel"
5. "Suicide Bomb"
6. "Shoot Speed / Kill Light"
7. "Swastika Eyes"
8. "Rocks"

Screamdelica

1. "Movin' on Up"
2. "Slip Inside This House"
3. "Don't Fight It, Feel It"
4. "Damaged"
5. "I'm Comin' Down"
6. "Shine Like Stars"
7. "Inner Flight"
8. "Higher Than the Sun"
9. "Loaded"
10. "Come Together"

== Primal Scream ==
- Bobby Gillespie – vocals
- Andrew Innes – guitars, synthesizers
- Barrie Cadogan – guitars
- Gary Mounfield – bass
- Martin Duffy – keyboards, synthesizers, samples, programming, turntables, effects
- Darrin Mooney – drums, percussion

== Charts ==
=== Weekly charts ===
Chart (2011)	Peak position
UK Music Videos (OCC)	9
