= Dixie-Narco (EP) =

1992 EP by Primal Scream

Dixie-Narco EP

EP by Primal Scream
- Released: 27 January 1992
- Recorded: November 1991
- Studio: Ardent (Memphis, Tennessee)
- Length: 22:50
- Label: Creation
- Producer: Jimmy Miller; Andrew Weatherall; Hugo Nicolson

Primal Scream chronology
Dixie-Narco EP (1992)	Diamonds, Fur Coat, Champagne (2009)

Professional ratings
Review scores
Source	Rating
AllMusic	4/5 stars

Dixie-Narco is an extended play (EP) by Scottish rock band Primal Scream, released on 27 January 1992 through Creation Records. Its lead track is "Movin' On Up", originally released on the Screamadelica album. This was the only official Primal Scream release to contain the song "Screamadelica" (which was recorded during sessions for the Screamadelica album) until the song appeared on the 20th anniversary edition of the Screamadelica album.

The remaining two tracks were recorded at Ardent Studios in Memphis during November 1991. 'Carry Me Home' was originally written by Dennis Wilson for The Beach Boys' 1973 album Holland, although it was not included on that album.

== Track listing ==
Side A
No.	Title	Writer(s)	Length
1.	"Movin' On Up"	Bobby Gillespie, Andrew Innes, Robert Young	3:49
2.	"Stone My Soul"	Gillespie, Innes, Young	3:03
3.	"Carry Me Home"	Dennis Wilson, Gregg Jakobson	5:12

Side B
No.	Title	Writer(s)	Length
4.	"Screamadelica"	Gillespie, Innes, Young	10:46

The 7-inch and cassette formats omit "Stone My Soul".
"Movin' On Up" previously appeared on Screamadelica.

== Personnel ==
- "Movin' On Up" produced by Jimmy Miller
- "Stone My Soul", "Carry Me Home", and "Screamadelica" produced by Andrew Weatherall and Hugo Nicolson.
- "Screamadelica" features vocals from Denise Johnson and percussion by Paul Daley.

== Charts ==
=== Dixie-Narco EP ===
Chart (1992)	Peak position
Australia (ARIA)	91
Europe (Eurochart Hot 100)	40
Ireland (IRMA)	10
UK Singles (OCC)	11

=== "Movin' On Up" ===
Chart (1992)	Peak position
Germany (GfK)	93
UK Airplay (Music Week)	12
US Alternative Airplay (Billboard)	2
US Mainstream Rock (Billboard)	28

== Release history ==
Region	Date	Format(s)	Label(s)	Ref.
United Kingdom	27 January 1992	7-inch vinyl; 12-inch vinyl; CD; cassette	Creation	
Japan	21 March 1992	CD	Creation	
Australia	20 April 1992	CD; cassette	Columbia; Shock	
Japan (re-release)	23 June 1994	CD	Creation	
