= Chaosmosis =

Studio album by Primal Scream
- Released: 18 March 2016
- Studio: Das Bunker (London); Lynchmob (London); Narcissus (London); Ingrid (Stockholm); Perfect Sound (Los Angeles); Diamond Mine (New York City)
- Length: 37:43
- Label: First International; Ignition
- Producer: Bobby Gillespie; Andrew Innes; Björn Yttling

Primal Scream chronology
More Light (2013)	Chaosmosis (2016)	Come Ahead (2024)

Singles from Chaosmosis
- 1. "Where the Light Gets In" Released: 1 February 2016; 2. "I Can Change" Released: 14 March 2016; 3. "Trippin' on Your Love" Released: 16 March 2016; 4. "100% or Nothing" Released: 19 August 2016

Chaosmosis is the eleventh studio album by Scottish band Primal Scream. It was released on 18 March 2016 on the band's First International label, through Ignition Records. The album's lead single, "Where the Light Gets In", was released on 1 February 2016 and features American singer Sky Ferreira. "I Can Change" was released on 14 March 2016 as the second single from the album. "Trippin' on Your Love" was released to US submodern rock radio on 16 March 2016 as the album's third single. The fourth single, "100% or Nothing", was released as a 12-inch single on 19 August 2016.

The album is the last to feature band member Martin Duffy prior to his death in December 2022.

== Critical reception ==
Professional ratings
Aggregate scores
Source	Rating
Metacritic	65/100
Review scores
Source	Rating
AllMusic	2.5/5 stars
The A.V. Club	B
Clash	7/10
DIY	4/5 stars
Exclaim!	6/10
The Guardian	3/5 stars
NME	4/5
Pitchfork	6.0/10
PopMatters	6/10
Spin	6/10

Chaosmosis received positive reviews from music critics. At Metacritic, which assigns a normalised rating out of 100 to reviews from mainstream publications, the album received an average score of 65, based on 25 reviews. Writing for Exclaim!, Cam Lindsay called the record "an uneven effort by a band that specializes in doing whatever the hell feels right."

== Track listing ==
All tracks are written by Bobby Gillespie and Andrew Innes, except where noted.

No.	Title	Writer(s)	Producer(s)	Length
1.	"Trippin' on Your Love"		Björn Yttling; Innes; Gillespie	3:30
2.	"(Feeling Like A) Demon Again"	Gillespie, Innes, Yttling	Innes; Gillespie; Yttling^{[a]}	4:35
3.	"I Can Change"		Innes; Gillespie	3:17
4.	"100% or Nothing"		Innes; Gillespie	3:54
5.	"Private Wars"		Innes; Gillespie; Yttling^{[a]}	2:30
6.	"Where the Light Gets In"		Yttling; Innes; Gillespie	3:47
7.	"When the Blackout Meets the Fallout"		Innes; Gillespie	1:48
8.	"Carnival of Fools"	Gillespie, Innes, Yttling	Innes; Gillespie; Yttling^{[a]}	3:41
9.	"Golden Rope"		Innes; Gillespie	5:37
10.	"Autumn in Paradise"	Gillespie, Innes, Yttling	Innes; Gillespie; Yttling^{[a]}	5:04

Japanese edition bonus track
No.	Title	Length
11.	"Where the Light Gets In" (U-Bahn Zum Hansaplatz Remix)

=== Notes ===
- ^{^[a]} signifies an additional producer

== Personnel ==
Credits adapted from the liner notes of Chaosmosis.

=== Primal Scream ===
- Bobby Gillespie – vocals (all tracks); synthesiser (track 2)
- Andrew Innes – guitar (tracks 1, 2, 4–10); loops (tracks 1, 3, 4, 7–9); plug-ins (tracks 1, 3, 4, 6–9); synthesiser (tracks 2, 6, 7, 9, 10); dulcimer (track 5)
- Martin Duffy – piano (tracks 1, 6); organ (track 1); vibraphone (track 4)
- Darrin Mooney – percussion (tracks 1, 9); drums (track 3)

=== Additional musicians ===
- Danielle Haim – backing vocals (tracks 1, 4)
- Este Haim – backing vocals (tracks 1, 4)
- Alana Haim – backing vocals (tracks 1, 4)
- Jason Falkner – bass (tracks 1, 3, 4, 9)
- Björn Yttling – synthesiser (track 2); celeste (track 5); piano (track 8)
- Christoffer Zachrisson – zither (track 2)
- Jim Hunt – flute (track 3); saxophone (tracks 7, 9)
- Rachel Zeffira – vocals, viola, violin (track 5); backing vocals (tracks 8–10); cor anglais (track 9)
- Deborah Chandler – cello (track 5)
- John Eriksson – drums (tracks 5, 10)
- Sky Ferreira – vocals (track 6)
- Sophie Nevrkla – backing vocals (track 9)
- Grace Cockell – backing vocals (track 9)

=== Technical ===
- Björn Yttling – production (tracks 1, 6); additional production (tracks 2, 5, 8, 10)
- Andrew Innes – production (all tracks); engineering (tracks 1, 3–10)
- Bobby Gillespie – production
- Lasse Mårtén – mixing
- Brendan Lynch – engineering (track 1)
- Ross Matthews – engineering (tracks 1, 4)
- Gustav Lindelow – engineering (track 2)
- Hans Stenlund – engineering (tracks 2, 5, 6, 8, 10)
- Max Heyes – engineering (track 6)
- Sean Kellet – engineering (track 6)
- Joe Harrison – engineering assistance (track 6)

=== Artwork ===
- Jim Lambie – artwork
- Mick Hutson – original photography
- Matthew Cooper – design
- Bobby Gillespie – design

== Charts ==
Chart performance for Chaosmosis
Chart (2016)	Peak position
Australian Albums (ARIA)	100
Belgian Albums (Ultratop Flanders)	121
Belgian Albums (Ultratop Wallonia)	73
French Albums (SNEP)	184
Irish Albums (IRMA)	70
Italian Albums (FIMI)	78
Scottish Albums (OCC)	3
Swiss Albums (Schweizer Hitparade)	84
UK Albums (OCC)	12
UK Independent Albums (OCC)	3
US Heatseekers Albums (Billboard)	14
US Independent Albums (Billboard)	49
