= Velocity Girl (song) =

Single by Primal Scream
- A-side: "Crystal Crescent"
- Released: April 1986
- Recorded: 1986
- Genre: Jangle pop; indie pop; noise pop
- Length: 1:22
- Label: Creation Records
- Songwriter: Bobby Gillespie
- Producer: Primal Scream

Primal Scream singles chronology
"All Fall Down" / "It Happens" (1985)	"Crystal Crescent" / "Velocity Girl" (1986)	"Gentle Tuesday" (1987)

"Velocity Girl" is a song by British alternative rock band Primal Scream, originally released as the B-side to their second single, "Crystal Crescent", in 1986. The song has been noted for its influence in indie pop, with Pitchfork Media saying that it reduced "the pop song to its subatomic essence: quick, breezy, quirky, and above all, exquisitely small". The song was partly inspired by the actress, model and Warhol superstar Edie Sedgwick.

== History ==
Primal Scream frontman Bobby Gillespie had left his post as the drummer of The Jesus and Mary Chain in early 1986, recording only one album with them, the influential noise pop release Psychocandy in 1985. Disentangled from their major label "whirlwind", he resumed activity with his lesser known band Primal Scream, recording "Velocity Girl" shortly afterwards. The band also recorded a slightly longer version with a second verse for Janice Long in July 1986.

The NME magazine decided to include the song as the first track on their C86 cassette later on in 1986, a collection of tracks from indie bands from British independent record labels. The cassette turned out to be very popular and influential, being later released as a separate, coupon-attained vinyl album and inspiring the nickname "C86" for mid-1980s indie pop music with an emphasis on jangle guitars.

== Influence ==
Pitchfork Media wrote of the song's influence, saying that "in pop music, 82 seconds can be an eternity. That’s how long Primal Scream’s “Velocity Girl” lasts, and the song was enough to have crystallized an entire era and established an undying narrative," noting that as C86's opening track, it "has become iconic", and "sounded humble, but it was not without ambition. It falls shy of the minute-and-half mark, and shyness can be heard in the song’s desperate refrain: “Leave me alone,” Gillespie pleads in a Glaswegian warble as guitars ring like chimes around him. It was the sound of soaring punk rock as filtered through the Byrds, and its expression of angry introversion— told in an almost Morrissey-esque manner, via the tale of a troubled, sensitive young woman— was only the first stage of evolution for Primal Scream", concluding that "Velocity Girl" "became C86’s signature song, and it’s the track that, more than any other on the tape, helped turn C86 from a comp into a genre." They stated that the song had a "hefty" influence on indie and alternative rock bands of the 90s, such as My Bloody Valentine, The Strokes and Belle and Sebastian.

NME later ranked the song at number 90 on their list of the "100 Best Tracks of the Eighties", saying "it wasn’t just a key song in the C86 tape movement, it was a key moment in Primal Scream’s career", calling it "a great slice of vintage eighties jangle pop - a style and sound that the band would distance themselves from with Screamadelica, but from the teen-misfit of the title to the energized bolt of the music, this was a perfect moment of 80s indie Britpop." Allmusic said the song was the band's "early sound at its purest: a jangly rush of hyper-strummed guitars over an ultra-simple rhythm section behind Bobby Gillespie's charmingly naïve vocals."

The song gained the number 4 position in the yearly John Peel "festive fifty" vote in 1986. It was the shortest song on the list that year.

The American indie band Velocity Girl took their name from the song. Welsh alternative rock band Manic Street Preachers covered the song in 1996 as the B-side to their single "Australia". It is also available on their B-sides collection Lipstick Traces (A Secret History of Manic Street Preachers).

In April 2019, the song was re-issued as a 7" single for Record Store Day. The release was accompanied with a new music video, directed by Douglas Hart.

== Personnel ==
Primal Scream

- Bobby Gillespie – lead vocals
- Jim Beattie – lead guitar
- Robert Young – bass guitar
- Paul Harte – rhythm guitar
- Thomas McGurk – drums
- Martin St. John – tambourine

== Charts ==
Chart (2019)	Peak position
Scotland Singles (Official Charts)	59
