= Beautiful Future =

Studio album by Primal Scream
- Released: 21 July 2008
- Genre: Alternative rock
- Length: 54:00
- Label: B-Unique
- Producer: Björn Yttling; Paul Epworth

Primal Scream chronology
| Riot City Blues (2006) | Beautiful Future (2008) | More Light (2013) |

Singles from Beautiful Future
- 1. "Can't Go Back" Released: 14 July 2008; 2. "Uptown" Released: 2008 (promo)

Beautiful Future is the ninth studio album by Scottish rock band Primal Scream. It was released on 21 July 2008 by B-Unique Records. It peaked at number 9 on the UK Albums Chart. It was promoted with the single "Can't Go Back", and was produced by Björn Yttling and Paul Epworth.

According to the press release, "the album displays a heady mix of genre crunching taking in Philly soul, dark electro, accelerated rock'n'roll riffs and pure British pop, all given that particular Scream edge." The album features special guest appearances from Lovefoxxx (of Cansei de Ser Sexy), Josh Homme (of Queens of the Stone Age) and folk legend Linda Thompson. With the extended edition of Beautiful Future, as well as the album featuring two extra songs ("Urban Guerrilla", "Time of Assassins"), the album also includes the video for the single, "Can't Go Back".

It is the first album not to feature the guitarist Robert "Throb" Young, who left after the release of their previous album Riot City Blues in 2006 due to his retirement for personal reasons, and it is also the last studio album to feature the bassist Mani, who departed after Screamadelica Live in 2011, and then re-formed his past band The Stone Roses in the same year.

== Critical reception ==
Professional ratings
Aggregate scores
| Source | Rating |
|---|---|
| Metacritic | 64/100 |
Review scores
| Source | Rating |
| AllMusic | 2.5/5 stars |
| OMM | 5/5 stars |
| Pitchfork | 7.0/10 |
| NME | 8/10 |
| Digital Spy | 4/5 stars |
| Gigwise | 4/5 stars |
| The Guardian | 2/5 stars |
| The Independent | 2/5 stars |
| The Times | 2/5 stars |
| Virgin Media | 4/5 stars |

At Metacritic, which assigns a weighted average score out of 100 to reviews from mainstream critics, the album received an average score of 64, based on 13 reviews, indicating "generally favorable reviews".

== Track listing ==
All tracks are written by Primal Scream, except "Over & Over" by Fleetwood Mac and "Urban Guerrilla" by Hawkwind.

| No. | Title | Length |
|---|---|---|
| 1. | "Beautiful Future" | 5:09 |
| 2. | "Can't Go Back" | 3:44 |
| 3. | "Uptown" | 4:50 |
| 4. | "The Glory of Love" | 3:11 |
| 5. | "Suicide Bomb" | 5:51 |
| 6. | "Zombie Man" | 3:37 |
| 7. | "Beautiful Summer" | 4:43 |
| 8. | "I Love to Hurt (You Love to Be Hurt)" (featuring Lovefoxxx) | 4:32 |
| 9. | "Over & Over" (featuring Linda Thompson) | 4:33 |
| 10. | "Necro Hex Blues" (featuring Josh Homme) | 3:34 |
| 11. | "The Glory of Love" (single version) | 3:13 |

Limited edition bonus tracks
| No. | Title | Length |
|---|---|---|
| 12. | "Urban Guerrilla" | 3:25 |
| 13. | "Time of the Assassins" | 3:38 |

== Personnel ==
Credits adapted from liner notes.

Primal Scream

- Bobby Gillespie – vocals
- Andrew Innes – guitar, synthesizer
- Gary Mounfield – bass guitar
- Martin Duffy – keyboards
- Darrin Mooney – drums, percussion

Additional musicians

- Victoria Bergsman – vocals
- Ellekari Larsson – vocals
- Lykke Li Zachrisson – vocals
- Maria Andersson – vocals
- Juliet Roberts – vocals
- Lovefoxxx – vocals
- Linda Thompson – vocals
- Erik Arvinder – violin
- Andreas Forsman – violin
- Christopher Öhman – viola
- Emma Lindhamre – cello
- Barrie Cadogan – guitar, slide guitar
- Bjorn Yttling – keyboards
- Josh Homme – guitar

== Charts ==
| Chart | Peak position |
|---|---|
| Austrian Albums (Ö3 Austria) | 62 |
| Croatian International Albums (HDU) | 20 |
| French Albums (SNEP) | 153 |
| Swedish Albums (Sverigetopplistan) | 57 |
| UK Albums (Official Charts) | 9 |
