= Come Ahead =

Studio album by Primal Scream
- Released: 8 November 2024
- Length: 64:39
- Label: BMG
- Producer: David Holmes

Primal Scream chronology
Chaosmosis (2016)	Come Ahead (2024)

Come Ahead is the twelfth studio album by Scottish band Primal Scream. It was released on 8 November 2024, and it is the band's first album both in eight years, as well as without longtime keyboardist Martin Duffy, following his death in 2022.

== Critical reception ==
Professional ratings
Aggregate scores
Source	Rating
Metacritic	68/100
Review scores
Source	Rating
AllMusic	2.5/5 stars
The Arts Desk	4/5 stars
Clash	8/10
DIY	4/5 stars
The Independent	4/5 stars
The London Standard	5/5 stars
Mojo	4/5 stars
NME	4/5 stars
Pitchfork	6.8/10
Record Collector	4/5 stars
The List	4/5 stars

Come Ahead received mostly positive reviews. At Metacritic, which assigns a normalised rating out of 100 to reviews from mainstream publications, the album received an average score of 68, based on 15 reviews.

== Track listing ==
Come Ahead track listing
No.	Title	Writer(s)	Length
1.	"Ready to Go Home"	Bobby Gillespie; Andrew Innes; David Holmes	4:41
2.	"Love Insurrection"	Gillespie; Innes; Holmes	6:19
3.	"Heal Yourself"	Gillespie; Holmes	5:32
4.	"Innocent Money"	Gillespie; Innes; Holmes	6:30
5.	"Melancholy Man"	Gillespie; Innes; Holmes	5:15
6.	"Love Ain't Enough"	Gillespie; Holmes	4:44
7.	"Circus of Life"	Gillespie; Holmes	5:52
8.	"False Flags"	Gillespie; Holmes; Brian Irvine	8:11
9.	"Deep Dark Waters"	Gillespie; Innes; Holmes	4:49
10.	"The Centre Cannot Hold"	Gillespie; Holmes	3:42
11.	"Settler's Blues"	Gillespie; Holmes	9:04
Total length:			64:39

== Personnel ==
Primal Scream (Note: Band member Darrin Mooney is not credited for performing or writing on the album.)

- Bobby Gillespie – vocals
- Andrew Innes – guitar, mandolin, synthesizer (tracks 1, 6, 9, 10)
- Simone Butler – spoken word (track 7)

Additional musicians

- David Wrench – additional programming
- Jason Falkner – bass guitar
- Jay Bellerose – drums
- David Holmes – keyboards, loops
- House Gospel Choir (Note: The House Gospel Choir consists of altos Liza Jennings, Martha Evans, and Shayanne Campbell; sopranos Renee Alleyne, Roslyn Adonteng, and Zehra Lewis-Wright; and tenors Lewis Daniels and Ste Sinclair.) – backing vocals (tracks 1–9, 11)
- Davey Chegwidden – percussion (tracks 1–7, 9–11)
- Alex White – horn (tracks 1, 6), saxophone (5, 11), piano (5)
- Darrin Morris – keyboards (tracks 1, 8, 9, 11)
- Emre Ramanzanoglu – drums (tracks 4, 6)
- Brian Irvine – conductor (tracks 1–4, 6, 8, 11), keyboards (8)
- Aoife Burke – cello (tracks 1–4, 6, 8, 11)
- Maeve Sheil – double bass (tracks 1–4, 6, 8, 11)
- Bogdan Sofei – violin (tracks 1–4, 6, 8, 11)
- Larissa O'Grady – violin (tracks 1–4, 6, 8, 11)
- Dan Bodwel – double bass (tracks 1–3, 6, 8, 11)
- Adele Govier – viola (tracks 1–3, 6, 8, 11)
- Cillian O'Breachin – violin (tracks 1–3, 6, 8, 11)
- David O'Doherty – violin (tracks 1–3, 6, 8, 11)
- Emma Masterson – violin (tracks 1, 4, 8)
- Paula Hughes – cello (tracks 1, 8)
- Nathan Sherman – viola (tracks 1, 8)
- Ingrid Nichola – violin (tracks 1, 8)
- David Kenny – viola (tracks 2–4, 6, 11)
- David McElroy – violin (tracks 2–4, 11)
- Adrian Mantu – cello (tracks 2, 3, 6, 11)
- Christine Kenny – violin (tracks 2, 3, 6, 11)
- Anna Caragnano – spoken word (track 2), backing vocals (6, 7)
- Renee Alleyne – rap vocals (track 4), spoken word (11)
- Yseult Cooper Stockdale – cello (track 4)
- Paul Stephens – double bass (track 4)
- Andreea Banciu – viola (track 4)
- Daniel Gethin – alto vocals (track 5)
- Josh Quinlan – baritone vocals (track 5)
- Sophie Ellis – soprano vocals (track 5)
- Matthew Minter – tenor vocals (track 5)
- Felix Stephens – cello, conductor (track 5)
- Nina Lin – violin (track 5)
- Benjamin Darvill – harmonica (track 10)
- Cian Nugent – guitar (track 11)
- Daniel Thomas – piano (track 11)

Technical

- David Holmes – production
- David Wrench – mixing
- Matt Colton – mastering
- Michael Harris – engineering
- Debbie Smith – engineering (tracks 1, 8)
- Alan Kelly – engineering (tracks 2–4, 6, 11)
- Felix Stephens – engineering, arrangement, string arrangement (track 5)
- Brian Irvine – arrangement, strings arrangement (tracks 1–4, 6, 8)
- Josh Quinlan – arrangement (track 5)
- Ralph Allwood – arrangement (track 5)
- Daniel Thomas – arrangement (track 11)
- Amy Ratcliffe – studio assistance
- Grace Banks – studio assistance
- Tim Pennells – studio assistance
