= Evil Heat =

Studio album by Primal Scream
- Released: 5 August 2002
- Genres: Electronic rock; synthpunk; alternative rock; alternative dance; electroclash
- Length: 41:52
- Labels: Columbia (UK and Europe); Epic (US)
- Producers: Two Lone Swordsmen; Kevin Shields; Jagz Kooner

Primal Scream chronology
XTRMNTR (2000)	Evil Heat (2002)	Dirty Hits (2003)

Singles from Evil Heat
- 1. "Miss Lucifer" Released: June 2002; 2. "Autobahn 66" Released: November 2002; 3. "Some Velvet Morning" Released: November 2002

Evil Heat is the seventh studio album by Scottish rock band Primal Scream. It was first released on 5 August 2002 in the United Kingdom by Columbia Records and on 26 November 2002 in the United States by Epic Records. It peaked at number 9 on the UK Albums Chart. Musically, its style forms a link between two of the band's previous albums: the aggressive protest of XTRMNTR (2000), and the acid house psychedelia of Screamadelica (1991).

== Composition ==
The track "Rise" was originally titled "Bomb the Pentagon", and debuted as part of the band's live set in summer 2001. In light of the 11 September 2001 attacks, both the lyrics and title of the song were reworked, and the revised version appears on the album. "Space Blues #2", written and performed solely by Martin Duffy, is a follow-up to "Space Blues", a song by his previous band Felt.

== Critical reception ==
Professional ratings
Aggregate scores
Source	Rating
Metacritic	68/100
Review scores
Source	Rating
AllMusic	3/5 stars
Blender	3/5 stars
Dotmusic	4/5 stars
The Guardian	3/5 stars
Mojo	4/5 stars
NME	8/10
Pitchfork	6.0/10
Playlouder	5/5 stars
Rolling Stone	3/5 stars
Spin	8/10

At Metacritic, which assigns a weighted average score out of 100 to reviews from mainstream critics, the album received an average score of 68, based on 24 reviews, indicating "generally favorable reviews".

Playlouder ranked the album at number 35 on their list of the top 50 albums of 2002.

== Track listing ==
All tracks are written by Primal Scream, except where noted.

No.	Title	Writer(s)	Length
1.	"Deep Hit of Morning Sun"		3:44
2.	"Miss Lucifer"		2:28
3.	"Autobahn 66"		6:15
4.	"Detroit"		3:03
5.	"Rise"		4:21
6.	"The Lord Is My Shotgun"		3:56
7.	"City"		3:22
8.	"Some Velvet Morning" (featuring Kate Moss)	Lee Hazlewood	3:40
9.	"Skull X"		3:52
10.	"A Scanner Darkly"		4:30
11.	"Space Blues #2"	Martin Duffy	2:28

Japanese edition bonus track
No.	Title	Length
12.	"Substance D"	3:46

== Personnel ==
Credits adapted from liner notes.

Primal Scream

- Bobby Gillespie – vocals, guitar, programming
- Andrew Innes – guitar
- Robert Young – guitar, programming
- Martin Duffy – keyboards, programming, samples
- Gary 'Mani' Mounfield – bass
- Darrin Mooney – drums, programming

Additional musicians

- Jim Reid – lead vocals (4)
- Kate Moss – additional vocals (8)
- Robert Plant – harmonica (6)
- Kevin Shields – guitar effects (7)
- Paul Harte – guitar effects (9)
- Phil Mossman – harmonica (2)
- Darren Morris – synthesizer (5)
- Chris Mackin – bass guitar (3)
- Marco Nelson – harmony voice (3)
- Brendan Lynch – synthesizer (7)

== Charts ==
Chart	Peak position
Australian Albums (ARIA)	50
Finnish Albums (Suomen virallinen lista)	39
French Albums (SNEP)	101
Italian Albums (FIMI)	50
Norwegian Albums (VG-lista)	27
Swedish Albums (Sverigetopplistan)	17
UK Albums (Official Charts)	9

== Certifications ==
Certifications for Evil Heat
Region	Certification	Certified units/sales
United Kingdom (BPI)	Silver	60,000^{‡}
^{‡} Sales+streaming figures based on certification alone.
