= Primal Scream (Primal Scream album) =

Studio album by Primal Scream
- Released: 4 September 1989
- Genres: Alternative rock; hard rock; garage rock; blues rock
- Length: 32:38
- Label: Creation
- Producer: Sister Anne

Primal Scream chronology
Sonic Flower Groove (1987)	Primal Scream (1989)	Screamadelica (1991)

Singles from Primal Scream
- 1. "Ivy Ivy Ivy" Released: July 1989

Primal Scream is the second studio album by Scottish rock band Primal Scream. It was released on 4 September 1989 in the United Kingdom by Creation Records and in the United States by Mercenary Records. Musically, it took a harder rock approach than their 1987 debut Sonic Flower Groove and did not achieve great success. However, the song "I'm Losing More Than I'll Ever Have" was later remixed to provide the breakthrough single "Loaded", which appeared on their much celebrated third album Screamadelica.

== Critical reception ==
Professional ratings
Review scores
Source	Rating
AllMusic	2.5/5 stars
Encyclopedia of Popular Music	3/5 stars
The Great Rock Discography	6/10
MusicHound	1/5
NME	6/10
Q	3/5 stars
Record Mirror	2.5/5
The Rolling Stone Album Guide	2/5 stars

The album received mixed-to-positive reviews from music critics. Tim Sendra of AllMusic wrote: "While the group was capable of whipping up a credible approximation of thuggish hard rock, Bobby Gillespie's fragile wisp of a voice is rather ill-suited to kicking out the jams."

== Track listing ==
All tracks are written by Bobby Gillespie, Andrew Innes and Robert "Throb" Young.

No.	Title	Length
1.	"Ivy Ivy Ivy"	3:07
2.	"You're Just Dead Skin to Me"	4:42
3.	"She Power"	3:10
4.	"You're Just Too Dark to Care"	3:09
5.	"I'm Losing More Than I'll Ever Have"	5:11
6.	"Gimme Gimme Teenage Head"	2:30
7.	"Lone Star Girl"	3:14
8.	"Kill the King"	3:30
9.	"Sweet Pretty Thing"	2:20
10.	"Jesus Can't Save Me"	1:45

== Personnel ==
Credits adapted from liner notes.

Primal Scream

- Robert "Throb" Young – guitar
- Bobby Gillespie – vocals
- Andrew Innes – guitar
- Philip Tomanov – drums

Additional musicians

- Henry Olsen – bass, orchestration
- Martin Duffy – piano

Technical

- Alan McGee – management
- Jayne Houghton – cover photography
