= More Light (Primal Scream album) =

Studio album by Primal Scream
- Released: 13 May 2013
- Studio: Das Bunker, London; Vox Studios, Los Angeles
- Genre: Alternative rock; psychedelic rock; experimental rock; krautrock; electronica
- Length: 68:28
- Label: Ignition
- Producer: David Holmes

Primal Scream chronology
Beautiful Future (2008)	More Light (2013)	Chaosmosis (2016)

Singles from More Light
- 1. "2013" Released: 25 March 2013; 2. "It's Alright, It's OK" Released: 7 May 2013; 3. "Invisible City" Released: 2 August 2013

More Light is the tenth studio album by Scottish rock band Primal Scream, released on 13 May 2013. The single "It's Alright, It's OK" received airplay on national stations including BBC Radio 2, BBC Radio 6 Music and Absolute Radio and on music channel MTV Rocks, whilst it has also been played on a number of smaller stations including 106.9FM WHCR and Kingstown Radio. It references influential The Gun Club singer Jeffrey Lee Pierce with a take on his song "Goodbye Johnny" and use of the track title "Walking with the Beast". This is their first album since Give Out But Don't Give Up (1994) to not feature bassist Mani.

== Critical reception ==
Professional ratings
Aggregate scores
Source	Rating
AnyDecentMusic?	7.3/10
Metacritic	77/100
Review scores
Source	Rating
AllMusic	4.5/5 stars
The A.V. Club	B+
The Guardian	3/5 stars
The Independent	4/5 stars
Mojo	4/5 stars
NME	8/10
Pitchfork	7.7/10
Q	4/5 stars
Rolling Stone	3.5/5 stars
Uncut	7/10

More Light received highly positive reactions from critics and is perhaps their most critically acclaimed album since XTRMNTR. On Metacritic, the album has a score of 77 out of 100, based on 29 reviews. Neil McCormick of The Daily Telegraph gave a positive review of the album, describing it as "mesmerising" and containing "big, monstrous, mantra-like, psychedelic grooves". He went on to add that More Light should do much to restore Primal Scream's reputation as one of the country's most creative and ambitious rock bands. The music is dense yet uplifting, creating its own tensions with Gillespie's dark, stream-of-consciousness lyrics. Songs like "2013", "Culturecide", "Tenement Kid" and "Walking with the Beast" convey an impression of a highly-strung, heartfelt assault on the inequities of the modern world, before building to the euphoric gospel release of closing track "It's Alright, It's OK".

== Artwork ==
The artwork, designed by Scottish artist Jim Lambie, is based on the artwork from Scottish musician Momus's 1988 album, Tender Pervert.

== Track listing ==
All tracks composed by Andrew Innes and Bobby Gillespie; except where indicated

More Light

No.	Title	Writer(s)	Length
1.	"2013"		9:01
2.	"River of Pain"		6:59
3.	"Culturecide"	Innes, Gillespie, Mark Stewart	4:36
4.	"Hit Void"		4:10
5.	"Tenement Kid"		4:46
6.	"Invisible City"		4:41
7.	"Goodbye Johnny"	Jeffrey Lee Pierce	3:29
8.	"Sideman"		3:54
9.	"Elimination Blues"		5:47
10.	"Turn Each Other Inside Out"	Innes, Gillespie, David Meltzer	4:35
11.	"Relativity"		7:29
12.	"Walking with the Beast"		3:58
13.	"It's Alright, It's OK"		5:09
Total length:			68:28

Extra Light

No.	Title	Writer(s)	Length
1.	"Nothing Is Real / Nothing Is Unreal"		5:07
2.	"Requiem for the Russian Tea Rooms"		3:14
3.	"Running Out of Time"		2:37
4.	"Worm Tamer"	Jim Sclavunos, Martyn P. Casey, Nick Cave, Warren Ellis	5:37
5.	"Theme from More Light"		2:29
6.	"2013 (Weatherall remix)"		8:20
Total length:			27:24

== Personnel ==
Primal Scream

- Bobby Gillespie – vocals, tambourine, handclaps, mellotron, electric piano, drums, percussion
- Andrew Innes – electric, acoustic, and twelve-string guitars, bass guitar, six-string bass, keyboards, electric sitar, synthesizer, autoharp, dulcimer, drones
- Martin Duffy – keyboards
- Darrin Mooney – drums, percussion

Additional personnel

- Fred Adams – trumpet
- Marshall Allen – alto saxophone
- Jay Bellerose – drums
- Nicky Brown – vocal arrangements
- Barrie Cadogan – guitar, backing vocals
- Davey Chegwidden – drums, guiro, percussion, tom-toms
- Keefus Cianca – bells, piano
- Matthew Cooper – design
- Rich Costey – mixing
- Jason Falkner – bass guitar, six-string bass, guitar, synthesizer, engineer
- Geo Gabriel – backing vocals
- Michael Harris – engineering
- Sharlene Hector – backing vocals
- David Henderson – guitar
- Max Heyes – engineering
- David Holmes – engineering, producer
- Jim Hunt – saxophone, flute
- Eric Islip – engineering
- Woody Jackson – engineering, guitar, orchestration
- Sam Johnston – engineering
- Chris Kasych – Pro-Tools
- Jim Lambie – sleeve art
- Brendan Lynch – production, engineering, mixing
- Marco Nelson – bass guitar
- Niall O'Brien – photography
- Ladonna Harley Peters – background vocals
- Robert Plant – backing vocals
- Noel Scott – alto saxophone, tenor saxophone
- Kevin Shields – guitar
- Todd Simon – trumpet
- Paul Stanborough – engineering
- Mark Stewart – backing vocals, whistle
- Steve Tavaglione – alto saxophone, tenor saxophone
- Danny Ray Thompson – baritone saxophone
- Valente Torrez – engineering
- Masa Tsuzki – engineering
- The Unloved – backing vocals
- Tracy Wannomae – alto saxophone
