= Give Out but Don't Give Up =

Studio album by Primal Scream
- Released: 28 March 1994
- Genres: Rock and roll; blues; pop; country; boogie rock; hard rock; R&B; roots rock
- Length: 61:00
- Labels: Creation; Sire
- Producers: David Bianco; George Clinton; Tom Dowd; George Drakoulias; Mike E. Clark

Primal Scream chronology
Screamadelica (1991)	Give Out but Don't Give Up (1994)	Vanishing Point (1997)

Singles from Give Out but Don't Give Up
- 1. "Rocks" Released: 28 February 1994; 2. "Jailbird" Released: 6 June 1994; 3. "(I'm Gonna) Cry Myself Blind" Released: 28 November 1994

Professional ratings
Review scores
Source	Rating
AllMusic	2.5/5 stars
Chicago Tribune	3/4 stars
Encyclopedia of Popular Music	3/5 stars
Entertainment Weekly	B+
The Great Rock Discography	7/10
The Ultimate Music Library	9/10
Q	4/5 stars
The Rolling Stone Album Guide	3/5 stars
Select	5/5
Vox	7/10

Give Out but Don't Give Up is the fourth studio album by Scottish rock band Primal Scream. It was released on 28 March 1994 in the United Kingdom by Creation Records and in the United States by Sire Records. It peaked at number 2 on the UK Albums Chart. Musically, it marked a massive departure from the psychedelic sound of their previous studio album Screamadelica (1991) into one influenced by classic rock and blues music. Its cover art is a cropped version of an untitled photo from the Troubled Waters collection by American photographer William Eggleston. Eggleston included the album in his 2017 Pitchfork list of "the Music That Made Him a Photography Legend."

The record's retro stylings, which were compared to the Rolling Stones and the music of Muscle Shoals Sound Studio, was received with dismay from fans of the acclaimed, genre-bending Screamadelica (1991), and was "one of the most reviled records in recent history" according to one critic, although Primal Scream had explored a similarly rootsy sound on their earliest albums.

The album peaked at number 22 on the US Billboard Heatseekers chart.

A second version of the album, featuring previously lost recordings, was released in 2018 as Give Out But Don’t Give Up: The Original Memphis Recordings.

== Critical reception ==
Reviewing Give Out but Don't Give Up for Select, Adam Higginbotham praised the band for filtering their "homages, influences and straight-up rip-offs" into a unique album, and applauded them for embracing "such apparently alarmingly unfashionable rock 'n' roll and soul attitudes", which they said "indicates a wealth of exactly the kind of sneering insubordination needed in a year otherwise dominated by a lethal cocktail of slim leather ties, Blondie B-sides, an imminent BA Robertson revival and ambient house albums". Mark Bell of Vox wrote that due to the band's enthusiasm on the project, they were not wearing their influences "too firmly on their sleeves", saying: "Allowing for 'classic rock' reference points, this follow-up to 1991's heavy Screamadelica gets the benefit of the doubt and eventually succeeds on its own stop-the-world-I-wanna-get-off in 1974 terms." He concluded: "There are people who will say it's all been done before, what a load of old cobblers etc., but given time and some decent weather I reckon even they'll want a slice."

Less favourably, Paul Lester of Melody Maker wrote that whereas Screamadelica was an "exceptional" album, "Give Out but Don't Give Up, the second most feverishly anticipated record of the last three years, is absolutely f***ing dreadful." He wrote that listeners should not expect any "expansionist" dance-rock collisions, as "Bobby Gillespie may have a staggeringly diverse record collection, but Give Out... is dismally one-dimensional. And it's a dimension called Sticky Fingers. God knows I wanted to ignore the weight of historical baggage on my shoulders, and of course I assume most of you are so young you barely remember Bummed, let alone Let It Bleed, but it has to be said: this is preposterous." Los Angeles Times writer Lorraine Ali criticised the group for mimicking the Rolling Stones and their formula of "blues-based acoustic ballads and sassy, strutting pop numbers, with an occasional country twang thrown in", writing that Primal Scream "should have stuck to its innovative blend of new and old. The band might have intended this derivative sound to be ironic, but it’s just mediocre rock 'n' roll with no soul or substance." Spin writer Eric Weisbard similarly criticised the album for being derivative and sounding like a "musical lab experiment" without a band feel.

A month after release, NME called it "1994's MOST controversial LP – either a retro cop-out or an achingly sincere homage to the American Deep South's wellspring of boogie, blues and soul. It made more sense live, and the release of some ace, mournful singles from Give Out... should convince any floating voters." In June 1994, Steven Daly of Rolling Stone wrote that the record ("an unabashed celebration of rock's rich tapestry") had encouraged music critics to lampoon the group as "retro-rock turncoats peddling reheated boogie a la the 73 Rolling Stones and flying in the face of progress." He added: "What makes the band's alleged crime doubly egregious is its perceived abdication of its role as dance-rock avatar — one of the most innovative outfits of its era."

=== Retrospective ===
In 1999, Tom Ewing of Freaky Trigger included "Rocks" at number 97 in his list of the "Top 100 Singles of the 90s", but noted his original distaste for the song and reflected on the initial reaction to the album:

Give Out But Don’t Give Up ... was met with absolute incredulity. For every powder-fuelled trendy who reckoned they could see what Primal Scream were getting at with this loose, louche trawl through stereotypical rock'n'roll and dodgy Confederacy chic, several more were absolutely heartbroken. I can remember the reactions to "Rocks" among my friends, from mild disappointment through outright mockery to an aghast sense of betrayal. Primal Scream, after all, were the band who had shown the way, who’d seen the error of their indie rock ways and taken plenty of us along with them. Nobody in 1994 much listened to Screamadelica any more, but we all of us owned it. "Bitches keep bitchin'/ Clap keeps an-itchin'" – how could they do this to us?

Retrospectively, AllMusic reviewer Stephen Thomas Erlewine wrote: "What do you do when you redefine the parameters of modern music? If you're Primal Scream, you decide to head to Memphis to tap into the vein of Real American Music," comparing this move to U2's Rattle & Hum (1988). He considered the album to be misconceived and "hampered by the group's stylized idolization", criticising them for becoming "pastiche artists" and adding: "At this point, everything existed on the surface for Primal Scream ... So, Give Out But Don't Give Up is a mess, a record that suggests it's on the verge of delivering a good time but winds up being a dirgey bummer." The Rolling Stone Album Guide contributor Rob Sheffield also commented on the stylistic shift, writing that the group "pretended to be shit-talking blues rockers". He considered the album to be silly "but good fun". In 2000, Spin called it "an unconvincing foray into Black Crowes-style rock'n'soul".

Colin Larkin of The Encyclopedia of Popular Music wrote that despite its "frosty" critical reception, Give Out showcased how "Gillespie had once again reinvented himself and his band." Martin C. Strong of The Great Rock Discography considered the album to be an inevitable disappointment next to the unsurpassed "sheer breadth of vision" of Screamadelica, noting that the group tried "far too hard to achieve a roughshod R&B grit. Where before they had made the Stones' sound their own, now they had come across as mere plagiarists, and over-produced plagiarists at that." He did however note that "Jailbird" and "Rocks" were funkier than "any of the insipid indie competition around at that time", and noted that Gillespie's "epileptic handclap routine" was more endearing than typical rock posturing. Chris Wright of Rock: The Rough Guide wrote that although the record inevitably disappointed those "who wanted another Screamadelica", the album is, if judged on its own merits, a "superb" R&B album that is "filled with uncluttered, soulful rock songs." He praised Gillespie's voice for lifting the material and noted how "the huge cast of musicians never put a foot wrong, playing as if their lives depended on it."

== Track listing ==
All tracks are written by Bobby Gillespie, Andrew Innes and Robert Young, except where noted.

No.	Title	Writer(s)	Length
1.	"Jailbird"		3:46
2.	"Rocks"		3:37
3.	"(I'm Gonna) Cry Myself Blind"		4:30
4.	"Funky Jam"		5:24
5.	"Big Jet Plane"		4:15
6.	"Free"		5:30
7.	"Call on Me"		3:50
8.	"Struttin'"		8:29
9.	"Sad and Blue"		3:27
10.	"Give Out but Don't Give Up"	George Clinton; Gillespie; Innes; Young	6:16
11.	"I'll Be There for You"		6:34
12.	"Everybody Needs Somebody"		5:22

2009 Japanese reissue edition: Disc 1 bonus tracks
No.	Title	Length
13.	"Rocks" (Live at Glastonbury)	3:56
14.	"Rocks" (Jimmy Miller remix)	3:42
15.	"Rockers Dub" (Kris Needs mix)	5:04

2009 Japanese reissue edition: Disc 2
No.	Title	Writer(s)	Length
1.	"Funky Jam" (Club mix)		5:25
2.	"Funky Jam" (Super Droog mix)		8:30
3.	"Jailbird" (The Dust Brothers mix)		5:39
4.	"Jailbird" (The Toxic Trio Stay Free mix)		10:28
5.	"Jailbird" (Sweeney 2 Sabres of Paradise mix)		5:48
6.	"Jailbird" (Weatherall Dub Chapter 3 mix)		12:49
7.	"Struttin' (Back in Our Minds)"		9:54
8.	"Give Out but Don't Give Up" (Portishead remix)	Clinton; Gillespie; Innes; Young	5:51
9.	"Ramblin' Rose" (Live)		2:28
10.	"I'm Losing More Than I'll Ever Have" (Live)		4:52

== Personnel ==
Credits adapted from liner notes.

- Bobby Gillespie – lead vocals
- Denise Johnson – vocals (4, 6, 10)
- George Clinton – vocals (4, 10)
- Jackie Johnson – vocals
- Susan Marshall – vocals
- Robert Young – guitar
- Andrew Innes – guitar
- Martin Duffy – keyboards
- Jim Dickinson – keyboards
- Amp Fiddler – keyboards
- Benmont Tench – keyboards
- David Hood – bass guitar
- George Drakoulias – bass guitar, drums
- Henry Olsen – bass guitar
- Marco Nelson – bass guitar
- Roger Hawkins – drums
- Tony Brock – drums
- Phillip "Toby" Tomanov – drums
- Greg Morrow – percussion
- David Minnick – percussion
- Andrew Love (The Memphis Horns) – horn section
- Wayne Jackson (The Memphis Horns) – horn section
- Charlie Jacobs – harmonica
- William Eggleston – cover photography

== Charts ==
Chart (1994)	Peak position
Australian Albums (ARIA)	28
Austrian Albums (Ö3 Austria)	31
Dutch Albums (Album Top 100)	56
New Zealand Albums (RMNZ)	12
Norwegian Albums (VG-lista)	15
Swedish Albums (Sverigetopplistan)	7
Swiss Albums (Schweizer Hitparade)	41
UK Albums (Official Charts)	2
US Heatseekers Albums (Billboard)	22

== The Original Memphis Recordings ==
In October 2018, the band released Give Out But Don’t Give Up: The Original Memphis Recordings featuring original mixes of tracks recorded by producer Tom Dowd at Ardent Studios, Memphis, with the Muscle Shoals rhythm section in 1993.

Aware of the success of Screamadelica, Creation Records' Alan McGee "thought the Memphis sessions too flat." As a result, the tracks were subsequently re-worked for the official 1994 release of the album, and the original recordings remained forgotten until guitarist Andrew Innes rediscovered the tapes in his basement.

Critical response to the Memphis release was positive, with God Is In The TV describing the collection as "a restrained, heartfelt, tearjerking tribute to the classic Muscle Shoals sound and very possibly the best album of [Primal Scream's] career."

Discussing hearing the material after 25 years, Bobby Gillespie said it "sounded really beautiful, really clear, well-produced; incredibly performed by all the players and musicians and singers… I was blown away when I heard it."

The story behind the rediscovery of the tapes was explored in the documentary, Primal Scream: The Lost Memphis Tapes.

== The Original Memphis Recordings - Track listing ==
No.	Title	Length
1.	"Jailbird"	3:54
2.	"Rocks"	3:51
3.	"Call On Me"	3:26
4.	"Everybody Needs Somebody"	6:06
5.	"Sad & Blue"	3:49
6.	"Big Jet Plane"	5:33
7.	"Free"	6:55
8.	"Jesus"	6:42
9.	"Cry Myself Blind"	4:53

Ardent Outtakes: Disc 2
No.	Title	Length
1.	"Billy / To Love Someone"	4:48
2.	"Memphis Groove" (Improvised Song Jam)	5:12
3.	"Sad and Blue" (Early Rehearsal Jam)	2:30
4.	"Blue Moon Of Kentucky / Trying To Get To You"	1:22
5.	"Big Jet Plane" (Early Rehearsal Jam / Tom Dowd Instructions)	5:15
6.	"Free" (Bobby Vocal / Full Band Rehearsal Jam)	5:46
7.	"Everybody Needs Somebody" (Alternative Recording)	5:55
8.	"Country Guitar"	1:30
9.	"Jailbird Guitar"	1:08
10.	"Jesus" (Monitor Mix)	7:15
11.	"Funky Jam" (Original Recording)	4:50
12.	"Free" (Early Rehearsal Sitar / Piano / Bobby Vocal)	4:58
13.	"Call On Me" (Monitor Mix)	3:26
14.	"Cry Myself Blind (Monitor Mix) / Big Jet Plane (Sitar Version)"	9:43
15.	"All I Have To Do Is Dream"	1:39
