= Primal Scream =

Scottish rock band

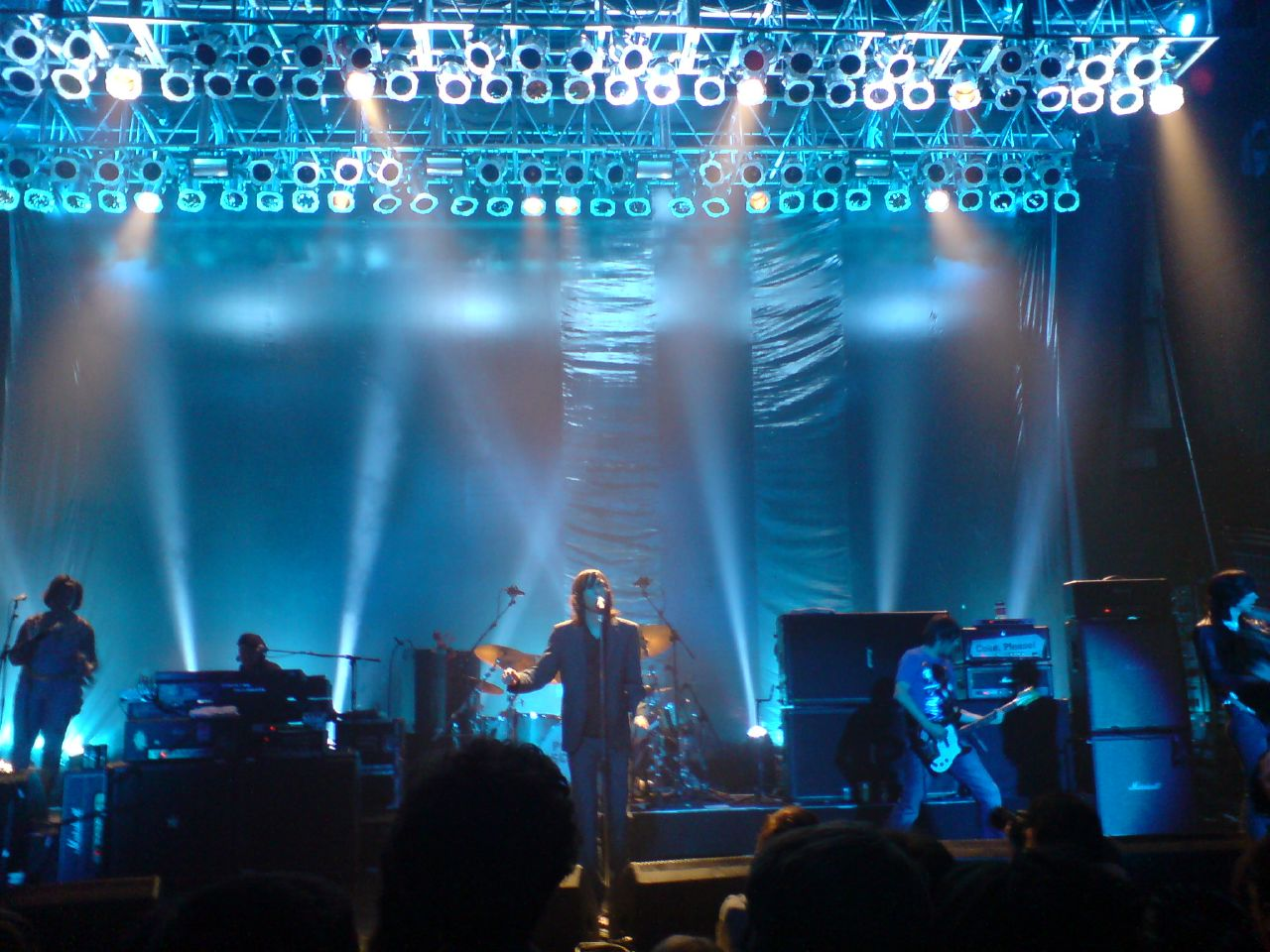
- Primal Scream performing in Southampton in 2006

Background information
- Origin: Glasgow, Scotland
- Genres: Alternative rock; electronic; alternative dance; neo-psychedelia; house; indie pop (early)
- Works: Primal Scream discography
- Years active: 1982–present
- Labels: Elevation; Creation; Columbia; Intercord; B-Unique; First International
- Members: Bobby Gillespie; Andrew Innes; Darrin Mooney
- Past members: Gary "Mani" Mounfield; Barrie Cadogan; Jim Beattie; Judith Boyle; Martin Duffy; Debbie Googe; Paul Harte; Jim Hunt; Denise Johnson; Duncan Mackay; Tom McGurk; Stewart May; Henry Olsen; Steve Sidelnyk; Kevin Shields; Gavin Skinner; Martin St. John; Phillip "Toby" Tomanov; Paul Mulreany; Robert "Throb" Young; Simone Butler
- Website: primalscream.net

Primal Scream are a Scottish rock band originally formed in 1982 in Glasgow by Bobby Gillespie (vocals) and Jim Beattie (guitar). The band's current lineup consists of Gillespie, Andrew Innes (guitar) and Darrin Mooney (drums).

Primal Scream had been performing live from 1982 to 1984, but their career did not take off until Gillespie left his position as drummer of The Jesus and Mary Chain. The band were a key part of the mid-1980s indie pop scene before taking on a more psychedelic and garage rock-influenced sound. They later incorporated elements of dance music with their 1991 album Screamadelica, which broke them into the mainstream. The band have continued to explore different styles on subsequent albums, experimenting with blues, trip hop and industrial rock. Their most recent album, Come Ahead, was released on 8 November 2024.

== History ==
=== Formation and early years (1982–1984) ===
Bobby Gillespie moved to Mount Florida in southeastern Glasgow, where he attended King's Park Secondary School, where he first met Robert Young. Another schoolfriend was Alan McGee, who took Gillespie to see his first concert, Thin Lizzy. McGee and Gillespie were heavily influenced by punk rock, and they joined a local punk band, the Drains, in 1978. The Drains' guitarist was a 15-year-old Andrew Innes. The band was short-lived, as Innes and McGee moved to London while Gillespie chose to remain in Glasgow.

After the punk movement ended, Gillespie became disenchanted with mainstream new wave music. He met another schoolfriend who shared his outlook, Jim Beattie, and they recorded "elemental noise tapes", in which Gillespie would bang two dustbin lids together and Beattie played fuzz-guitar. They soon moved on to the Velvet Underground and the Byrds cover songs before starting to write their own songs, based on Jah Wobble and Peter Hook basslines. Gillespie later said that the band "didn't really exist, but we did it every night for something to do." They named themselves after a line in the title track of The Fall's 1979 debut album Live at the Witch Trials. Still essentially a partnership, Primal Scream first played live in 1982.

=== First recordings, Sonic Flower Groove and Primal Scream (1984–1989) ===
Their first recording session, for McGee's independent label Essential Records, produced a single track entitled "The Orchard", with Judith Boyle on vocals. Beattie later claimed that they burned the master tape. After the aborted recording, Gillespie joined the Jesus and Mary Chain as their drummer, and alternated between the two bands. While the Jesus and Mary Chain became notorious for their chaotic gigs, Gillespie and Beattie expanded Primal Scream's lineup to include schoolfriend Young on bass, rhythm guitarist Stuart May, drummer Tom McGurk, and tambourine player Martin St. John. This lineup was signed to Creation Records, an independent record label founded by Alan McGee, and recorded the group's debut single, "All Fall Down", which received positive reviews.

After the release of the single, Gillespie was told by the Jesus and Mary Chain leaders William and Jim Reid that he was to either dissolve Primal Scream to join their band full-time or resign. Gillespie chose to remain with Primal Scream. Stuart May was replaced by Paul Harte, and the group released a new single, "Crystal Crescent". Its B-side, "Velocity Girl", was released on the C86 compilation, which led to their being associated with the scene of the same name. the band strongly disliked this, Gillespie saying that other groups in that scene "can't play their instruments and they can't write songs."

The band toured throughout 1986, and Gillespie became disenchanted with the quality of their performances. He said that there "was always something missing, musically or in attitude." They switched to McGee's newly set-up Warner Bros. subsidiary Elevation Records. Before the band entered Rockfield Studios in Wales to record their debut album, McGurk was asked to leave. The group subsequently began recording using session players. They spent four weeks recording with producer Stephen Street before deciding to halt the sessions.

May was subsequently dismissed; Gillespie's former bandmate Innes was brought in as his replacement, and the band found a new drummer, Gavin Skinner. With their new lineup, the band re-entered the studio, this time in London with producer Mayo Thompson. By the time Sonic Flower Groove was completed, it had cost £100,000. The album reached number 62 on the British charts and received poor reviews, with AllMusic calling it "pristine but dull." The backlash from the album caused internal strife within the band. Beattie and Skinner subsequently resigned.

The band, now consisting of Gillespie, Innes and Young, relocated to Brighton to regroup. Young switched to guitar, and they recruited bassist Henry Olsen and drummer Phillip "Toby" Tomanov, who had both been in Nico's backing band, the Faction. They traded in their jangle pop sound for a harder rock edge, or as Gillespie said, "[w]e had found rock 'n' roll." The band re-signed to Creation Records and released their first single in two years, "Ivy, Ivy, Ivy". This was followed by a full album, Primal Scream. The band's new sound was met with poor reviews, NME called it "confused and lacking in cohesion". Fans responded as unfavourably as the critics, with many of the old fans being disappointed or simply confused by the new sound. Both Sonic Flower Groove and Primal Scream featured contributions from Felt keyboardist Martin Duffy.

=== Screamadelica (1990–1992) ===
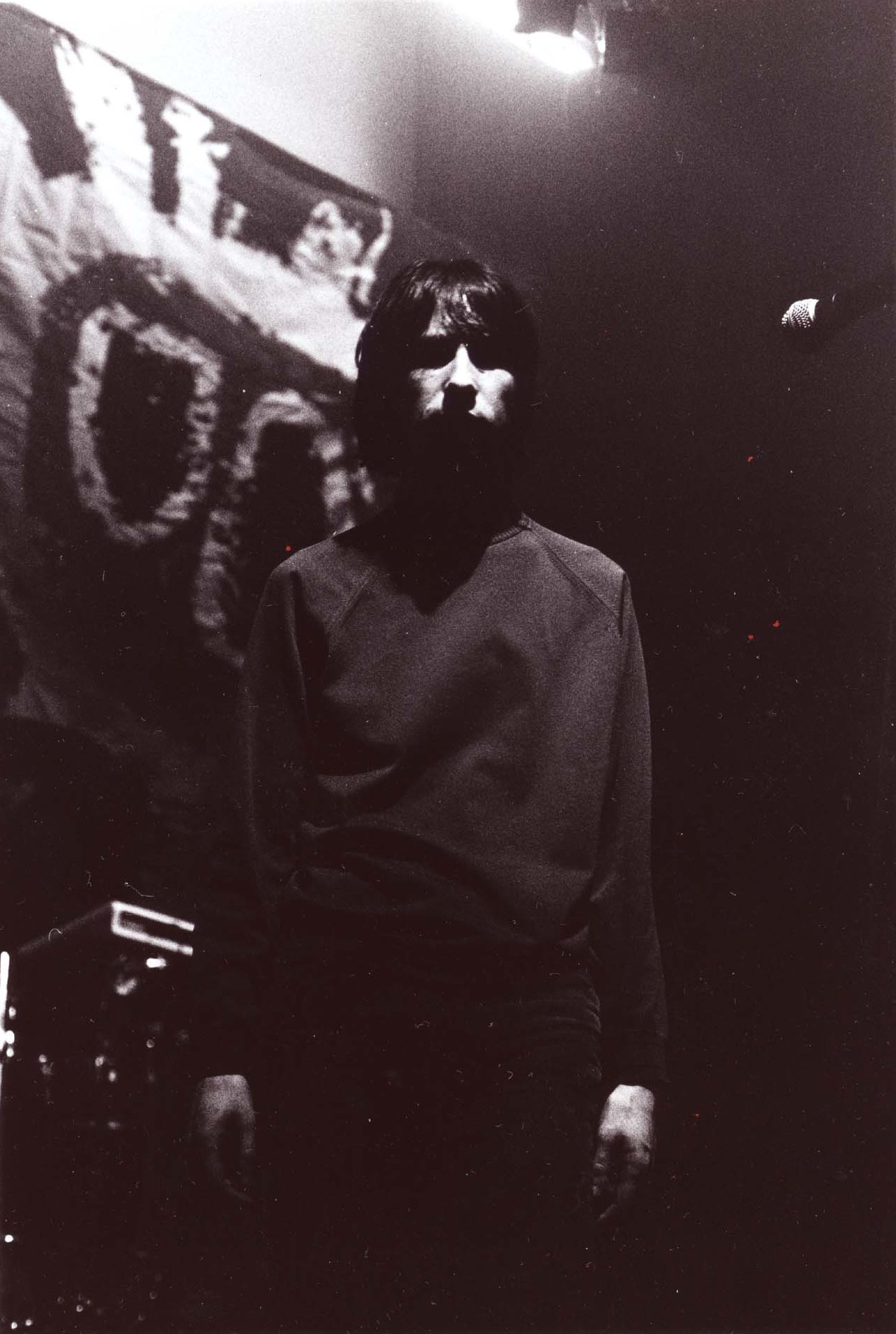
Bobby Gillespie on tour in 1991 at Club Citta, Kawasaki, Japan

The band were first introduced to the acid house scene by McGee in 1988. They were at first sceptical; Gillespie said: "I always remember being quite fascinated by it but not quite getting it." The band developed a taste for it and began attending raves. The band met up with DJ Andrew Weatherall at a rave, and he was given a copy of "I'm Losing More Than I'll Ever Have", a track from Primal Scream, to remix for one of his shows. Weatherall added a drum loop from an Italian bootleg mix of Edie Brickell's "What I Am", a sample of Gillespie singing a line from Robert Johnson's "Terraplane Blues" and the central introductory sample from the Peter Fonda B-movie The Wild Angels. The resulting track, "Loaded", became the band's first major hit, reaching number 16 on the UK Singles Chart. This was followed by another single, "Come Together", which reached number 26.

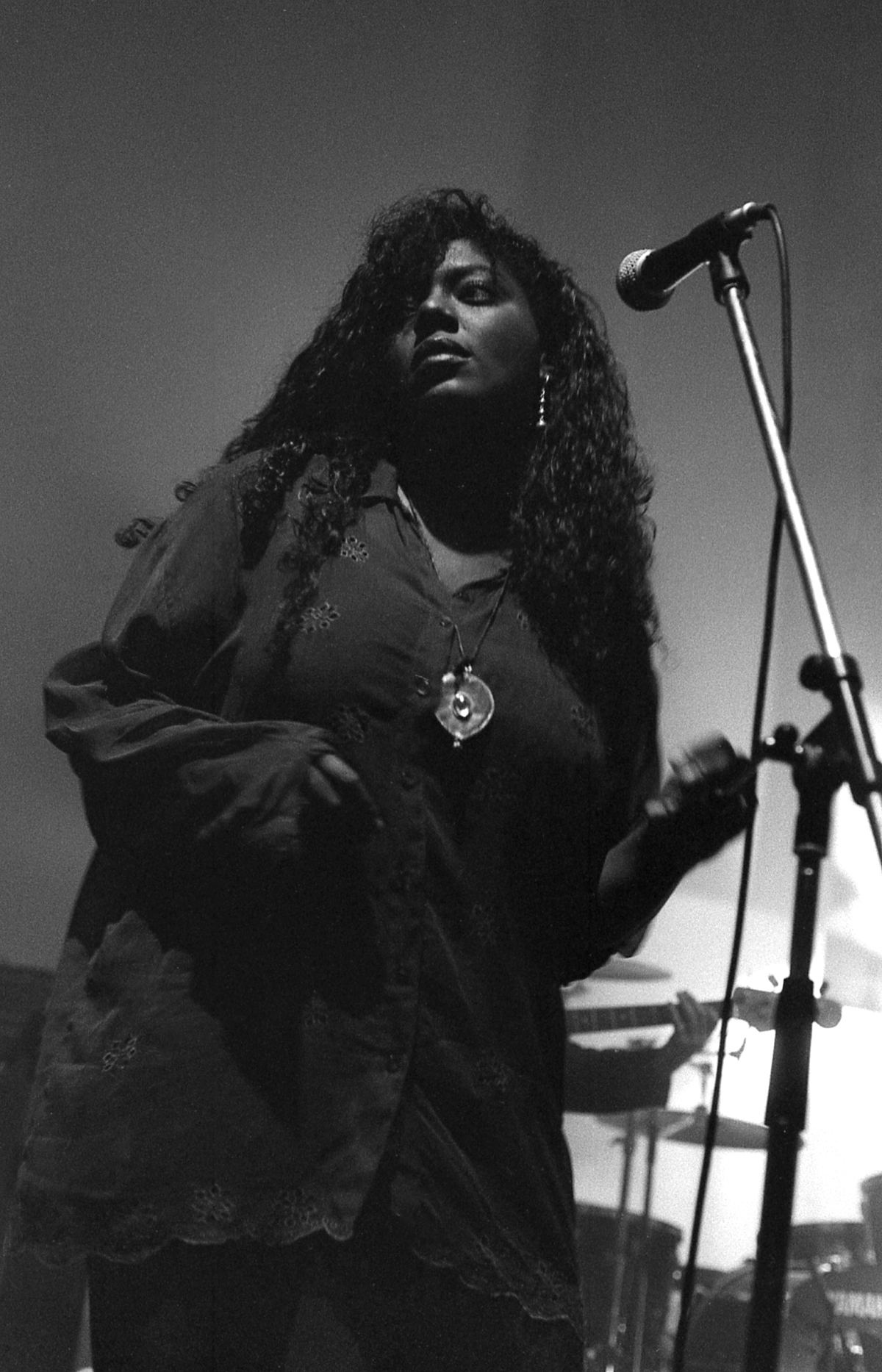
Denise Johnson on tour in 1991 at Club Citta, Kawasaki, Japan

The band entered the studio with Weatherall, Hugo Nicolson, the Orb and Jimmy Miller producing, and Martin Duffy now full-time on keyboards after Felt disbanded. They released two more singles, "Higher Than the Sun" and "Don't Fight It, Feel It" which featured the lead vocals of Manchester singer Denise Johnson. The album Screamadelica was released in late 1991 to positive reviews. Ink Blot Magazine said that the album was "both of its time and timeless." The album was also a commercial success, reaching number eight on the UK chart. The album won the first Mercury Music Prize, beating Gillespie's former band the Jesus and Mary Chain.

The supporting tour kicked off in Amsterdam, and it included a performance at the Glastonbury festival before coming to an end in Sheffield. Throughout the tour the band and their increasingly large entourage gained notoriety for their large narcotic intake. Around this time, the band recorded the Dixie Narco EP. Some of the tracks had a more American blues rock sound than previously, and displayed a P-Funk influence.

=== Give Out But Don't Give Up (1992–1995) ===
The band began work on their fourth album in Roundhouse Studios in London in September 1992.

In March 1994, the first single from the new album, "Rocks", was released. It was the band's highest-charting single to date, reaching number seven on the UK charts. The single was not received well, with NME calling them "dance traitors". The album Give Out But Don't Give Up was released in May to mixed reviews. Whereas some praised the band's new the Rolling Stones-influenced sound, some dismissed the album as tired and drawing too heavily on their influences. Two more singles were released from the album, "Jailbird" and "(I'm Gonna) Cry Myself Blind", both of which charted progressively lower.

While touring in support of the album, relations within the band began to wear down. The band's American tour, when they supported Depeche Mode, was, in the words of manager Alex Nightingale, "the closest we've come to the band splitting up." After the completion of the tour, the band remained quiet for a long period of time. Gillespie later remarked that he was unsure if the band would continue. The only release during this period was a single, "The Big Man and the Scream Team Meet the Barmy Army Uptown", a collaboration with Irvine Welsh and On-U Sound, which caused controversy due to offensive lyrics about Rangers F.C. and their fan base.

=== Vanishing Point (1996–1998) ===
After a short hiatus, the band returned with a new lineup. Gary "Mani" Mounfield, fresh from the well-publicised break-up of his previous band, the Stone Roses, was added as the band's new bassist, and Paul Mulraney was added as their new drummer. The arrival of Mani revitalized the group, who were considering disbanding after the failure of Give Out. The album was recorded in the band's personal studio in two months, and was mixed in another month. Most of the recording was engineered by Innes, and produced by Brendan Lynch and Andrew Weatherall.

The music on the album had a complex shoegazing dance/dub rhythm, harking back to the crossover success of Screamadelica, yet sounding significantly darker. Some songs on the album were inspired by cult 1971 film Vanishing Point; Gillespie said that they wanted to create an alternative soundtrack for the film. Other lyrics were inspired by the band's past experiences with drug abuse. Gillespie described the album as "an anarcho-syndicalist speedfreak road movie record!" The first single released from the album, "Kowalski", was released in May 1997, and reached number 8 on the British charts. The album, titled Vanishing Point after the film, was released in July and revitalized the band's commercial viability. It received almost positive reviews upon release, Entertainment Weekly calling it a "swirling, hypnotic acid-trip", and Musik saying that "this group's place in the history book of late 20th Century music is assured." The inclusion on the album of the title track from the film Trainspotting also helped cement the band's place in alternative modern culture.

The band scheduled a short supporting tour to take place during July. The band had to postpone the dates. This led to speculation that there were problems within the band, and that one of the members may resign. The band's press agent issued a statement saying "[i]t's not a drugs thing and it's not a nervous breakdown." Before the tour was scheduled to begin, Mulraney left the band and they were forced to use a drum machine. The initial dates were poorly received, but they eventually hired drummer Darrin Mooney and the gigs improved. Throughout the Vanishing Point tour Primal Scream employed the up-and-coming Asian Dub Foundation as a support act, helping them to break into the mainstream.

In February 1998 the band released the "If They Move, Kill 'Em" EP. This notably featured the bands' first collaboration with former My Bloody Valentine guitarist Kevin Shields, on his remix of the title track. Later that year, Shields joined the band on tour and would have a major influence on their sound in the next few years. After the release of the album, a collection of alternative mixes/remixes from Vanishing Point were released as the album Echo Dek, with the bulk of mixes done by Adrian Sherwood.

=== XTRMNTR and Evil Heat (1999–2005) ===
Recording sessions for the band's sixth album went well. The band were for the most part free of drugs, and their lineup had stabilised. Despite their new-found peace, the band pursued a harsher and angrier musical direction. Many of the songs they wrote had overtly political lyrics, Gillespie said the band wished to convey "What it's like to be in Britain in this day and age." The album featured multiple guest appearances, including the Chemical Brothers, New Order's Bernard Sumner, and Kevin Shields, who had become a semi-permanent member.

The first single from XTRMNTR, "Swastika Eyes", was released in November 1999. The song's overtly political content, Gillespie said it was about "American international terrorism", made it controversial. Nevertheless, it was a hit, charting at No. 22 on the British charts. XTRMNTR itself fared well, reaching No. 3. The political content was well received, with Allmusic calling it a "nasty, fierce realization of an entire world that has... lost the plot.". In 2009 NME charted XTRMNTR at No. 3 in The Top 100 Greatest Albums of The Decade. The song was on the soundtrack of the 2004 film Football Factory, whose plot involved football hooliganism.

In 2000, the band began recording their seventh album, Evil Heat, released in 2002. Though the political content was not as strong as the previous album, there was a song originally slated for the album entitled "Bomb the Pentagon", which was reworked into the song "Rise" after the 11 September attacks. The album, like many of Primal Scream's previous albums, had multiple producers. Shields produced several tracks, and Andrew Weatherall produced three tracks, his first work with the band since Vanishing Point. Kate Moss sang professionally for the first time with single "Some Velvet Morning", a version of the Lee Hazlewood/Nancy Sinatra song. The album also featured another guest appearance, Led Zeppelin singer Robert Plant. In 2003 the double CD album Dirty Hits was released containing the better known works and some previously unheard versions and remixes of those tunes.

In June 2005, Primal Scream played a controversial set at the Glastonbury Festival, throughout which Gillespie was playfully abusive to the crowd and was alleged ^{[by whom?]} to have made Nazi salutes during the song "Swastika Eyes," though this is not confirmed. They were eventually forced off by officials after overrunning their allotted time; the festival organisers were at that point already annoyed at the band when, in response to their invitation to join other recording artists in signing a Make Poverty History poster which would be auctioned off for charity, lead singer Bobby Gillespie instead altered the poster so that it read "Make Israel History". Gillespie later said that this was to show his support for the Palestinian cause.

=== Riot City Blues, Beautiful Future and Screamadelica 20th anniversary (2006–2012) ===
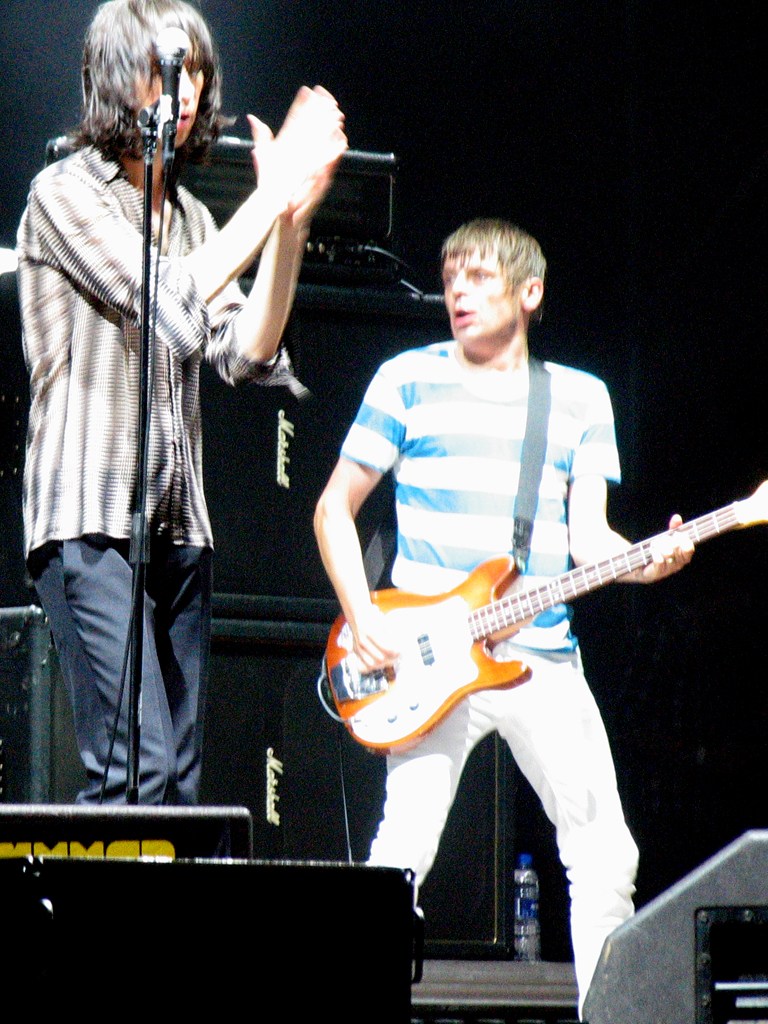
At Summercase, 2008

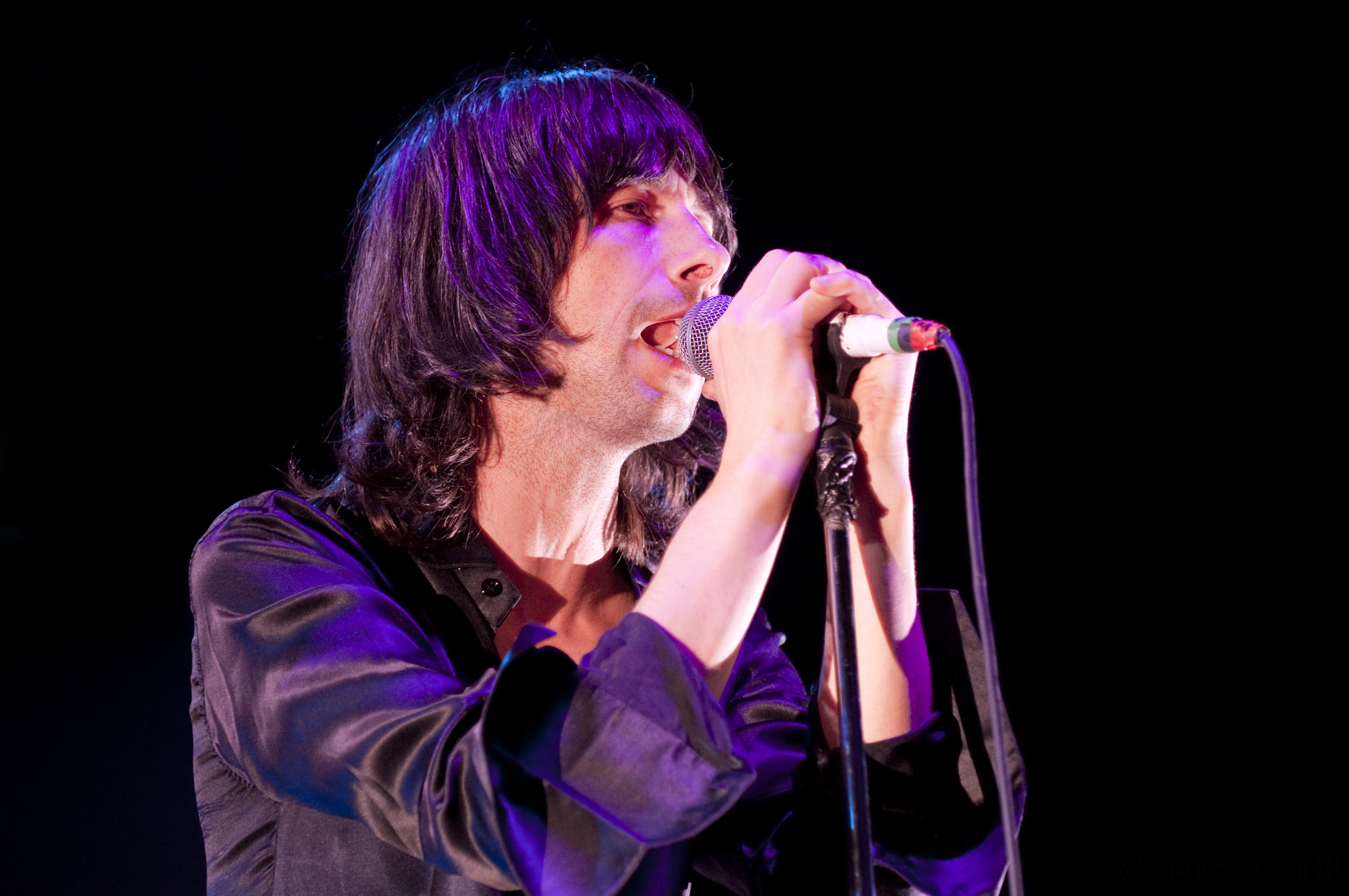
In 2009

In an interview with NME, Gillespie said that the band had written "euphoric rock 'n' roll songs" for their next album. They intended to capture the energy of their live performances. The band chose Youth as their producer, which led to speculation that they had fallen out with Shields. Although the band themselves admitted that they were unsure of the situation, Shields subsequently joined them on tour.

The album's first single, "Country Girl", was released on 22 May 2006, and regular airplay resulted in a chart entry of number 5, their highest ever. It was also used by the BBC in the closing credits of the Grand National 2007 and as the backing track to a video celebrating the successes of the Scottish racing driver Dario Franchitti in the 2007 Autosport Awards ceremony in London. The album Riot City Blues was released in June and reached number five on the UK Album Charts. However, it received mixed reviews: Pitchfork Media called it "flat and dead", while AllMusic called it "a refreshingly retro rock & roll album".

In support of the album, the band toured the UK, along with selected dates in Europe. The band released their first DVD, Riot City Blues Tour, in August 2007. The DVD featured clips of the band's performance in London, as well as all their music videos and an interview with Gillespie and Mani.

On 26 August 2006, bassist Mani was arrested at the Leeds music festival, after what was said to be a drunken brawl. However, he was soon released and the band's appearance at the festival went ahead. Also around this time, Young left the band to go on sabbatical, failing to appear on their November 2006 UK tour. It was later stated by Bobby Gillespie that Young was unlikely to make a return. He was temporarily replaced by Barrie Cadogan of Little Barrie. Young died in September 2014.

After touring Screamadelica for most of 2011, on 18 October Gary Mounfield revealed he had left the band due to the reformation of his original band the Stone Roses. Debbie Googe (of My Bloody Valentine) filled in on bass for the band's 2012 summer dates, before Simone Butler joined as full-time bassist in October 2012.

Primal Scream supported the Stone Roses at their Heaton Park concert in Manchester on 29 June 2012.

=== More Light and Chaosmosis (2013–2018) ===
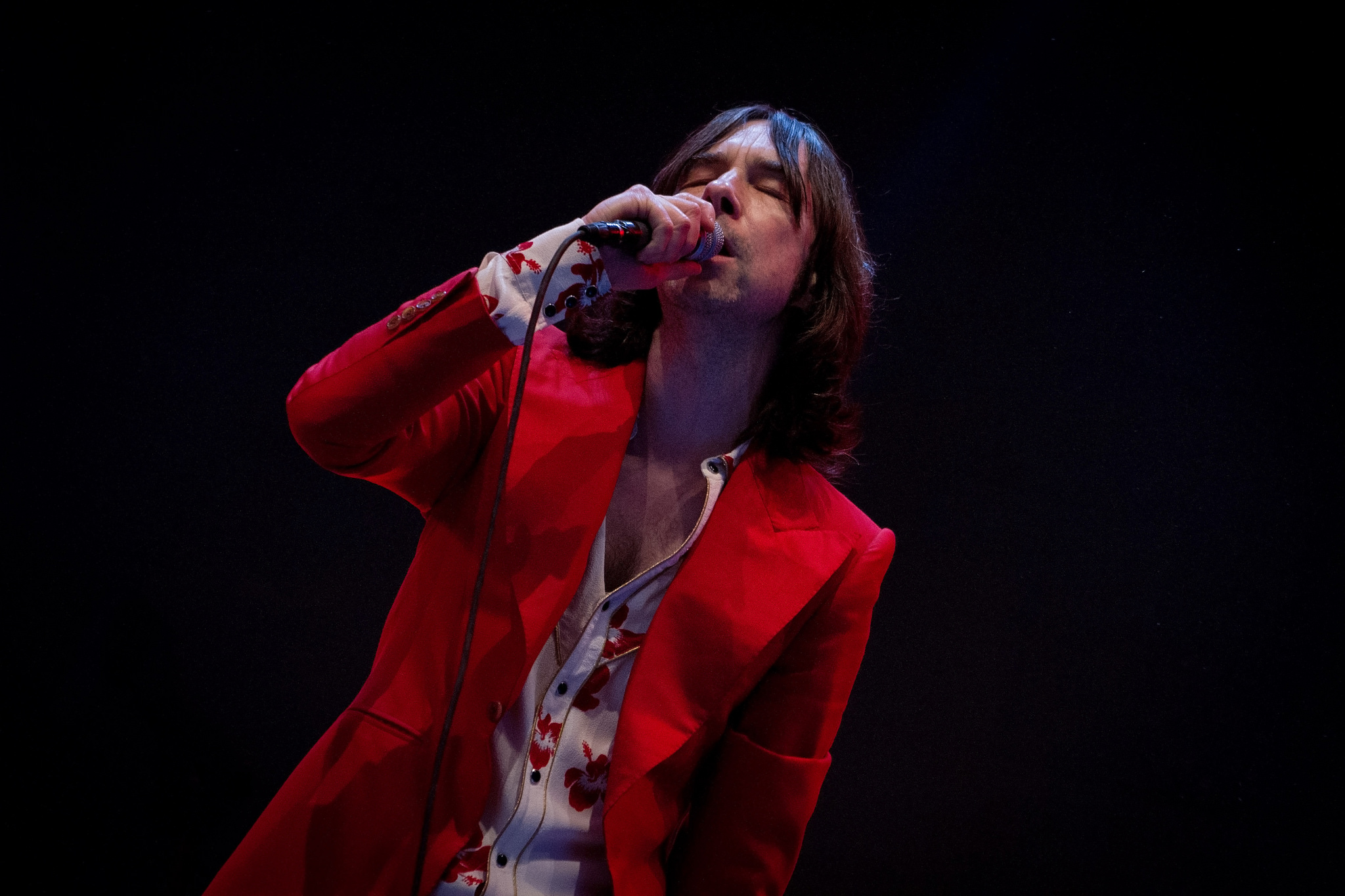
Primal Scream en Rock en Conce

The band's tenth album, More Light, was released in May 2013 on the band's own label, First International, via Ignition Records. The new album was produced by David Holmes, who confirmed the release on his Facebook page on 11 January 2013. The first track taken from the album is "2013" with a music video directed by Rei Nadal. The first single proper is "It's Alright, It's OK", which was played in the UK by both BBC Radio 2 and 6 Music, as well as supported by leading alternative music stations XFM and Absolute Radio. It also appears on the soundtrack for Freaks of Nature (2015), playing over the final scene and end credits. The second single is "Invisible City".

Former guitarist Robert "Throb" Young died in September 2014.

Their eleventh album Chaosmosis was released on 18 March 2016.

In August 2018 it was announced that the band would release the original long-lost recordings made for Give Out But Don't Give Up for the first time, which were made when the band went to Memphis's Ardent Studios in 1993 to work on a new album with producer Tom Dowd and the Muscle Shoals Rhythm Section.

=== Maximum Rock'n'Roll: The Singles and Come Ahead (2019–present) ===
On 24 May 2019 the band released a third compilation album, Maximum Rock'n'Roll: The Singles. The album contains seventeen tracks spanning the period from 1986 till 2016.

In 2022 Primal Scream played at the Victorious Festival in Portsmouth. In April, the band sold song rights of fifty percent of their back catalogue to BMG. The deal involved Gillespie, Innes and the estate of Robert Young.

Martin Duffy died in December 2022 at the age of 55. Following his death, Duffy's son, Louie, made a statement at his father's inquest. Louie claimed that despite playing with the band for over 30 years, he was paid only as a session musician.

On 23 May 2023, Primal Scream announced that they would be performing as a 12-piece band for their upcoming tour dates, with the core line-up augmented by members of the House Gospel Choir on backing vocals, Alex White of Fat White Family on saxophone, and keyboards by former Go-Kart Mozart member Terry Miles who had also previously played with the band in Martin Duffy's absence.

The band released the single "Love Insurrection" in July 2024 and simultaneously announced their twelfth studio album Come Ahead for release on 8 November 2024.

The band features in the book Postcards from Scotland detailing the 1980s and 1990s independent music scene in Scotland.

In 2025, the band signed an open letter in support of the hip-hop trio Kneecap which opposed a "clear, concerted attempt to censor and ultimately deplatform" the group.

In September 2025, the band joined the "No Music For Genocide" boycott to geo-block their music from music streaming platforms in Israel in protest of the Gaza genocide.

Gary "Mani" Mounfield died in November 2025 at the age of 63. The band dedicated "I'm Losing More Than I'll Ever Have" to Mounfield during their Manchester gig on 22 November. This turned out to be Simone Butler's last show with Primal Scream, as the band brought in Phil Mossman, longtime touring guitarist for Andrew Weatherall's group The Sabres of Paradise, to play bass for their full album performance of XTMRNTR at the Roundhouse in London on 8 December.

The XTRMNTR show at the Roundhouse provoked controversy due to the visuals during the performance of "Swastika Eyes" showing images of swastikas inside Star of Davids rotating in the eyes of Benjamin Netanyahu and other Israeli political figues, in addition to other world leaders, including Javier Milei, Keir Starmer, and Donald Trump. The Community Security Trust, a Jewish charity, said it had reported the British band to the police over the incident.

The charity Campaign Against Antisemitism said: "The Nazi swastika represents the ideology that inspired people to industrially slaughter six million innocent Jewish men, women and children by bullet, gas and any other means available. "To visually combine that with the Star of David - the pre-eminent symbol of Judaism - is absolutely sickening and totally inexcusable." The group defended the display stating “It is meant to provoke debate, not hate. In a free, pluralistic and liberal society freedom of expression is a right which we choose to exercise.” The band's recently-announced headlining slot at the Trentham Live festival scheduled for 21 August 2026 was then cancelled because "the graphics used at a recent Primal Scream concert do not align with our values."

On 28 January 2026, Simone Butler announced her departure from Primal Scream.

== Awards and nominations ==
Award	Year	Nominee(s)	Category	Result	Ref.
MTV Europe Music Awards	2002	"Miss Lucifer"	Best Video	Nominated	
UK Festival Awards	2006	Primal Scream	Festival Feel-Good Act	Won	
UK Festival Awards	2007	Primal Scream	Best Headline Act	Nominated	
Vodafone Live Music Awards	2007	Riot City Blues Tour	Live Music DVD	Nominated	

== Members ==
=== Current members ===
- Bobby Gillespie – lead vocals (1982–present)
- Andrew Innes – guitars, keyboards, backing vocals (1987–present)
- Darrin Mooney – drums, percussion (1997–present)

==== Current touring musicians ====
- Terry Miles – keyboards (2023–present)
- Alex White – saxophone (2023–present)
- Phil Mossman – bass (2025-present)

=== Former members and contributors ===
- Robert "Throb" Young – bass guitar (1982–1988), guitars, keyboards, backing vocals (1988–2006; died 2014)
- Jim Beattie – guitars, keyboards (1982–1987)
- Tom McGurk – drums (1982–1987)
- Stuart May – guitars (1985–1986)
- Paul Harte – guitars (1986)
- Martin St. John – percussion (1986–1987)
- Dave Morgan – drums (1987)
- Gavin Skinner – drums (1987–1988)
- Henry Olsen – bass guitar (1988–1995)
- Phillip "Toby" Toman – drums (1988–1995)
- Martin Duffy – keyboards, synthesizers, turntables (1989–2022; died 2022)
- Denise Johnson – co-lead and backing vocals, tambourine (1990–1995; died 2020)
- Gary "Mani" Mounfield – bass guitar (1996–2011; died 2025)
- Paul Mulreany – drums, programming (1996–1997)
- Kevin Shields – guitars, backing vocals (1997–2006)
- Barrie Cadogan – guitars, backing vocals, keyboards (2006–2015)
- Debbie Googe – bass guitar (2012)
- Simone Butler – bass guitar, backing vocals, keyboards, percussion (2012–2025)

== Discography ==
- Sonic Flower Groove (1987)
- Primal Scream (1989)
- Screamadelica (1991)
- Give Out But Don't Give Up (1994)
- Vanishing Point (1997)
- XTRMNTR (2000)
- Evil Heat (2002)
- Riot City Blues (2006)
- Beautiful Future (2008)
- More Light (2013)
- Chaosmosis (2016)
- Come Ahead (2024)

== See also ==
- List of bands from Glasgow
- List of Scottish musicians
