= Rocks (song) =

1994 single by Primal Scream

Single by Primal Scream

from the album Give Out but Don't Give Up
- A-side: "Funky Jam" (Hot Ass mix)
- B-side: "Everybody Needs Somebody"
- Released: 28 February 1994
- Genre: Alternative rock
- Length: 3:36
- Label: Creation
- Songwriters: Bobby Gillespie; Andrew Innes; Robert Young
- Producer: Tom Dowd

Primal Scream singles chronology
"Damaged" (1992)	"Rocks" / "Funky Jam" (1994)	"Jailbird" (1994)

"Rocks" is a song by the Scottish rock band Primal Scream from their fourth studio album, Give Out but Don't Give Up (1994). This track was the first indication of the band's evolution in musical genre, contrasting with the approaches used in Primal Scream's previous album, titled Screamadelica, which had gotten released in 1991 and featured dance-related leanings. "Rocks" (and the Give Out but Don't Give Up album as a whole) feature a more bluesy hard rock approach akin to arena-friendly songs of the past, being inspired by British artists such as T. Rex, the Rolling Stones, and Faces.

"Rocks" was released as a single on 28 February 1994, and the track reached number seven on the UK Singles Chart as a double A-side with another of the band's songs: the Hot Ass mix of "Funky Jam". Together, they were the highest-charting Primal Scream single until "Country Girl" reached number five in 2006. In 2024, the song received a gold certification from the British Phonographic Industry (BPI) for sales and streams exceeding 400,000.

== Critical reception ==
In retrospective terms, music journalist Steve Huey (who has also been associated with AllMusic) highlighted the song as a part of a musical trend involving "guitar-oriented, post-Nirvana alternative rock" performed "by bands who received some measure of radio or [even] MTV exposure". He described Primal Scream in the context of "Rocks" as one of a group of "groundbreaking cult artists who scored at least a little crossover success in the alternative mainstream" alongside bands such as the Afghan Whigs, Dinosaur Jr., and Screaming Trees. Similarly, Johnny Loftus (of the same publication) retrospectively described "Rocks" as sounding "raucous" and wrote in a supportive yet glib fashion that the song "is sure to please your English foreign exchange student friend."

== Music video ==
The accompanying music video for "Rocks" was directed by Chris Symes and produced by him for Propaganda. It was released on 28 February 1994 and features a hedonistic glam rock shot at Million Dollar Babes with 200 of London's grooviest clubbers.

== Track listings ==
All tracks were written by Bobby Gillespie, Andrew Innes, and Robert Young.

- UK 7-inch and cassette single
1. "Rocks" – 3:36
2. "Funky Jam" (Hot Ass mix) – 5:21
- UK 12-inch and CD single; Japanese CD single
1. "Rocks" – 3:36
2. "Funky Jam" (Hot Ass mix) – 5:21
3. "Funky Jam" (club mix) – 5:27
- US and New Zealand 7-inch single
1. "Rocks" (album version) – 3:36
2. "Everybody Needs Somebody" (album version) – 5:22

== Charts ==
=== Weekly charts ===
Chart (1994)	Peak position
Australia (ARIA)	43
Belgium (Ultratop 50 Flanders)	50
Canada Top Singles (RPM)	47
Europe (Eurochart Hot 100)	21
Europe (European Hit Radio)	28
Iceland (Íslenski Listinn Topp 40)	5
Ireland (IRMA)	12
Netherlands (Dutch Top 40)	34
Netherlands (Single Top 100)	18
New Zealand (Recorded Music NZ)	8
Scottish Singles Sales (Official Charts)	4
UK Singles (Official Charts)	7
UK Airplay (Music Week)	13
UK Indie (Music Week)	1
US Bubbling Under Hot 100 (Billboard)	7
US Alternative Airplay (Billboard)	16
US Mainstream Rock (Billboard)	29

=== Year-end charts ===
Chart (1994)	Position
Iceland (Íslenski Listinn Topp 40)	76
UK Singles (OCC)	170

== Certifications ==
Region	Certification	Certified units/sales
United Kingdom (BPI)	Gold	400,000^{‡}
^{‡} Sales+streaming figures based on certification alone.

== Release history ==
Region	Date	Format(s)	Label(s)	Ref.
United Kingdom	28 February 1994	7-inch vinyl; 12-inch vinyl; CD; cassette	Creation	
Australia	7 March 1994	CD; cassette	Creation	
Japan	24 March 1994	CD	Creation	

== Cover versions ==
The Faces' Rod Stewart would later cover the song, including a version on his 1998 album When We Were the New Boys. Music journalist Stephen Thomas Erlewine highlighted the peculiarity of Stewart "tackling the music of his Brit-pop offspring" while praising the track for AllMusic. Erlewine directly compared the artist's assertive interpretation of "Rocks" to Stewart's previously released song "Hot Legs".
