= Elevation Records =

British record label

Elevation was a record label set up as a joint venture between Creation Records and WEA in 1987. Frustrated with the limitations of independent distribution and financing, Alan McGee set up the label to get wider distribution and sales for some of the bands on Creation, with a view to generating additional funds for investment in other Creation artists. The label released albums and several singles by Primal Scream, The Weather Prophets, and Edwyn Collins, although the deal with WEA collapsed due to disappointing sales.

McGee described the label shortly after its collapse as his "biggest mistake", saying that WEA expected instant hits.

== Releases ==
=== Albums ===
- ELV1: The Weather Prophets - Mayflower (April 1987) UK #67
- ELV2: Primal Scream - Sonic Flower Groove (October 1987) UK #62

=== Singles ===
- ACID1/1T/1TX: The Weather Prophets - "She Comes From the Rain" (March 1987) UK #62
- ACID2/2T: The Weather Prophets - "Why Does the Rain" (July 1987)
- ACID3/3T: Primal Scream - "Gentle Tuesday" (June 1987)
- ACID4/4T: Edwyn Collins = "Don't Shilly Shally" (May 1987)
- ACID5/5T: Primal Scream - "Imperial" (September 1987)
- ACID6/6T/6B: Edwyn Collins - "My Beloved Girl" (November 1987)
