= Denise Johnson (singer) =

English singer (1963–2020)

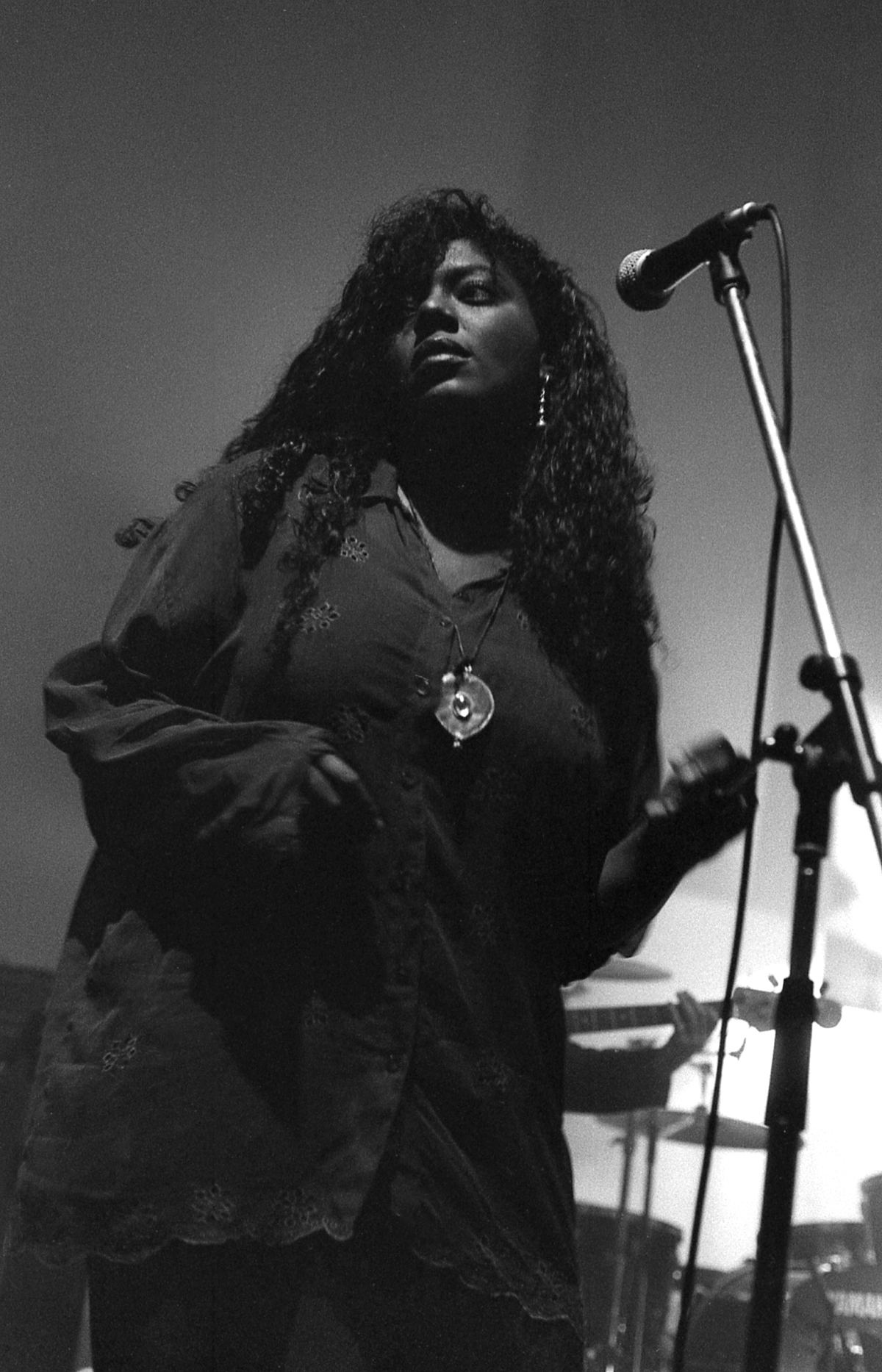
Denise Johnson performing with Primal Scream in 1991

Denise Johnson (31 July 1963 – 2020) was a British soul singer from Manchester.

She was a frequent session musician on records from bands such as Primal Scream and New Order. Her solo album Where Does It Go was released posthumously.
