= Club Citta =

Performance venue in Japan

- クラブチッタ
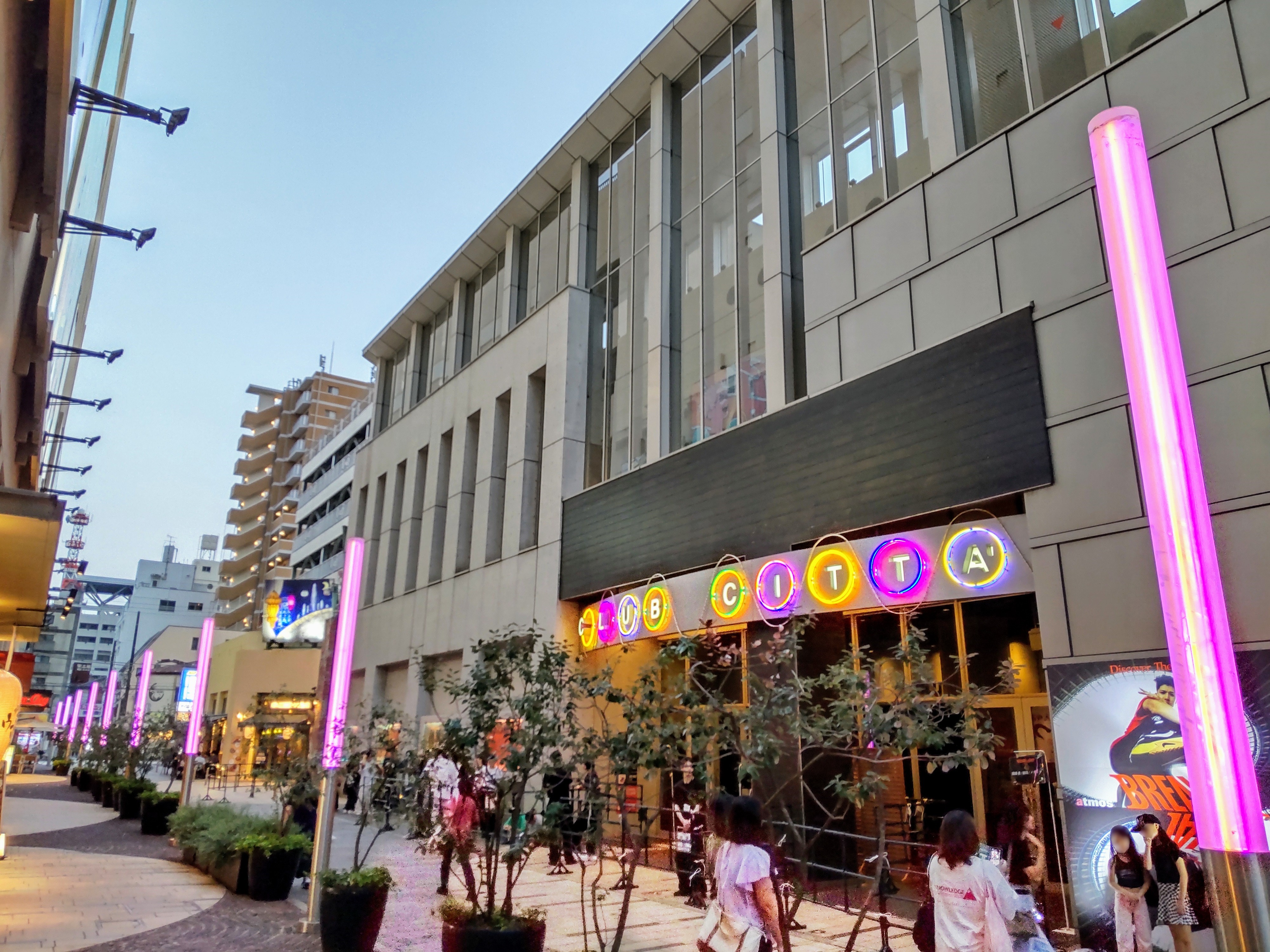
- Club Citta in 2024

General information
- Status: Open
- Location: Kawasaki, Kanagawa, Japan

Club Citta (stylized as CLUB CITTA' and originally known as CLUB CITTA' Kawasaki (Japanese: CLUB CITTA'川崎)) is a 1,300-capacity live music venue located in Kawasaki, Kanagawa, Japan. The club opened in 1988 and has hosted many famous artists, such as Alexandros, B'z, Beastie Boys, Black Sabbath, Blur, The Damned, Europe, The Exploited, The Gerogerigegege, Green Day, Jamiroquai, L.A. Guns, Lenny Kravitz, Les Rallizes Dénudés, Manic Street Preachers, Mano Negra, Nirvana, Oasis Radiohead, Rammstein, Ramones, Red Hot Chili Peppers, Wu-Tang Clan, X Japan and The Yellow Monkey. The venue is also home to CLUB CITT'A'TTIC, a bar on the second floor which holds its own events while functioning separately from Club Citta.

== History ==
Club Citta was opened on October 8, 1988. In 2000, it was closed due to redevelopment and underwent relocating and renovations. 2002 saw the opening of the new building, which was a block down from the original.
