= Sonic Flower Groove =

Studio album by Primal Scream
- Released: 5 October 1987
- Genre: Indie pop; folk rock; jangle pop; neo-psychedelia
- Length: 34:18
- Label: Elevation
- Producer: Mayo Thompson; Colin Fairley; Clive Langer

Primal Scream chronology
| Sonic Flower Groove (1987) | Primal Scream (1989) |

Singles from Sonic Flower Groove
- 1. "Gentle Tuesday" Released: June 1987; 2. "Imperial" Released: September 1987

Sonic Flower Groove is the debut studio album by the Scottish rock band Primal Scream, released on 5 October 1987 by Elevation Records. Mayo Thompson of Red Krayola was the producer of the album, after work with Stephen Street did not please the band. Musically, Sonic Flower Groove features psychedelic, Byrdsy jangle pop, being the only Primal Scream album to feature founding member Jim Beattie (credited as Jim Navajo).

The album sold well enough to reach number 62 on the UK Albums Chart, but performed poorly by major-label standards. The disappointment was a major reason for the original Primal Scream splitting up shortly after Sonic Flower Groove, leaving vocalist Bobby Gillespie and the guitar duo of Andrew Innes and Robert "Throb" Young to reorganize the band.

== Critical reception ==
Professional ratings
Review scores
| Source | Rating |
|---|---|
| AllMusic | 3/5 stars |
| The Encyclopedia of Popular Music | 2/5 stars |
| The Great Rock Discography | 5/10 |
| MusicHound Rock | 2/5 stars |
| NME | favourable |
| Record Mirror | 3/5 |
| The Rolling Stone Album Guide | 2/5 stars |
| Select | 4/5 |
| Sounds | 3/5 stars |

At the time of its release, critical reception was mixed. Underground called it "a real gem of a debut album" and "one that's sure to top all the polls come the end of the year", but others were less impressed. Melody Maker were impressed with "Gentle Tuesday" but said "the rest is not pop. It is dandelion fluff", stating that the album was "swamped with problems" with "no songs, just a dusty pile of dull leftovers".

A later AllMusic review called it "one goofy headscratcher of a release, the sound of a band that didn't quite know exactly what to do yet trying to record a big-budget (of sorts) debut album and ending up with little more than a pristine but dull photocopy of Turn! Turn! Turn!". In 2002, the Evening Times stated that it is "now regarded as a retro masterpiece".

== Track listing ==
All tracks are written by Bobby Gillespie and Jim Beattie, except where noted.

| No. | Title | Length |
|---|---|---|
| 1. | "Gentle Tuesday" | 3:49 |
| 2. | "Treasure Trip" | 3:15 |
| 3. | "May the Sun Shine Bright for You" | 2:41 |
| 4. | "Sonic Sister Love" | 2:36 |
| 5. | "Silent Spring" | 3:52 |
| 6. | "Imperial" | 3:38 |
| 7. | "Love You" | 4:45 |
| 8. | "Leaves" | 3:32 |
| 9. | "Aftermath" | 2:47 |
| 10. | "We Go Down Slowly Rising" | 3:23 |

Japanese edition bonus tracks
| No. | Title | Writer(s) | Length |
|---|---|---|---|
| 11. | "Black Star Carnival" | | 2:39 |
| 12. | "I'm Gonna Make You Mine" | William Carr, Carl D'Errico, Carole Bayer Sager | 2:12 |
| 13. | "Star Fruit Surf Rider" | | 1:58 |
| 14. | "So Sad About Us" | Pete Townshend | 4:17 |
| 15. | "Imperial" (demo) | | 3:43 |

== Personnel ==
Credits adapted from liner notes.

Primal Scream

- Bobby Gillespie – lead and backing vocals
- Jim Navajo – 12-string electric guitar
- Robert Young – bass guitar
- Andrew Innes – rhythm guitar

Additional personnel

- Dave Morgan – drums
- Gavin Skinner – drums
- Martin Duffy – piano
- Frank Sweeney – viola

Technical

- Pat Collier – engineering
- Helen Backhouse – design
- Andrew Catlin – cover photography

== Charts ==
| Chart | Peak position |
|---|---|
| UK Albums (OCC) | 62 |
