= Robert Young (musician) =

- Also known as: Throb
- Born: 19 November 1964; Glasgow, Scotland
- Died: 9 September 2014 (aged 49) Hove, East Sussex, England
- Genres: Alternative rock indie pop, psychedelic rock, acid house, IDM
- Instrument(s): Guitar, synths, samples, synth effects, bass
- Years active: 1984–2006
- Labels: Creation, Beggars Banquet, Sony
- Formerly of: Primal Scream

Robert Young (19 November 1964 – 9 September 2014) was a Scottish musician. He was a member of the alternative rock band Primal Scream from 1984 to 2006.

== Career ==
Young met Primal Scream singer Bobby Gillespie when they were both studying at King's Park Secondary School in Glasgow, and he joined the band in 1984. He performed on every Primal Scream album until his departure in 2006. He was originally the bass player. Primal Scream's debut album, Sonic Flower Groove, was released in 1987. After the album was released, guitarist Jim Beattie left the band and Young took over that role. Following 2006's Riot City Blues, Young left the band. According to Gillespie, this was to deal with "problems in his personal life".

Young also played bass on Felt's 1989 album Me and a Monkey on the Moon.

== Personal life ==
Young was married twice, divorced from his first wife Anita Laugharne. He had two sons, Brandon and Miles, with a former partner. At the time of his death, he was married to his second wife, Rachel.

== Death ==
Young was found dead in his flat in Hove, East Sussex on the afternoon of 9 September 2014. His death was announced two days later on 11 September. At the time of his death, Young was 49 years old. A police spokeswoman stated that his death was not being treated as suspicious.

Primal Scream's Gillespie and Andrew Innes wrote:

We have lost our comrade and brother Robert Young. A beautiful and deeply soulful man. He was an irreplaceable talent, much admired amongst his peers. In the words of Johnny Marr, "Throb with a gold top Les Paul – unbeatable". He was a true rock and roller. He walked the walk. He had "Heart & Soul" tattooed on his arm and I'm sure on his heart too. He once said to me, "When we go onstage, it's a war between us and the audience". He never let go of that attitude.

A cause of death has not been officially announced. However, Alan McGee, who was a manager for Primal Scream, has suggested that it was a result of drug or alcohol abuse:

He was the wildest of them all and he was the strongest so it's ironic that we all ended up sober and he fought his demons. Bobby [Gillespie] and me ended up sober, [Andrew] Innes is practically sober and even Tim Abbot is sober but unfortunately the strongest one didn’t end up sober and it’s ironic and heartbreaking that the strongest one physically, died at 49. He was a truly beautiful, gentle person. I guess it's that old cliche of live fast die young…
