= Andrew Innes =

Scottish musician

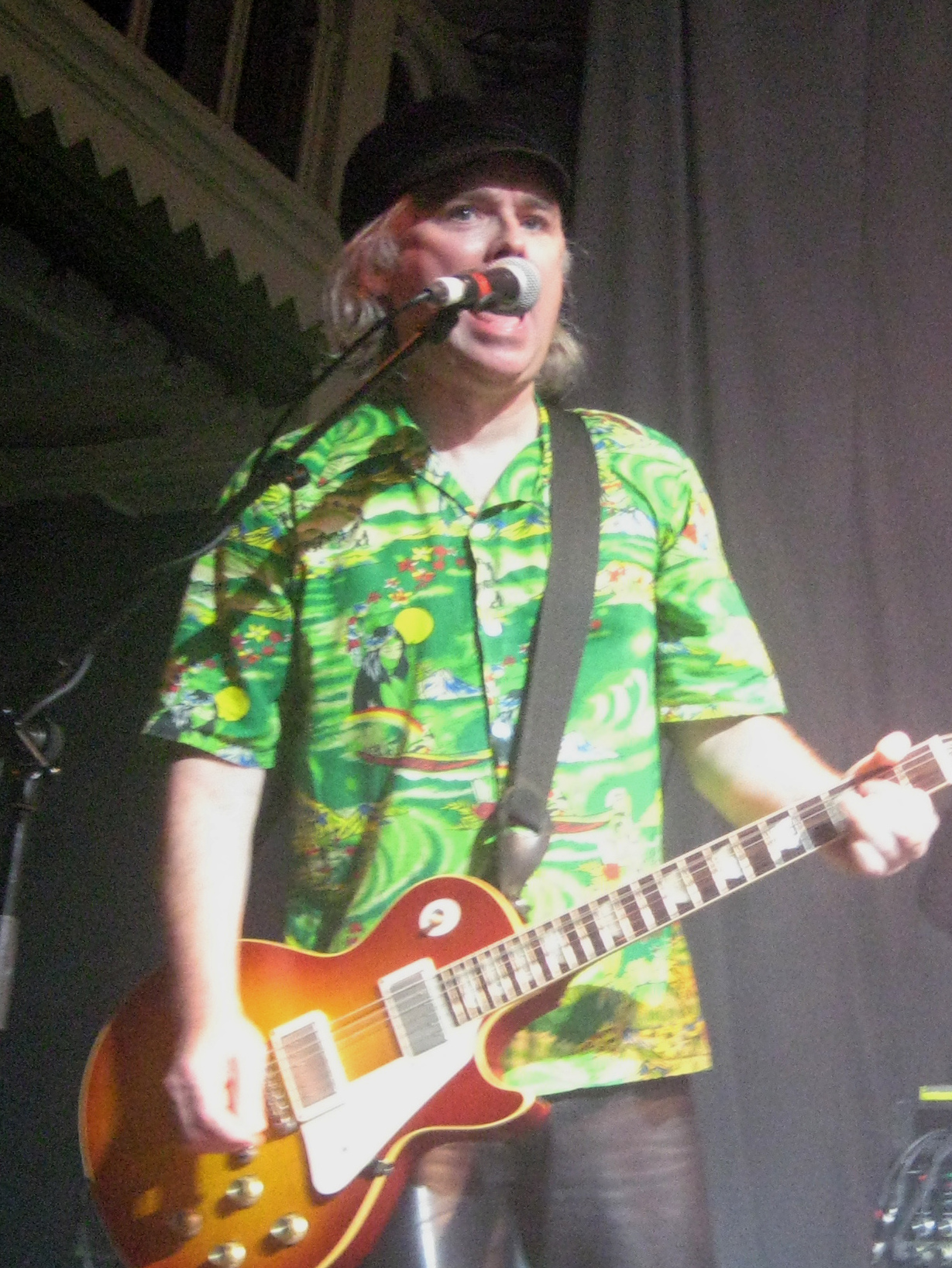
- Innes performing with Primal Scream in 2011

Background information
- Born: Andrew Collin Innes; 16 May 1962 (age 64); Glasgow, Scotland
- Genres: Alternative rock, electronic, hard rock
- Occupations: Musician, songwriter, producer
- Instruments: Guitar, keyboards, synthesizer, piano, bass guitar, mandolin, banjo, Appalachian dulcimer, vocals
- Years active: 1981–present
- Labels: Creation, Sony, B-Unique

Andrew Colin Innes (born 16 May 1962) is a Scottish musician, best known for being the guitarist in Scottish rock band Primal Scream.

== Biography ==
=== Early years ===
While in high school in 1978, Innes was the guitarist for a Glasgow punk band called The Drains. He met Alan McGee and Bobby Gillespie when they had joined the band. After the band's demise, Innes along with McGee briefly joined the band H_{2}O then relocated to London where they formed The Laughing Apple, a band of which recorded three singles in 1981 and 1982, two of which were released on Autonomy, and the third was put out on their own Essential record label.

=== Revolving Paint Dream ===
As Alan McGee went on to form Creation Records and the band, Biff Bang Pow!, Innes formed Revolving Paint Dream with his then-girlfriend Christine Wanless in 1983. Revolving Paint Dream released two singles and two albums between 1984 and 1989 on Creation. Innes and McGee both contributed to the recordings of each other's bands.

=== Primal Scream ===
While a member of Revolving Paint Dream, Innes joined his former bandmate, Bobby Gillespie, in Primal Scream as second guitarist in 1987. He first appeared on their Sonic Flower Groove LP, and with each subsequent recording, he has contributed songwriting and production work as well as guitar work and various instrumentation.
