= Dope =

Dope may refer to:

== Chemistry ==
=== Biochemistry ===
- Dope, a slang word for a euphoria-producing drug, particularly:
  - Cocaine
  - Cannabis (drug)
  - Heroin
  - Opioid
- DOPE, or 1,2-Dioleoyl-sn-glycero-3-phosphoethanolamine, a phospholipid
- Discrete optimized protein energy, a method of assessing homology models in protein structure prediction
- Dopamine, also colloquially called "dope", a neurotransmitter in the human brain that plays a key role in motivation, among other processes
- Dopant, an impurity added to a substance to alter its properties

=== Industrial substances ===
- Aircraft dope, a substance painted onto fabric-covered aircraft to tauten the skin
- Dope, a technical expression for the solution of polymers from which fibers are spun; see Wet processing engineering
- Peg dope, a substance used to coat the bearing surfaces of the tuning pegs of string instruments
- Pipe dope, a sealant applied to pipe threads to ensure a leakproof and pressure-tight seal

== Arts, entertainment, and media ==
=== Films ===
- Dope (1924 film), a 1924 Australian silent film
- Dope (2015 film), a 2015 film starring Shameik Moore, Zoë Kravitz and A$AP Rocky

=== Literature ===
- Dope (novel), a 1919 novel by Sax Rohmer
- DOPE (an acronym for Data on Personal Equipment, or Data on Previous Engagement), a book used with sniper equipment

=== Music ===
==== Groups ====
- Dope (band), an industrial metal band from the U.S. city of Villa Park, Illinois
  - Edsel Dope (born 1974), the lead singer and rhythm guitarist of the band Dope
- Dope D.O.D., a Dutch hip hop crew
- D.O.P.E., a Southern hip hop group; acronym for Destroying Other People's Egos

==== Songs ====
- "Dope" (Lady Gaga song), 2013
- "Dope" (Tyga song), 2013
- "Dope" (T.I. song), 2016
- "Dope" (GD & TOP song), 2016
- "She's Dope!", a 1990 song by Bell Biv DeVoe, originally titled "Dope!"
- "Dope", a song by BTS from the 2015 album The Most Beautiful Moment in Life, Pt. 1
- "Dope", a song by D'espairsRay from the 2010 album Monsters
- "Dope", a song by Fifth Harmony from the 2016 album 7/27
- "Dope!", a song by Royce da 5'9", featuring Loren W. Oden, from the 2016 album Layers
- "Dope", a song by Swedish singer Ängie, from the 2018 EP Suicidal Since 1995

=== Television ===
- Dope (TV series), a 2017-2019 Netflix documentary series revolving around drugs

== Other ==
- DOPE (Dartmouth Oversimplified Programming Experiment), a simple programming language that was a precursor to BASIC

== See also ==
- Dopey (disambiguation)
- Doping (disambiguation)
- Rope-a-dope (disambiguation)
- Dodecahedral prism
- Idiot
