= Doping =

Doping may refer to:

- Doping, adding a dopant to something
- Doping (semiconductor), intentionally introducing impurities into an extremely pure semiconductor to change its electrical properties
- Aircraft dope, a lacquer that is applied to fabric-covered aircraft
- Link doping, in search engine optimization

== Sports ==
- Doping in sport, the use of drugs or other methods to improve athletic performance
- Abortion doping, the rumoured practice of purposely inducing pregnancy for performance-enhancing benefits, then aborting
- Blood doping, boosting the number of red blood cells in the bloodstream
- Boosting (doping), a method of inducing autonomic dysreflexia
- Gene doping, the hypothetical non-therapeutic use of gene therapy by athletes
- Stem cell doping, the theoratical practice of injecting stem cells into the blood for increased athletic performance
- Technology doping, the use of certain equipment to gain an advantage over competition
- Doping in China, an alleged doping operation performed by the People's Republic of China
- Doping in Russia, the pattern of Russian athletes doping in the Olympic Games

== See also ==
- DOP (disambiguation)
- Dope (disambiguation)
- Dopey (disambiguation)
- Dopping (disambiguation)
