= 2013 (disambiguation) =

2013 was a common year starting on Tuesday of the Gregorian calendar.

2013 may also refer to:

== Albums ==
- 2013, a 2010 album by Ya Ho Wha 13
- Dara 2013, a 2013 album by Dara Bubamara

== Songs ==
- "2013" (song), by Primal Scream, 2013
- "2013", a song by Ängie from Suicidal Since 1995
- "2013", a song by the Arctic Monkeys from AM
- "2013", a song by DJ Muggs and Ill Bill from Kill Devil Hills
- "2013", a song by Françoiz Breut
- "2013", a song written by Isabelle Antena
- "2013", a song by Lee Bannon
- "2013", a song by Louis Cheung
- "2013", a song by m-flo from Expo Bōei Robot Gran Sonik
- "2013", a song by Royal-T
