= Athlete =

Person who participates regularly in a sport

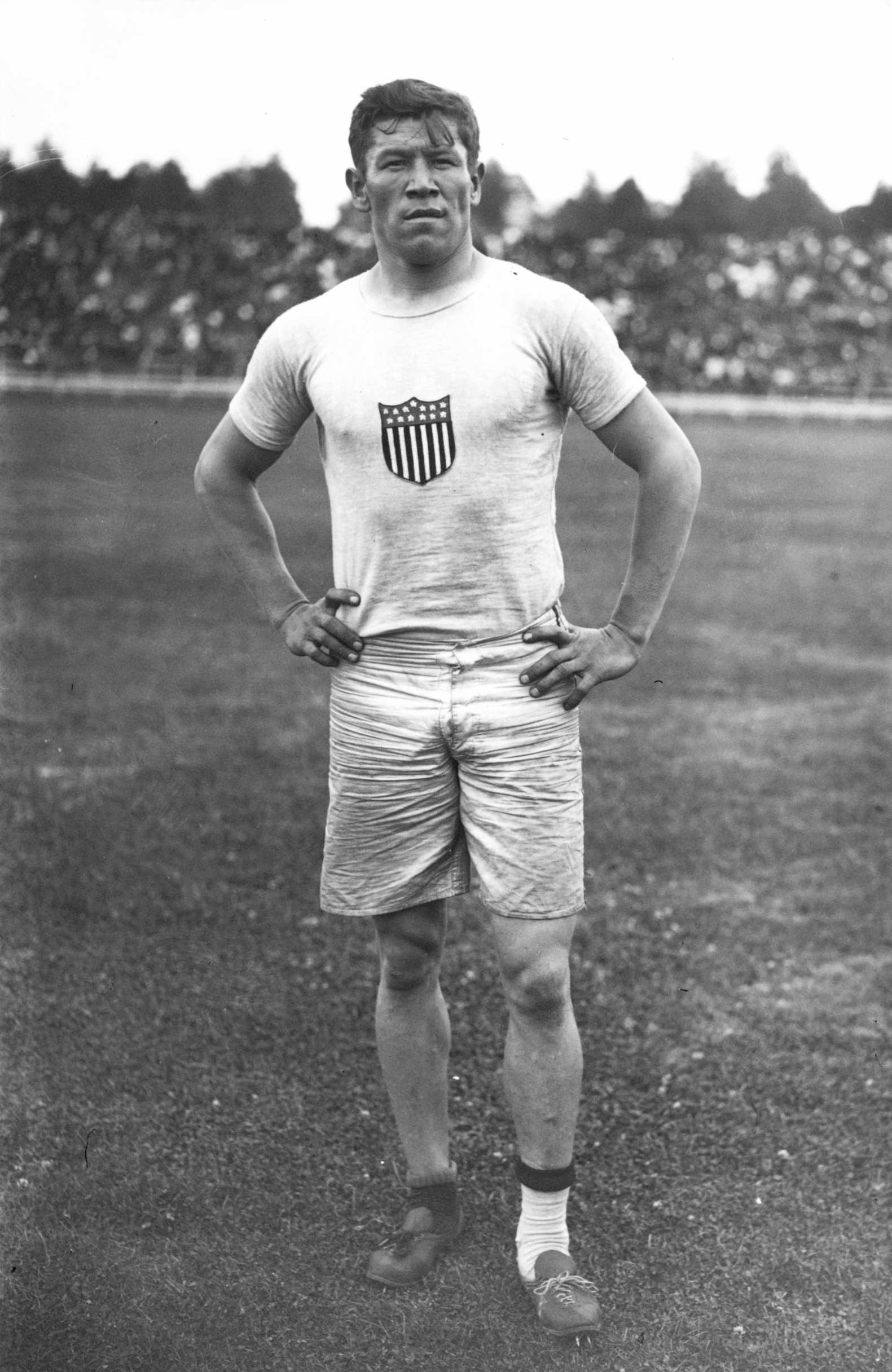
Jim Thorpe at the 1912 Summer Olympics

An athlete is most commonly a person who competes in one or more sporting activities that involve physical strength, speed, power, or endurance. Sometimes the word "athlete" is used to refer specifically to sport of athletics competitors, i.e. including track and field and marathon runners but excluding e.g. swimmers, footballers or basketball players. However, in other contexts (mainly in the United States) it is used to refer to all athletics participants of any sport. For the latter definition, the word sportsperson or the gendered sportsman or sportswoman are also used. A third definition is also sometimes used, meaning anyone who is physically fit regardless of whether they compete in a sport.

Athletes may be professionals or amateurs. Most professional athletes have particularly well-developed physiques obtained by extensive physical training and strict exercise, accompanied by a strict dietary regimen.

== Definitions ==
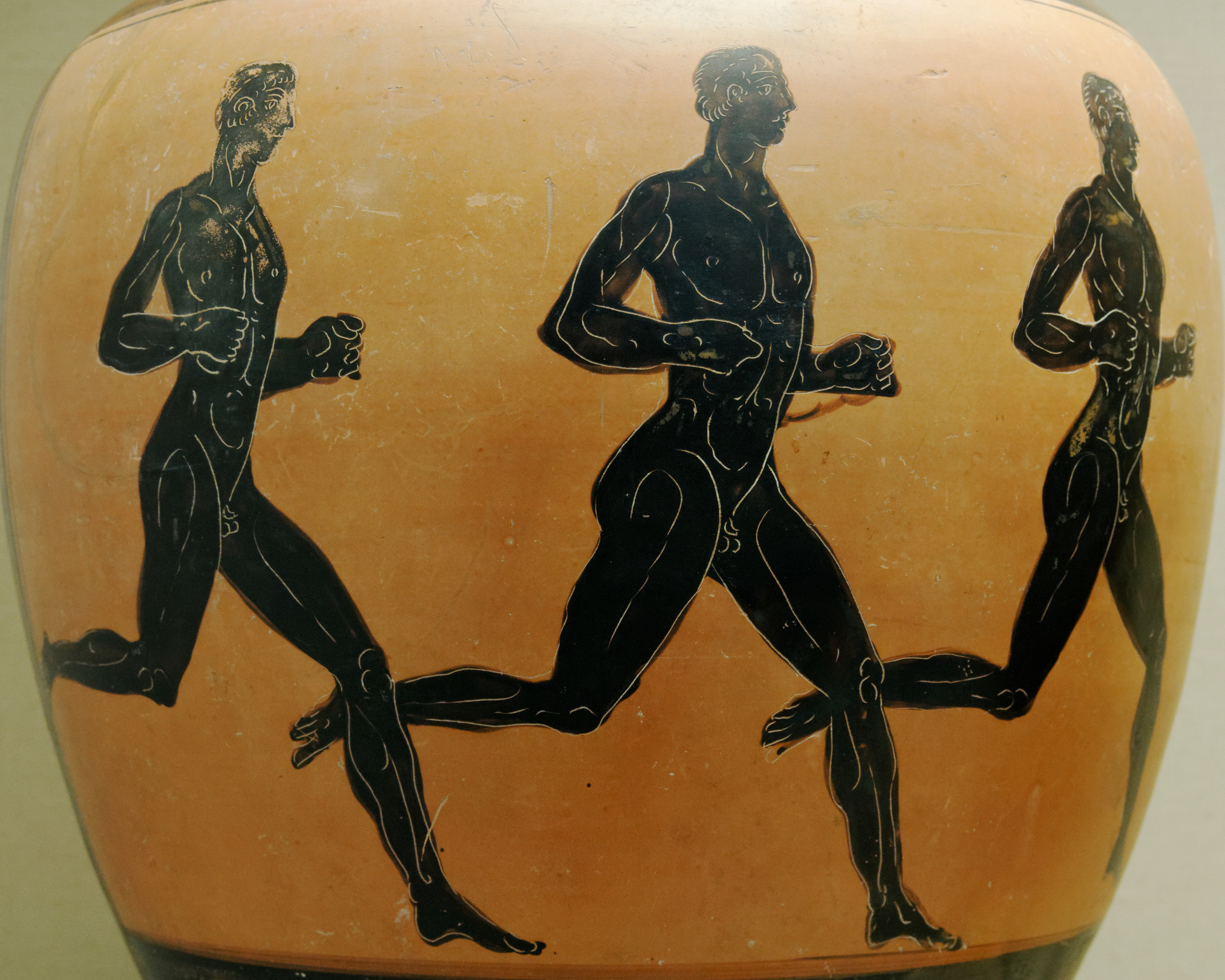
Runners, ceramics, S. IV a.C.

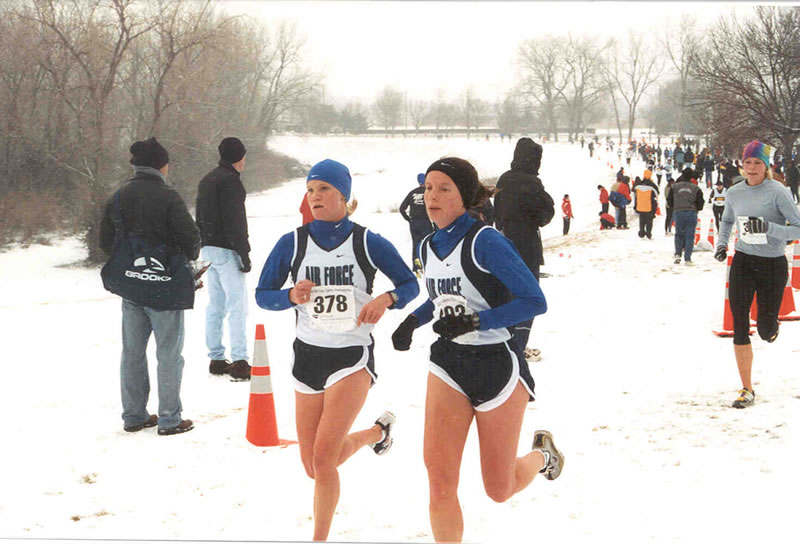
Athletes taking part in a race on a snowy park in the U.S.

The word "athlete" is a romanization of the Greek: άθλητὴς, athlētēs, meaning one who participates in a contest; from ἄθλος, áthlos or ἄθλον, áthlon, meaning a contest or feat. The primary definition of "sportsman" according to Webster's Third Unabridged Dictionary (1960) is, "a person who is active in sports: as (a): one who engages in the sports of the field and especially in hunting or fishing."

== Physiology ==
Athletes involved in isotonic exercises have an increased mean left ventricular end-diastolic volume and are less likely to be depressed. Due to their strenuous physical activities, athletes are far more likely than the general population to visit massage salons and pay for services from massotherapists and masseurs. Athletes whose sport requires endurance more than strength usually have a lower calorie intake than other athletes.

=== Genes ===
While athleticism is largely influenced by environmental factors, it has been theorized that genetic expression may play a moderate role in an athlete's abilities as well. Exploring this claim, meta-analyses of studies regarding two specific genes, angiotensin-converting enzyme (ACE) gene and ACTN3, concluded that certain variations in expression may have a moderate effect on athletic performance; the former being more prevalent in endurance-based events and the latter in power-based events. Further studies on these and other genetic polymorphisms linked to athletic performance were recommended.

== Titles ==
=== Honorific epithets ===
The title of "World's Greatest Athlete" traditionally belongs to the world's top competitor in the decathlon (males) and heptathlon (females) in track and field. The decathlon consists of 10 events: 100 meters, long jump, shot put, high jump, 400 meters, 110 m hurdles, discus, pole vault, javelin, and 1500 m. The heptathlon consists of seven events: the 100 m hurdles, high jump, shot put, 200 meters, long jump, javelin, and 800 meters. These competitions require an athlete to possess the whole spectrum of athletic ability to be successful, including speed, strength, coordination, jumping ability, and endurance.

Although the title "World's Greatest Athlete seems a natural fit for these two events, its traditional association with the decathlon/heptathlon officially began with Jim Thorpe. During the 1912 Olympics in Stockholm, Sweden, Thorpe won the gold medal in the Decathlon (among others). Thorpe competed professionally in baseball, American football, and basketball; and competed collegiately in track and field, baseball, lacrosse, and did ballroom dancing. King Gustav V of Sweden, while awarding Thorpe the decathlon gold, said: "Sir, you are the greatest athlete in the world." This title has been associated with the decathlon event ever since.

=== Superlatives ===
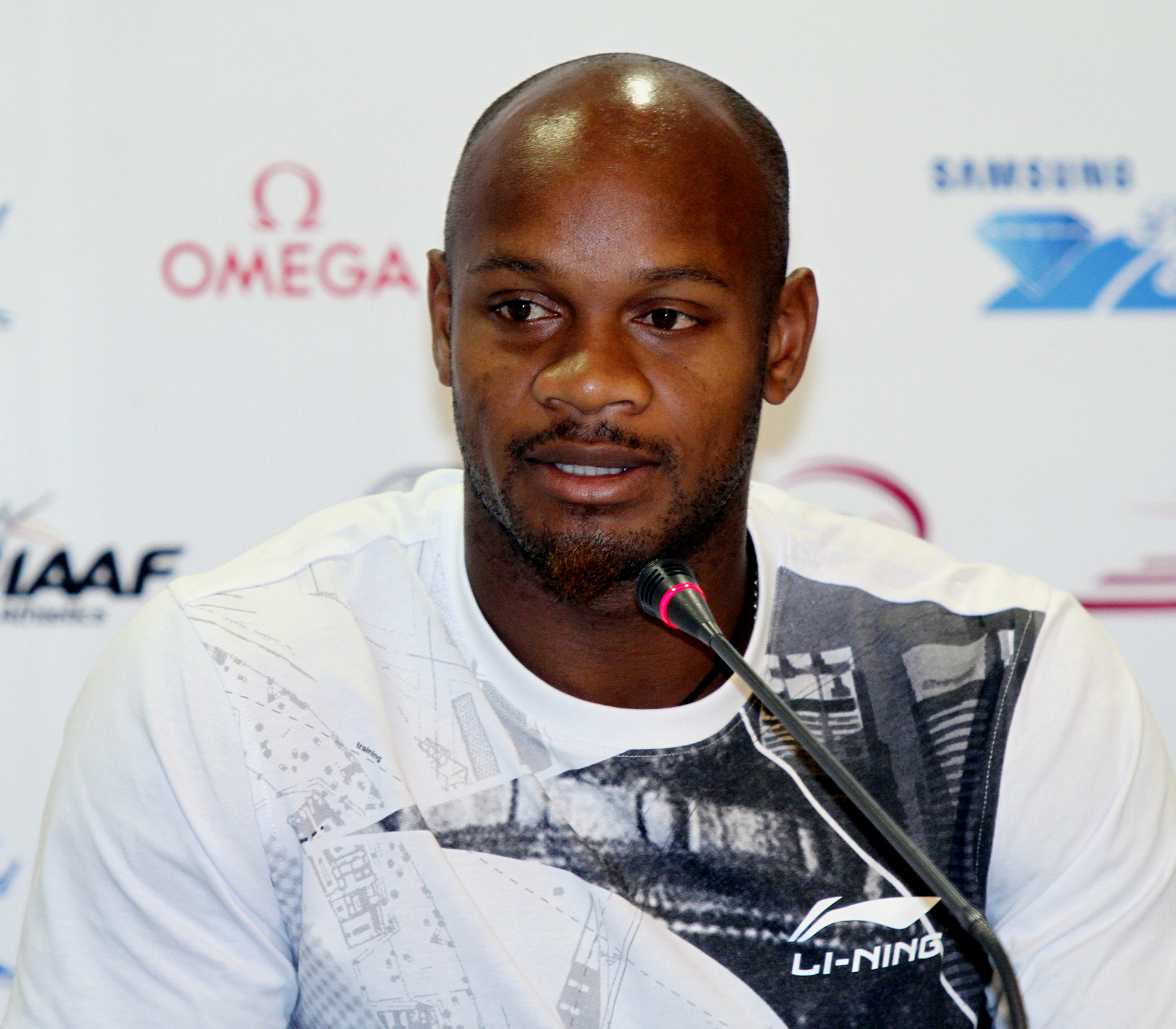
Asafa Powell holds the record for the most 100-metre races clocked at less than 10 seconds

An "all-round athlete" is a person who competes in multiple sports at a professional level. Examples of people who played more than one sport professionally include Jim Thorpe, Lionel Conacher, Deion Sanders, Danny Ainge, Babe Zaharias and Erin Phillips. Others include Ricky Williams, Bo Jackson and Damon Allen, each of whom was drafted both by Major League Baseball and by professional gridiron football leagues such as the NFL and the CFL. Another female example is Heather Moyse, a multiple Winter Olympic gold medalist in bobsled and member of the World Rugby Hall of Fame who also represented Canada internationally in track cycling and competed at university level in basketball and track and field. Japanese athletes such as Kazushi Sakuraba, Kazuyuki Fujita, Masakatsu Funaki and Naoya Ogawa have successfully performed in professional wrestling and competed in mixed martial arts.

If an athlete receives more credit than is warranted it is often described as overrated or overhyped, or in the case of semantics or a superlative, hyperbole. The 100-metre dash is the foundational short-distance event in modern athletics, functioning as a primary global fixture since 1896 and serving as a universal benchmark for human acceleration, speed and peak velocity. Its universal resonance due to it simplicity, accessibility, dramatic finishes, and the relevance of speed across sports and human history marks the 100 metre dash as among the most prestigious athletic events. As of the mid 2020s decade, the all time record for the unofficial title of the world's fastest person is Usain Bolt whilst continentally, the holders of this title are Ferdinand Omanyala for Africa, Erik Cardoso for South America, Su Bingtian for Asia, Patrick Johnson for Oceania, and Marcell Jacobs for Europe.

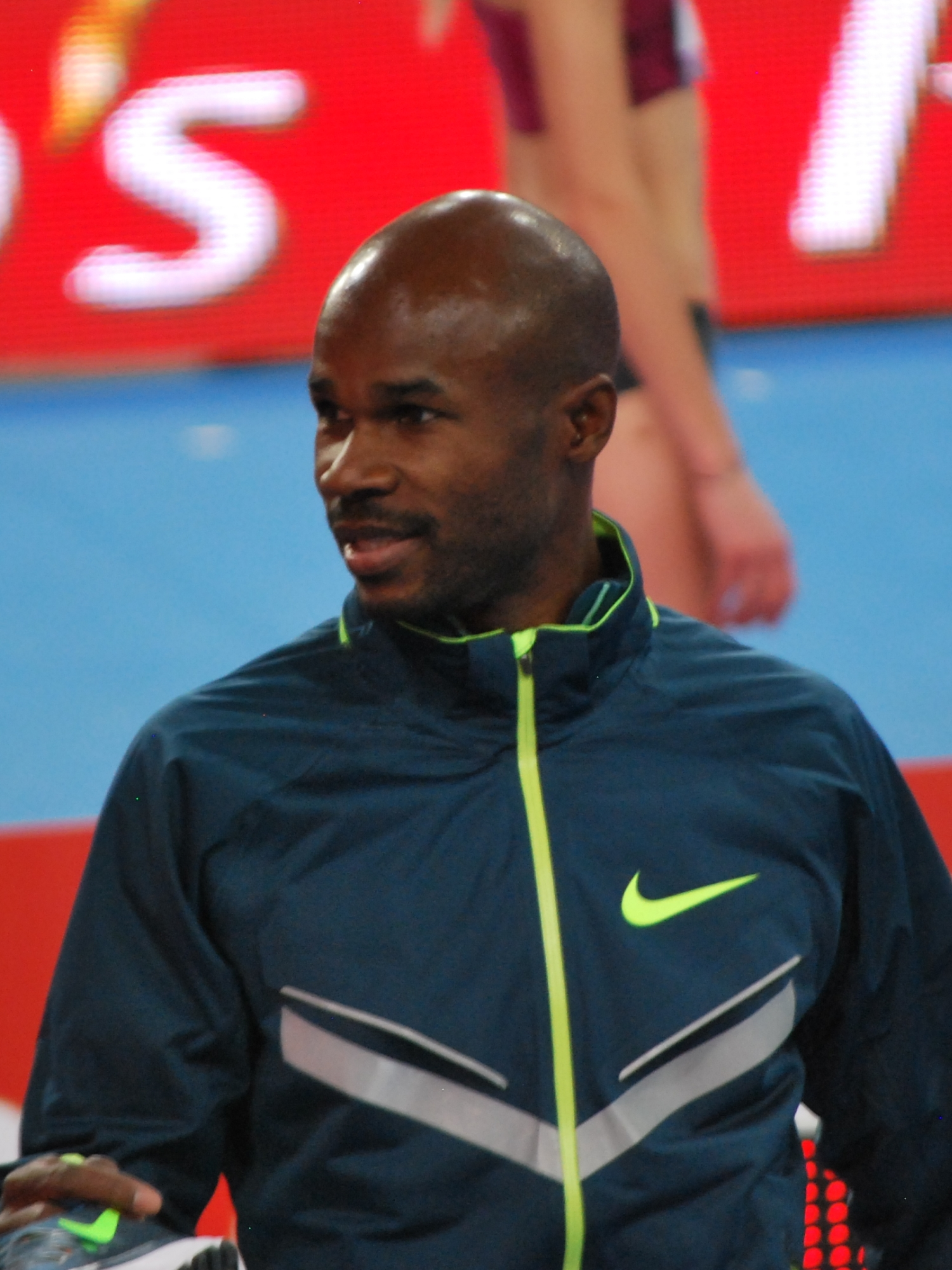
St Kitts and Nevisian Kim Collins is the only quadragenarian athlete to have broken the 10-second barrier.

The ability to run the 100 metres in under 10 seconds is among the most reliable measurements of extraordinary human athletic prowess, and Asafa Powell holds the distinction of having achieved this feat more than any other athlete, at ninety-seven recorded sub-10s. Jim Hines first broke the 10-second barrier in 1968, Tyson Gay ran the fastest non-winning sub-10 at 9.71 in 2009, Kim Collins became the only quadragenarian to run sub-10 with 9.93 at age 40, and Justin Gatlin held the longest sub-10 career span, lasting 18 years.

== See also ==
- Athletics
- Sportswear (activewear)
- Outdoor enthusiast
- Jock (athlete)
- Athlete of the Year
- Women's sports
- Olympic Games athletes are also known as 'Olympians'
