= Parul Ghosh =

Indian singer

- Born: Parul Biswas; 1915; Barisal, Bengal Presidency, British India (now in Bangladesh)
- Died: 13 August 1977; Malad, Mumbai, India
- Occupation: Playback singer
- Spouse: Pannalal Ghosh
- Relatives: Anil Biswas (brother)

Parul Ghosh (née Biswas; 1915–13 August 1977) was an Indian playback singer.

== Career ==
Ghosh sang in Hindi and Bengali movies from 1935 to 1951. Hailing from Barisal (now in Bangladesh), she was introduced to playback singing by her brother Anil Biswas. She was the first singer who sang as a playback singer alongwith Suprabha Sarkar and Hiramati Dua in 1935 Hindi movie Dhoop Chhaon under Music Directors R C Boral and Pankaj Mullick. Other major films in which she featured include Jwar Bhata, Milan, Hamaari Baat and Namaste. In her early career she was associated with New Theatres, Kolkata.

== Personal life and death ==
Ghosh was married to the flautist Pannalal Ghosh in 1924. Ghosh died on 13 August 1977 in Malad, Mumbai.
