= Dopey =

Dopey may refer to:

- Dopey (Disney), a character in Snow White and the Seven Dwarfs and related media
- "Dopey" (Land of the Lost), an episode of Land of the Lost
- Dopey (podcast), a podcast about drug addiction
- "Dopey" Benny Fein, a gang leader in the Labor Slugger Wars in New York City in the early 20th century

== See also ==
- Dope (disambiguation)
- Doping (disambiguation)
