= Dank Recovery =

Online account posting memes about substance use disorders

Dank Recovery is the username of a social media account known for its aggregation of online content and Internet memes about substance use disorders. Dank Recovery has over 700,000 Facebook followers, and over 100,00 Instagram followers. It was created by Moose (born Timothy Kavanagh), a recovering heroin addict, in 2015 as an outlet for his own recovery.

== Operations ==
In addition to Kavanagh, Dank Recovery has had a number of editors over the years. Past editors include; Isaac, Jake, Jenny and Noah. Dank Recovery receives content submissions from all over the world. Dank Recovery is also known for using their presence on social media to help people get treatment for substance use disorders

== Other media ==
Dank Recovery launched The Dank Recovery Podcast in 2025. Kavanagh was also a guest on Dopey (podcast) to talk about Dank Recovery's history, as well as his personal stories in addiction and creating recovery based humor.
