= Dop (surname) =

Dop is a surname. Notable people with the name include:

- Gary Dop (born 1977), American poet
- Jean Dop (1924–2003), French rugby league footballer
- Mai Dop (born 1968), Papua New Guinean politician
- Paul Louis Amans Dop (1876–1954), French botanist

== See also ==
- DOP (disambiguation)
- Dopp (disambiguation)
