= Each Other =

Each Other may refer to:

- Each Other, a 2016 album by Aidan Knight
- Each Other, a 2019 EP by Ängie
- "Each Other", a song on the 2011 album Here I Am by Kelly Rowland
- Reciprocal constructions (linguistics)
