= Gene doping =

Hypothetical non-therapeutic use of gene therapy by athletes

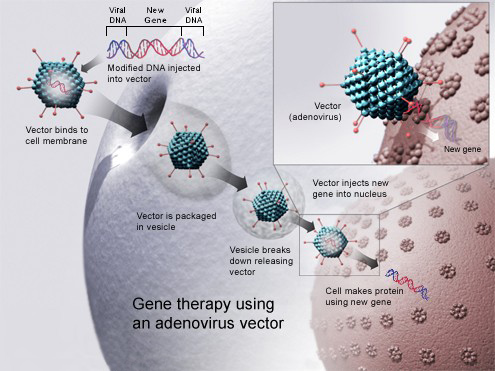
gene therapy

Gene doping is the hypothetical non-therapeutic use of gene therapy by athletes in order to improve their performance in those sporting events which prohibit such applications of genetic modification technology, and for reasons other than the treatment of disease. As of 2024, there is no evidence that gene doping has been used for athletic performance-enhancement in any sporting events. Gene doping would involve the use of gene transfer to increase or decrease gene expression and protein biosynthesis of a specific human protein; this could be done by directly injecting the gene carrier into the person, or by taking cells from the person, transfecting the cells, and administering the cells back to the person.

The historical development of interest in gene doping by athletes and concern about the risks of gene doping and how to detect it moved in parallel with the development of the field of gene therapy, especially with the publication in 1998 of work on a transgenic mouse overexpressing insulin-like growth factor 1 that was much stronger than normal mice, even in old age, preclinical studies published in 2002 of a way to deliver erythropoietin (EPO) via gene therapy, and publication in 2004 of the creation of a "marathon mouse" with much greater endurance than normal mice, created by delivering the gene expressing PPAR gamma to the mice. The scientists generating these publications were all contacted directly by athletes and coaches seeking access to the technology. The public became aware of that activity in 2006 when such efforts were part of the evidence presented in the trial of a German coach.

Scientists themselves, as well as bodies including the World Anti-Doping Agency (WADA), the International Olympic Committee, and the American Association for the Advancement of Science, started discussing the risk of gene doping in 2001, and by 2003 WADA had added gene doping to the list of banned doping practices, and shortly thereafter began funding research on methods to detect gene doping.

Genetic enhancement includes manipulation of genes or gene transfer by healthy athletes for the purpose of physically improving their performance. Genetic enhancement includes gene doping and has potential for abuse among athletes, all while opening the door to political and ethical controversy.

There are many negative effects of gene doping. The main technique used in gene doping is delivering genes via a vector. One vector is a virus which inserts the gene into the body and directs it toward the desired area(s). There are many risks using a virus as the carriers. The body may see the virus as an intrusion and attack it, which can cause harm to the individual. Additionally, there is always a risk of infection from inserting foreign elements into the body. Another risk is that of the virus causing errors in the genes which could lead to cancer, diseases, or possibly death, a process called insertional mutagenesis. The viruses may also attack healthy cells. Another vector is one's own stem cells, but this also poses a risk of infection.

== History of gene doping ==
The history of concern about the potential for gene doping follows the history of gene therapy, the medical use of genes to treat diseases, which was first clinically tested in the 1990s. Interest by the athletic community was especially spurred by the creation in a university lab of a "mighty mouse", created by administering a virus carrying the gene expressing insulin-like growth factor 1 to mice; the mice were stronger and remained strong even as they aged, without exercise. The lab had been seeking treatments for muscle wasting diseases, but when their work was made public, the lab was inundated with calls from athletes seeking the treatment, with one coach offering his whole team. The scientist told The New York Times in 2007: "I was quite surprised, I must admit. People would try to entice me, saying things like, 'It'll help advance your research.' Some offered to pay me." He also told the Times that every time similar research is published he gets calls and that he explains that, even should the treatment became ready for use in people, which would take years, there would be serious risks, including death; he also said that even after he explains this, the athletes still want it.

In 1999, the field of gene therapy was set back when Jesse Gelsinger died in a gene therapy clinical trial, suffering a massive inflammatory reaction to the drug. This led regulatory authorities in the US and Europe to increase safety requirements in clinical trials even beyond the initial restrictions that had been put in place at the beginning of the biotechnology era to deal with the risks of recombinant DNA.

In June 2001, Theodore Friedmann, one of the pioneers of gene therapy, and Johann Olav Koss, an Olympic gold medallist in speed skating, published a paper that was the first public warning about gene doping. Also in June 2001, a Gene Therapy Working Group, convened by the Medical Commission of the International Olympic Committee noted that "we are aware that there is the potential for abuse of gene therapy medicines and we shall begin to establish procedures and state-of-the-art testing methods for identifying athletes who might misuse such technology".

Research was published in 2002 about a preclinical gene therapy called Repoxygen, which delivered the gene encoding erythropoietin (EPO) as a potential treatment for anemia. The scientists from that company also received calls from athletes and coaches. In that same year the World Anti-Doping Agency held its first meeting to discuss the risk of gene doping, and the US President's Council on Bioethics discussed gene doping in the context of human enhancement at several sessions.

In 2003, the field of gene therapy took a step forward and a step back; first gene therapy drug was approved, Gendicine, which was approved in China for the treatment of certain cancers, but children in France who had seemingly been effectively treated with gene therapy for severe combined immunodeficiency (non-human) began developing leukemia. In 2003 the BALCO scandal became public, in which chemists, trainers and athletes conspired to evade doping controls with new and undetectable doping substances. In 2003 the World Doping Agency proactively added gene doping to the list of banned doping practices. Also in 2003, a symposium convened by the American Association for the Advancement of Science focused on the issue.

Research published in 2004 showed that mice given gene therapy coding for a protein called PPAR gamma had about double the endurance of untreated mice and were dubbed "marathon mice"; those scientists received calls from athletes and coaches. Also in 2004 the World Anti-Doping Agency began to fund research to detect gene doping, and formed a permanent expert panel to advise it on risks and to guide the funding.

In 2006 interest from athletes in gene doping received widespread media coverage due its mention during the trial of a German coach who was accused and found guilty of giving his athletes performance enhancing drugs without their knowledge; an email in which the coach attempted to obtain Repoxygen was read in open court by a prosecutor. This was the first public disclosure that athletes were interested in gene doping.

In 2011 the second gene therapy drug was approved; Neovasculgen, which delivers the gene encoding VEGF, was approved in Russia to treat peripheral artery disease.

In 2012 Glybera, a treatment for a rare inherited disorder, became the first treatment to be approved for clinical use in either Europe or the United States.

As the field of gene therapy has developed, the risk of gene doping becoming a reality has increased with it.

== Agents used in gene doping ==
There are numerous genes of interest as agents for gene doping. They include erythropoietin, insulin-like growth factor 1, human growth hormone, myostatin, vascular endothelial growth factor, fibroblast growth factor, endorphin, enkephalin and alpha-actinin-3.

The risks of gene doping would be similar to those of gene therapy: immune reaction to the native protein leading to the equivalent of a genetic disease, massive inflammatory response, cancer, and death, and in all cases, these risks would be undertaken for short-term gain as opposed to treating a serious disease.

=== Alpha-actinin-3 ===
Alpha-actinin-3 is found only in skeletal muscle in humans, and has been identified in several genetic studies as having a different polymorphism in world-class athletes compared with normal people. One form that causes the gene to make more protein is found in sprinters and is related to increased power; another form that causes the gene to make less protein is found in endurance athletes. Gene doping agents could be designed with either polymorphism, or for endurance athletes, some DNA construct that interfered with expression like a small interfering RNA.

=== Myostatin ===
Myostatin is a protein responsible for inhibiting muscle differentiation and growth. Removing the myostatin gene or otherwise limiting its expression leads to an increase in muscle size and power. This has been demonstrated in knockout mice lacking the gene that were dubbed "Schwarzenegger mice". Humans born with defective genes can also serve as "knockout models"; a German boy with a mutation in both copies of the myostatin gene was born with well-developed muscles. The advanced muscle growth continued after birth, and the boy could lift weights of 3 kg at the age of 4. In work published in 2009, scientists administered follistatin via gene therapy to the quadriceps of non-human primates, resulting in local muscle growth similar to the mice.

=== Erythropoietin (EPO) ===
Erythropoietin is a glycoprotein that acts as a hormone, controlling red blood cell production. Athletes have injected the EPO protein as a performance-enhancing substance for many years (blood doping). When the additional EPO increases the production of red blood cells in circulation, this increases the amount of oxygen available to muscle, enhancing an athlete's endurance. Recent studies suggest it may be possible to introduce another EPO gene into an animal in order to increase EPO production endogenously. EPO genes have been successfully inserted into mice and monkeys, and were found to increase hematocrits by as much as 80 percent in those animals. However, the endogenous and transgene derived EPO elicited autoimmune responses in some animals in the form of severe anemia.

=== Insulin-like growth factor 1 ===
Insulin-like growth factor 1 is a protein involved in the mediation of the growth hormone. Administration of IGF-1 to mice has resulted in more muscle growth and quicker muscle and nerve regeneration. If athletes were to use this the sustained production of IGF-1 could cause heart disease and cancer. Insulin-like growth factor 1 can lead to quicker muscle growth. Fast muscle growth that happens too quickly can cause injuries in itself. Injuries such as muscle tears, tendonitis, and inflammation.

=== Others ===
Modulating the levels of proteins that affect psychology are also potential goals for gene doping; for example pain perception depends on endorphins and enkephalins, response to stress depends on BDNF, and an increase in synthesis of monamines could improve the mood of athletes. Preproenkephalin has been administered via gene therapy using a replication-deficient herpes simplex virus, which targets nerves, to mice with results good enough to justify a Phase I clinical trial in people with terminal cancer with uncontrolled pain. Adopting that approach for athletes would be problematic since the pain deadening would likely be permanent.

VEGF has been tested in clinical trials to increase blood flow and has been considered as a potential gene doping agent; however long term follow up of the clinical trial subjects showed poor results. The same is true of fibroblast growth factor. Glucagon-like peptide-1 increases the amount of glucose in the liver and has been administered via gene therapy to the livers of mouse models of diabetes and was shown to increase gluconeogenesis' for athletes this would make more energy available and reduce the buildup of lactic acid.

== Detection ==
The World Anti-Doping Agency (WADA) is the main regulatory organization looking into the issue of the detection of gene doping. Both direct and indirect testing methods are being researched by the organization. Directly detecting the use of gene therapy usually requires the discovery of recombinant proteins or gene insertion vectors, while most indirect methods involve examining the athlete in an attempt to detect bodily changes or structural differences between endogenous and recombinant proteins.

Indirect methods are by nature more subjective, as it becomes very difficult to determine which anomalies are proof of gene doping, and which are simply natural, though unusual, biological properties. For example, Eero Mäntyranta, an Olympic cross country skier, had a mutation which made his body produce abnormally high amounts of red blood cells. It would be very difficult to determine whether or not Mäntyranta's red blood cell levels were due to an innate genetic advantage, or an artificial one.

In the last few years, scientists have come up with new testing methods that can look for several gene changes at the same time. One example is multiplex PCR-based detection system that can check for many possible gene doping targets all at once, which makes testing faster and cheaper.

=== First generation of gene doping detecting methods ===
Gene doping testing began in 2004 when WADA officially banned the practice and started searching for ways to detect added genes.The first testing method used PCR, a technique that looks for specific DNA sequences. A small blood sample is enough because tiny amounts of the added gene can leak into the bloodstream. These inserted genes look different from normal human DNA because they usually come in a form called cDNA, which has had all the “extra” non-coding parts (introns) removed. This leaves only the important coding segments (exons). Therefore, PCR can target these exon-exon junctions as a unique sequence that is not present in gDNA

=== Real time PCR ===
PCR has many applications in molecular biology field including DNA analysis. The main purpose of PCR is to amplify and double the DNA sequences exponentially.

In gene doping detection, If the sequence started to amplify producing an exponential graph, then the test is positive and indicates the presence of the gene in the sample obtained from that person. But if the sequence didn't amplify and a linear graph was produced, then the test is said to be negative and the targeted DNA sequence was not present in that person's sample.

=== Next generation sequencing ===
With the limitation of the first-generation detection methods, it was important to develop a new method that overcomes the previous failures with a high accuracy and can detect the manipulation in DNA sequences that could avoid being detected by PCR methods.

Next generation sequencing is the rapid way of looking at DNA and RNA, where they look at the sequence and see if anything has been enhanced or inhibited. NGS allows a large amount of data to be generated in a short amount of time. The solution was using Next Generation Sequencing (NGS) method that can determine the nucleotide orders of the whole genome or targets the exon-exon junctions in transgene and compare it with reference gene sequence. This method is fast, accurate, and increasingly affordable. It has enabled scientific advances that were previously impossible, including whole-genome sequencing.

DNA sequencing was established in the 1970s with the two-dimensional chromatography and kept improving until 2001 with the completion of human genome project which costed about three billion dollars and required 15 years to finish sequencing the whole genome. Advances in sequencing technology have reduced whole-genome sequencing (WGS) to a one-day process costing about a thousand dollars. Emerging technologies may soon lower the cost further to approximately one hundred dollars.

There are many NGS techniques that are used in DNA sequencing but the most used method is the one done by illumina

== Research ==
A 2016 review found that about 120 DNA polymorphisms had been identified in the literature related to some aspect of athletic performance, 77 related to endurance and 43 related to power. 11 had been replicated in three or more studies and six were identified in genome-wide association studies, but 29 had not been replicated in at least one study.

The 11 replicated markers were:

Endurance

- ACE Alu I/D (rs4646994) (Called ACE I)
- ACTN3 577X
- PPARA rs4253778 G,
- PPARGC1A Gly482;

power/strength markers

- ACE Alu I/D (rs4646994) (called ACE D)
- ACTN3 Arg577
- AMPD1 Gln12
- HIF1A 582Ser
- MTHFR rs1801131 C
- NOS3 rs2070744 T
- PPARG 12Ala

The six GWAS markers were:

- CREM rs1531550 A,
- DMD rs939787 T
- GALNT13 rs10196189 G
- NFIA-AS1 rs1572312 C,
- RBFOX1 rs7191721 G
- TSHR rs7144481 C

== Ethics of gene doping ==
The World Anti-Doping Agency (WADA) determined that any non-therapeutic form of genetic manipulation for enhancement of athletic performance is banned under its code. There are guidelines that determine whether a technology should be prohibited in sport: if two of the following three criteria are met—harmful to health, performance enhancing, or against the ‘spirit of sport’—then the technology is banned.

Kayser et al. argue that gene doping could level the playing field if all athletes receive equal access. Critics claim that any therapeutic intervention for non-therapeutic/enhancement purposes compromises the ethical foundations of medicine and sports.

The high risks associated with gene therapy can be outweighed by the potential of saving the lives of individuals with diseases: according to Alain Fischer, who was involved in clinical trials of gene therapy in children with severe combined immunodeficiency, "Only people who are dying would have reasonable grounds for using it. Using gene therapy for doping is ethically unacceptable and scientifically stupid." As seen with past cases, including the steroid tetrahydrogestrinone (THG), athletes may choose to incorporate risky genetic technologies into their training regimes.

The mainstream perspective is that gene doping is dangerous and unethical, as is any application of a therapeutic intervention for non-therapeutic or enhancing purposes, and that it compromises the ethical foundation of medicine and the spirit of sport. Others, who support human enhancement on broader grounds, or who see a false dichotomy between "natural" and "artificial" or a denial of the role of technology in improving athletic performance, do not oppose or support gene doping.

== See also ==
- Doping in sport
- Human genetic enhancement
- Stem cell doping
