= Dopping (disambiguation) =

Dopping is a jewelry glue used to dop gems.

Dopping may also refer to:

- Anthony Dopping (bishop of Ossory) (1675–1743), Irish Anglican priest, son of the bishop of Meath
- Anthony Dopping (bishop of Meath) (1643–1697), Irish Anglican priest, father of the bishop of Ossory
- Detlef Dopping, German hurdler at the 2018 World Masters Athletics Championships Men
- Patrick Döpping (also Patrick Doepping), Danish sailor at the 2017 Laser World Championship; see 2015 in aquatic sports
- Staffan Dopping (born 1956), Swedish journalist
- Samuel Dopping (1671–1720), Anglo-Irish politician

== See also ==
- Doping (disambiguation)
- Dopp (disambiguation)
- DOP (disambiguation)
