= It's Alright, It's OK (Primal Scream song) =

Single by Primal Scream

from the album More Light
- Released: 7 May 2013
- Genre: Alternative rock, psychedelic rock, folk rock, gospel
- Length: 5:12
- Label: Ignition Records
- Songwriters: Bobby Gillespie, Andrew Innes
- Producer: David Holmes

Primal Scream singles chronology
"2013" (2013)	"It's Alright, It's OK" (2013)	"Invisible City" (2013)

"It's Alright, It's OK" is a song by the band Primal Scream. It was released as a single on 7 May 2013, as the second single off of the band's tenth album, More Light. The song bears resemblance to "Movin' On Up", the first track from Primal Scream's critically acclaimed 1991 album, Screamadelica. It also appears on the soundtrack for Freaks of Nature (2015), playing over the final scene and end credits.

== Track listing ==
Digital Download

1. "It's Alright, It's OK" - 5:12
2. "The Fire of Love" - 2:55

== Personnel ==
=== Primal Scream ===
- Bobby Gillespie - lead vocals, tambourine
- Andrew Innes - guitar, synthesizer

=== Additional Personnel ===
- Martin Duffy - piano, organ
- Jason Faulkner - bass guitar
- Davy Chegwidden - drums, percussion
- Barrie Cadogan - backing vocals
- Geo Gabriel - backing vocals
- La Donna Harley Peters - backing vocals
- Sharlene Hector - backing vocals
- Josh Homme - guitar on "The Fire of Love"
