= Antietam (band) =

American indie rock band

- Origin: Louisville, Kentucky, United States
- Genres: Indie rock
- Years active: 1984–1996, 2004-present
- Labels: Homestead, Triple X, Carrot Top Records, Motorific Sounds, Dromedary Records
- Members: Tara Key; Tim Harris; Josh Madell
- Past members: Wolf Knapp; Michael Weinert; Sean Mulhall; Charles Schultz
- Website: antietamtheband.com

Antietam is an indie rock band from Louisville, Kentucky formed in 1984 by members of the Babylon Dance Band, husband and wife duo Tara Key and Tim Harris. They released six albums between 1985 and 1995, and since the late 1980s have been based in New York. Their latest album is The Counting Game, released on Dromedary Records in 2026.

== History ==
Key and Harris (both vocalists and multi-instrumentalists, and half of the Babylon Dance Band) initially recruited Wolf Knapp and Michael Weinert to complete the Antietam lineup, the name taken from the site of a battle in the American Civil War. They signed to Homestead Records who issued their eponymous debut in July 1985. By the release of second album Music from Elba, former Babylon Dance Band drummer Sean Mulhall had taken over on drums for that recording only. It would be three years before their next release, the "Eaten up by Hate" twelve-inch single, now on Triple X Records. They followed this with the album Burgoo in 1990, produced by Ira Kaplan and Georgia Hubley of Yo La Tengo, and with Charles Schultz on drums. In late 1990, Josh Madell replaced Schultz, and played on Everywhere Outside (1991) and the live album Antietam Comes Alive!, recorded at CBGB. The band returned to Homestead for the album Rope-a-Dope in 1994. The band's last release from this period was the "Alibi" single in 1996.

Tara Key released two solo albums in 1994 and 1995, featuring Harris and various members of Antietam. After Antietam, Key recorded with Eleventh Dream Day's Rick Rizzo on the album Dark Edson Tiger (2000), and they collaborated again on the 2011 album Double Star. Harris went on to record with Yo La Tengo and The Special Pillow. Madell went on to drum for Codeine and Retsin. In 1996, Key performed with Yo La Tengo as The Factory's house band in the film I Shot Andy Warhol.

After a spell of woodshedding, in 2004, Antietam signed to Carrot Top Records in Chicago and released the albums Victory Park (2004), Opus Mixtum (2008), and Tenth Life (2011).

Intimations of Immortality (2017) was the first release on Motorific Sounds, Antietam's own label.

== Discography ==
=== Antietam ===
==== Albums ====
- Antietam (1985), Homestead
- Music from Elba (1986), Homestead
- Burgoo (1989), Triple X
- Everywhere Outside (1991), Triple X
- Comes Alive! (1992), Triple X
- Rope-a-Dope (1994), Homestead
- Victory Park (2004), Carrot Top
- Opus Mixtum (2008), Carrot Top
- Tenth Life (2011), Carrot Top
- Intimations of Immortality (2017), Motorific Sounds
- His Majesty's Request: A Wink O'Bannon Select (2021), Motorific Sounds
- The Counting Game (2026), Dromedary Records

==== Singles & Extended Plays ====
- Until Now/Rain (1986), Homestead
- Eaten Up by Hate/Naples/Day Before Tomorrow (1989), Triple X
- Alibi/Pegasi 51 (1996), Other Music
- Pitch & Yaw (2024), Motorific Sounds

=== Babylon Dance Band ===
==== Albums ====
- Four on One (1994), Matador

==== Singles ====
- When I'm Home/Remains of the Beat (1981), self-released
- Someday/Rubbertown (1990), Trash Flow

=== Tara Key ===
==== Albums ====
- Bourbon County (1993), Homestead
- Ear and Echo (1995), Homestead

=== Rick Rizzo & Tara Key ===
==== Albums ====
- Dark Edson Tiger (1999), Thrill Jokey
- Double Star (2011), Thrill Jockey
