= 2015 in aquatic sports =

This article lists the in the water and on the water forms of aquatic sports for 2015.

== Aquatics ==
=== Open water swimming ===
- February 1 – September 6: 2015 Open Water Swimming Grand Prix
  - February 1 in (Argentina) Santa Fe–Coronda
    - Event cancelled.
  - February 8 in (Argentina) Villa Urquiza–Paraná
    - Men's winner: (Italy) Mario Sanzullo
    - Women's winner: (Italy) Alice Franco
  - April 25 in (Mexico) Cozumel
    - Men's winner: (Netherlands) Ferry Weertman
    - Women's winner: (Netherlands) Sharon van Rouwendaal
  - July 25 in (Canada) Lac St-Jean
    - Men's winner: (Canada) Xavier Desharnais
    - Women's winner: (Argentina) Pilar Geijo
  - August 29 in (North Macedonia) Lake Ohrid
    - Men's winner: (North Macedonia) Evgenij Pop Acev
    - Women's winner: (Italy) Alice Franco
  - September 6 in (Italy) Capri–Napoli (final)
    - Men's winner: (Argentina) Damián Blaum
    - Women's winner: (Italy) Alice Franco

=== Marathon swimming ===
- February 7 – October 17: 2015 FINA 10 km Marathon Swimming World Cup
  - February 7 in (Argentina) Patagones–Viedma
    - Men's winner: (Italy) Simone Ruffini
    - Women's winner: (Italy) Rachele Bruni
  - March 13 in (United Arab Emirates) Abu Dhabi
    - Men's winner: (France) Axel Reymond
    - Women's winner: (Italy) Rachele Bruni
  - April 18 in (New Caledonia) Nouméa
    - Men's winner: (Australia) Rhys Mainstone
    - Women's winner: (France) Aurélie Muller
  - May 2 in (Mexico) Cozumel
    - Men's winner: (United Kingdom) Jack Burnell
    - Women's winner: (United States) Haley Anderson
  - June 20 in (Hungary) Balatonfüred
    - Men's winner: (United Kingdom) Jack Burnell
    - Women's winner: (Brazil) Ana Marcela Cunha
  - June 27 in (Portugal) Setúbal
    - Men's winner: (United States) Chip Peterson
    - Women's winner: (Italy) Rachele Bruni
  - July 23 in (Canada) Lac St-Jean
    - Men's winner: (United States) Chip Peterson
    - Women's winner: (United States) Christine Jennings
  - July 30 in (Canada) Lac Megantic
    - Men's winner: (Australia) Rhys Mainstone
    - Women's winner: (Italy) Rachele Bruni
  - October 11 in (China) Chun'an, Hangzhou
    - Men's winner: (Brazil) Allan do Carmo
    - Women's winner: (Brazil) Ana Marcela Cunha
  - October 17 in Hong Kong (final)
    - Men's winner: (Germany) Christian Reichert
    - Women's winner: (United Kingdom) Keri-Anne Payne
- August 22 & 23: Aquece Rio International Marathon Swimming Event 2015 in Brazil (Olympic Test Event)
  - Men's winner: (Brazil) Allan do Carmo
  - Women's winner: (United Kingdom) Keri-Anne Payne

=== Diving ===
- February 20 – November 1: 2015 FINA Diving Grand Prix
  - February 20–22: Grand Prix #1 in (Germany) Rostock
    - Men's 3m Springboard winner: (Mexico) Jahir Ocampo
    - Women's 3m Springboard winner: (China) Qu Lin
    - Men's 10m Platform winner: (Germany) Sascha Klein
    - Women's 10m Platform winner: (Canada) Meaghan Benfeito
    - Men's Synchronized 3m Springboard winners: (Ukraine) Oleksandr Horshkovozov / Illya Kvasha
    - Women's Synchronized 3m Springboard winners: (China) Qu Lin / Wu Chunting
    - Men's Synchronized 10m Platform winners: (Germany) Patrick Hausding / Sascha Klein
    - Women's Synchronized 10m Platform winners: (Canada) Meaghan Benfeito / Roseline Filion
  - April 2–5: Grand Prix #2 in (Mexico) León, Guanajuato
    - Men's 3m Springboard winner: (Mexico) Jahir Ocampo
    - Women's 3m Springboard winner: (China) WU Chunting
    - Men's 10m Platform winner: (Mexico) Jonathan Ruvalcaba
    - Women's 10m Platform winner: (China) JI Siyu
    - Men's Synchronized 3m Springboard winners: (Mexico) Jonathan Ruvalcaba / Carlos Moreno Arellano
    - Women's Synchronized 3m Springboard winners: (China) Lin Qu / WU Chunting
    - Men's Synchronized 10m Platform winners: (China) WANG Anqi / HUANG Bowen
    - Women's Synchronized 10m Platform winners: (Mexico) Gabriela Agundez / Karla Rivas
    - Mixed Synchronized 3m Springboard winners: (China) LIU Lingrui / HU Qiyuan
    - Mixed Synchronized 10m Platform winners: (Mexico) Alejandra Estrella Madrigal / Diego Balleza
  - April 9–12: Grand Prix #3 in (Canada) Gatineau
    - Men's 3m Springboard winner: (Mexico) Jahir Ocampo
    - Women's 3m Springboard winner: (China) WU Chunting
    - Men's 10m Platform winner: (Mexico) Diego Balleza
    - Women's 10m Platform winner: (China) JI Siyu
    - Men's Synchronized 3m Springboard winners: (Canada) François Imbeau-Dulac / Philippe Gagne
    - Women's Synchronized 3m Springboard winners: (China) Lin Qu / WU Chunting
    - Men's Synchronized 10m Platform winners: (Canada) Vincent Riendeau / Philippe Gagne
    - Women's Synchronized 10m Platform winners: (China) DING Yaying / JI Siyu
    - Mixed Synchronized 3m Springboard winners: (Canada) François Imbeau-Dulac / Jennifer Abel
    - Mixed Synchronized 10m Platform winners: (Canada) Vincent Riendeau / Meaghan Benfeito
  - April 16–19: Grand Prix #4 in (Puerto Rico) San Juan
    - Men's 3m Springboard winner: (Japan) Ken Terauchi
    - Women's 3m Springboard winner: (Japan) Minami Itahashi
    - Men's 10m Platform winner: (China) HU Qiyuan
    - Women's 10m Platform winner: (China) JI Siyu
    - Men's Synchronized 3m Springboard winners: (Japan) Sho Sakai / Ken Terauchi
    - Women's Synchronized 3m Springboard winners: (China) Lin Qu / WU Chunting
    - Men's Synchronized 10m Platform winners: (China) HUANG Bowen / WANG Anqi
    - Women's Synchronized 10m Platform winners: (China) JI Siyu / DING Yaying
    - Mixed Synchronized 3m Springboard winners (Malaysia) Loh Zhiayi / Mohammad Syafiq
    - Mixed Synchronized 10m Platform winners: (Brazil) Ingrid Oliveira / Luiz Felipe Outerelo
  - June 26–28: Grand Prix #5 in (Spain) Madrid
    - Men's 3m Springboard winner: (Poland) Andrzej Rzeszutek
    - Women's 3m Springboard winner: (China) XU Zhihuan
    - Men's 10m Platform winner: (China) HUANG Bowen
    - Women's 10m Platform winner: (China) JI Siyu
    - Men's Synchronized 3m Springboard winners: (China) WEI Zhong / DIAO Zhiguang
    - Women's Synchronized 3m Springboard winners: (China) JIA Dongjin / XU Zhihuan
    - Men's Synchronized 10m Platform winners: (China) HUANG Zigan / CAO Lizhi
    - Women's Synchronized 10m Platform winners: (China) DING Yaying / JI Siyu
  - July 3–5: Grand Prix #6 in (Italy) Bolzano
    - Men's 3m Springboard winner: (China) WEI Zhong
    - Women's 3m Springboard winner: (China) XU Zhihuan
    - Men's 10m Platform winner: (Japan) Yu Okamoto
    - Women's 10m Platform winner: (China) DING Yaying
    - Men's Synchronized 3m Springboard winners: (China) DIAO Zhiguang / WEI Zhong
    - Women's Synchronized 3m Springboard winners: (China) XU Zhihuan / JIA Dongjin
    - Men's Synchronized 10m Platform winners: (China) HUANG Zigan / CAO Lizhi
    - Women's Synchronized 10m Platform winners: (China) JI Siyu / DING Yaying
    - Mixed Synchronized 3m Springboard winners: (Canada) Melissa Citrini-Beaulieu / Marc Sabourin-Germain
    - Mixed Synchronized 10m Platform winners: (Mexico) Diego Balleza / Paola Pineda
  - October 16–18: Grand Prix #7 in Singapore
    - Men's 3m Springboard winner: (China) PENG Jianfeng
    - Women's 3m Springboard winner: (China) WU Chunting
    - Men's 10m Platform winner: (China) WANG Anqi
    - Women's 10m Platform winner: (United Kingdom) Lois Toulson
    - Men's Synchronized 3m Springboard winners: (China) LI Yanan / ZHONG Yuming
    - Women's Synchronized 3m Springboard winners: (China) XU Zhihuan / WU Chunting
    - Men's Synchronized 10m Platform winners: (China) GAO Ang / WANG Anqi
    - Women's Synchronized 10m Platform winners: (China) Wang Ying / Wang Han
    - Mixed Synchronized 3m Springboard winners: (China) LI Yannan / WU Chunting
    - Mixed Synchronized 10m Platform winners: (China) YING Wang / WANG Anqi
  - October 23–25: Grand Prix #8 in (Malaysia) Kuala Lumpur
    - Men's 3m Springboard winner: (China) PENG Jianfeng
    - Women's 3m Springboard winner: (China) WU Chunting
    - Men's 10m Platform winner: (China) WANG Anqi
    - Women's 10m Platform winner: (China) Wang Ying
    - Men's Synchronized 3m Springboard winners: (Malaysia) Chew Yiwei / Ahmad Azman
    - Women's Synchronized 3m Springboard winners: (China) WU Chunting / XU Zhihuan
    - Men's Synchronized 10m Platform winners: (China) GAO Ang / WANG Anqi
    - Women's Synchronized 10m Platform winners: (Malaysia) Cheong Jun Hoong / Nur Dhabitah Sabri
    - Mixed Synchronized 3m Springboard winners: (China) WU Chunting / LI Yanan
    - Mixed Synchronized 10m Platform winners: (Malaysia) Chew Yiwei / Cheong Jun Hoong
  - October 29 – November 1: Grand Prix #9 (final) in (Australia) Gold Coast
    - Men's 3m Springboard winner: (China) HUANG Bowen
    - Women's 3m Springboard winner: (China) Wang Han
    - Men's 10m Platform winner: (China) HUANG Zigan
    - Women's 10m Platform winner: (China) JI Siyu
    - Men's Synchronized 3m Springboard winners: (Germany) Stephan Feck / Patrick Hausding
    - Women's Synchronized 3m Springboard winners: (Australia) Samantha Mills / Esther Qin
    - Men's Synchronized 10m Platform winners: (Germany) Patrick Hausding / Sascha Klein
    - Women's Synchronized 10m Platform winners: (China) JI Siyu / DING Yaying
    - Mixed Synchronized 3m Springboard winners: (Malaysia) Ng Yan Yee / Muhammad Syafiq Puteh
    - Mixed Synchronized 10m Platform winners: (Australia) Nicholas Jeffree / Lara Tarvit
- March 13 – May 31: 2015 FINA Diving World Series
  - March 13–15: World Series #1 in (China) Beijing
    - Men's 3m Springboard winner: (China) He Chong
    - Women's 3m Springboard winner: (China) Shi Tingmao
    - Men's 10m Platform winner: (China) Yang Jian
    - Women's 10m Platform winner: (China) Liu Huixia
    - Men's Synchronized 3m Springboard winners: (China) Cao Yuan / Qin Kai
    - Women's Synchronized 3m Springboard winners: (China) Shi Tingmao / Wu Minxia
    - Men's Synchronized 10m Platform winners: (China) Chen Aisen / Lin Yue
    - Women's Synchronized 10m Platform winners: (China) Chen Ruolin / Liu Huixia
    - Mixed Synchronized 3m Springboard winners: (China) Chen Aisen / He Zi
    - Mixed Synchronized 10m Platform winners: (China) LIAN Jie / TAI Xiaohu
  - March 19–21: World Series #2 in (United Arab Emirates) Dubai
    - Men's 3m Springboard winner: (United Kingdom) Jack Laugher
    - Women's 3m Springboard winner: (China) SHI Tingmao
    - Men's 10m Platform winner: (China) Qiu Bo
    - Women's 10m Platform winner: (China) Chen Ruolin
    - Men's Synchronized 3m Springboard winners: (China) Qin Kai / CAO Yuan
    - Women's Synchronized 3m Springboard winners: (China) WU Minxia / SHI Tingmao
    - Men's Synchronized 10m Platform winners: (China) Lin Yue / Chen Aisen
    - Women's Synchronized 10m Platform winners: (China) Chen Ruolin / LIU Huixia
    - Mixed Synchronized 3m Springboard winners: (China) He Zi / Chen Aisen
    - Mixed Synchronized 10m Platform winners: (China) TAI Xiaohu / LIAN Jie
  - April 24–26: World Series #3 in (Russia) Kazan
    - Men's 3m Springboard winner: (United Kingdom) Jack Laugher
    - Women's 3m Springboard winner: (China) SHI Tingmao
    - Men's 10m Platform winner: (China) Qiu Bo
    - Women's 10m Platform winner: (Canada) Meaghan Benfeito
    - Men's Synchronized 3m Springboard winners: (China) Qin Kai / CAO Yuan
    - Women's Synchronized 3m Springboard winners: (China) WU Minxia / SHI Tingmao
    - Men's Synchronized 10m Platform winners: (China) Lin Yue / Chen Aisen
    - Women's Synchronized 10m Platform winners: (China) Chen Ruolin / LIU Huixia
    - Mixed Synchronized 3m Springboard winners: (China) YANG Hao / WANG Han
    - Mixed Synchronized 10m Platform winners: (China) LIAN Junjie / Si Yajie
  - May 1–3: World Series #4 in (United Kingdom) London
    - Men's 3m Springboard winner: (Russia) Evgeny Kuznetsov
    - Women's 3m Springboard winner: (China) SHI Tingmao
    - Men's 10m Platform winner: (United Kingdom) Tom Daley
    - Women's 10m Platform winner: (Canada) Roseline Filion
    - Men's Synchronized 3m Springboard winners: (China) Qin Kai / CAO Yuan
    - Women's Synchronized 3m Springboard winners: (China) WU Minxia / SHI Tingmao
    - Men's Synchronized 10m Platform winners: (China) LIN Yue / CHEN Aisen
    - Women's Synchronized 10m Platform winners: (China) CHEN Ruolin / LIU Huixia
    - Mixed Synchronized 3m Springboard winners: (China) YANG Hao / WANG Ha
    - Mixed Synchronized 10m Platform winners: (China) LIAN Junjie / Si Yajie
  - May 22–24: World Series #5 in (Canada) Windsor, Ontario
    - Men's 3m Springboard winner: (United Kingdom) Jack Laugher
    - Women's 3m Springboard winner: (China) He Zi
    - Men's 10m Platform winner: (China) Yang Jian
    - Women's 10m Platform winner: (China) REN Qian
    - Men's Synchronized 3m Springboard winners: (China) He Chao / He Chong
    - Women's Synchronized 3m Springboard winners: (China) He Zi / Wang Han
    - Men's Synchronized 10m Platform winners: (China) Yang Jian / Lin Yue
    - Women's Synchronized 10m Platform winners: (China) Si Yajie / LIAN Jie
    - Mixed Synchronized 3m Springboard winners: (China) He Zi / Lin Yue
    - Mixed Synchronized 10m Platform winners: (China) LIAN Jie / TAI Xiaohu
  - May 29–31: World Series #6 (final) in (Mexico) Mérida, Yucatán
    - Men's 3m Springboard winner: (Mexico) Rommel Pacheco
    - Women's 3m Springboard winner: (China) HE Zi
    - Men's 10m Platform winner: (China) Yang Jian
    - Women's 10m Platform winner: (China) SI Yajie
    - Men's Synchronized 3m Springboard winners: (China) HE Chao / HE Chong
    - Women's Synchronized 3m Springboard winners: (China) HE Zi / WANG Han
    - Men's Synchronized 10m Platform winners: (Mexico) Germán Sánchez / Iván García
    - Women's Synchronized 10m Platform winners: (China) SI Yajie / LIAN Jie
    - Mixed Synchronized 3m Springboard winners: (Canada) Jennifer Abel / François Imbeau-Dulac
    - Mixed Synchronized 10m Platform winners: (China) TAI Xiaohu / LIAN Jie
- May 8–10: 2015 FINA High Diving World Cup in (Mexico) Cozumel
  - Men's High Dive winner: (Colombia) Orlando Duque
  - Women's High Dive winner: (United States) Rachelle Simpson
- June 9–14: 2015 European Diving Championships in (Germany) Rostock
  - Russia and Italy won 3 gold medals each. Russia won the overall medal tally.

=== FINA Swimming World Cup ===
- August 11 – November 7: 2015 FINA Swimming World Cup
  - August 11 & 12: World Cup #1 in (Russia) Moscow
    - The United States won both the gold and overall medal tallies.
    - Men's Overall Points Leader #1: (South Africa) Cameron van der Burgh
    - Women's Overall Points Leader #1: (Hungary) Katinka Hosszú
  - August 15 & 16: World Cup #2 in (France) Chartres/Paris
    - South Africa won the gold medal tally. The United States won the overall medal tally.
    - Men's Overall Points Leader #2: (South Africa) Cameron van der Burgh
    - Women's Overall Points Leader #2: (Hungary) Katinka Hosszú
  - September 25 & 26: World Cup #3 in Hong Kong
    - Australia and Hungary won 9 gold medals each. Australia won the overall medal tally.
    - Men's Overall Points Leader #3: (South Africa) Cameron van der Burgh
    - Women's Overall Points Leader #3: (Hungary) Katinka Hosszú
  - September 29 & 30: World Cup #4 in Beijing
    - China won both the gold and overall medal tallies.
    - Men's Overall Points Leader #4: (South Africa) Cameron van der Burgh
    - Women's Overall Points Leader #4: (Hungary) Katinka Hosszú
  - October 3 & 4: World Cup #5 in Singapore
  - Note: 17 swimming events were cancelled, due to bad air quality at the site. Therefore, only 15 events were contested.
    - Australia won both the gold and overall medal tallies.
    - Men's Overall Points Leader #5: (South Africa) Cameron van der Burgh
    - Women's Overall Points Leader #5: (Hungary) Katinka Hosszú
  - October 28 & 29: World Cup #6 in Tokyo
    - Japan won both the gold and overall medal tallies.
    - Men's Overall Points Leader #6: (South Africa) Cameron van der Burgh
    - Women's Overall Points Leader #6: (Hungary) Katinka Hosszú
  - November 2 & 3: World Cup #7 in (Qatar) Doha
    - Australia won the gold medal tally. The United States won the overall medal tally.
    - Men's Overall Points Leader #7: (South Africa) Cameron van der Burgh
    - Women's Overall Points Leader #7: (Hungary) Katinka Hosszú
  - November 6 & 7: World Cup #8 (final) in (United Arab Emirates) Dubai
    - Australia won the gold medal tally. The United States won the overall medal tally.
    - Men's Overall Points Champion: (South Africa) Cameron van der Burgh
    - Women's Overall Points Champion: (Hungary) Katinka Hosszú

=== Synchronized swimming ===
- December 11–13: 2015 FINA Synchronized Swimming World Trophy in Shaoxing
  - China won both the gold and overall medal tallies.

=== Aquatics world championships ===
- July 13–19: 2015 IPC Swimming World Championships in (United Kingdom) Glasgow
  - Russia won both the gold and overall medal tallies.
- July 24 – August 9: 2015 World Aquatics Championships in (Russia) Kazan
  - China won both the gold and overall medal tallies.
- August 5–16: 2015 FINA World Masters Championships in (Russia) Kazan
  - For results, click here.
- August 25–30: 2015 FINA World Junior Swimming Championships in Singapore
  - Gold Medal count: Australia
  - Championships Trophy: The United States
  - Men's overall ranking: (Russia) Anton Chupkov
  - Women's overall ranking: (Turkey) Viktoriya Zeynep Gunes
  - FINA Trophy: (Turkey) Viktoriya Zeynep Gunes

== Canoeing ==
=== Canoe sprint (flatwater) ===
- May 15–31: 2015 ICF Canoe Sprint World Cup
  - May 15–17: World Cup #1 in (Portugal) Montemor-o-Velho
    - Canada won the gold medal tally. Canada and Spain won 9 overall medals each.
  - May 22–24: World Cup #2 in Duisburg
    - Host nation, Germany, and Belarus won 6 gold medals each. Germany won the overall medal tally.
  - May 29–31: World Cup #3 (final) in (Denmark) Copenhagen
    - Germany won both the gold and overall medal tallies.
- May 1–3: 2015 Canoe Sprint European Championships in (Czech Republic) Račice
  - Germany won the gold medal tally. Germany, Russia, and Belarus won 11 overall medals each.
- July 24–26: 2015 ICF Junior and U23 Canoe Sprint World Championships in (Portugal) Montemor-o-Velho
  - U23: Hungary won both the gold and overall medal tallies.
  - Junior: Hungary won the gold medal tally. Hungary and Ukraine won 7 overall medals each.
- August 19–23: 2015 ICF Canoe Sprint World Championships in (Italy) Milan
  - Main event: Belarus won the gold medal tally. Hungary won the overall medal tally.
  - Paracanoe: Australia and Brazil won 3 gold medals each. Brazil and Great Britain won 7 overall medals each.
- September 4–6: Aquece Rio International Canoe Sprint 2015 in Brazil (Olympic and Paralympic Test Event)
  - Belarus and the Czech Republic won 2 gold medals each. Germany won the overall medal tally.

=== Whitewater slalom (canoe) ===
- June 19 – August 16: 2015 Canoe Slalom World Cup
  - June 19–21: World Cup #1 in Prague
    - The Czech Republic won both the gold and overall medal tallies.
  - June 26–28: World Cup #2 in (Poland) Kraków
    - Men's C1 winner: (Slovakia) Matej Beňuš
    - Men's K1 winner: (Czech Republic) Vavřinec Hradilek
    - Women's C1 winner: (Australia) Jessica Fox
    - Women's K1 winner: (Spain) Maialen Chourraut
    - Men's C2 winners: (Czech Republic) Jonáš Kašpar / Marek Šindler
  - July 3–5: World Cup #3 in Liptovský Mikuláš
    - Slovakia won both the gold and overall medal tallies.
  - August 7–9: World Cup #4 in (Spain) La Seu d'Urgell
    - France won both the gold and overall medal tallies.
  - August 14–16: World Cup #5 (final) in Pau
    - France won the gold medal tally. France and Great Britain won 5 overall medals each.
- January 31 & February 1: 2015 Oceania Canoe Slalom Championships in (New Zealand) Mangahao River
  - Men's Canoe Singles: (Canada) Liam Smedley
  - Men's Canoe Doubles: (New Zealand) Daniel Munro and Luke Robinson
  - Women's Canoe Singles: (Australia) Rosalyn Lawrence
  - Men's Kayak: (New Zealand) Michael Dawson
  - Women's Kayak: (Australia) Rosalyn Lawrence
- April 22–26: 2015 ICF Junior and U23 Canoe Slalom World Championships in (Brazil) Foz do Iguaçu
  - The Czech Republic, Germany, and Slovakia won 3 gold medals each. The Czech Republic won the overall medal tally.
- May 28–31: 2015 European Senior Canoe Slalom Championships in Markkleeberg
  - Slovakia won the gold medal tally. Germany and Great Britain won 6 overall medals each.
- August 26–30: 2015 European Junior and U23 Canoe Slalom Championships in (Poland) Kraków
  - The Czech Republic won both the gold and overall medal tallies.
- September 16–20: 2015 ICF Canoe Slalom World Championships in (United Kingdom) London (at the Lee Valley White Water Centre)
  - Men's C1 winner: (United Kingdom) David Florence
  - Men's Team C1 winners: Slovakia (Michal Martikán, Alexander Slafkovský, Matej Beňuš)
  - Men's C2 winners: Germany (Franz Anton, Jan Benzien)
  - Men's Team C2 winners: France (Pierre Picco, Hugo Biso, Gauthier Klauss, Matthieu Péché, Yves Prigent, Loic Kervella)
  - Men's K1 winner: (Czech Republic) Jiří Prskavec
  - Men's Team K1 winners: Czech Republic (Jiří Prskavec, Vavřinec Hradilek, Ondřej Tunka)
  - Women's C1 winner: (Australia) Jessica Fox
  - Women's Team C1 winners: Australia (Jessica Fox, Rosalyn Lawrence, Alison Borrows)
  - Women's K1 winner: (Czech Republic) Kateřina Kudějová
  - Women's Team K1 winners: Czech Republic (Kateřina Kudějová, Veronika Vojtova, Štěpánka Hilgertová)
- November 26–29: Aquece Rio International Canoe Slalom 2015 in Brazil (Olympic Test Event)
  - Men's Canoe Singles winner: (United Kingdom) David Florence
  - Men's Kayak Singles winner: (France) Mathieu Biazizzo
  - Men's Canoe Doubles winners: (Slovenia) Sašo Taljat / Luka Božič
  - Women's Kayak Singles winner: (Austria) Violetta Oblinger-Peters

== Rowing ==
=== World Rowing Cup ===
- May 8 – July 12: 2015 World Rowing Cup Events
  - May 8–10: 2015 World Rowing Cup #1 in (Slovenia) Bled (Lake Bled)
    - Germany won the gold medal tally. China won the overall medal tally.
  - June 19–21: 2015 World Rowing Cup #2 in (Italy) Varese (Lake Varese)
    - Great Britain won both the gold and overall medal tallies.
  - July 10–12: 2015 World Rowing Cup #3 (final) in (Switzerland) Lucerne (Lake Rotsee)
    - New Zealand won both the gold and overall medal tallies.

=== Other rowing competitions ===
- January 31: 2015 European Rowing Indoor Championships in (Poland) Szczecin
  - Men's Open winner: (Lithuania) Rolandas Maščinskas
  - Women's Open winner: (Ukraine) Olena Buryak
  - Men's Lightweight winner: (Poland) Artur Mikołajczewski
  - Women's Lightweight winner: (Lithuania) Donata Vištartaitė
- March 1: FISA World Indoor Rowing Championships 2015 in (United States) Boston
  - Men's Open Lightweight winner: (Faroe Islands) Dánjal Martin Hofgaard
  - Men's Open Heavyweight winner: (Cuba) Ángel Fournier
  - Women's Open Lightweight winner: (United States) Erin Roberts
  - Women's Open Heavyweight winner: (Estonia) Kaisa Pajusalu
- May 23 & 24: 2015 European Rowing Junior Championships in (Czech Republic) Račice
  - Italy won the gold medal tally. Romania won the overall medal tally.
- May 29–31: 2015 European Rowing Championships in (Poland) Poznań
  - Great Britain won both the gold and overall medal tallies.
- July 22–26: 2015 World Rowing U23 Championships in (Bulgaria) Plovdiv
  - Italy won the gold medal tally. Italy, Germany, and Great Britain won 6 overall medals each.
- August 5–9: 2015 World Rowing Junior Championships in (Brazil) Rio de Janeiro (Olympic Test Event)
  - Germany won both the gold and overall medal tally.
- August 30 – September 6: 2015 World Rowing Championships in (France) Lac d'Aiguebelette
  - Great Britain and New Zealand won 5 gold medals each. Great Britain won the overall medal tally.
- September 10–13: 2015 World Rowing Masters Regatta in (Belgium) Hazewinkel
  - For Thursday's results, click here.
  - For Friday's results, click here.
  - For Saturday's results, click here.
  - For Sunday's results, click here.
- September 24–28: 2015 ARF Asian Rowing Championships in Beijing
  - China won both the gold and overall medal tallies.
- October 5–11: 2015 FISA African Olympic Qualification Regatta and the 2015 African Rowing Junior and Senior Championships in (Tunisia) Tunis
- FISA African Olympic Qualification Regatta (October 5–7)
  - Men's Single Sculls winner: (Egypt) Elkhalek Abd Elbanna
  - Women's Single Sculls winner: (Zimbabwe) Micheen Thornycroft
  - Men's Lightweight Double Sculls winners: Egypt (Emira Omar Elsobhy / Mohamed Nofel)
  - Women's Lightweight Double Sculls winners: Tunisia (Nour El Hiuda Ettaieb / Khadija Krimi)
- FISA African Rowing Junior and Senior Championships (October 9–11)
  - Algeria and Egypt won 5 gold medals each. Egypt won the overall medal tally.
- November 13–15: 2015 World Rowing Coastal Championships in Lima
  - France won the gold medal tally. Peru won the overall medal tally.

== Sailing ==
=== ISAF Sailing World Cup ===
- December 7, 2014 – November 1, 2015: 2014–15 ISAF Sailing World Cup
  - December 7–14, 2014: World Cup #1 in Melbourne
    - Host nation, Australia, won both the gold and overall medal tallies.
  - January 24–31, 2015: World Cup #2 in (United States) Miami
    - Great Britain won both the gold and overall medal tallies.
  - April 20–26, 2015: World Cup #3 in Hyères
    - Host nation, France, won both the gold and overall medal tallies.
  - June 8–14, 2015: World Cup #4 in (United Kingdom) Weymouth and Portland
    - Host nation, Great Britain, won both the gold and overall medal tallies.
  - September 14–20, 2015: World Cup #5 in Qingdao
    - Host nation, China, won both the gold and overall medal tallies.
  - October 27 – November 1, 2015: World Cup #6 (final) in (United Arab Emirates) Abu Dhabi
    - Great Britain won the gold medal tally. Great Britain and Spain won 4 overall medals each.

=== EUROSAF Champions Sailing Cup ===
- March 30 – October 9, 2015: EUROSAF Champions Sailing Cup 2015
  - March 30 – April 4: #1 EUROSAF Champions Sailing Cup in (Spain) Palma de Mallorca
    - Men's RS:X winner: (Netherlands) Kiran Badloe
    - Men's Laser winner: (Germany) Philipp Buhl
    - Men's Finn winner: (United Kingdom) Giles Scott
    - Men's 470 winners: Argentina (Lucas Calabrese, Juan de la Fuente)
    - Men's 49er winners: New Zealand (Peter Burling, Blair Tuke)
    - Women's RS:X winner: (France) Charline Picon
    - Women's Laser Radial winner: (Belgium) Evi Van Acker
    - Women's 470 winners: New Zealand (Jo Aleh, Polly Powrie)
    - Women's 49er FX winners: Denmark (Maiken Foght Schütt, Anne-Julie Schütt)
    - Mixed Nacra winners: France (Billy Besson, Marie Riou)
  - May 6–10: #2 EUROSAF Champions Sailing Cup in Riva del Garda
    - Men's Laser winner: (France) Jean-Baptiste Bernaz
    - Women's Laser Radial winner: (Belgium) Evi Van Acker
    - Men's 470 winners: Italy (Simon Sivitz Kosuta, Jas Farneti)
    - Women's 470 winners: Slovenia (Tina Mrak, Veronika Macarol)
    - Men's 49er winners: Italy (Ruggi Tita, Giacomo Cavalli)
    - Women's 49er FX winners: Italy (Giulia Conti, Francesca Clapcich)
    - Mixed Nacra winners: Italy (Vittorio Bissaro, Silvia Sicouri)
    - Men's RS:X winner: (Italy) Daniele Benedetti
    - Women's RS:X winner: (France) Meg Berenice
    - 2.4 Metre winners: Italy Antonio Squizzato
  - May 26–30: Delta Lloyd Regatta in (Netherlands) Medemblik
    - Men's RS:X winner: (Poland) Paweł Tarnowski
    - Men's Laser winner: (Australia) Matthew Wearn
    - Men's Finn winner: (Netherlands) Pieter-Jan Postma
    - Men's 470 winner: (Sweden) (Johan Molund, Sebastian Östling)
    - Men's 49er winner: (Spain) Diego Botin
    - Women's RS:X winner: (Poland) Maja Dziarnowska
    - Women's Laser Radial winner: (Netherlands) Marit Bouwmeester
    - Women's 470 winner: (United Kingdom) Sophie Weguelin
    - Women's 49er FX winner: (Netherlands) Annemiek Bekkering
    - Mixed Nacra 17 winners: Denmark (Lin Ea Cenholt, Christian Peter Lübeck)
    - SKUD 18 winners: Australia (Daniel Fitzgibbon, Liesl Tesch)
    - Sonar winner: (Australia) Colin Harrison
    - 2.4 Metre winners: (France) Damien Seguin
  - June 10–14: EUROSAF Champions Cup in Weymouth and Portland
    - Men's RS:X winner: (United Kingdom) Nick Dempsey
    - Men's Laser winner: (Germany) Philipp Buhl
    - Men's Finn winner: (United Kingdom) Giles Scott
    - Men's 470 winners: United States (Stuart McNay, David Hughes)
    - Men's 49er winners: New Zealand (Peter Burling, Blair Tuke)
    - Women's RS:X winner: (Italy) Flavia Tartaglini
    - Women's Laser Radial winner: (Netherlands) Marit Bouwmeester
    - Women's 470 winners: United Kingdom (Hannah Mills, Saskia Clark)
    - Women's 49er FX winners: Brazil (Martine Soffiatti Grael, Kahena Kunze)
    - Mixed Nacra 17 winners: Australia (Jason Waterhouse, Lisa Darmanin)
  - June 20–24: Kieler Woche in Kiel
    - Men's Laser winner: (Germany) Tobias Schadewaldt
    - Men's Finn winner: (Estonia) Deniss Karpak
    - Men's 470 winners: Croatia (Sime Fantel, Algor Marenic)
    - Men's 49er winners: Germany (Justus Schmidt, Max Boehme)
    - Women's Laser Radial winner: (United States) Erika Reineke
    - Women's 470 winners: Austria (Lara Vadlau, Jolanta Ogar)
    - Women's 49er FX winners: Netherlands (Annemiek Bekkering, Daniel Bramervaer)
    - Mixed Nacra 17 winners: Germany (Paul Kohlhoff, Carolina Werner)

=== Other sailing championships and the Nations Cup ===
- February 27 – July 19: 2015 ISAF Nations Cup
  - February 27 – March 2: Oceania Final in (Australia) Brisbane
    - Men's winner: (New Zealand) Chris Steele
    - Women's winner: (Australia) Milly Bennett
  - March 16–20: Africa Final in (Tunisia) Tunis
    - Winner: (Tunisia) Mohamed Kamel Souissi
  - April 2–5: South America Final in (Argentina) Buenos Aires
    - Event Cancelled
  - April 22–26: Asia Final in (Bahrain) Zallaq
    - Winner: (Japan) Kohei Ichikawa
  - May 7–10: Europe Final in (Republic of Ireland) Dublin
    - Men's winner: (France) Pierre Rhimbault
    - Women's winner: (France) Pauline Courtois
  - May 28–31: North America and Caribbean Final in (United States) San Diego
    - Event Cancelled
  - July 14–19: Grand Final in (Russia) Vladivostok
    - Men's winner: (Russia) Vladimir Lipavsky
    - Women's winner: (United States) Nicole Breault
- July 2–8: ISAF Laser World Championship 2015 in (Canada) Kingston
  - Winner: (United Kingdom) Nick Thompson
- July 5–10: ISAF Nacra 17 World Championships 2015 in (Denmark) Aarhus
  - Winners: France (Billy Besson, Marie Riou)
- July 8–12: 2015 ISAF Women's Match Racing World Championship in (Denmark) Middelfart
  - Winner: (Denmark) Lotte Meldgaard
- July 13–18: ISAF Youth RS:X World Championships 2015 in (Poland) Gdynia
  - Men's Youth RS:X winner: (Israel) Yoav Omer
  - Women's Youth RS:X winner: (Israel) Noy Drihan
- July 19–24: 2015 ISAF Team Racing World Championship in (United Kingdom) Rutland (at the Rutland Sailing Club)
  - Senior winners: Team United States One (Michael Menninger, Justin Law, Adrienne Kamiler, Haley Kirk, Lucy Wallace, Tyler Sinks)
  - Youth winners: Team USA Y1 (Eli Burnes, Henry Burnes, Charlie Hibben, Paige Dunleavy, Ginny Alex, Peter Barron)
- July 19–24: 2015 ISAF Laser Radial World Championship 2015 in (Denmark) Aarhus
  - Winner: (Poland) Marcin Rudawski
- July 26–31: ISAF Junior 470 World Championships 2015 in (Greece) Thessaloniki
  - Men's Junior 470 winners: France (Guillaume Pirouelle, Valentin Sipan)
  - Women's Junior 470 winners: Italy (Benedetta Di Salle, Alessandra Dubbini)
- August 9–14: ISAF Youth Laser 4.7 World Championships 2015 in (Netherlands) Medemblik
  - Men's Under 16 Laser 4.7 winner: (Italy) Guido Gallinaro
  - Men's Youth Laser 4.7 winner: (Spain) Alejandro Bethencourt Fuentes
  - Women's Under 16 Laser 4.7 winner: (Germany) Julia Büsselberg
  - Women's Youth Laser 4.7 winner: (Ukraine) Kateryna Gumenko
- August 15–22: Aquece Rio International Sailing Regatta 2015 in Brazil (Olympic Test Event)
  - Australia won the gold medal tally. France won the overall medal tally.
- August 15–22: ISAF Youth Laser Radial World Championships 2015 in (Canada) Kingston
  - Men's Youth Laser Radial winner: (Australia) Conor Nicholas
  - Women's Youth Laser Radial winner: (Hungary) Mária Érdi
- August 17–22: Women's and Men's Sailing ISAF Under 21 Laser World Championship 2015 in (Netherlands) Medemblik
  - Men's Under 21 Laser winner: (Spain) Joel Rodriguez
  - Women's Under 21 Laser Radial winner: (Netherlands) Maxime Jonker
- September 15–19: 2015 ISAF Youth Match Racing World Championship in (Poland) Świnoujście
  - Winner: Team Australia and Sam Gilmour
  - Second: Team Denmark and Joakim Aschenbrenner
  - Third: Team Finland and Marcus Ronnberg
  - Fourth: Team United States and Nevin Snow
- October 12–17: ISAF 470 World Championships 2015 in (Israel) Haifa
  - Women's 470 winners: Austria (Lara Vadlau, Jolanta Ogar)
  - Men's 470 winners: Australia (Mathew Belcher, William Ryan)
- November 26 – December 3: 2015 Para World Sailing Championships in (Australia) Melbourne (at the Royal Yacht Club of Victoria)
  - For results, click here.
- December 27, 2015 – January 3, 2016: 2015 ISAF Youth Sailing World Championships in (Malaysia) Langkawi
  - Australia and France won 2 gold medals each. New Zealand won the overall medal tally.

=== Other sailing events ===
- January 7–11: OSAF 49er & 49er FX Oceanian Championships 2015 in (Australia) Perth
  - 49er winners: (Australia) David Gilmour/Rhys Mara
  - 49er FX winners: (Australia) Tess Lloyd/Caitlin Elks
- May 12–17: Men's Sailing EUROSAF Finn European Championships 2015 in (Croatia) Split
  - Men's winner: (Croatia) Ivan Kljaković Gašpić
  - Men's Junior winner: (Russia) Arkadiy Kistanov
- June 22–27: Sailing EUROSAF RS:X European Championships 2015 in (Italy) Palermo
  - Men's RS:X winner: (Poland) Paweł Tarnowski
  - Men's Under 21 RS:X winner: (Italy) Mattia Camboni
  - Men's Youth RS:X winner: (Netherlands) Sil Hoekstra
  - Men's Under 17 RS:X winner: (Netherlands) Sil Hoekstra
  - Women's winner: (United Kingdom) Bryony Shaw
  - Women's Under 21 RS:X winner: (Russia) Stefania Elfutina
  - Women's Youth RS:X winner: (Israel) Noy Drihan
- June 29 – July 4: Sailing EUROSAF 470 European Championships 2015 in (Denmark) Aarhus
  - Men's 470 winners: Germany (Ferdinand Gerz/Oliver Szymanski)
  - Women's 470 winners: Slovenia (Tina Mrak/Veronika Macarol)
- July 6–12: EUROSAF 49er & 49er FX European Championships 2015 in (Portugal) Porto
  - Men's 49er winners: Germany (Justus Schmidt, Max Boehme)
  - Women's 49er FX winners: Italy (Giulia Conti, Francesca Clapcich)
- July 19–24: 2015 EUROSAF Laser & Laser Radial European Championship 2015 in (Denmark) Aarhus
  - Men's Laser Winner: (Netherlands) Rutger van Schaardenburg
  - Men's Laser Radial winner: (Poland) Marcin Rudawski
  - Men's Under 21 Laser Radial winner: (Denmark) Patrick Döpping
  - Women's Laser Radial winner: (Belarus) Tatiana Drozdovskaya

== Water polo ==
=== World League ===
Men

- November 18, 2014 – June 28, 2015: 2015 FINA Men's Water Polo World League
  - November 18, 2014 – April 14, 2015: First to tenth rounds for Europe only
    - Qualified European Teams to Super Final: Hungary, Serbia, Croatia, and Italy
  - March 30 – April 4: 2015 Intercontinental Tournament for Africa, Americas, Asia & Oceania (men) in Corona del Mar, Newport Beach, California
    - Qualified International Teams to Super Final: Australia, Brazil, the United States, and China
- June 23–28: FINA Men's Water Polo World League 2015 Super Final in (Italy) Bergamo
  - Serbia defeated Croatia, 9–6, to win their ninth FINA Men's Water Polo World League title. Brazil took third place.

Women

- November 25, 2014 – June 14, 2015: 2015 FINA Women's Water Polo World League
  - November 25, 2014 – April 21, 2015: First to sixth rounds for Europe only
    - Qualified European Teams to Super Final: Italy, the Netherlands, and Spain
  - April 28 – May 3: 2015 Intercontinental Tournament for Africa, Americas, Asia & Oceania (women) in (New Zealand) Auckland
    - Qualified International Teams to Super Final: The United States, Australia, Canada, China, and Brazil
- June 9–14: FINA Women's Water Polo World League 2015 Super Final in (China) Shanghai
  - The United States defeated Australia, 8–7, to win their ninth FINA Women's Water Polo World League title. The Netherlands took third place.

=== European club competitions ===
- September 26, 2014 – May 30, 2015: 2014–15 LEN Champions League (final six in (Spain) Barcelona)
  - (Italy) Pro Recco defeated (Croatia) VK Primorje, 8–7, to win their eighth LEN Champions League title. (Spain) CN Atlètic-Barceloneta took third place.
- October 4, 2014 – April 3, 2015: 2014–15 Adriatic Water Polo League
  - (Croatia) VK Primorje defeated fellow Croatian team, VK Jug, 15–9, to win their third Adriatic Water Polo League title.
- October 30, 2014 – April 11, 2015: 2014–15 LEN Euro Cup
  - (Italy) CN Posillipo defeated fellow Italian team, AS Acquachiara, 17–16 on aggregate, to win their first LEN Euro Cup title.

=== World water polo championships ===
- August 15–23: 2015 FINA Junior Water Polo World Championships for Women in (Greece) Volos
  - The United States defeated Spain, 13–10, to win their second consecutive and fourth overall FINA Junior Water Polo World Championships for Women title. Russia took the bronze medal.
- September 4–12: 2015 FINA Junior Water Polo World Championships for Men in (Kazakhstan) Almaty
  - Serbia defeated Italy, 13–12, to win their fifth FINA Junior Water Polo World Championships title. These wins include the 1989, 2003, and 2005 world championships, when it was part of the unified Yugoslavia and Serbia and Montenegro. Hungary took the bronze medal.

=== Other water polo events ===
- January 28 – February 1: UANA American Cup 2015 in Markham, Ontario
  - Men: Canada defeated Brazil, 8–6, in the final. Argentina took third place.
  - Women: Canada defeated Brazil, 2–1, out of 3 matches played.
- May 24–29: 2015 FINA World Men's Water Polo Development Trophy in Tehran
  - Host nation, Iran, defeated Uruguay, 13–5, to win their first FINA World Men's Water Polo Development Trophy title. Austria won the bronze medal.
