= Lissi Dancefloor Disaster =

Swedish electropop group

- Origin: Sweden
- Genre: Electropop
- Years active: 2008–present
- Label: Goldenbest Records
- Members: Josefin Lindh; Johan Tilli

Lissi Dancefloor Disaster are a Swedish experimental electropop group which consists of Josefin Lindh and Johan Tilli. They were named after Johan's cat Lissi. Their debut album, Waves, was released on 27 February 2013. Johan is also a member of Swedish indie pop group Death Team. The group have been on hiatus since 2014.

== Discography ==
=== Studio albums ===
Title	Album details	Peak chart positions	Certifications
Title	Album details	SE	Certifications
Waves	Released: 27 February 2013; Label: Goldenbest; Format: CD, digital download	—	
"—" denotes items which failed to chart.

=== Singles ===
Title	Year	Peak chart positions	Album
Title	Year	SE	Album
"Oh My God"	2010	—	Lissi Dancefloor Disaster EP
"Moshpit Lovers"	2010	—	—N/a
"Kill The Winner"	2010	—	Waves
"Glowing Hearts"	2011	—	Waves
"Pop Musiiic"	2011	—	Waves
"Singing My Heart Out"	2012	—	Waves
"Try"	2013	—	Waves
"Nära Nära"	2014	—	TBA
"—" denotes releases that did not chart or were not released.

=== Extended plays ===
List of EPs, with selected details
Title	Album details
Counterpoint	Released: 2008; Formats: Digital download
Lissi Dancefloor Disaster	Released: 1 July 2009; Label: Goldenbest; Formats: Digital download
As We Plz	Released: 27 October 2011; Label: Goldenbest; Formats: Digital download

=== Music videos ===
Year	Title	Director
2010	"Oh My God"	
2010	"Moshpit Lovers"	
2011	"Glowing Hearts"	
2011	"Pop Musiiic"	
2012	"I Will Not"	
2012	"Singing My Heart Out"	
2013	"Try"	
2013	"Shy"	Jakob Möller

== See also ==
- Death Team
