= Dhoop (disambiguation) =

Dhoop is a 2003 Indian war film.

Dhoop may also refer to:

- "Dhoop" (song), a 2007 song by Aunty Disco Project off their self-titled eponymous debut album Aunty Disco Project (album)
- Dhupa, incense as used in Indian religions
- Sam Dhoop, a gymnast for Belgium at the 2022 World Games

== See also ==
- Doop (disambiguation)
- Hoop (disambiguation)
- Dhoop Chhaon (disambiguation)
