= DOP =

DOP, DoP or Dop may stand for:

== Science-related ==
- Data-oriented parsing
- Degree of parallelism
- Degree of polarization
- Delta-opioid receptor
- Dermo-optical perception
- Dilution of precision (navigation), a term used in geomatics engineering to describe the geometric strength of satellite configuration
- Dioctyl phthalate, alternate name of Bis(2-ethylhexyl) phthalate, a PVC plasticizer
- Discrete oriented polytope or polyhedron in computer graphics
- DSD over PCM, a protocol for Direct Stream Digital audio
- Paul Louis Amans Dop (1876–1954) (standard author abbreviation Dop), French botanist

== Other ==
- Declaration of Performance, a document issued by a manufacturer of a construction product required by EU regulations to attach the CE marking
- Declaration of Principles, an agreement between Israel and Palestine, also known as the Oslo Accords
- Denominazione di Origine Protetta, the Italian equivalent of protected designation of origin
- Department of Psychiatry, a type of psychiatric ward
- Dingzhou East railway station, China Railway telegraph code DOP
- Diocese of Parañaque
- Director of photography, alternative name for cinematographer
- Dolpa Airport, IATA airport code
- Dominican peso, by ISO 4217 currency code
- dOP (band), an electronic music group
- Dop (surname)
- Dumbarton Oaks Papers, an academic journal founded in 1941

== See also ==
- Doop (disambiguation)
- Dopp (disambiguation)
- dops
- Doping (disambiguation)
- Dopping (disambiguation)
