= Rope-a-dope (disambiguation) =

Rope-a-dope is a boxing strategy associated with Muhammad Ali.

Rope-a-dope may also refer to:

- Rope-A-Dope, a 1976 album by Lester Bowie
- Rope-a-Dope (Antietam album), 1994
- Ropeadope Records, an American record label
