= Opus Mixtum (album) =

Studio album by Antietam
- Released: 2008
- Studio: Seaside Lounge
- Genre: Indie rock
- Label: Carrot Top
- Producer: Josh Clark, Antietam

Antietam chronology
| Victory Park (2004) | Opus Mixtum (2008) | Tenth Life (2011) |

Opus Mixtum is an album by the American band Antietam, released in 2008. They supported it with a North American tour.

== Production ==
The album was produced by Josh Clark and the band. Its songs were recorded in two sessions, with the band originally planning a single album of instrumentals. Most of the songs were written by Tara Key and Josh Madell. Rick Rizzo, of Eleventh Dream Day, contributed on guitar. "Tierra del Fuego", the almost-10-minute album closer, incorporates elements of dub and folk. "Steel G" was influenced by Delta blues. "You/I" is a cover of the Rugbys song.

== Critical reception ==
Professional ratings
Review scores
| Source | Rating |
|---|---|
| AllMusic | 4/5 stars |
| Pitchfork | 6.4/10 |
| PopMatters | 7/10 |
| Spin | 4/5 stars |

Guitar Player said that Key "is one of the genre's unsung 6-stringers, with a style that merges post-punk harmonic nihilism with thick distortion and occasional psychedelic flourishes." The Chicago Tribune stated that she "alternates dreamlike chord progressions with furious pummeling". Spin praised Key's "husky, off-hand vocals and inventive yet precise guitar".

Pitchfork concluded, "Even at two discs, Opus Mixtum hardly overstays its welcome, but the degree of welcome it meets is likely linked to your preference for the familiar Neil Young-does-VU school of indie that ruled the underground in the 1980s." AllMusic noted, "Even with all the rock action, Antietam are too mercurial not to include other sounds, such as the immaculately jangly 'Shipshape' and deceptively spacious instrumentals like 'Steel G'." PopMatters said, "Key sounds tough and confident in the murk, with only a few syllables about attraction and desire ... escaping."

== Track listing ==
Disc 1
| No. | Title | Length |
|---|---|---|
| 1. | "Tambo Hope" |
| 2. | "RPM" |
| 3. | "Shipshape" |
| 4. | "Turn It on Me" |
| 5. | "Miss Me Bliss" |
| 6. | "King Me" |
| 7. | "I Know" |
| 8. | "Steel G" |
| 9. | "Needle and the Eye" |
| 10. | "Emphatic" |
| 11. | "1-2-1" |
| 12. | "Red Balloon Waltz" |
| 13. | "The Moor" |

Disc 2
| No. | Title | Length |
|---|---|---|
| 1. | "Hasten" |
| 2. | "It's Not About You" |
| 3. | "Pennants and Flags" |
| 4. | "The Gate Closed" |
| 5. | "On the Humble" |
| 6. | "Arrowhead Syrup" |
| 7. | "Turn the Page" |
| 8. | "That's the Way It Is" |
| 9. | "March Echo" |
| 10. | "Time Creeps" |
| 11. | "Crawl" |
| 12. | "You/I" |
| 13. | "Tierra del Fuego" |
