= Doop =

Doop may refer to:

- Doop (character), a Marvel Comics character
- D.O.O.P. or Democratic Order of Planets on the television program Futurama
- Doop (band), Dutch duo
  - "Doop" (song), 1994 song by the duo
- Fat-tailed gerbil, a small rodent sometimes called a doop

== See also ==
- DOP (disambiguation)
- Dhoop (disambiguation)
- Dopp (disambiguation)
- Doob (disambiguation)
- Dupe (disambiguation)
- Duplication (disambiguation)
