= Suicidal Since 1995 =

EP by Ängie
- Released: April 6, 2018
- Recorded: 2016–2018
- Length: 23:43
- Labels: Rich Parents; Universal
- Producer: Canto

Ängie chronology
Suicidal Since 1995 (2018)	Each Other (2019)

Singles from Suicidal Since 1995
- 1. "Dope" Released: February 2, 2018; 2. "Here for My Habits" Released: March 23, 2018

Professional ratings
Review scores
Source	Rating
Gaffa	5/6 stars

Suicidal Since 1995 is the debut EP by Swedish singer Ängie. It was released on April 6, 2018, via Rich Parents and Universal Music AB. The project was preceded by the singles "Dope" and "Here for My Habits", which dropped on February 2 and March 23, 2018, respectively.

== Background and promotion ==
After signing with Universal, Ängie released the singles "Smoke Weed Eat Pussy", "Housewive Spliffin'" and "Spun", which gained attention from the media and led her to be labeled as the "most controversial star" by The Mirror. On February 2, 2018, she announced her debut EP Suicidal Since 1995 and released "Dope" as its lead single. The music video directed by Christofer Nilsson along Ängie herself was premiered on February 14, 2018. She performed the song in a studio live session at East FM on March 8, 2018, along with the cover of "Venus in Furs", which was revealed later. The second single, "Here for My Habits" came out on March 23, 2018. A double video for "Here for My Habits" and "Venus in Furs" was released on April 24, 2018, also directed by Ängie and Christofer Nilsson.

== Composition ==
About the album's controversial themes, Ängie stated: "I don't think I'm controversial. If a dude was doing the exact thing I'm doing, there wouldn't be any fuss about it. It's because I'm a girl. Maybe I attracted attention because I have bright and playful videos about some taboo subjects. The album is a mini diary of things that have happened in the past." She also stated in an interview with HISKIND that the inspiration behind the album is based on her own life and subjects, describing the release as an "open diary". Simon Lundberg from Gaffa described the record's sound as a mix of Lana Del Rey's parables and vibrato, Uffie and Brooke Candy's rhymes, Tove Lo's poetic lyrics and Yung Lean's music.

== Track listing ==
Credits taken from Qobuz. All tracks produced by Canto.

No.	Title	Writer(s)	Length
1.	"Dope"	Angelina Dehn; Johan Tilli	3:46
2.	"Here for My Habits"	Dehn; Mats Jönsson	3:13
3.	"Boss"	Dehn; Tilli	3:08
4.	"We Run"	Dehn; Ian Boom	3:02
5.	"2013"	Dehn; Henrik Jonzon; Jönsson	3:39
6.	"Coke Ain't Brain"	Dehn; Lisa Gagerman; Hannah Stenson	2:58
7.	"Venus in Furs"	Lou Reed	3:57
Total length:			23:43

Sample credits

- "Boss" interpolates elements of the unreleased song "You Can Be The Boss" by Lana Del Rey.

== Release history ==
Region	Date	Format(s)	Label	Ref.
Various	April 6, 2018	Digital download; streaming	Rich Parents; Universal	
Various	April 21, 2018	Vinyl	Rich Parents; Universal	
