= Ängie =

Swedish pop artist (born 1995)

- Born: Angelina Dehn; 22 March 1995 (age 31); Stockholm, Sweden
- Genres: Pop; trap
- Occupations: Singer; songwriter; rapper
- Years active: 2016–present
- Labels: Rich Parents; Universal Music AB

Angelina Dehn (born 22 March 1995), better known by her stage name Ängie, is a Swedish pop and trap-hop singer.

== Early life and career ==
Dehn was born in Stockholm and grew up in the town of Nynäshamn.

She felt rejected by her friends after they learned of her first girlfriend. Dehn struggled with attention deficit hyperactivity disorder (ADHD) and mental health disorders in her adolescence and even contemplated suicide. She found relief in cannabis, saying it helped her get through her depression and get to know herself better. In 2018 she admitted that she used to be a drug addict, but has since given up on drugs, although stated in 2016 that "Weed [cannabis] is not really a drug to me. It helps so many people, with like Parkinson's, and if you feel like shit, or you're suicidal, it can help you so much. That's the reason why I started smoking. I had like so low self-esteem. I've got ADD, I'm borderline, so it really helped me focus and get to know myself."

After snapchatting clips of herself rapping to Death Team, they offered to produce her first single. She worked as a bartender, nursery teacher and window fitter before her single started getting attention. She was signed to Rich Parents AB, a division of Universal Music AB and her debut EP Suicidal Since 1995 was released in April 2018.

On 25 January 2019 she released as a single "IDGAF", described as "a bass heavy trap roller". It's the first song taken from Ängie's first studio album Everything Is Fake, set to be released as the following single.

A joint EP between Ängie and producer Harrison First called Each Other was released on 14 June 2019. A music video for the track "Bambam" directed by Ängie herself and frequent collaborator Christopher Nilsson was released on 21 June 2019, being premiered via Gaffa. The lead single of Heartburn, a joint album between Ängie and producer Tail Whip, a song called "Dust" was released on 22 November 2019 alongside its music video. The second single "Sad Sex" followed on 14 February 2020.

After the release of their collaborative EP, Ängie and Harrison First started working on a proper album. "Silver Sadness" served as the lead single and was released on 29 May 2020 along its music video, directed by Ängie herself and premiered a day before via Independent Music News. A music video for the track "Basic" was unveiled on the album's release date. It was directed by Jean-Luc Mwepu and co-directed by Ängie. The project called "Not Pushing Daisies" was released on 5 June 2020. Heartburn, on the other side, was finally released on 1 January 2021.

Ängie performed at WorldPride in August 2021.

She has said some of her inspirations include Tyler, the Creator, Lana Del Rey, Grimes and Wiz Khalifa.

== Personal life ==
Dehn is bisexual. Her Suicidal Since 1995 album has been described as "an "open diary" to detail her early life and struggles with attention deficit hyperactivity disorder, family break-ups, suicidal thoughts, drugs, depression, and living as a bisexual in a "small-minded town". Prior to her first song ("Smoke Weed Eat Pussy") she spent years experimenting with art and poetry and socialising with fellow creatives in coffee shops.

She was described in 2017 by journalist Harriet Gibsone as, "an emblem of the liberal-minded revolution that is thriving online among teenagers and people in their early 20s. She is socially motivated, serious about her social media "art" and as committed to getting high as she is to creating a sense of community among those living in small towns as she once did."

She believes the legalisation of cannabis is secondary to women's empowerment. When asked in an interview in September 2016, "Is that a message you want to get across with your music? Legalise weed?" She responded "After girl power, yeah."

== Discography ==
=== Albums ===
- Not Pushing Daisies (with Harrison First) (2020)
- Heartburn (with Tail Whip) (2021)
- follow the white rabbit (with Harrison First) (2021)
- Crocodile Tears (with Skoj) (2024)

=== EPs ===
- Suicidal Since 1995 (2018)
- Each Other (2019)

=== Singles ===
Title	Year	Album
"Smoke Weed Eat Pussy"	2016	Non-album singles
"Housewife Spliffin'"	2016	Non-album singles
"Spun"	2017	Non-album singles
"Dope"	2018	Suicidal Since 1995
"Here for My Habits"	2018	Suicidal Since 1995
"IDGAF"	2019	Non-album singles
"Ett Tag" (featuring Ambivalensen)	2019	Non-album singles
"Orgy of Enemies" (featuring Zheani)	2019	Non-album singles
"Bambam" (with Harrison First)	2019	No Pushing Daisies
"Kiss Me in Slow Motion"	2019	Non-album single
"Dust"	2019	Heartburn
"Sad Sex"	2020	Heartburn
"Silver Sadness"	2020	No Pushing Daisies
"Basic"	2020	No Pushing Daisies
"Bambam" (Luky Luke Remix with Harrison First)	2020	Non-album singles
"Drug Lullabies"	2021	Non-album singles

=== Music videos ===
Song	Year	Director	Ref
"Smoke Weed Eat Pussy"	2016	Christofer Nilsson	
"Housewife Spliffin'"	2016	Christofer Nilsson	
"Spun"	2017	Christofer Nilsson; Ängie	
"Dope"	2018	Christofer Nilsson; Ängie	
"Here for My Habits" / "Venus in Furs"	2018	Christofer Nilsson; Ängie	
"We Run"	2018	Ängie; Rasmus Wimby; Pussel	
"Bambam"	2019	Christofer Nilsson; Ängie	
"Kiss Me in Slow Motion"		Ängie	
"Dust"		Ängie; Pussel	
"Walk on the Wild Side"	2020	Ängie; Natasa	
"Silver Sadness"	2020	Ängie	
"Basic"	2020	Jean-Luc Mwepu; Ängie	
"Talk to Me Nice"	2020	Elis Lindsten	
"Bambam" (Luky Luke Remix with Harrison First)	2020	—N/a	
"Drug Lullabies"	2021	Carl Stenlöv; Ängie	
