= 2013 (song) =

Single by Primal Scream

from the album More Light
- Released: 25 March 2013
- Genre: Alternative rock, psychedelic rock, space rock krautrock, electronica
- Length: 9:01
- Label: Ignition Records
- Songwriters: Bobby Gillespie, Andrew Innes
- Producer: David Holmes

Primal Scream singles chronology
"Can't Go Back" (2008)	"2013" (2013)	"It's Alright, It's OK" (2013)

"2013" is a song by the band Primal Scream. It was released as a single on 25 March 2013 as the first single from the band's tenth album, More Light. Produced by David Holmes, the title of the song is a nod towards The Stooges' habit of naming tracks after their year of composition ("1969" in The Stooges and "1970" from Fun House). The music video directed by Rei Nadal features scenes of taxidermy, sequin gimp masks, bondage, and psychiatric patients.

== Track listing ==
Digital Download

1. "2013" - 9:01
2. "2013 (Andrew Weatherall Remix)" - 8:18
3. "2013 (Andrew Weatherall Dub)" - 7:47

== Personnel ==
=== Primal Scream ===
- Bobby Gillespie - lead vocals, percussion, keyboards
- Andrew Innes - guitar, keyboards

=== Additional personnel ===
- Kevin Shields - guitar
- Jason Faulkner - bass guitar
- Jim Hunt - saxophone
- Fred Adams - trumpet
- Davy Chegwidden - drums
