= Dhoop Chhaon =

Dhoop Chhaon (lit. 'sunshine and shade') may refer to these Indian films:

- Dhoop Chhaon (1935 film), a Hindi film
- Dhoop Chhaon (1977 film), a Hindi film

== See also ==
- Dhoop (disambiguation)
- Dhoop Mein Thandi Chaav...Maa (lit. 'Like a Cool Shade in The Sun...Mother'), an Indian Hindi-language TV series
