= Repoxygen =

Type of gene therapy

Repoxygen was the tradename for a type of gene therapy to produce erythropoietin (EPO). It was under preclinical development by Oxford Biomedica as a possible treatment for anaemia but was abandoned in 2003.

The project became infamous when it was mentioned during the criminal trial of Thomas Springstein, a former track coach for some German athletes, who was found guilty of giving athletes performance enhancing drugs without their knowledge. An email in which Springstein attempted to obtain Repoxygen was read by a prosecutor, which led to a flurry of media coverage.

The World Anti-Doping Agency banned "gene doping" in 2003 and as of 2009 was researching detection methods for substances such as repoxygen.
