= Rope-a-Dope (Antietam album) =

Studio album by Antietam
- Released: 1994
- Genre: Indie rock
- Label: Homestead
- Producer: Lyle Hysen, Antietam

Antietam chronology
Antietam Comes Alive! (1992)	Rope-a-Dope (1994)	Victory Park (2004)

Rope-a-Dope is an album by the American indie rock band Antietam, released in 1994. It is named for the boxing technique. The band supported the album with a North American tour.

== Production ==
The album was produced by Lyle Hysen and Antietam. Ira Kaplan contributed to the album's opening track, "Hands Down". Rope-a-Dope includes a cover of Dead Moon's "Graveyard".

== Critical reception ==
Professional ratings
Review scores
Source	Rating
AllMusic	4.5/5 stars
Robert Christgau	(1-star Honorable Mention)
The Encyclopedia of Popular Music	3/5 stars
Entertainment Weekly	B

Trouser Press thought that "as borne out by songs like the gently psychedelic 'Pine', [Tara] Key has settled into a wafting lower register that accentuates the spooky qualities of her voice; she's also found a way to channel some of her manic onstage attack." Entertainment Weekly deemed "Hands Down" "a wonderfully propulsive, guitar- and organ-driven bucket of noise." The Washington Post opined that "Key's piercing guitar lines are the group's trademark, yet the gentle, [Tim] Harris-sung 'Hardly Believe' has the album's most memorable tune."

Greil Marcus, in Artforum, noted that Key and Harris "can't sing," but wrote that "every time you’re about to give up on this music, Key summons a passage on her instrument that does sing." Guitar Player praised Key's "spectacularly distorted tone that's exuberantly trashy yet retains razor-edged definition."

AllMusic called the album "an unjustly overlooked piece of mid-'90s indie rock," writing that the "high point, and possibly the best thing Antietam ever did, is the 11-minute closer 'Silver Solace', which builds and ebbs with structural grace and contains some of Key's most remarkable singing and soloing."

== Track listing ==
No.	Title	Length
1.	"Hands Down"	3:31
2.	"What She Will"	5:04
3.	"Pine"	4:52
4.	"Certain Muse"	2:59
5.	"Hardly Believe"	4:34
6.	"Graveyard"	3:25
7.	"Rope-a-Dope"	2:58
8.	"Leave Home"	6:08
9.	"Betwixt"	4:27
10.	"Silver Solace"	10:39

== Personnel ==
- Tim Harris – bass, vocals
- Tara Key – guitars, vocals
- Josh Madell – drums, vocals
