= Dopp =

Dopp may refer to:

== People ==
- Daren Dopp, political staffer for Eliot Spitzer
- Hartmut Döpp (born 1947), German cross-country skier
- Heiner Dopp (born 1956), German field hockey player
- Homer Dopp (1875–1949), American politician
- Katharine Elizabeth Dopp (1863–1944), American educator
- Lincoln Jopp, British politician

== Places ==
- Dopp Hill, Town of Western, Oneida County, Central New York Region, New York State, USA; a peak
- Dopp, Wisconsin, USA; an unincorporated community in Belmont, Portage County

== Other uses ==
- Dopp kit, toiletry bag

== See also ==
- DOP (disambiguation)
- Doop (disambiguation)
- Dopping (disambiguation)
