= Stem cell doping =

Stem cell doping is the postulated practice of enhancing athletic performance through various beneficial effects of stem cells injected into the bloodstream or otherwise introduced into the body. Currently there are no documented cases of stem cell doping, but there are suspicions that the practice may already be emerging.

== See also ==
- Doping in sport
- Gene doping
- List of doping cases in sport
- Doping at the Olympic Games
- Cheating in sports
