= Villa Urquiza, Entre Ríos =

Coordinates: 31°39′S 60°22′W

Villa Urquiza (Entre Ríos)
- Municipality and village
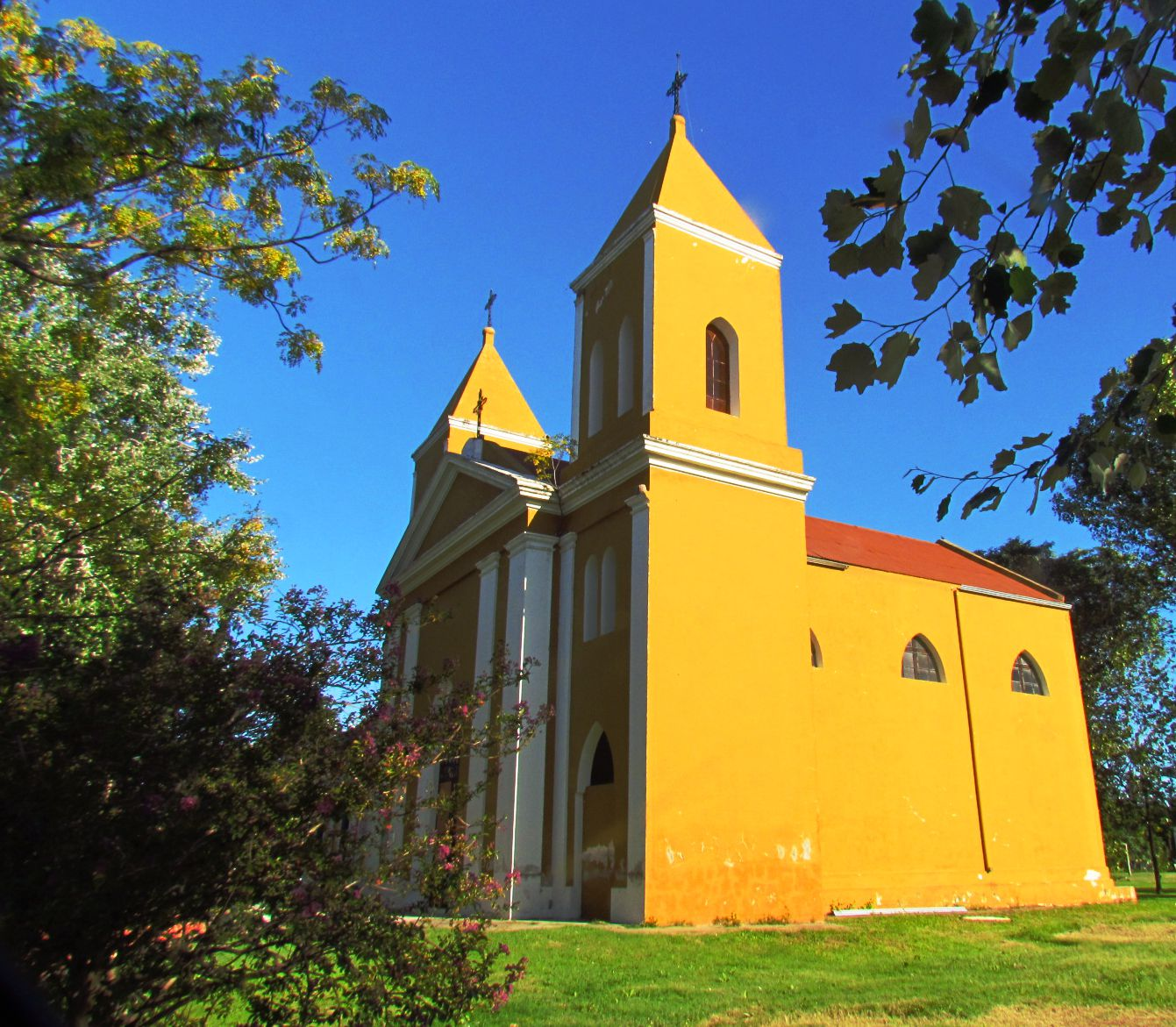
- Village chapel in Villa Urquiza
- Interactive map of Villa Urquiza (Entre Ríos)
- Country: Argentina
- Province: Entre Ríos Province
- Time zone: UTC−3 (ART)

Villa Urquiza (Entre Ríos) is a village and municipality in Entre Ríos Province in north-eastern Argentina.
