= Sniper equipment =

Rifle body, optical parts, and accessories

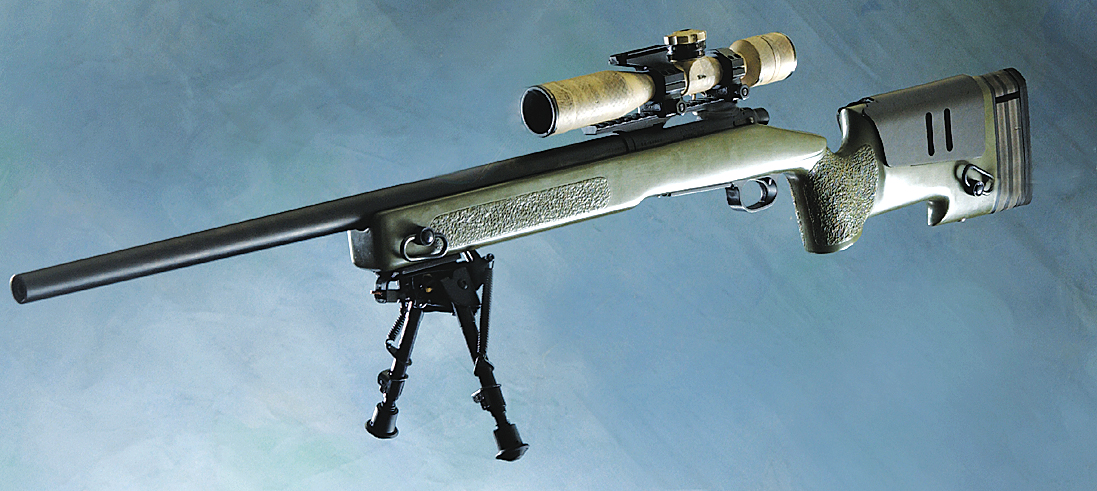
The M40A3, a bolt-action sniper rifle used by the United States Marine Corps. Introduced in 1966, the M40 was built up from a Remington 700 bolt-action rifle.

The major components of sniper equipment are the precision sniper rifle, various optical scopes and field glasses, specialized ammunition and camouflage materials for the sniper’s body and equipment. A sniper’s spotter typically also wears camouflage. In the 2010s, a spotter uses various optical gear and in some cases a laser rangefinder. Snipers may also use monopods, bipods or tripods to steady their aim.

== Sniper rifles ==
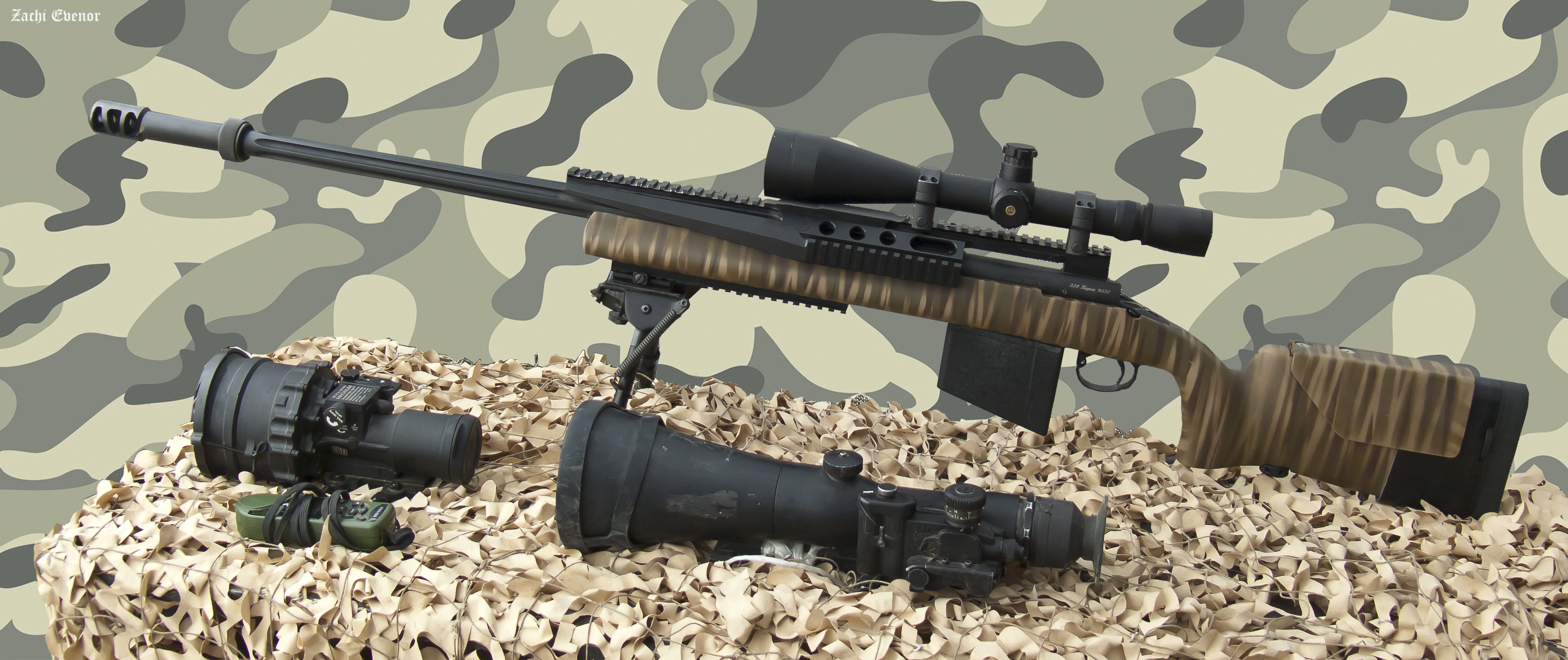
H-S Precision Pro Series 2000 HTR sniper rifle with telescopic sight and a bipod.

Historic military sniper rifles up to and including the Second World War were usually based on the standard service rifle of the country in question. They included the German Mauser Gewehr 98K, U.S. M1903 Springfield and M1 Garand, Soviet Mosin–Nagant, Norwegian Krag–Jørgensen, Japanese Arisaka, and British Lee–Enfield No. 4. Models used for sniping were generally factory tested for accuracy and fitted with specialized components, including not just optics but also such items as slings, cheek pieces, and flash eliminators, which disperse gases at the muzzle away from the sniper's view, helping avoiding having the sniper blinded by the flash.

Modern sniper rifles, from the 1960s onwards, have been increasingly purpose-built. The critical goal is reliable placement of the first shot within one MOA (minute of angle). Most include special features for this purpose, including tight building tolerances and precise components. Measures are also taken to ensure the rifle is affected as little as possible by heating, vibration and other effects which may reduce accuracy. Besides that, purpose-built sniper rifle systems often offer factory made accessories like telescopic sight mounting sets, MIL-STD-1913 rails (Picatinny rails), auxiliary iron sights for emergency use, cleaning kits, muzzle brakes/flash-hiders and sound suppressors (silencers), monopods (buttspikes), bipods, handstops, mirage bands, soft and heavy-duty transit cases and various maintenance tools. An example of a non-factory-made accessory could be shooting sticks that can be employed as rifle field rest.

Common modern sniper rifles, such as M24 and L96 are widely used by sniper teams. The importance of using anti-materiel rifle was also considered during World War II.

== Optics ==
The sniper and spotter use a wide variety of optics, such as a sniper scope and spotter weapon. Nowadays in modern warfare there have been several improvements in the field of computerized optic and manual optics. A range of devices are used to accurately mark an enemy. It has become a trend to use high caliber rifles. A telescopic sight, commonly called a scope, is an optical sighting device that is based on a refracting telescope. It is equipped with some form of graphic image pattern (a reticle) mounted in an optically appropriate position in its optical system to give an accurate aiming point. Telescopic sights are used with all types of systems that require accurate aiming but are most commonly found on firearms, particularly rifles. Other types of sights are iron sights, reflector (reflex) sights, and laser sights. The optical components may be combined with optoelectronics to form a night scope.

== Ammunition ==
Most snipers are issued with specially developed and manufactured match-grade military ammunition. This ammunition is typically manufactured to highly exacting tolerances and therefore provide improved accuracy over standard military ammunition.

This ammunition often features a boat-tail (narrowing at the base end), because it provides better ballistic performance due to the reduced air resistance (drag).

Though target shooters often assemble their own ammunition from components to more precisely control the load and tune it to the specific rifle and task, this is practically unknown in military and police circles as this may interfere with various laws.

Ideally, a shooter would acquire rounds from a single lot or batch of manufactured ammunition, zero the rifle to that lot, and then use only that ammunition until it runs out. This ensures that every bullet is as similar as possible to the previous one, and assists consistency. However, this is rarely practicable. A sniper will enter information into a Data On Previous Engagement (DOPE) book, such as lot number, temperature, wind speed/direction, humidity and altitude. If the same conditions are encountered again, the data is available to assist in making an accurate shot. Most information gathering must start over if the barrel is replaced, as each barrel has distinct characteristics.

== Camouflage ==
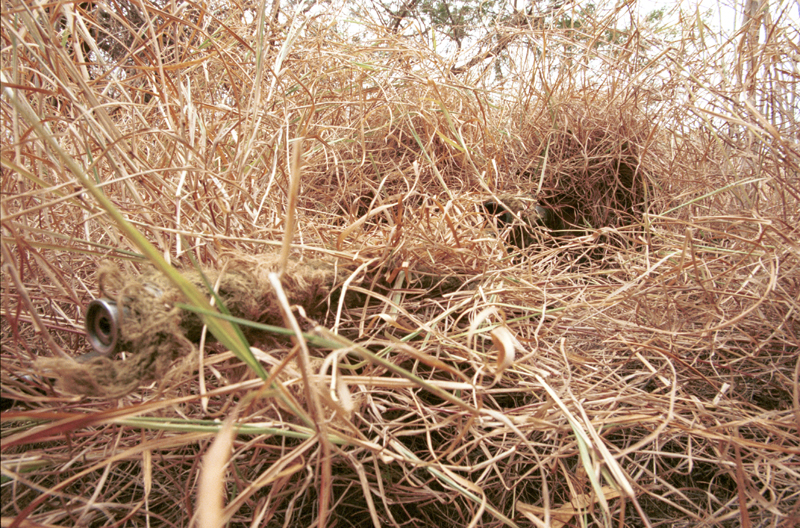
A camouflaged sniper lying prone

Snipers employ camouflage and limit their movements in order to avoid detection.

Special care has to be taken with the telescopic sight, because the front lens cannot be fully covered and is made of a highly reflective surface (normally polished glass) off which the glare of the sun can easily reflect, drawing attention to the sniper's position. Common solutions are to avoid exposure to direct sunlight by taking up a position in a shaded area or by covering the lens in non-reflective materials (some type of duct tape, fabric or metal mesh) leaving only a small slit to see through.

Snipers also have to take into account their appearance under infrared (IR) light, because many armed forces now employ thermal vision devices that work in this spectrum of light as opposed to normal night vision devices that simply gathers and intensifies normal light. Some clothes or equipment stand out when viewed with thermal vision devices and care has to be taken in selecting and covering equipment so that the sniper is not readily visible when viewed under infrared light. Clothing or equipment not readily visible under infrared light is said to have a "low IR signature". Plastic or foil "thermal blankets" can also be employed to cover a sniper and their equipment, but these, in turn, must then be camouflaged (often local foliage or material).

=== Ghillie suit ===
Snipers with extreme requirements for infiltration and camouflage use a ghillie suit. The ghillie suit was originally developed by Scottish game wardens to better count game and catch poachers.

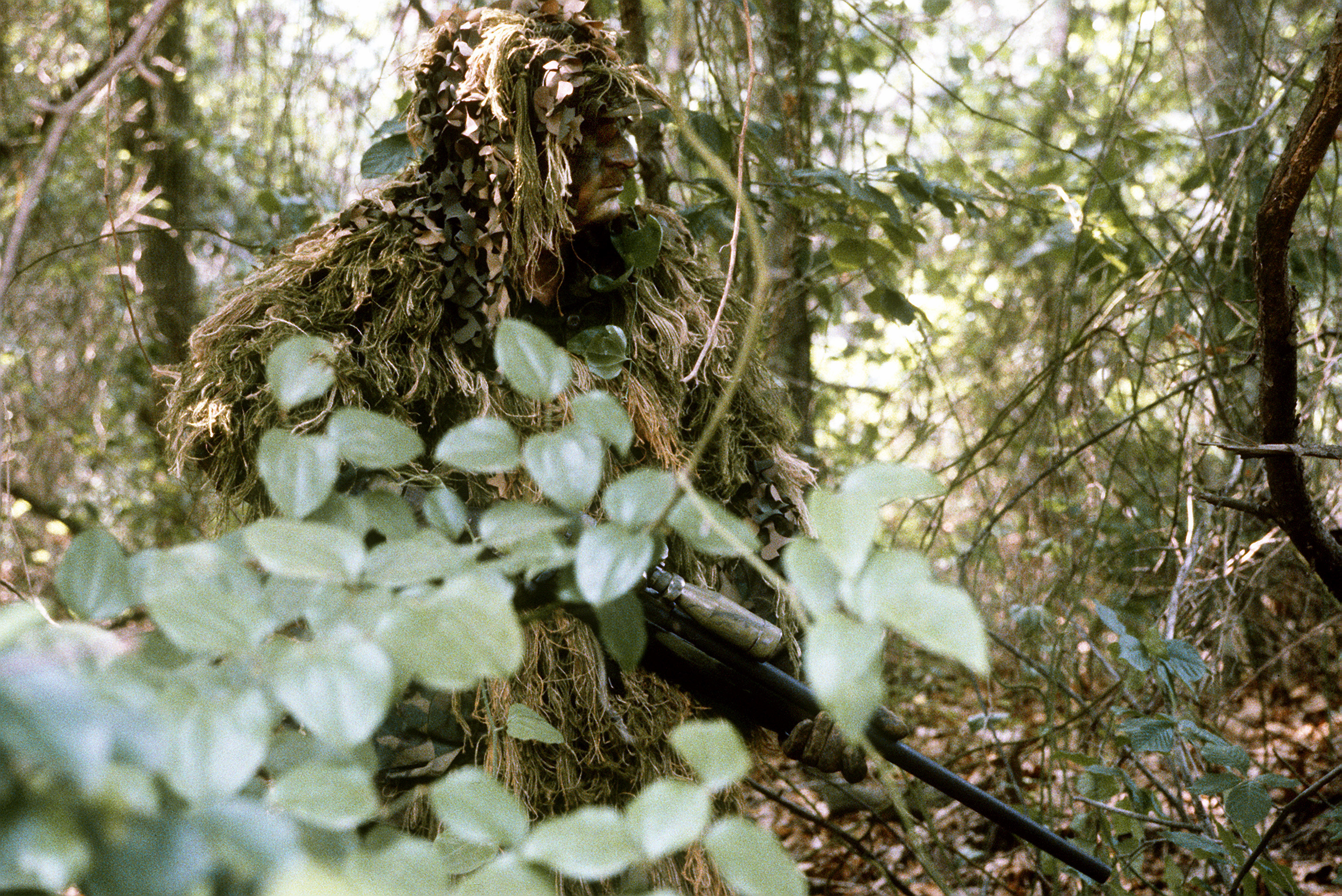
A US Marine sniper wearing a ghillie suit

Ghillie suits can be constructed in several different ways. Some services make them of rough burlap (of the hessian kind) flaps attached to a net punch. U.S. Army ghillie suits are often built using a pilot's flight suit, or some other one-piece coverall as the base. A full cover of rough webbing or fish-netting in a durable fabric is attached in irregular patterns designed to hide lines and blend in. Then, this is weathered using mud, by dragging it under or running over it with a car. When on location, as much of the local foliage as possible without restricting movement is applied to blend in. It is customary for the ghillie suit to be made by the sniper, rather than bought.

An inherent problem with ghillie suits is internal temperatures. Even in relatively moderate climates, the temperature inside of the ghillie suit can soar to over 50 °C (120 °F).

== Equipment list ==
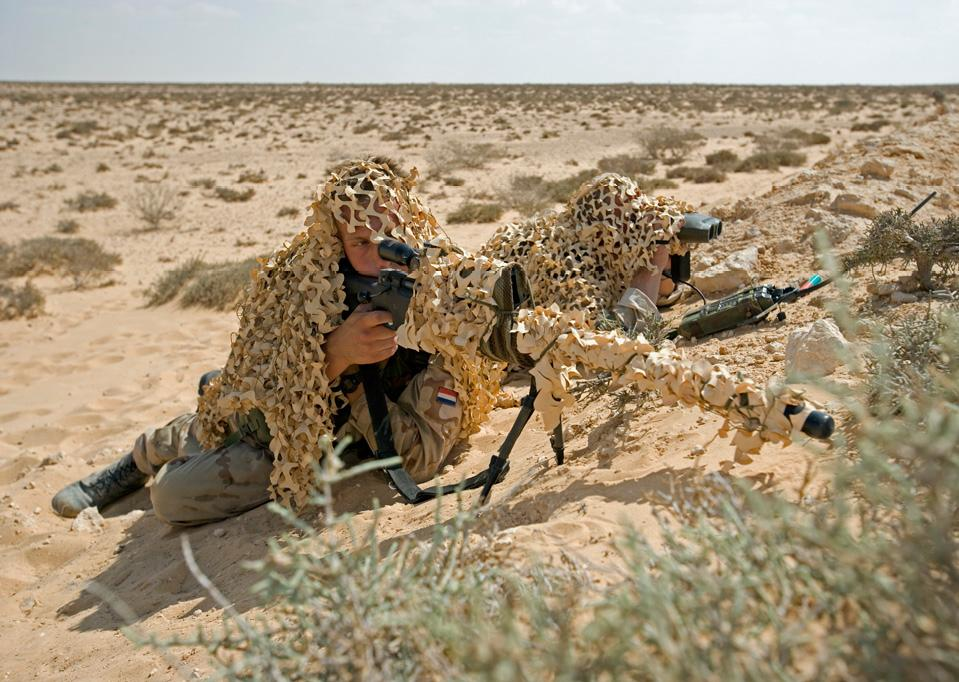
A Dutch ISAF sniper team displaying their Accuracy International AWSM .338 Lapua Magnum rifle and Leica/Vectronix VECTOR IV laser rangefinder binoculars and field radio.

Sniper gear or equipment is divided into four branches: weapons, optics, communications and navigation, and general use items.

=== Weapons equipment ===
- Sniper rifle
- Designated marksman rifle
- Specialized ammunition
- Bipod, monopod, tripod or other stand
- Hearing protection
- Extra barrel
- Semi-automatic handgun as a sidearm
- Suppressor

=== Optics ===
- Scope
- Night optics
- Binoculars
- Laser rangefinder
- Spotting scope
- Wind meter

=== Communication and navigation ===
- Handheld field radio
- Strobe light
- Map
- GPS
- Compass

=== General use items ===
- Knife
- Canteen or hydration pack
- Insect repellent
- Miniature thermometer
- Field rations
- First aid kit
- Penlight
- Tactical light with filter lenses
- Mace or pepper spray
- Camouflage facepaint
- Camouflage clothing
- Camouflage materials for rifle and equipment
- Pencil and notebook
