= Death Team =

Swedish indie pop group

- Origin: Sweden
- Genres: Indie pop, Hip hop
- Years active: 2014–present
- Labels: Cow-Pow Studios, Warner Bros Records
- Members: Maja Edelbring; Johen Rafael Tilli
- Website: deathteam.se

Death Team is a Swedish indie pop group which consists of Mayka (born Maja Edelbring) and Johen Rafael Tilli. They have released a number of singles and an EP.

== Career ==
Maja has a background in DJing under her stage name Mayka while Tilli has worked as a film animator and also previously featured in the duo Lissi Dancefloor Disaster. Their debut single, "Shake it Off", was released in May 2014. Their second single, "Fucking Bitches In The Hood", was premiered on the Vice website Noisey on 8 December 2014. It was supported by a video shot in a Canadian bowling alley that was released on 21 February 2015. Their third single, "Dolphin Style", was released on 8 May 2015, and coincided with their self-created Dolphin Awareness Day, made to raise awareness about dolphins in captivity.

In November 2015 the American music magazine Spin picked "Fucking Bitches In The Hood" as the 9th best song of 2015 writing that it's "the most perfectly WTF rap verse of 2015".

In 2016 they performed shows around Europe while working on their debut EP In January 2016 they announced on Facebook that they are starting a record label called Rich Parents. The label has since signed acts such as Ängie and Alexander Wilde. In June of that year they released the single "Jump".

On 20 September 2016, the band released their first EP, titled "Death Team Loves You'. It was followed by the single "Messed Up".

In 2017 they released the singles "Work" and "Weekend".

The band has been on hiatus since 2017, while Maja focuses on her solo career.

== Central concepts of Death Team ==
Death Team focuses a lot on some recurring subjects in their interviews, music and presence on social media: dolphins, veganism, money, girl power, yoga, pop culture, the music business, pop music, nail polish, Internet as of the 90s, the joy of creating music and Paris Hilton.

== Discography ==
=== Extended plays ===
List of EPs, with selected details
Title	Album details
Death Team Loves You	Released: 20 September 2016; Label: Cow-Pow, Warner; Formats: Digital download

=== Singles ===
Title	Year	Peak chart positions	Album
Title	Year	SE Heat	Album
"Shake It Off"	2014	—	TBA
"Fucking Bitches in the Hood"	2015	8	TBA
"Dolphin Style"	2015	—	TBA
"So Fresh"	2015	—	TBA
"Gold"	2015	—	TBA
"Jump"	2016	—	TBA
"Messed Up"	2016	—	TBA
"Work"	2017	—	TBA
"Weekend"	2017	—	TBA
"—" denotes releases that did not chart or were not released.

=== Music videos ===
Year	Title	Director
2015	"Fucking Bitches In The Hood"	Mark Zibert
2015	"So Fresh"	Henrik Edelbring
2015	"Gold"	
2016	"Messed Up"	Kristoffer Jansson
2017	"Weekend"	

== See also ==
- Ängie - Swedish pop artist discovered by Death Team
