= Alpha-actinin-3 =

Mammalian protein found in Homo sapiens

ACTN3
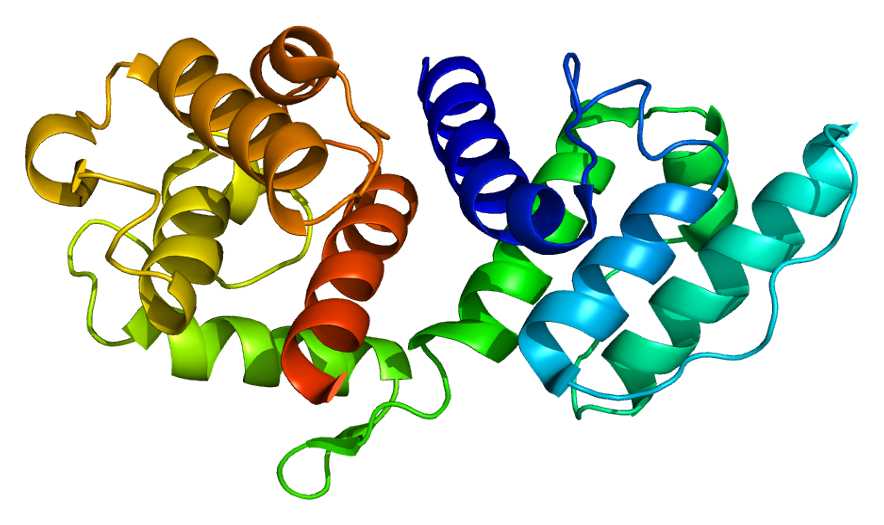

Identifiers
- Aliases: ACTN3, actinin alpha 3 (gene/pseudogene), ACTN3D, actinin alpha 3
- External IDs: OMIM: 102574; MGI: 99678; GeneCards: ACTN3
Available structures
PDB	Ortholog search: PDBe RCSB
PDB	List of PDB id codes 1TJT, 1WKU, 3LUE

Gene location (Human)
Chr.	Chromosome 11 (human)
Band	11q13.2	Start	66,546,395 bp
Band	11q13.2	End	66,563,334 bp

Gene location (Mouse)
Chr.	Chromosome 19 (mouse)
Band	19 A|19 4.12 cM	Start	4,911,244 bp
Band	19 A|19 4.12 cM	End	4,927,937 bp
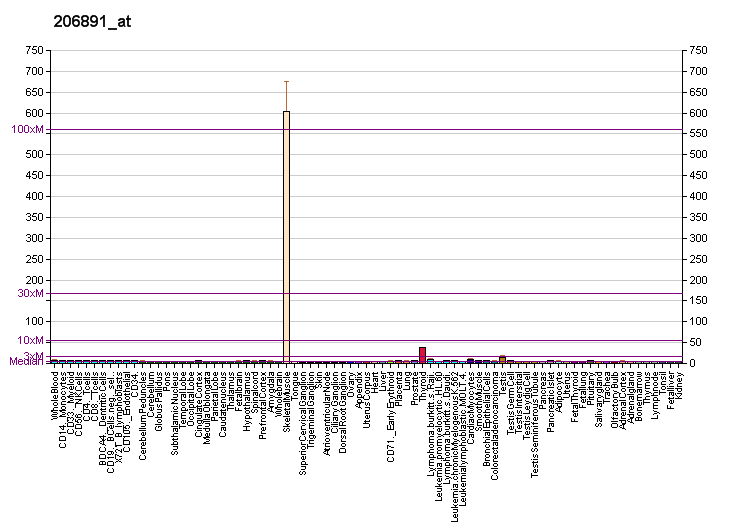
RNA expression pattern
Bgee	Human / Mouse (ortholog); Top expressed in: Skeletal muscle tissue of rectus abdominis; Skeletal muscle tissue of biceps brachii; thoracic diaphragm; vastus lateralis muscle; muscle of thigh; gastrocnemius muscle; triceps brachii muscle; deltoid muscle; tibialis anterior muscle; glutes / Top expressed in: triceps brachii muscle; sternocleidomastoid muscle; temporal muscle; vastus lateralis muscle; medial head of gastrocnemius muscle; extensor digitorum longus muscle; tibialis anterior muscle; ankle; muscle of thigh; plantaris muscle; More reference expression data
BioGPS	More reference expression data
Gene ontology
Molecular function	calcium ion binding; protein homodimerization activity; transmembrane transporter binding; metal ion binding; integrin binding; protein binding; actin binding; structural constituent of muscle
Cellular component	cytosol; pseudopodium; focal adhesion; intracellular anatomical structure; actin filament; extracellular exosome
Biological process	regulation of apoptotic process; regulation of aerobic respiration; negative regulation of glycolytic process; negative regulation of calcineurin-NFAT signaling cascade; transition between fast and slow fiber; positive regulation of glucose catabolic process to lactate via pyruvate; focal adhesion assembly; muscle filament sliding; skeletal muscle atrophy; response to denervation involved in regulation of muscle adaptation; negative regulation of oxidative phosphorylation; positive regulation of skeletal muscle tissue growth; regulation of the force of skeletal muscle contraction; negative regulation of cold-induced thermogenesis
Sources:Amigo / QuickGO
Orthologs
Databases	NCBI: entry; OMA: entry
Species	Human	Mouse
Entrez	89	11474
Ensembl	ENSG00000248746	ENSMUSG00000006457
UniProt	Q08043	O88990
RefSeq (mRNA)	NM_001104; NM_001258371	NM_013456
RefSeq (protein)	NP_001095; NP_001245300	NP_038484
Location (UCSC)	Chr 11: 66.55 – 66.56 Mb	Chr 19: 4.91 – 4.93 Mb
PubMed search
- Wikidata
View/Edit Human	View/Edit Mouse

Alpha-actinin-3, also known as alpha-actinin skeletal muscle isoform 3 or F-actin cross-linking protein, is a protein that in humans is encoded by the ACTN3 gene (named sprinter gene, speed gene or athlete gene) located on chromosome 11. All people have two copies (alleles) of this gene.

Alpha-actinin is an actin-binding protein with multiple roles in different cell types. This gene expression is limited to skeletal muscle. It is localized to the Z-disc and analogous dense bodies, where it helps to anchor the myofibrillar actin filaments.

== Fast versus slow twitch muscle fibers ==
Skeletal muscle is composed of long cylindrical cells called muscle fibers. There are two types of muscle fibers, slow twitch or muscle contraction (type I) and fast twitch (type II). Slow twitch fibers are more efficient in using oxygen to generate energy, while fast twitch fibers are less efficient. However, fast twitch fibers fire more rapidly, allowing them to generate more power than slow twitch (type I) fibers. Fast twitch fibers and slow twitch fibers are also called white muscle fibers and red muscles fibers, respectively. The alpha-actinin-3 protein is found in type II muscle fibers.

== Alleles ==
An allele (rs1815739; 577X) has been identified in the ACTN3 gene which results in a deficiency of alpha-actinin-3 in the individuals. The X homozygous genotype (ACTN3 577XX) is caused by a C to T transition in exon 16 of the ACTN3 gene, which causes a transformation of an arginine base (R) to a premature stop codon (X) resulting in the rs1815739 mutation causing no production of the alpha-actinin 3 protein in muscle fibers. The 577XX polymorphism causes no production of alpha-actinin 3 protein which is essential in fast twitch muscle fibers.

It has been speculated that variations in this gene evolved to accommodate the energy expenditure requirements of people in various parts of the world. Over 75% of the persons have one or two copies of ACTN3 577R and have alpha-actinin-3. Homozygous individuals (ACTN3 577XX) have no alpha-actinin-3 (16%-20% of the population), but they have a high level of alpha-actinin-2.

=== Athletes ===
There is an association between the ACTN3 R577X polymorphism in sprint and powerlifting performance at an elite level (RR and RX variants are better), and appears to be an association with exercise recovery and lower injury risk. It appears that the XX genotype is associated with higher levels of muscle damage and a longer time required for recovery.

== Interactions ==
ACTN3 has been shown to interact with alpha-actinin-2.

== See also ==
- Actinin
