= Dopey (podcast) =

- Genre: Substance use
- Language: English

Cast and voices
- Hosted by: Dave (current); Chris (deceased)

Publication
- Original release: January 2016

Related
- Website: www.dopeypodcast.com

Dopey is an American self-help and comedy podcast about personal experiences of substance use and addiction. The show is hosted by Dave Manheim, a person recovering from Substance Use Disorder, based in New York City, and was formerly co-hosted by Chris, a fellow person in recovery and graduate student from Boston, Massachusetts. The show has been described as being about "drugs, addiction, and dumb shit."

Initially conceived as a show about the humorous side of addiction, specifically excluding stories about recovery, the focus has changed over time, especially following Chris' relapse and overdose death in July 2018. As of 2019, Dave hosts the show alone, with occasional celebrity guests, notably Jamie Lee Curtis, Dr. Drew, Brandon Novak, Fentanyl Jay, Ray Brown, Brian "Hottwheels" Connolly, Carolyn “Mountain Girl” Garcia, and Billy Strings.

== History ==
Dave and Chris first met at a drug rehabilitation center in Connecticut in March 2011. At the time of the show's debut in January 2016, Dave had less than six months of sobriety, and Chris less than two years. (Note: According to Vice, Dave had five months of sobriety, and Chris two years; The Fix states Dave had three months and Chris a year and a half.) Dave worked at a Jewish deli in Manhattan, while Chris managed a sober living facility while studying for postgraduate degrees in psychology. Both were users of heroin as well as other drugs, and had numerous relapses between them.

The show's edgy humor and rambling tone was inspired by The Howard Stern Show, and focused on sharing misadventures and "war stories" from their own drug histories and those of listeners. Dave and Chris explicitly avoided recovery stories, which they considered boring. As the show grew in popularity, it reached 40,000 monthly downloads and a fan base they termed "Dopey Nation". Guests included celebrity doctor Drew Pinsky, WTF creator, actor, and comedian Marc Maron, Andy Dick, comedian Artie Lange, and rock musician Steven Adler of Guns N' Roses.

In July 2018, Dave announced on Dopey that Chris had relapsed and died of a drug overdose. In the months prior, he had been injured while on vacation with his girlfriend, was prescribed painkillers, and soon was again taking heroin and other substances. During the podcast's 100th episode, Chris had jokingly speculated about one possible way the show could end: "One of us will get injured and get pain meds and take them while doing Dopey." Vice described the remark as "eerie and foreshadowing" to hear after his death. Dave has continued the podcast as a solo project and has no plans to find a new co-host. On February 1, 2019, Dopey was the subject of a segment on an episode of This American Life.

As of February 24, 2023, the podcast achieved the following milestones: 400th consecutive weekly episode, and over 9 million downloads.
