= Kevin Shields discography =

Irish musician, songwriter, composer, and producer

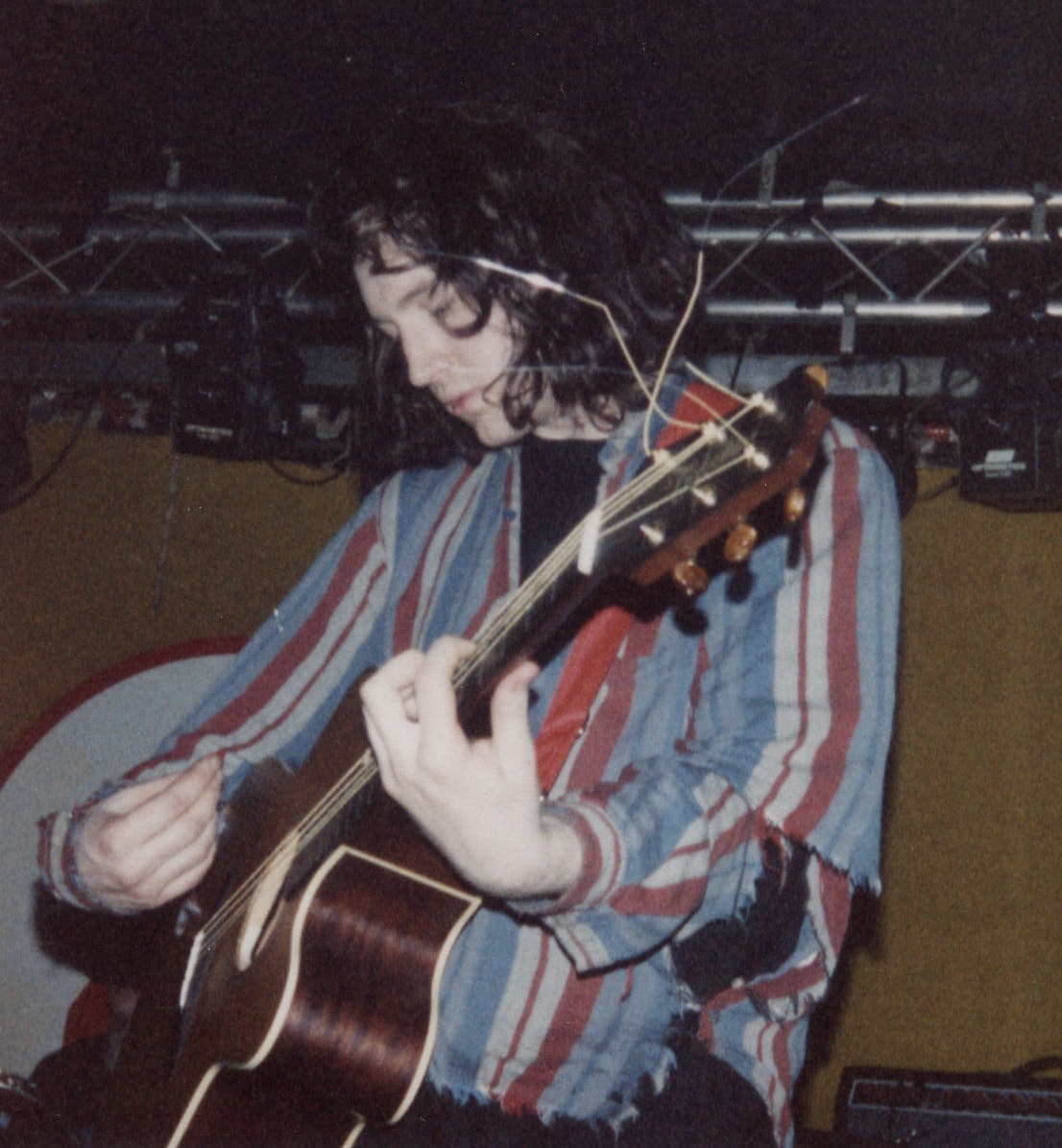
Kevin Shields performing with My Bloody Valentine in 1989

Kevin Shields is an Irish musician, singer-songwriter, composer, and producer who has released one collaborative album and scored the film Lost in Translation, in addition to a prolific career as a producer and mixer. He began performing in the late 1970s and formed the Dublin-based punk rock band The Complex with drummer Colm Ó Cíosóig and guitarist Liam Ó Maonlaí. Following Ó Maonlaí's departure, Shields and Ó Cíosóig recruited vocalist David Conway and formed a new band, My Bloody Valentine, in 1983.

After a number of minor mini-album/EPs and singles, the band released their first two full-length studio albums, Isn't Anything (1988) and Loveless (1991)—both of which pioneered an alternative rock subgenre known as shoegazing. During this time, Shields created a guitar technique known as "glide guitar", which includes extensive use of the tremolo arm while strumming and features reverse reverb sourced from his Yamaha SPX90 processing unit.

Following My Bloody Valentine's disbandment in 1997, Shields began a career as a producer and mixer, with a number of artists, including Yo La Tengo, Dinosaur Jr., The Go! Team, The Pastels, Le Volume Courbe and Spacemen 3. He co-produced and contributed guitar to two Primal Scream albums, XTRMNTR (2000) and Evil Heat (2002), and became a touring member of the band between 1996 and 2006. During this time, Shields composed music for the Canadian contemporary dance group La La La Human Steps and recorded four songs for Sofia Coppola's 2003 film Lost in Translation—which earned him nominations for a British Academy of Film and Television Arts (BAFTA) award for Best Film Music, an Irish Film and Television Academy (IFTA) award for Best Music in a Film, and an Online Film Critics Society award for Best Original Score. In 2008, Shields released The Coral Sea, a collaborative live album with Patti Smith, on which he provided musical accompaniment to Smith's reading of her book of the same name.

== Collaboration album ==
Title	Album details
The Coral Sea (with Patti Smith)	Released: 7 July 2008; Label: PASK (001); Formats: 2×CD, DD

== Singles ==
Year	Single	Album	Ref
2003	"City Girl"	Lost in Translation: Original Soundtrack	
2017	"Only Once Away My Son" (with Brian Eno)	N/A	
2018	"The Weight of History" (with Brian Eno)	N/A	

== Contributions ==
List of solo contributions to compilations and soundtracks
Year	Song(s)	Album	Ref
2001	"Outro"	Geographic Compilation	
2003	"City Girl" "Goodbye" "Ikebana" "Are You Awake?"	Lost in Translation: Original Soundtrack	

== Guest appearances ==
List of guest appearances
Year	Album	Artist	Ref
1996	Strange Familiar	Russell Mills & Undark	
1996	Beyond the Pale	Experimental Audio Research	
1997	The Köner Experiment	Experimental Audio Research	
1997	Hand It Over	Dinosaur Jr.	
1999	Subliminal Minded	DJ Spooky	
1999	Afterglow	Dot Allison	
2000	XTRMNTR	Primal Scream	
2000	More Light	J Mascis + The Fog	
2001	Gift	Curve	
2001	Ear-Bleeding Country: The Best of Dinosaur Jr.	Dinosaur Jr.	
2001	Know Your Enemy	Manic Street Preachers	
2002	Evil Heat	Primal Scream	
2003	Live in Japan	Primal Scream	
2006	I Killed My Best Friend	Le Volume Courbe	
2008	The Hollow of Morning	Gemma Hayes	
2010	Wake Up the Nation	Paul Weller	
2013	More Light	Primal Scream	
2014	Auto Music	Brian Reitzell	

== Production ==
=== Producing ===
List of producing work
Year	Album	Artist	Ref
1991	"How Do You Do It?"	The Impossibles	
1995	Appeal to Human Greed	God	
1997	Hand It Over	Dinosaur Jr.	
1998	Kicking a Dead Pig	Mogwai	
1999	Afterglow	Dot Allison	
2000	More Light	J Mascis + The Fog	
2001	Ear-Bleeding Country: The Best of Dinosaur Jr.	Dinosaur Jr.	
2002	Evil Heat	Primal Scream	
2003	The John Peel Sessions	J Mascis	
2004	American Whip	Joy Zipper	
2005	Blackrays Defence	The Beat Up	

=== Mixing ===
List of mixing work
Year	Album	Artist	Ref
1997	Unfair Kind of Fame	The Pastels	
1997	Autumn Sweater	Yo La Tengo	
1998	"No Flies on Frank"	Damian O'Neill	
1998	Kicking a Dead Pig	Mogwai	
1998	Illuminati	The Pastels	
1999	Only The Strongest Will Survive	Hurricane #1	
2000	XTRMNTR	Primal Scream	
2000	"Accelerator"	Primal Scream	
2003	Live in Japan	Primal Scream	
2003	The John Peel Sessions	J Mascis	
2004	Thunder, Lightning, Strike	The Go! Team	
2004	American Whip	Joy Zipper	
2005	Blackrays Defence	The Beat Up	
2005	"Ladyflash"	The Go! Team	
2006	Marie Antoinette	Bow Wow Wow	
2010	All Rise	Wounded Knees	
2023	House of Cards	Eyedress	

=== Remixes ===
List of remixes
Year	Song	Artist
1996	"Londinium (Kevin Shields Mix)"	Archive
1997	"Autumn Sweater (Kevin Shields Mix)"	Yo La Tengo
1997	"Cycle (My Bloody Valentine Remix)"	The Pastels
1998	"Magic Nights (My Bloody Valentine Remix)"	The Pastels
1998	"La Piscine (My Bloody Valentine Mix)"	The Little Rabbits
1998	"If They Move Kill 'Em (My Bloody Valentine Arkestra)"	Primal Scream
1998	"Mogwai Fear Satan (My Bloody Valentine Remix)"	Mogwai
1998	"Coming Up Roses (Kevin Shields Mix)"	Curve
1998	"Pure Morning (M B V Remix)"	Placebo
1998	"Rising Sign (My Bloody Valentine Mix)"	Hurricane #1
1999	"Sweetness And Light (The Orange Squash Mix)"	Lush
2000	"Take Me Through This Life (Remixed By Kevin Shields)"	The Frank and Walters
2004	"Sinc (Kevin Shields Mix)"	Mercedes
2005	"Thunder, Lightning, Strike - Kevin Shields Mix"	The Go! Team
2005	"Huddle Flash (Kevin Shields Vs. The Go! Team)"	The Go! Team
2006	"I Want Candy (Kevin Shields Remix)"	Bow Wow Wow
2006	"Fools Rush In (Kevin Shields Remix)"	Bow Wow Wow
2010	"Living Room (Kevin Shields Remix)"	David Holmes Featuring Carl Hancock Rux
2016	"Get Over You (Kevin Shields 2016 Remix)"	The Undertones
2023	"House Of Cards (Kevin Shields Rainbow Belts Remix)"	Eyedress

== See also ==
- My Bloody Valentine discography
