= Honchō, Tokyo =

District in Nakano, Tokyo, Japan

Honchō 本町
- Neighborhood in Nakano
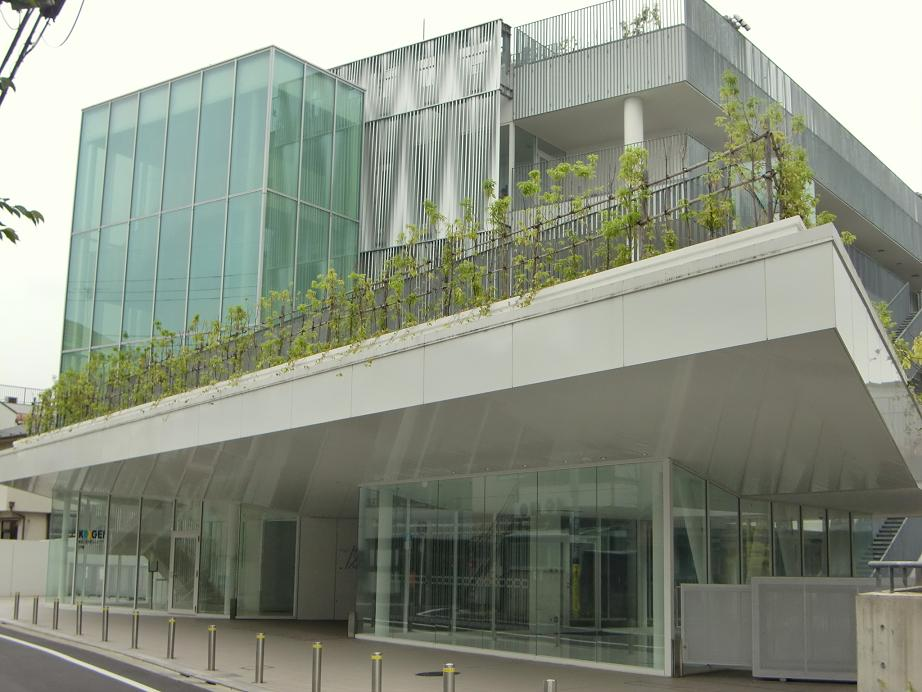
- Tokyo Polytechnic University Nakano Campus
- Interactive map of Honchō
- Coordinates: 35.696°N 139.672°E
- Country: Japan
- Prefecture: Tokyo
- Special ward: Nakano

Population (1 October 2020)
  - Total: 29,587
- Time zone: UTC+09:00
- ZIP code: 164-0012
- Telephone area code: 03

Honchō (本町) is a district of Nakano, Tokyo, Japan. The current administrative names are Honcho 1-chome to Honcho 6-chome. As of October 2020, the population of this district is 29,587. The postal code for Honchō is 164-0012.

== Geography ==
Honchō borders Chūō in the north, Nishi-Shinjuku to the east, Yayoichō to the south, and Wada to the west.

== Education ==
Nakano City Board of Education (中野区教育委員会) operates public elementary and junior high schools.

Schools in Honcho:

- Nakano City Daini (No. 2) Junior High School (中野区立第二中学校)
- Nakano City Hongō Elementary School (中野区立中野本郷小学校)

Honcho 1-3 chome are zoned to Nakano No. 1 Elementary School (中野第一小学校). 4-6 chome are zoned to Hongō Elementary. All parts of Nakano are zoned to No. 2 Junior High.

Tokyo Polytechnic University’s (東京工芸大学) headquarters and Faculty of Arts are located in the Honchō district.

== Sights ==
- Jōgan-ji (Nakano, Tokyo) (成願寺), filming location of the 2003 film Lost in Translation
