= City Girl =

City Girl may refer to:

- City Girl (1930 film), a silent film directed by F.W. Murnau
- City Girl (1938 film), starring Ricardo Cortez and Phyllis Brooks
- City Girl (1984 film), directed by Martha Coolidge
- "City Girl" (song), by Kevin Shields
- "City Girl", German hit song by Peter Orloff
- City Girls, female rap duo
- "City Girls", a song by Chris Brown and Young Thug.
