= Shoot Speed – More Dirty Hits =

Compilation album by Primal Scream
- Released: 17 March 2004
- Recorded: 1985–2003
- Length: 79:16
- Label: Columbia

Primal Scream chronology
Dirty Hits (2003)	Shoot Speed – More Dirty Hits (2004)	Live in Japan (2004)

Shoot Speed – More Dirty Hits is a compilation album by Scottish rock band Primal Scream, released in Japan on 17 March 2004 by Columbia Records. The album attempts to compile and collect significant singles, album tracks, B-sides and remixes not released on the greatest hits album Dirty Hits (2003), and also acts as a B-sides compilation. Unlike its predecessor, Shoot Speed features music from Primal Scream's entire career, collecting tracks released before their third studio album Screamadelica (1991).

The album peaked at number 48 on the Oricon album chart in Japan.

== Track listing ==
All tracks are written by Bobby Gillespie, Andrew Innes and Robert Young; except where indicated

No.	Title	Writer(s)	Length
1.	"When The Kingdom Comes" (2000 single "Accelerator" B-side)	Gillespie, Innes	4:20
2.	"Star" (1997 album Vanishing Point)	Martin Duffy, Gillespie, Innes, Young	4:25
3.	"Velocity Girl" (1986 single "Crystal Crescent" B-side)	Gillespie	1:22
4.	"Ivy Ivy Ivy" (1989 album Primal Scream)		3:04
5.	"City" (2002 album Evil Heat)	Gillespie, Innes	3:22
6.	"Don't Fight It Feel It (7" edit)" (1991 album Screamadelica)		4:06
7.	"Medication" (1997 album Vanishing Point)	Gillespie, Innes	3:53
8.	"All Fall Down" (1985 single "All Fall Down" A-side)	Beattie, Gillespie	2:10
9.	"Come Together (Terry Farley Mix)" (1990 single "Come Together")		4:22
10.	"Screamadelica" (1992 single "Dixie-Narco EP" B-side)		10:41
11.	"So Sad About Us" (1987 single "Imperial" B-side, Who cover)	Pete Townshend	4:10
12.	"Revenge Of Hammond Connection" (2000 single "Kill All Hippies" B-side)	Primal Scream	3:32
13.	"I'm Losing More Than I'll Ever Have" (1989 album Primal Scream)		5:09
14.	"Gentle Tuesday" (1987 album Sonic Flower Groove)	Beattie, Gillespie	3:46
15.	"MBV Arkestra (If They Move Kill 'Em)" (2000 album XTRMNTR)	Primal Scream	6:42
16.	"Darklands" (1998 single "If They Move Kill 'Em" B-side)	Jim Reid, William Reid	6:10
17.	"Imperial" (1987 album Sonic Flower Groove)	Beattie, Gillespie	3:36
18.	"Jesus" (1997 single "Star" B-side)		4:27
