= Jōgan-ji (Nakano, Tokyo) =

Building in Tokyo, Japan

Coordinates: 35°41′39″N 139°40′54″E

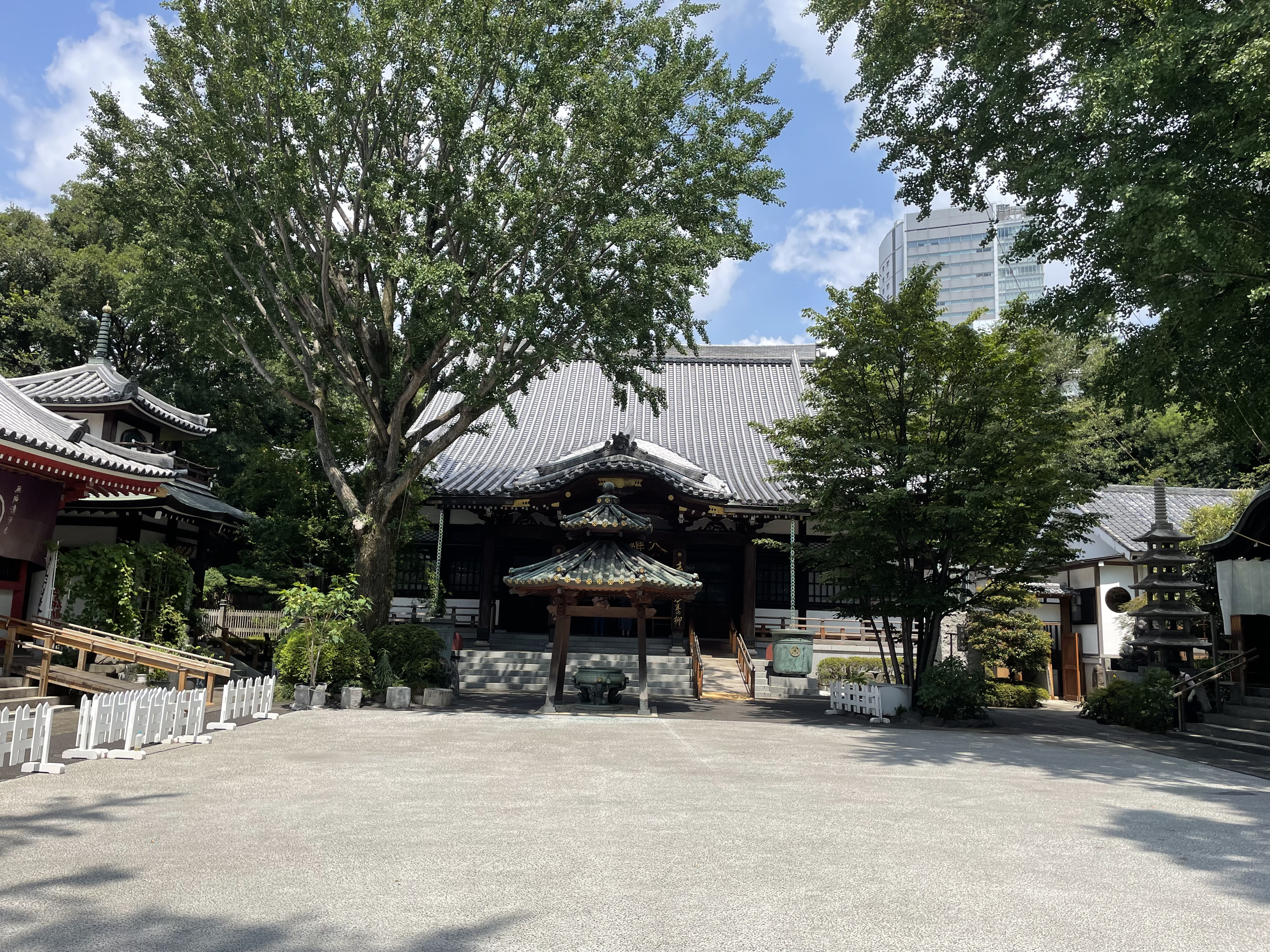
Main hall of Jōgan-ji

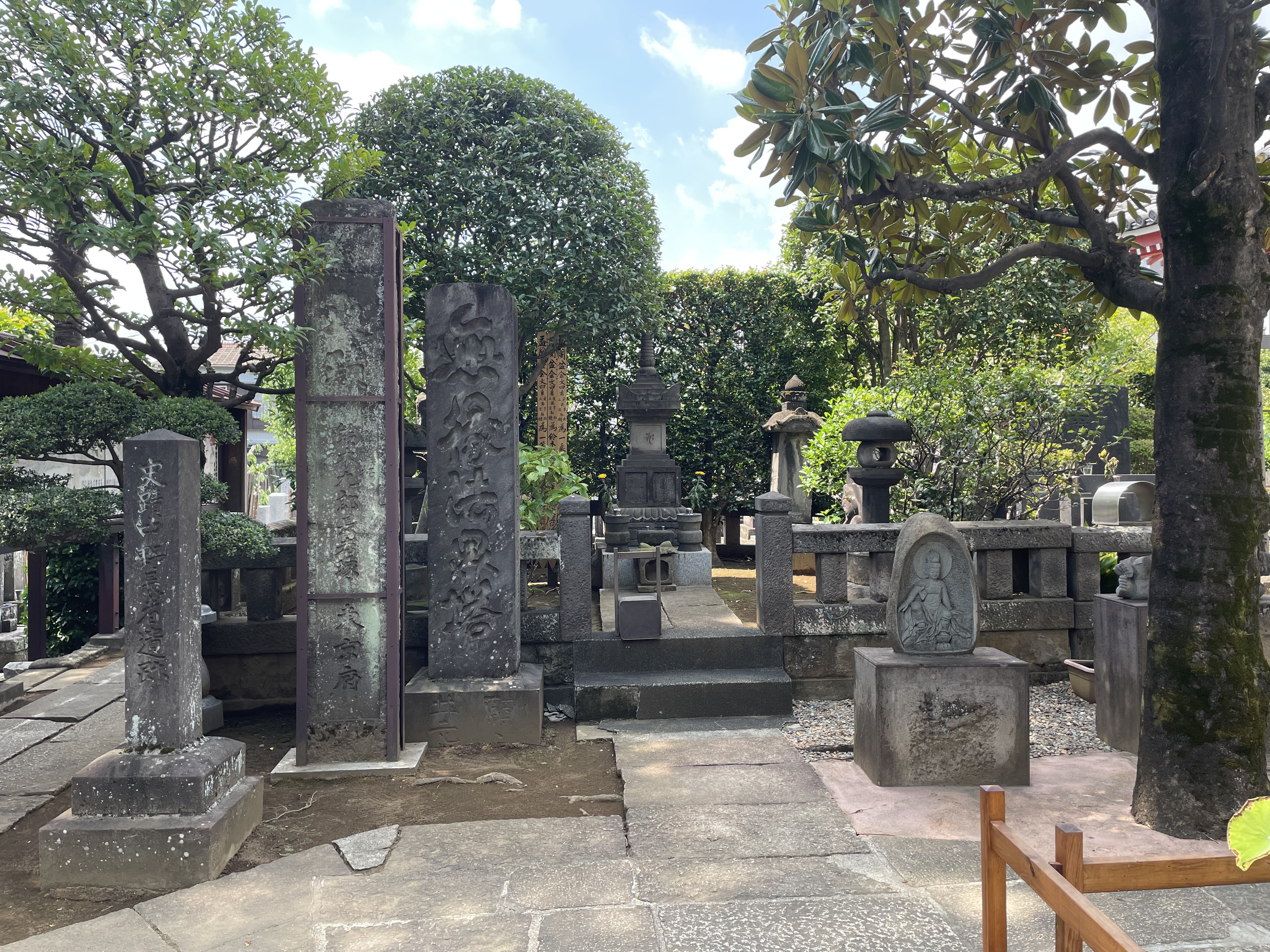
Cemetery of Jōgan-ji

Jōgan-ji (成願寺) is a Buddhist temple located in Honchō, Nakano, Tokyo, Japan.

It was a filming location of the 2003 movie Lost in Translation.
