= Chūō, Nakano, Tokyo =

District in Nakano, Tokyo, Japan

Chūō 中央
- Neighborhood in Nakano
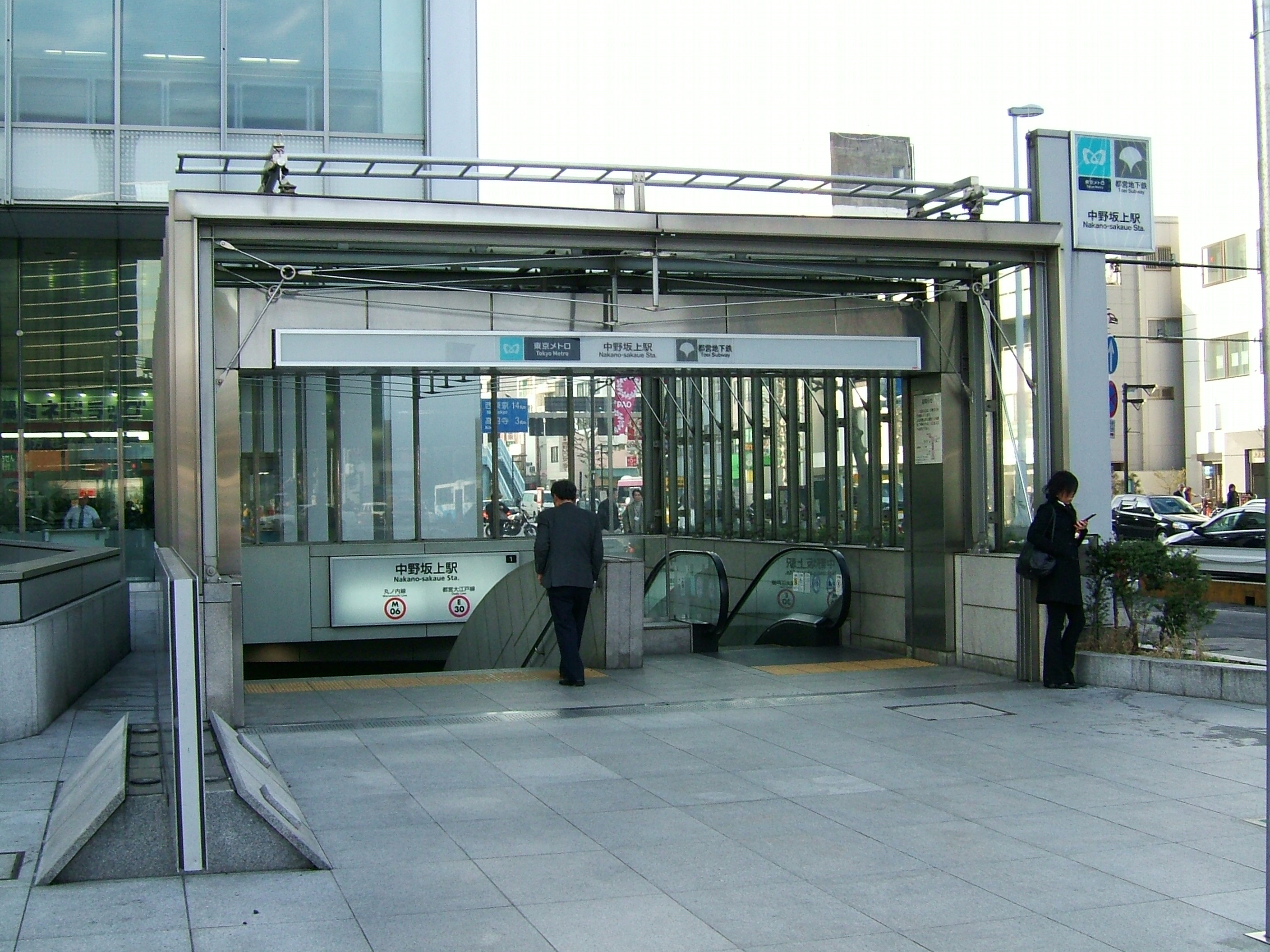
- Nakano-sakaue Station
- Interactive map of Chūō
- Coordinates: 35°41′59″N 139°40′30″E
- Country: Japan
- Prefecture: Tokyo
- Special ward: Nakano

Population (1 October 2020)
  - Total: 29,541
- Time zone: UTC+09:00
- ZIP code: 164-0011
- Telephone area code: 03

Chūō (中央) is a district of Nakano, Tokyo, Japan.

As of October 2020, the population of this district is 29,541. The postal code for Chūō is 164–0011.

== Geography ==
Chūō borders Higashinakano and Nakano in the north, Kitashinjuku to the east, Honchō to the south, and Kōenji to the west.

== Education ==
Nakano City Board of Education (中野区教育委員会) operates public elementary and junior high schools.

Schools in Chuo:

- Tōnoyama Elementary School (塔山小学校)
- Tōka Elementary School (桃花小学校)

Chuo 1-chome is zoned to Tōnoyama. 4 and 5-chome are zoned to Tōka. 3-chome is zoned to Yato Elementary School (谷戸小学校). 2-chome is divided between the zones of Tōnoyama, Tōka, Yato, and Nakano No. 1 (中野第一小学校) elementaries.

Chuo 1 and 3-chome and part of 2-chome are zoned to Nakano East Junior High School (中野東中学校). Chuo 4 and 5-chome are zoned to Nakano Junior High School (中野中学校). Part of 2-chome is zoned to No. 2 Junior High School (第二中学校).

Private:

- Horikoshi High School

== Gallery ==
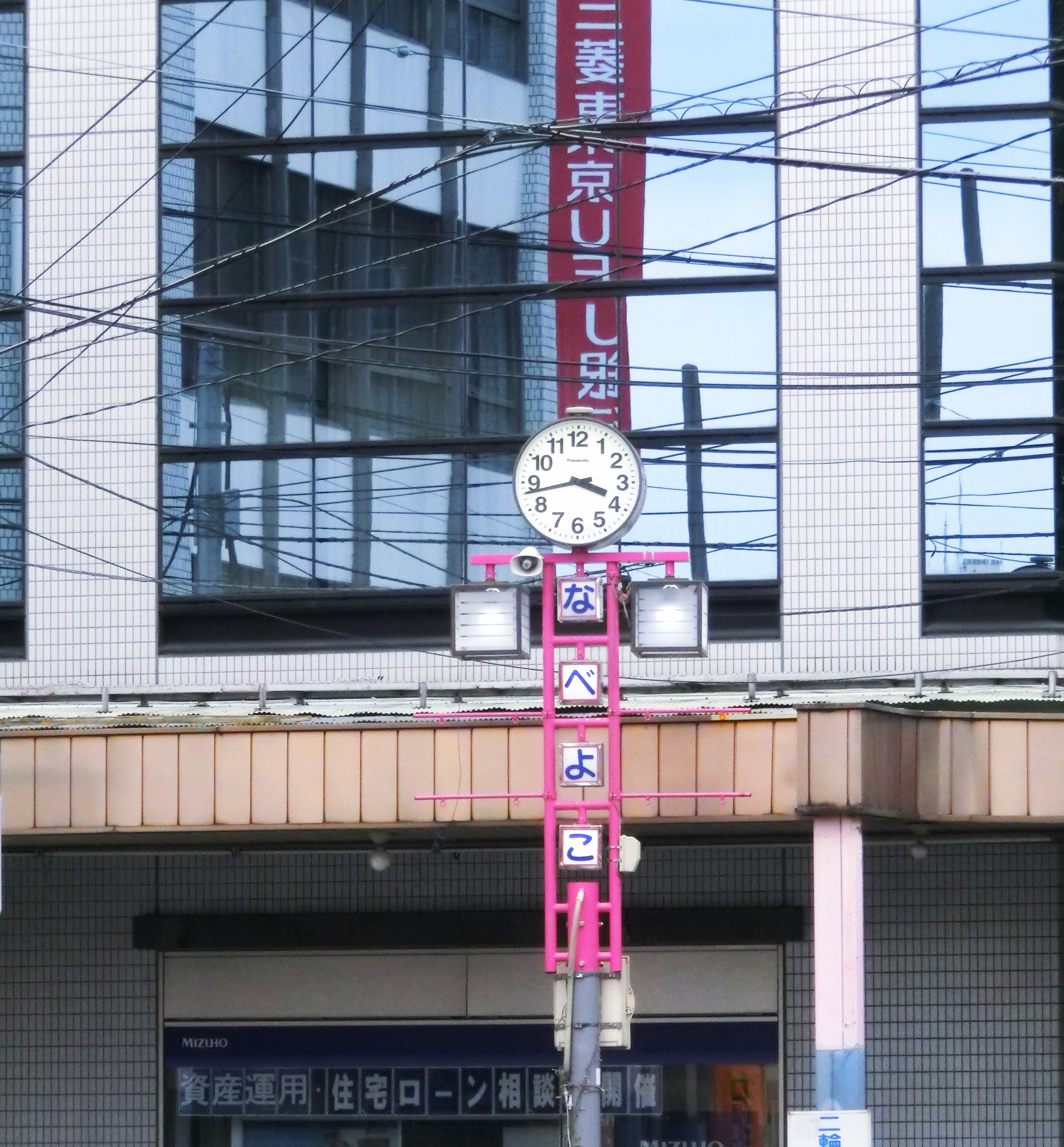
Nabe-Yoko

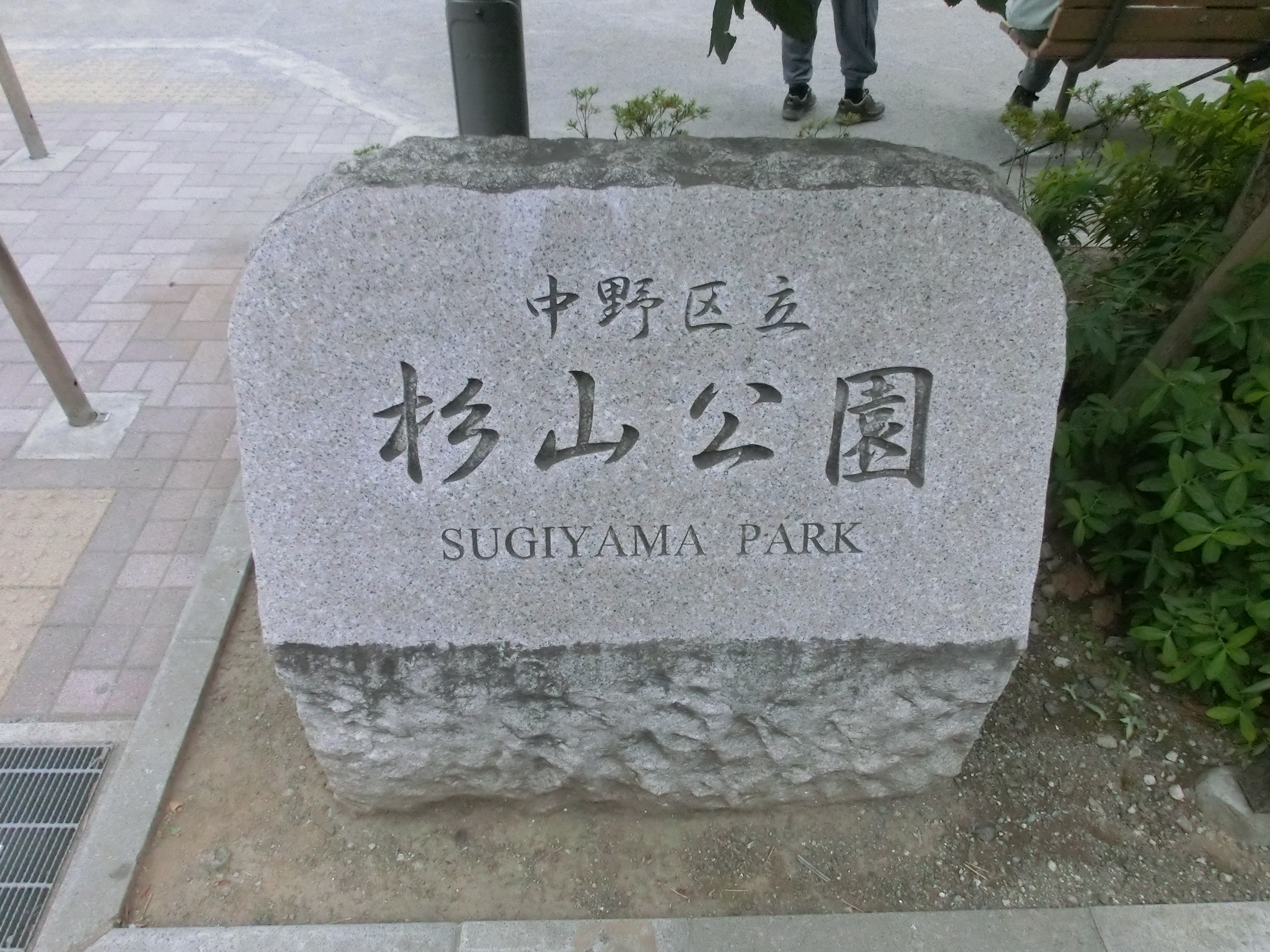
Sugiyama Park

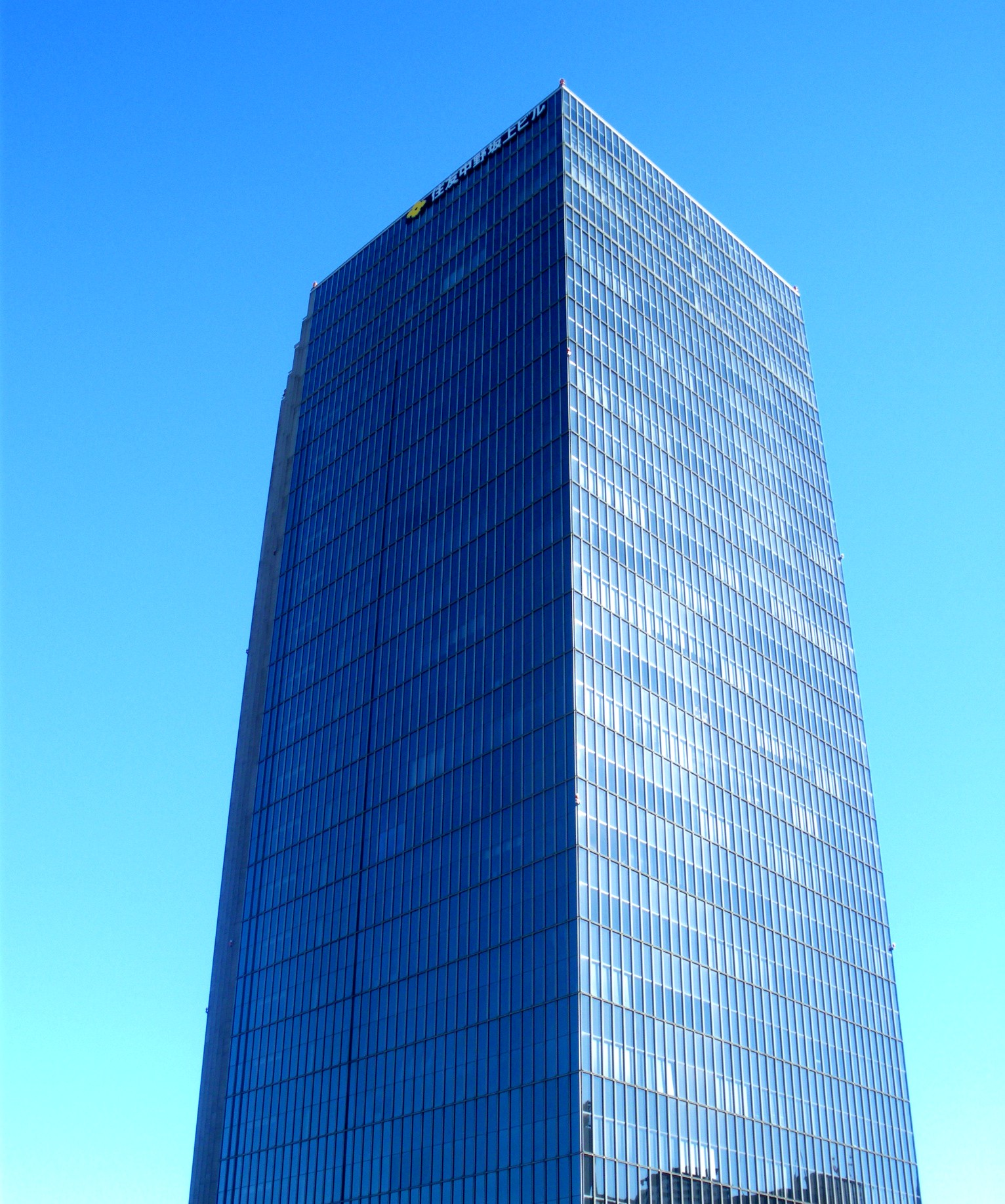
Sumitomo Nakano Sakaue Building

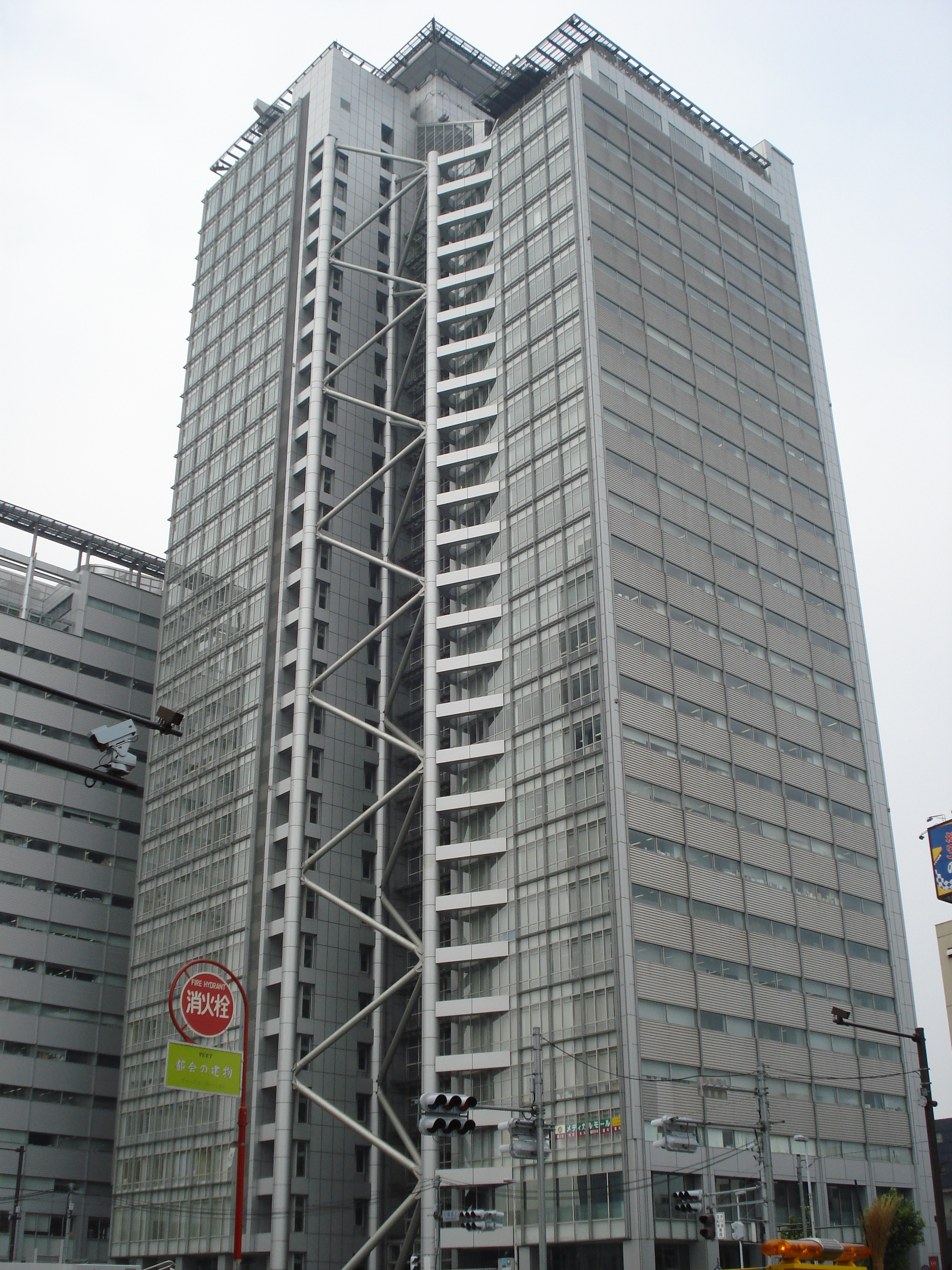
Nakano Sakaue Sun Bright Twin Building
