= Lost in Translation (soundtrack) =

Lost in Translation: Music from the Motion Picture Soundtrack

Soundtrack album
- Released: September 9, 2003
- Genre: Shoegaze; dream pop
- Length: 53:48
- Label: Emperor Norton
- Producer: Brian Reitzell (exec.)

Singles from Lost in Translation
- 1. "City Girl" Released: June 2003

Alternative cover
- Japanese cover

Lost in Translation: Music from the Motion Picture Soundtrack is the soundtrack album to the 2003 film Lost in Translation, directed by Sofia Coppola. The soundtrack was supervised by Brian Reitzell and was released on September 9, 2003, through Emperor Norton Records. It contains five songs by Kevin Shields, including one from his group My Bloody Valentine. Other artists featured on the soundtrack include Air, Death in Vegas, Squarepusher, Phoenix and the Jesus and Mary Chain.

== Background ==
Sofia Coppola said much of the soundtrack consisted of songs that she "liked and had been listening to", and she worked with Brian Reitzell to make Tokyo dream pop mixes to assist her writing of the film. Several of the tracks in these mixes were ultimately included in the soundtrack, including "Just Like Honey" by The Jesus and Mary Chain, as well as "Tommib" by Squarepusher and "Girls" by Death in Vegas.

Agathi Glezakos, an academic writing a review of Lost in Translation shortly after its release, wrote that the music in the film's karaoke scene constitutes a common "language" that allows Bob Harris (Bill Murray) and Charlotte (Scarlett Johansson) to connect with some of the Japanese people amidst their alienation. In that scene, the rendition of the Pretenders' "Brass in Pocket" was selected to showcase a lively side of Charlotte, and "(What's So Funny 'Bout) Peace, Love, and Understanding" was chosen to establish that Bob is from a different generation. Both Coppola and Murray finally selected Roxy Music's "More Than This" during the shoot itself because they liked the band and thought the lyrics fit the story.

The songs that were featured in the film but did not appear on the soundtrack include "The State We're In" by The Chemical Brothers, Patti Smith's cover of "When Doves Cry" and "Fuck the Pain Away" by Peaches.

== Reception ==
=== Critical ===
Professional ratings
Aggregate scores
Source	Rating
Metacritic	84/100
Review scores
Source	Rating
AllMusic	4/5 stars
Entertainment Weekly	B+
Drowned in Sound	8/10
No Ripcord	8/10
Pitchfork	6.3/10
Q	4/5 stars
Stylus	6.8/10
Uncut	8/10
URB	5/5 stars

Upon its release, the soundtrack received positive reviews from music critics. At Metacritic, which assigns a normalized rating out of 100 to reviews from critics, the album received an average score of 84, which indicates "universal acclaim", based on 9 reviews. AllMusic critic Heather Phares wrote: "Perfectly defined in its hazy beauty, this soundtrack loses nothing in its translation from a quietly wonderful movie into a quietly wonderful album." Critic Gareth Dobson of Drowned in Sound said the soundtrack "gently guides you through a myriad of woozy joys", and called it "a beautifully-fashioned record that works completely outside of its film setting but also acts as a haunting centrepiece to the movie itself." Similarly, Consequence of Sound critic Frank Mojica called the music "the third star of the picture", adding that "[t]he atmospherics of shoegaze dream pop and the feelings of longing they evoke, coupled with the beauty of sadness, reflect the emotions and moods throughout the film". Mark Richardson of Pitchfork wrote: "For the most part, the tracks hang together and flow relatively well, orbiting the shimmering dreampop mass that serves as the record's unstated inspiration." Andrew Unterberger of Stylus Magazine described the soundtrack as "disappointing, but still a worthy purchase."

=== Legacy ===
Consequence of Sound critic Frank Mojica stated that "Lost in Translation is renowned for its soundtrack, and the music serves as the third star of the picture." On the film's possible legacy, Mojica also wrote: "One has to wonder how much of a role the film and its soundtrack had in the rebirth of shoegaze in the mid '00s. After all, My Bloody Valentine eventually reformed, as did The Jesus and Mary Chain, with the latter performing with none other than Scarlett Johansson at their Coachella reunion." The head of one record label, Sonic Cathedral, cited the soundtrack as an important factor that led to a resurgence of the genre. The soundtrack has been placed on several "best of" lists, including Rolling Stone's "The 25 Greatest Soundtracks of All Time" at number 22, Pitchfork's "The 50 Best Movie Soundtracks of All Time" at number 7, and "The 20 Soundtracks That Defined the 2000s" by Empire.

== Track listing ==
No.	Title	Writer(s)	Artist(s)	Length
1.	"Intro / Tokyo^{[a]}"			0:34
2.	"City Girl"	Kevin Shields	Kevin Shields	3:48
3.	"Fantino"	Sébastien Tellier	Sébastien Tellier	3:12
4.	"Tommib"	Tom Jenkinson	Squarepusher	1:20
5.	"Girls"	Tim Holmes; Richard McGuire	Death in Vegas	4:26
6.	"Goodbye"	Kevin Shields	Kevin Shields	2:32
7.	"Too Young"	Phoenix	Phoenix	3:18
8.	"Kaze wo Atsumete"	Takashi Matsumoto; Haruomi Hosono	Happy End	4:06
9.	"On the Subway"	Roger J. Manning Jr.; Brian Reitzell	Brian Reitzell and Roger J. Manning Jr.	1:10
10.	"Ikebana"	Kevin Shields	Kevin Shields	1:38
11.	"Sometimes"	Kevin Shields	My Bloody Valentine	5:19
12.	"Alone in Kyoto"	Jean-Benoît Dunckel; Nicolas Godin	Air	4:47
13.	"Shibuya"	Manning; Reitzell	Brian Reitzell and Roger J. Manning Jr.	3:26
14.	"Are You Awake?"	Kevin Shields	Kevin Shields	1:35
15.	"Just Like Honey"	James McLeish Reid; William Reid	The Jesus and Mary Chain	3:01
16.	"More Than This" (Hidden at the end of track 15 after 8:00 of silence; total time: 12:38. Only available on the CD version of the soundtrack.)	Bryan Ferry	Bill Murray with Roger J. Manning Jr. and Brian Reitzell	1:35

Japanese edition bonus track
No.	Title	Writer(s)	Artist(s)	Length
16.	"50 Floors Up" (12:58 including 8:00 of silence and the hidden track "More Than This")	Manning; Reitzell	Brian Reitzell and Roger J. Manning Jr.	3:21

Notes

- ^{^[a]} "Intro / Tokyo" contains samples from the following tracks performed by Yellow Generation: "Lost Generation", composed by Sora Izumikawa; "Kitakaze To Taiyo", composed by Miki Watanabe; and "Carpe Diem – Ima Konoshunkanwo Ikiru", composed by Akinori Kumata. All lyrics were written by Masato Ochi.

== Personnel ==
- Richard Beggs – sound design (tracks 1, 13)
- Kevin Shields – production (tracks 2, 6, 10, 11, 14); engineering (tracks 2, 6, 10, 11, 14)
- Brian Reitzell – drums (tracks 2, 14); engineering (tracks 2, 6, 10, 11, 14); production (tracks 9, 13)
- Bryan Mills – bass guitar (track 14); engineering (tracks 2, 6, 10, 14)
- James Brown – engineering (tracks 2, 6, 10, 14)
- Rob Kirwan – engineering (tracks 2, 6, 10, 14)
- Roger Joseph Manning Jr. – production (tracks 9, 13)
- Justin Stanley – mixing (tracks 9, 13)
- Air – production (track 12)
- Nigel Godrich – mixing (track 12)
- Dan Hersch – mastering
- Bill Inglot – mastering

== Charts ==
Chart performance for Lost in Translation
Chart (2003–2004)	Peak position
Belgian Albums (Ultratop Flanders)	61
French Albums (SNEP)	33
UK Compilation Albums (OCC)	41
UK Soundtrack Albums (OCC)	4
US Independent Albums (Billboard)	13
US Soundtrack Albums (Billboard)	13

Chart (2022)	Peak position
UK Compilation Albums (OCC)	20
UK Soundtrack Albums (OCC)	2
