= Live in Japan (Primal Scream album) =

Live album by Primal Scream
- Released: 2003
- Recorded: 16–18 November 2002
- Genre: Alternative rock; electronica
- Label: Sony

Primal Scream chronology
Shoot Speed – More Dirty Hits (2004)	Live in Japan (2003)	Riot City Blues (2006)

Live In Japan is a live album by Scottish rock group Primal Scream, which was released in 2003 for the Japanese market only. All were tracks recorded at Zepp Tokyo in 2002.

== Track listing ==
1. "Accelerator"
2. "Miss Lucifer"
3. "Rise"
4. "Shoot Speed/Kill Light"
5. "Pills"
6. "Autobahn 66"
7. "City"
8. "Rocks"
9. "Kowalski"
10. "Swastika Eyes"
11. "Skull X"
12. "Higher Than the Sun"
13. "Jailbird"
14. "Movin' on Up"
15. "Medication"
16. "Born to Lose"

== Personnel ==
=== Primal Scream ===
- Bobby Gillespie – vocals, percussion, guitar
- Andrew Innes – guitar
- Robert Young – guitar
- Martin Duffy – keyboards, programming, samples, effects
- Gary 'Mani' Mounfield – bass
- Darrin Mooney – drums

=== Additional musicians ===
- Kevin Shields – guitar, effects, keyboards
