= City Girl (song) =

Single by Kevin Shields

from the album Lost in Translation: Original Soundtrack
- B-side: "Just Like Honey"; (The Jesus and Mary Chain)
- Released: June 2003
- Recorded: Summer 2002 in London, United Kingdom
- Genre: Alternative rock
- Length: 3:48
- Label: Inertia, LIT
- Songwriter(s): Kevin Shields
- Producer(s): Kevin Shields

"City Girl" is a song by the Irish alternative rock musician Kevin Shields. It is the second track from the soundtrack to the 2003 film Lost in Translation and was released as a standalone single in June 2003. Recorded during summer 2002 with Lost in Translation's music co-ordinator Brian Reitzell, "City Girl" was among the first original material released by Shields since My Bloody Valentine's second studio album, Loveless (1991)—on which he was the main composer, musician and producer.

Produced by Shields, "City Girl" has been described as a mid-tempo garage-influenced alternative rock song and since its original release, critics have drawn comparisons between it and songs from Loveless. An accompanying music video for "City Girl" was directed by Sofia Coppola, the director of Lost in Translation. "City Girl" was well received upon its release, and its inclusion on the Lost in Translation soundtrack, and earned Shields nominations for a number of awards; these include a British Academy of Film and Television Arts (BAFTA) Award for Best Film Music, an Irish Film and Television Academy (IFTA)Award for Best Music in a Film and an Online Film Critics Society Award for Best Original Score.

== Origin and recording ==
"City Girl" is one of four songs Kevin Shields composed for Sofia Coppola's 2003 film, Lost in Translation. Shields became involved with the film's original score after being contacted by the film's music co-ordinator Brian Reitzell in Tokyo, Japan. Reitzell and Shields began impromptu jam sessions in London, United Kingdom during summer 2002, where Shields composed "City Girl". The duo "adopted a late-night recording schedule" that consisted of them recording between midnight "and seven in the morning". According to Shields, "it was [their] productive time. It's basically as though the world's disappeared."

Describing the song's origins in an interview with National Public Radio (NPR), Shields said that the writing and recording of "City Girl" was "very simple, in the sense that it was just me teaching Brian the chord structure and Brian just jamming along to it." The duo recorded an instrumental rehearsal version of the song, after which Shields said there was "no point in rerecording it." He later wrote lyrics and recorded vocals for the song but emphasised that there was no need for "elaborations [or] overdubs." Shields described this method of recording as a "slapdash approach", noting that there was no "point in labouring over something … because you don't know what's going to work".

== Music and lyrics ==
"City Girl"
"City Girl" features "simple and rough" guitar techniques that have been compared to Shields' material with My Bloody Valentine.

"City Girl" has been described as "mid-tempo, with an unusual repeating melody and a two-note chorus. The guitar is simple and rough, a bit garage-rock, bouncing over characteristically buried drums that seem an afterthought." Rolling Stone noted that the song—and other tracks Shields contributed to the Lost in Translation soundtrack—feature "My Bloody Valentine's ethereal sensibility, but they are more fragile in their construction, without Shields' furious sheets of guitar."

Shields has referred to "City Girl"'s composition as "average and vulnerable" and said of the lyrics: "It's kind corny words, like 'I love you' and 'you're beautiful' and the kind of corny, simple things that people tend to think when they actually get infatuated with somebody." According to Rolling Stone, the song's lyrics "aptly reflects the quiet nature of the film" and Shields has said that both he and Reitzell were "under the influence of the film" while Shields composed the song.

== Music video ==
The music video for "City Girl" was directed by Lost in Translation director Sofia Coppola. The video was filmed in Tokyo, Japan—where Lost in Translation is based—and features the use of handheld cameras, production techniques such as jump cuts, and "blurry visuals" of the city. Coppola used footage from Lost in Translation that was not included in the final cut alongside selected sequences from the film to create the video.

Critic Geoff King said that the "City Girl" music video, like others Coppola directed around the same time period, "offer little else to go on for an auteurist account." He noted the contrast between Coppola's direction and overall quality in the "City Girl" video and her music video for "I Just Don't Know What to Do with Myself" by The White Stripes, which was released the same year. The music video for "City Girl" was included as a bonus feature on the Lost in Translation DVD, released on 3 February 2004. An Upscale version of the video was included as a bonus feature on the Blu-ray release of the film, released on 7 December 2010.

== Release and reception ==
"City Girl" was released as a one-track promotional CD single in June 2003 on the Australian independent record label, Inertia. It was later released in the United States as a split 7-inch single with The Jesus and Mary Chain song "Just Like Honey", which was also featured on the Lost in Translation soundtrack. The split single was a limited edition release and pressed on yellow and clear vinyl. "City Girl" was later included as the second track on the Lost in Translation soundtrack, released in August 2003 on V2 Records, alongside three other songs Shields composed for the film: "Goodbye", "Ikebana" and "Are You Awake?"

Upon its release, "City Girl" received moderate critical acclaim. Pitchfork writer Mark Richardson said that "on first listen it sounds like a demo of a pre-Loveless track, possibly from the You Made Me Realise era" and while there was "no exploration on that front … the melody and voice are familiar and welcome." Writing for Stylus Magazine, Andrew Unterberger called "City Girl" "a worthy opener" and added that "[the song is] where Kevin's at right now—making pretty pop songs. There is so little to this song that it's almost enough to make you think Kevin's lost his mind." Unterberger summarised the song as "gorgeous, and definitely has that sighing quality to it that makes the film so delectable." Exclaim! journalist Michael White noted that it was "the indisputable highlight of the soundtrack" and AllMusic's Heather Phares described "City Girl" as an "open-ended piece" and "naïve [and] guitar-driven" but added that it did not compare to Shields' compositions on Loveless (1991).

"City Girl" was among the material that earned Shields nominations for a British Academy of Film and Television Arts (BAFTA) Award for Best Film Musicat the 57th British Academy Film Awards, an Irish Film and Television Academy (IFTA) Award for Best Music in a Film at the 2nd Irish Film & Television Awards, and an Online Film Critics Society Award for Best Original Score at the Online Film Critics Society Awards 2003.

== Track listings ==
Australian promotional CD (Inertia, 80 PG20235)
No.	Title	Writer(s)	Performer	Length
1.	"City Girl"	Kevin Shields	Shields	3:48

U.S. split 7-inch (LIT, LITEP450612)
No.	Title	Writer(s)	Performer	Length
1.	"City Girl"	Shields	Shields	3:48
2.	"Just Like Honey"	Jim Reid, William Reid	The Jesus and Mary Chain	3:01

== Personnel ==
All personnel credits adapted from Lost in Translation: Original Soundtrack's liner notes.

Performers

- Kevin Shields – vocals, guitar, production, engineering
- Brian Reitzell – drums, engineering

Technical personnel

- Bryan Mills – engineering
- James Brown – engineering
- Rob Kirwan – engineering

== See also ==
- 2003 in Irish music
- Kevin Shields discography
