= The Weight of History / Only Once Away My Son =

Single by Brian Eno and Kevin Shields

"The Weight of History" / "Only Once Away My Son"

Song by Brian Eno with Kevin Shields
- Released: 21 April 2018
- Genre: Ambient; drone
- Label: Opal

"The Weight of History" and "Only Once Away My Son" are songs made in collaboration by Brian Eno and Kevin Shields, released as a double A-side in April 2018 for Record Store Day.

== History ==
"Only Once Away My Son" was originally released in October 2017 as part of Adult Swim's Singles Program. Both tracks were made available for streaming in October 2018.

== Reception ==
In a positive review of "Only Once Away My Son" for Pitchfork, Marc Hogan wrote "[w]ith its decaying hums, low-end rumblings, and coruscating clatter, the instrumental track may not be groundbreaking for them, but it’s familiar in the best way. The biggest question: Is this good? Unequivocally, yes."

== Track listing ==
| No. | Title | Length |
|---|---|---|
| 1. | "The Weight of History" | 8:53 |
| 2. | "Only Once Away My Son" | 9:10 |
| Total length: | | 18:03 |
