= Lost in Translation =

2003 film by Sofia Coppola

- Theatrical release poster
- Directed by: Sofia Coppola
- Written by: Sofia Coppola
- Produced by: Ross Katz; Sofia Coppola
- Starring: Bill Murray; Scarlett Johansson; Giovanni Ribisi; Anna Faris; Fumihiro Hayashi
- Cinematography: Lance Acord
- Edited by: Sarah Flack
- Music by: Kevin Shields; Brian Reitzell; Roger Joseph Manning Jr.
- Production companies: American Zoetrope; Elemental Films
- Distributed by: Focus Features (international); Tohokushinsha Film (Japan)
- Release dates: August 29, 2003 (Telluride Film Festival); October 3, 2003 (United States); April 17, 2004 (Japan)
- Running time: 102 minutes
- Countries: United States; Japan
- Language: English
- Budget: $4 million
- Box office: $119 million

Lost in Translation is a 2003 romantic comedy drama film (Note: The film has been noted for its resistance to any single genre classification. While it has been labeled in terms such as "romantic comedy", the film has been identified for integrating elements from multiple genres, including romance, comedy, and drama. For one discussion of Lost in Translation's position between genres, see King 2010, pp. 60–75.) written and directed by Sofia Coppola. Bill Murray stars as Bob Harris, a fading American film star having a midlife crisis who travels to Tokyo to promote Suntory whiskey. He befriends another disillusioned American, Charlotte (Scarlett Johansson), a recent college graduate who has been married for two years. The film explores themes of alienation and disconnection against a backdrop of cultural displacement in Japan. It does not use mainstream narrative conventions and is atypical in its depiction of romance.

Coppola started writing the film after spending time in Tokyo and becoming fond of the city. She began forming a story about two characters experiencing a "romantic melancholy" in the Park Hyatt Tokyo, where she stayed while promoting her first feature film, the 1999 drama The Virgin Suicides. Coppola envisioned Murray playing the role of Bob from the beginning and tried to recruit him for months. While Murray eventually agreed to play the part, he did not sign a contract. Coppola spent a quarter of the film's $4 million budget without knowing if he would arrive.

Principal photography began on September 29, 2002, and lasted 27 days. Coppola kept a flexible schedule during filming with a small crew and minimal equipment. The screenplay was short and Coppola allowed significant improvisation during filming. The director of photography, Lance Acord, used available light where possible, and many Japanese places of business and public areas were used as locations. After 10 weeks of editing, Coppola sold distribution rights for the United States and Canada to Focus Features, and the company promoted the film through word of mouth.

Lost in Translation premiered on August 29, 2003, at the Telluride Film Festival, and was distributed to American theatres on September 12, 2003. At the 76th Academy Awards, Lost in Translation won Coppola Best Original Screenplay, and the film was nominated for Best Picture, Best Director and Best Actor (Murray). Other accolades won include three BAFTAs and three Golden Globes. It has since been named one of the greatest films of the 2000s and 21st century. The film received acclaim for its writing, direction, and performances, and grossed $119 million worldwide.

Lost in Translation drew criticism for its depiction of Japanese people; critics and scholars in both the United States and Japan accused the film of racism, Orientalism and anti-Asian stereotyping. This backlash led to organized political pushback as an Asian American movement during the 2003–2004 film awards season, which included a nationwide boycott and petition campaign launched by an Asian American and Pacific Islander (AAPI) organization against major motion picture industry groups at the 76th Academy Awards. The retrospective prompted a critical re-evaluation of the film's legacy, renewing media coverage and public debate regarding its controversial themes.

== Plot ==
Bob Harris is a burnt out American film star who arrives in Tokyo to appear in lucrative advertisements for Suntory's Hibiki whiskey. He stays at the Park Hyatt Tokyo and is miserable due to problems within his twenty-five-year marriage and a midlife crisis.

Charlotte, another American staying at the hotel, is a young Yale graduate in philosophy who is accompanying her husband John while he works as a celebrity photographer. She is feeling similarly disenchanted as she questions her marriage and is anxious about her future. They both struggle additionally with bouts of jet lag and culture shock in Tokyo and pass the time loitering around the hotel, Charlotte also trying ikebana by chance.

Charlotte is repelled by a vacuous Hollywood actress named Kelly, who is also at the hotel promoting a film. Kelly bumps into Charlotte and John, gushing over photography sessions she has previously done with him. Bob and Charlotte frequently cross paths in the hotel and eventually start to connect in the hotel bar.

After several encounters, when John is on assignment outside Tokyo, Charlotte invites Bob into the city to meet some local friends. They bond over an evening in Tokyo, where they experience the city nightlife together and end up singing at a karaoke box. In the days that follow, Bob and Charlotte spend more time together, and their friendship strengthens. One night while watching television and drinking sake, while neither can sleep, the two share an intimate conversation about Charlotte's personal uncertainties and their married lives.

Bob has a cold conversation with his wife, then spends the night with a jazz singer from the hotel bar. Charlotte hears the woman singing in Bob's room the next morning, leading to tension between Bob and Charlotte during a shabu-shabu lunch together. The pair encounter each other in the evening and Bob reveals that he will be leaving Tokyo the following day.

Bob and Charlotte reconcile and express how they will miss each other, making a final visit to the hotel bar. The next morning, when Bob is leaving the hotel, he and Charlotte share sincere but unsatisfactory goodbyes. On Bob's taxi ride to the airport, he sees Charlotte on a crowded street, stops the car, and walks to her. He then embraces her and whispers something in her ear. The two share a kiss and say goodbye before Bob departs.

== Cast ==
- Bill Murray as Bob Harris, a fading movie star
- Scarlett Johansson as Charlotte, a recent college graduate
- Giovanni Ribisi as John, Charlotte's husband, a celebrity photographer
- Anna Faris as Kelly, a Hollywood actress
- Fumihiro Hayashi as Charlie, Charlotte's friend
- Kunichi Nomura as Kun
- Catherine Lambert as a jazz singer (Note: Lambert was an actual performer in the bar at the Park Hyatt Tokyo. Coppola saw her sing "Scarborough Fair" at the hotel a year before filming and later induced a manager to help identify her so Coppola could cast her. Lambert performed the same song in the film.)
- Matthew Minami as himself
- Diamond Yukai as a commercial director
- Akiko Takeshita as Ms. Kawasaki, an interpreter
- Nanaho Asuka as a prostitute
- Akiko Monō as P chan
- Hiroshi Fujiwara as unnamed party guest
- Hiromix as nightclub guest and seen at the end of the credits roll
- Akira Yamaguchi as hotel bellboy

== Production ==
=== Writing ===
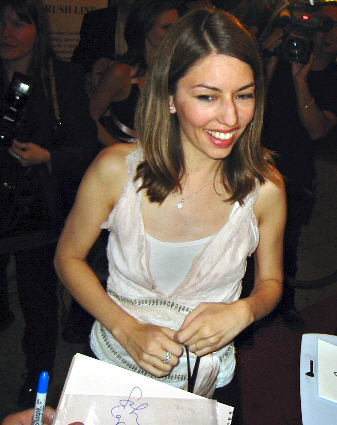
Sofia Coppola promoting Lost in Translation at the 2003 Toronto International Film Festival

After dropping out of college in her early twenties, Coppola often traveled to Tokyo, trying out a variety of jobs in fashion and photography. Unsure of what to do for a career, she described this period as a "kind of crisis" in which she meandered around the city contemplating her future. She came to feel fond of Tokyo, noting an otherworldly quality brought on as a foreigner grappling with feelings of jet lag in an unfamiliar setting. After many years, she settled on a career in filmmaking and returned to the city, staying at the Park Hyatt Tokyo to promote her first feature film, the 1999 drama The Virgin Suicides. (Note: Coppola has spoken favorably about her personal experiences staying at the hotel. She has described the locale as a "silent floating island" within the "chaotic" city environment of Tokyo, and she has named it one of her "favorite places in the world".)

Coppola began writing Lost in Translation after returning home from this press tour. Having been influenced by her background in Tokyo, she resolved to write a screenplay set there (Note: After its release, Coppola called Lost in Translation a "valentine" to Tokyo and cited a desire to portray what she liked about the city as one reason for making the film.) and began forming a story about two characters experiencing a "romantic melancholy" in the Park Hyatt Tokyo. Coppola was long attracted to the neon signs of the city and envisaged Tokyo taking on a "dreamy feeling" in the film. She recruited her friend Brian Reitzell, who ultimately served as the film's music producer, to create dream pop compilation mixes that she listened to while writing to help establish this mood.

Coppola did not initially write the screenplay in traditional script form, citing the difficulty of mapping out a full plot. Instead, she opted to write "little paragraphs" largely based on disparate impressions and experiences of her life in Tokyo, which she then adapted to a script. Among the first images she included was of her friend Fumihiro Hayashi performing a karaoke rendition of the Sex Pistols' "God Save the Queen", which Coppola saw him perform during the time she worked in Tokyo. After writing the first 20 pages with help from her brother, Roman Coppola, she returned to Tokyo for further inspiration. There, she videotaped anything she could use as a further writing aid.

Coppola envisioned Murray playing the role of Bob from the beginning, wanting to show off "his more sensitive side" and feeling amused by the image of him dressed in a kimono. She described her mental pictures of Murray as a significant source of inspiration for the story. For the character of Charlotte, Coppola drew from her own feelings of early-twenties disorientation, citing the strain in her relationship with her then-husband Spike Jonze as an influence for the relationship between Charlotte and John. She also drew inspiration from J. D. Salinger's character Franny Glass in Franny and Zooey, finding appeal in "the idea of a preppy girl having a breakdown".

As she developed the relationship between Bob and Charlotte, Coppola was compelled by the juxtaposition of the characters having similar internal crises at different stages of their lives. She cited the dynamic between Philip Marlowe (Humphrey Bogart) and Vivian Sternwood Rutledge (Lauren Bacall) in The Big Sleep as a source of inspiration for their relationship. Coppola reported doing little re-writing of the script, which took six months to complete and culminated in 75 pages, much shorter than the average feature film script. (Note: A feature film script is typically 90–120 pages.) Despite worrying that the screenplay was too short and "indulgent" for including assortments of her personal experiences, she resolved to begin production of the film.

=== Development ===
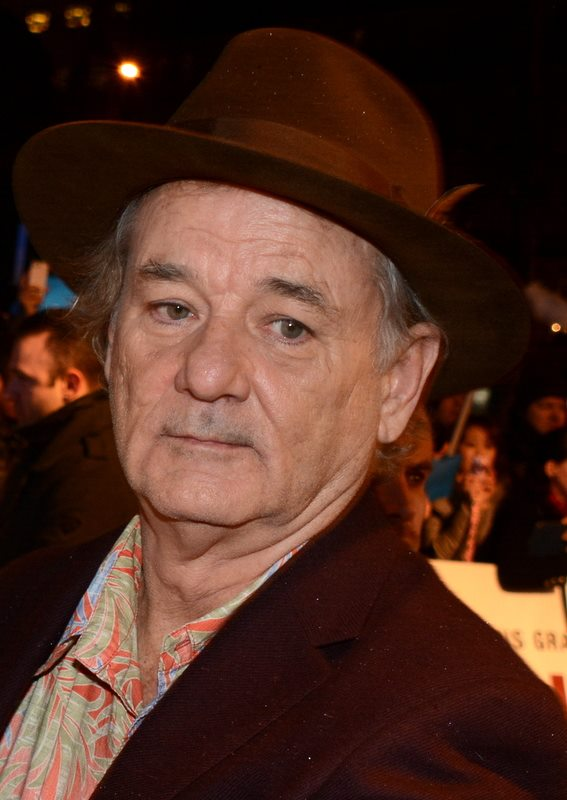
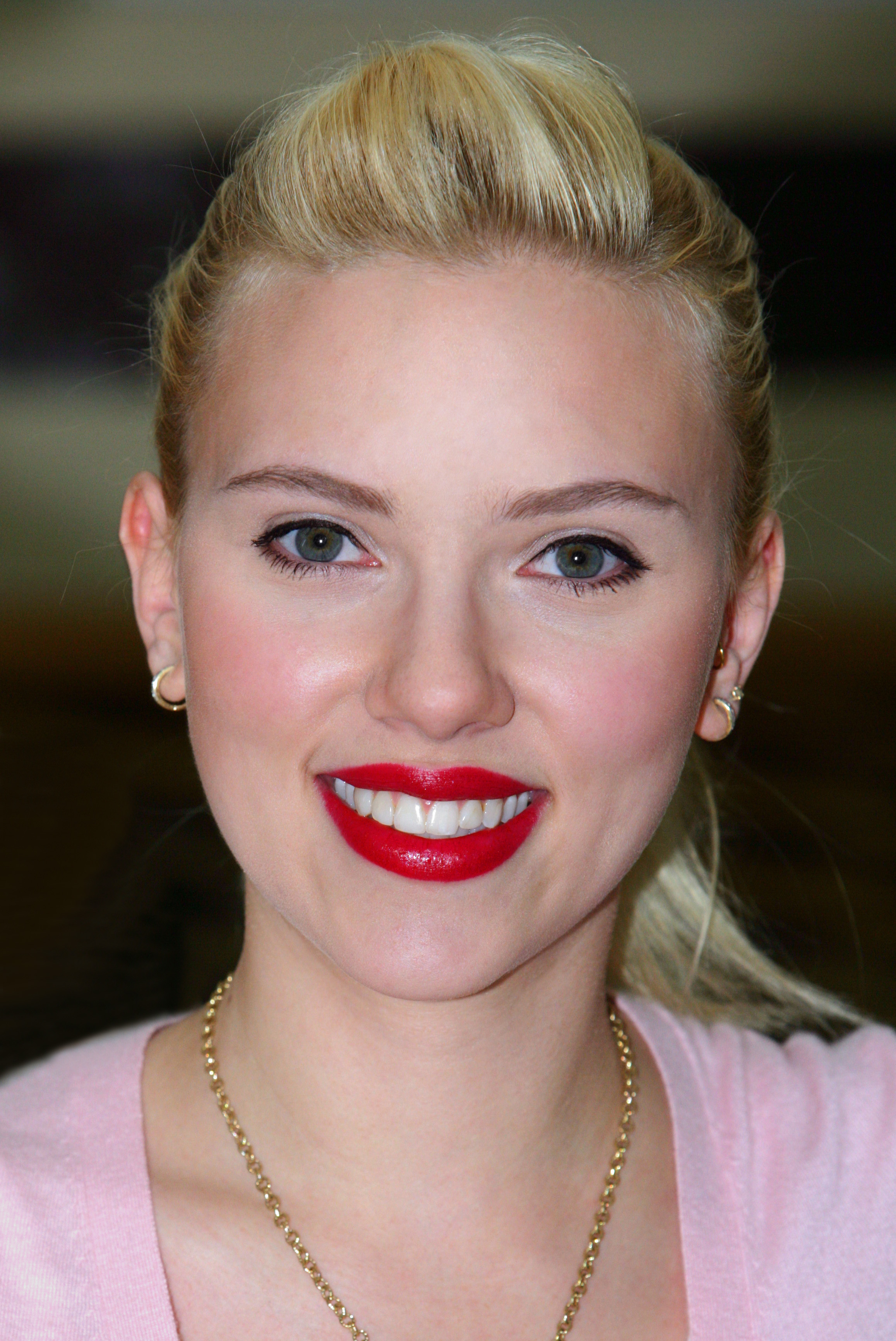
Bill Murray in 2014 (left) and Scarlett Johansson in 2008 (right)

Coppola maintained that she would not have made Lost in Translation without Murray. Murray had an 800 number for prospective clients interested in casting him, but he had a reputation as a recluse who was difficult to contact. Coppola relentlessly pursued him and sent telephone messages and letters for months. She also sought people in her professional network that might help her make contact. She recruited screenwriter Mitch Glazer, who was a longtime friend of Murray's, to accept an early version of the script and try to persuade him. Glazer was impressed with the story and said he called Murray frequently, telling him, "You need to read this", but he would not provide an answer. After up to a year of cajoling, Murray finally agreed to meet with Coppola at a restaurant to discuss the film. He then accepted the role, saying "she spent a lot of time getting me to be the guy. In the end, I felt I couldn't let her down."

Despite Murray's agreement, Coppola had to take him at his word, as he did not sign a formal contract. She described this as "nerve-wracking", wondering if he would show up for filming in Tokyo. She discussed the issue with director Wes Anderson, who had previously worked with Murray and encouraged her, saying, "If he says he's going to do it, he'll show up." For Murray's co-star, Coppola liked Johansson's performance in Manny & Lo, remembering her "as a cute little girl with that husky voice". She then invited Johansson to a restaurant to discuss the role. Initially worried that the 17-year-old Johansson might be too young to play a character in her twenties, Coppola concluded that she appeared older and could convincingly play the part. Coppola offered Johansson the role without an audition, which she accepted.

Feeling a sense of personal investment in the project, Coppola wanted to maintain final cut privilege and feared that a distribution deal with a North American studio would threaten her influence. It was also unlikely that a studio would provide such backing, given the short length of the screenplay and Murray's lack of formal involvement. Instead, she and her agent opted to sell foreign distribution rights to an assortment of companies to fund production costs of $4 million. She struck a deal first with Japan's Tohokushinsha Film, then with Pathé in France and Mikado Film in Italy, and finally with the international arm of Focus Features for the remaining foreign market. By piecing together the funding from multiple distributors, Coppola reduced the influence of any single financier. Still not knowing if Murray would show up in Tokyo, Coppola spent $1 million of the budget, knowing that his absence would doom the production. When he finally arrived, days before filming, she expressed significant relief.

The idea for Bill Murray's character doing an advertising campaign for Suntory came from Coppola's father Francis Ford Coppola and director Akira Kurosawa's Suntory Whiskey advertisement from the 1970s. In 2023 for Suntory's 100th anniversary, and 20 years after the appearance of Lost in Translation, she was asked to direct the company's anniversary tribute video starring Keanu Reeves, with a mix that included scenes from her film along with footage of her father and Kurosawa's original advertisement.

=== Filming ===
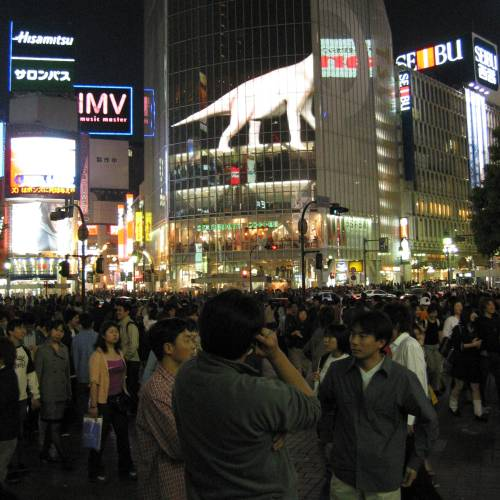
The production used bystanders as extras in public areas such as Shibuya Crossing (photograph taken in summer of 2002, with the walking dinosaur advertisement visible on the QFRONT (Tsutaya) building).

Principal photography began on September 29, 2002, and lasted 27 days. With a tight schedule and a limited $4 million budget, filming was done six days per week, without permits, marked by a "run-and-gun" approach: Coppola was keen to stay mobile with a small crew and minimal equipment. She conducted few rehearsals and kept a flexible schedule, sometimes scrapping filming plans to shoot something she noticed on location if she thought it better served the story. (Note: One example includes the sequence featuring Charlotte walking through Shibuya Crossing. When Coppola noticed that rain had made the area look hazy and atmospheric, she scrapped filming plans in a nearby arcade to shoot the sequence.) Since the screenplay was sparse, missing details were often addressed during shooting, and Coppola allowed a significant amount of improvisation in dialogue, especially from Murray. One example includes the scene in which Bob is being photographed for Suntory whisky, wherein Coppola encouraged Murray to react to the photographer spontaneously as she whispered names for the man to repeat to Murray as unrehearsed dialogue, such as "Roger Moore". (Note: Other examples of significant improvisation during shooting include the scenes that occur in the karaoke box and sushi restaurant.)

While key crew members were Americans that Coppola invited to Tokyo, most of the crew was hired locally. This proved to be challenging for the production, as most of the Japanese crew could not communicate with Coppola in English, so both sides relied on translations by a bilingual assistant director and a gaffer. The production encountered frequent delays while translations took place and suffered from occasional cultural misunderstandings, such as one example when Coppola described a shoot in a restaurant that ran 10–15 minutes late, something she said was normal on an American shoot, but it prompted the restaurant owner to feel disrespected; he subsequently disconnected the crew's lights and the film's Japanese location manager resigned. Despite this, Coppola said she worked to adapt to a Japanese style of filmmaking, not wanting to impose an approach that her crew was not used to.

Coppola worked closely to visualize the film with her director of photography, Lance Acord. She showed him and other key crew members a book of photographs she created that represented the visual style she wanted to convey in the film. To evoke a sense of isolation in Bob, Coppola and Acord used stationary shots in the hotel and avoided conspicuous camera movements. They also had numerous discussions about shooting on video, but they ultimately decided that film better suited the romantic undertones of the story. Coppola remarked, "Film gives a little bit of a distance, which feels more like a memory to me. Video is more present tense". Acord believed that new film stocks would reduce the need for excessive lighting, ultimately using Kodak Vision 500T 5263 35 mm stock for night exteriors and Kodak Vision 320T 5277 stock in daylight. Most of the film was shot with an Aaton 35-III camera. For some confined locations where the Aaton would have been too noisy, a Moviecam Compact was used.

With high-speed film stocks, Acord chose to utilize available light as often as possible, only supplementing with artificial lights when necessary. He reported "never really" rigging lights for night exteriors, relying on the natural light on Tokyo's city streets. For interior sequences in the Park Hyatt Tokyo, he relied mostly on the hotel's practical lighting sources, shooting at a wide open f-stop and heavily cutting the light to eliminate reflections in the hotel window. Acord said he heard objections about lighting from some of the Japanese electricians, who were unaccustomed to relying so much on available light and were concerned that the exposure would not be sufficient. Acord, assured that the film stocks would hold up against lower lighting, ultimately shot much of the film two stops underexposed.

Many of the shooting locations were local places of business and public areas at the time of filming, including rooms, bar and swimming pool in the Park Hyatt Tokyo and Shibuya Crossing in Tokyo. Filming also took place at Jōgan-ji (Nakano, Tokyo). The opening scene was done at Yasukuni-dōri in Kabuki-chō. Charlotte's ride at the subway was taken at Omote-sando Station at the Hanzōmon and Ginza lines platform. The chase scene after the bar and through the Pachinko parlor "Botan" were around Naka-Meguro Station. Brief scenes were also filmed in Kyoto at the Heian Shrine, and Nanzen-ji.

On public streets and subways, the production did not secure filming permits and relied on city bystanders as extras. Coppola described the shooting as "documentary-style" and was worried at times about getting stopped by police, so she kept a minimal crew. In the hotel, the production was not allowed to shoot in public areas until 1 or 2 a.m. to avoid disturbing guests. In the film's concluding sequence in which Bob and Charlotte make their final goodbyes, Coppola reported being unhappy with the dialogue she had scripted, so Murray improvised the whisper in Johansson's ear. Too quiet to be understandable, Coppola considered dubbing audio in the scene, but she ultimately decided it was better that it "stays between the two of them". After production concluded, Coppola supervised 10 weeks of editing by Sarah Flack in New York City.

Selected filming locations

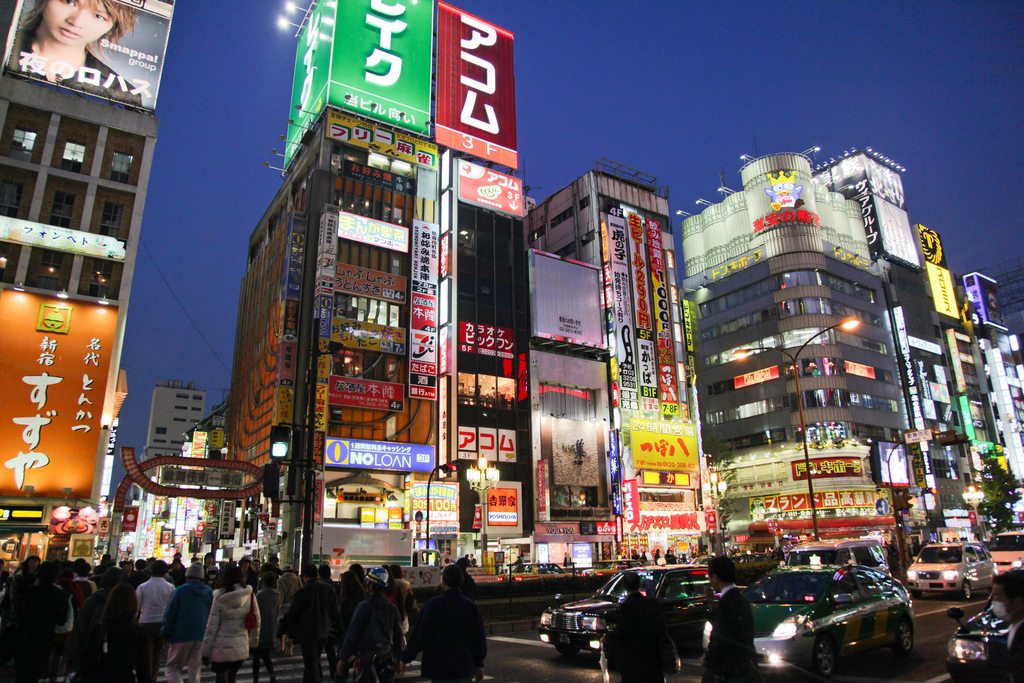
Yasukuni-dōri in Kabuki-chō, with the Donki store at the corner

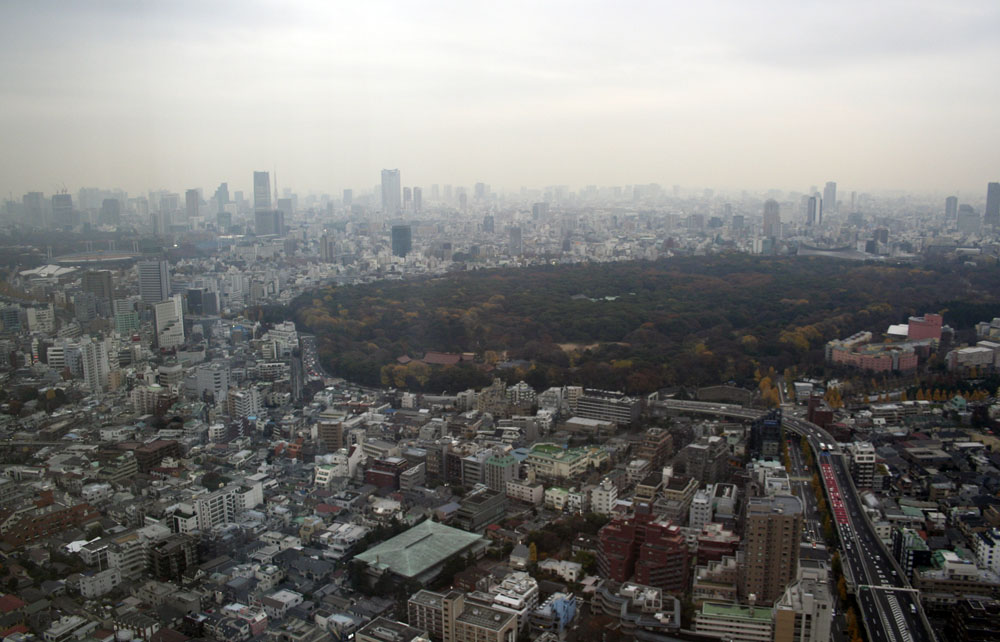
View from the 47th floor of the Park Hyatt Tokyo

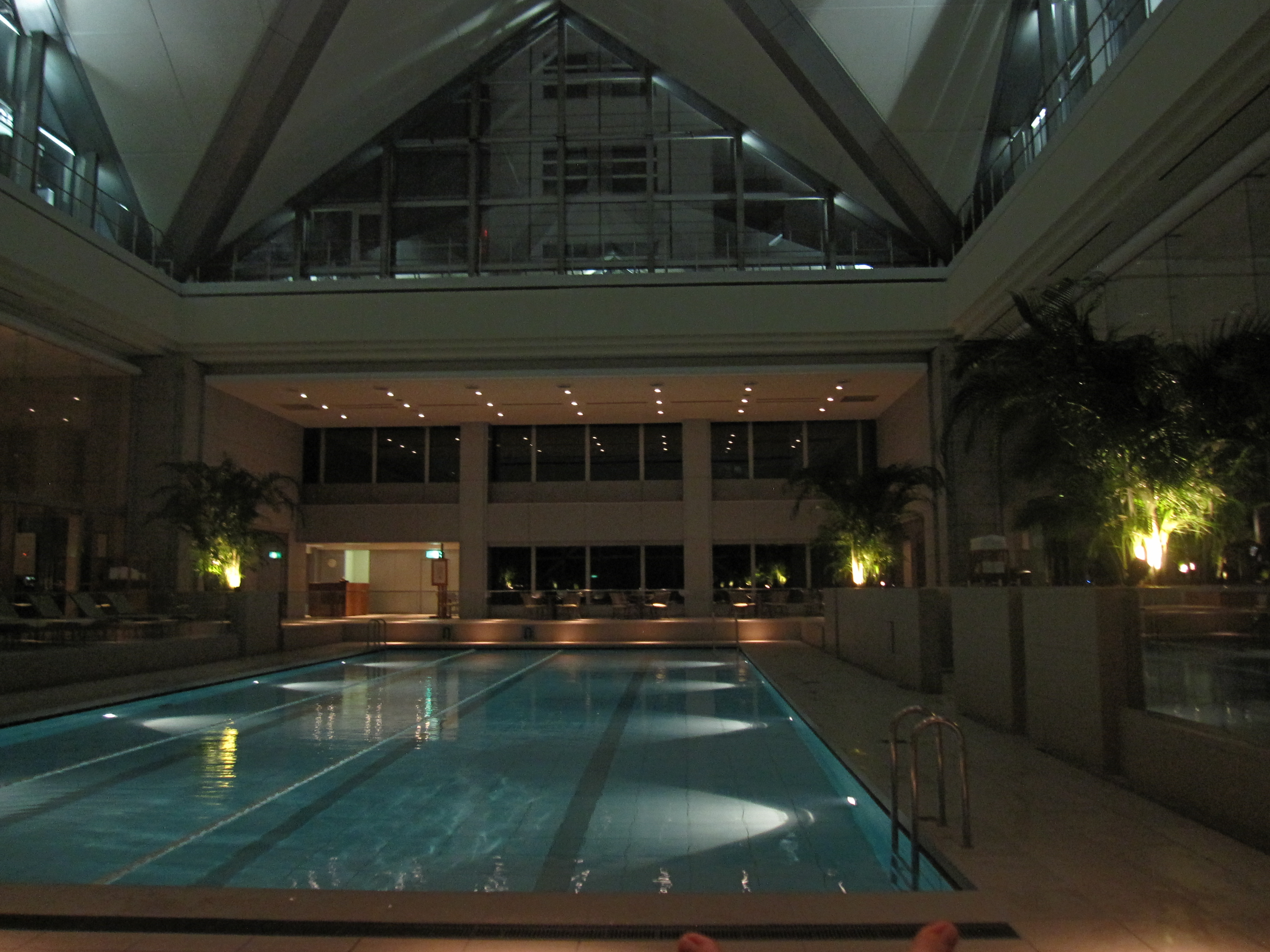
Swimming pool of the Park Hyatt

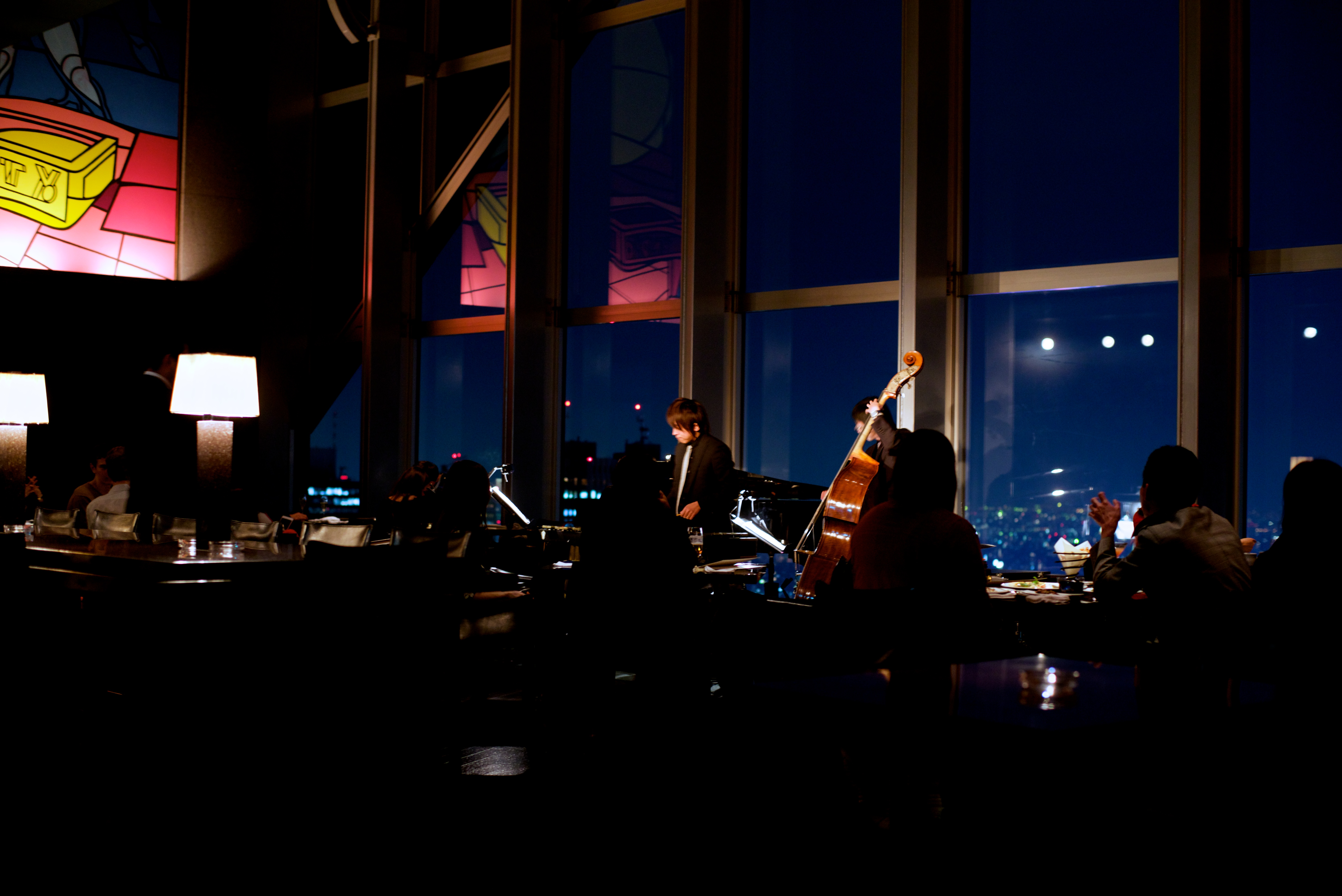
Bar of the Park Hyatt

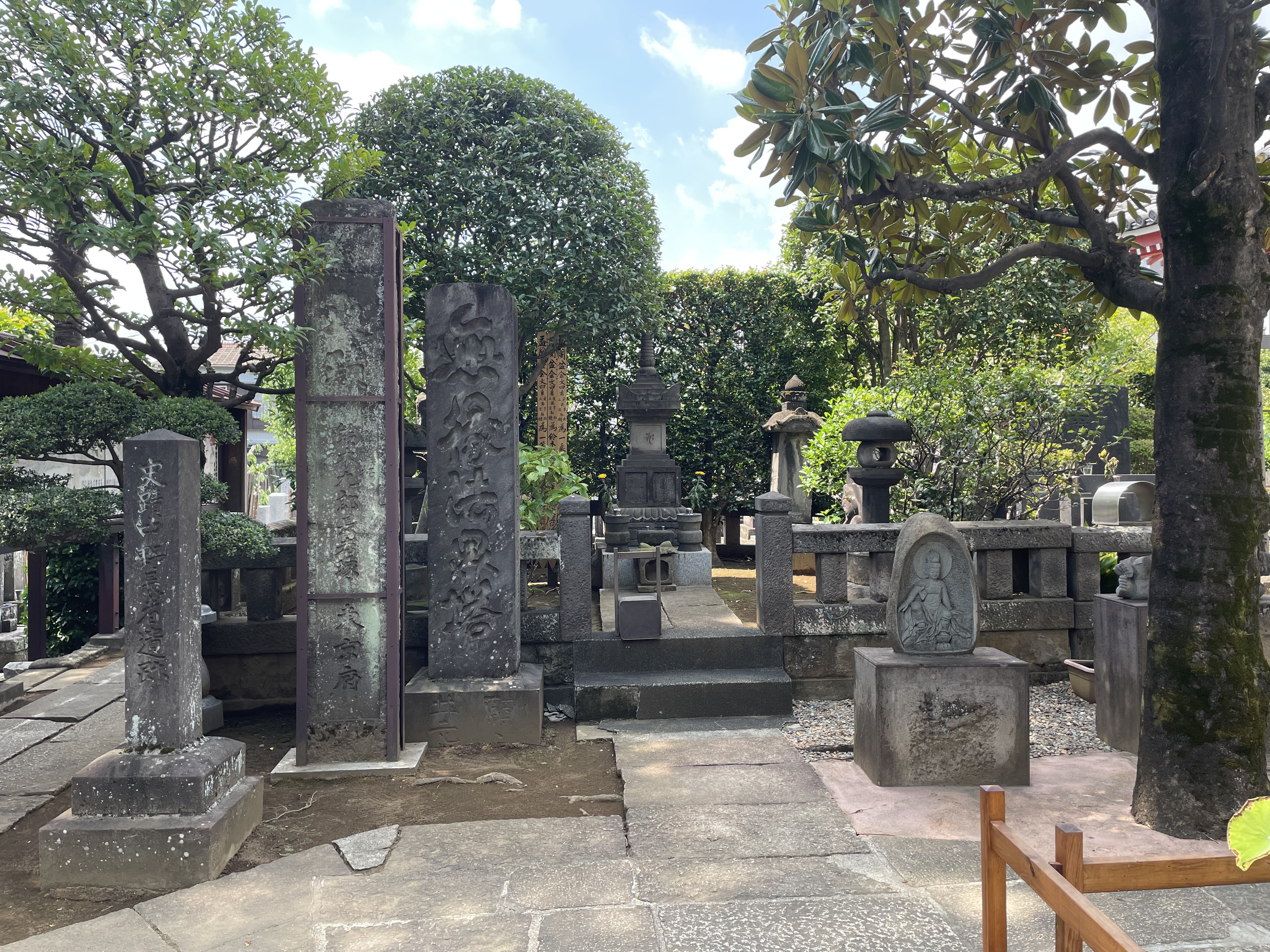
Cemetery of Jōgan-ji (Nakano, Tokyo)

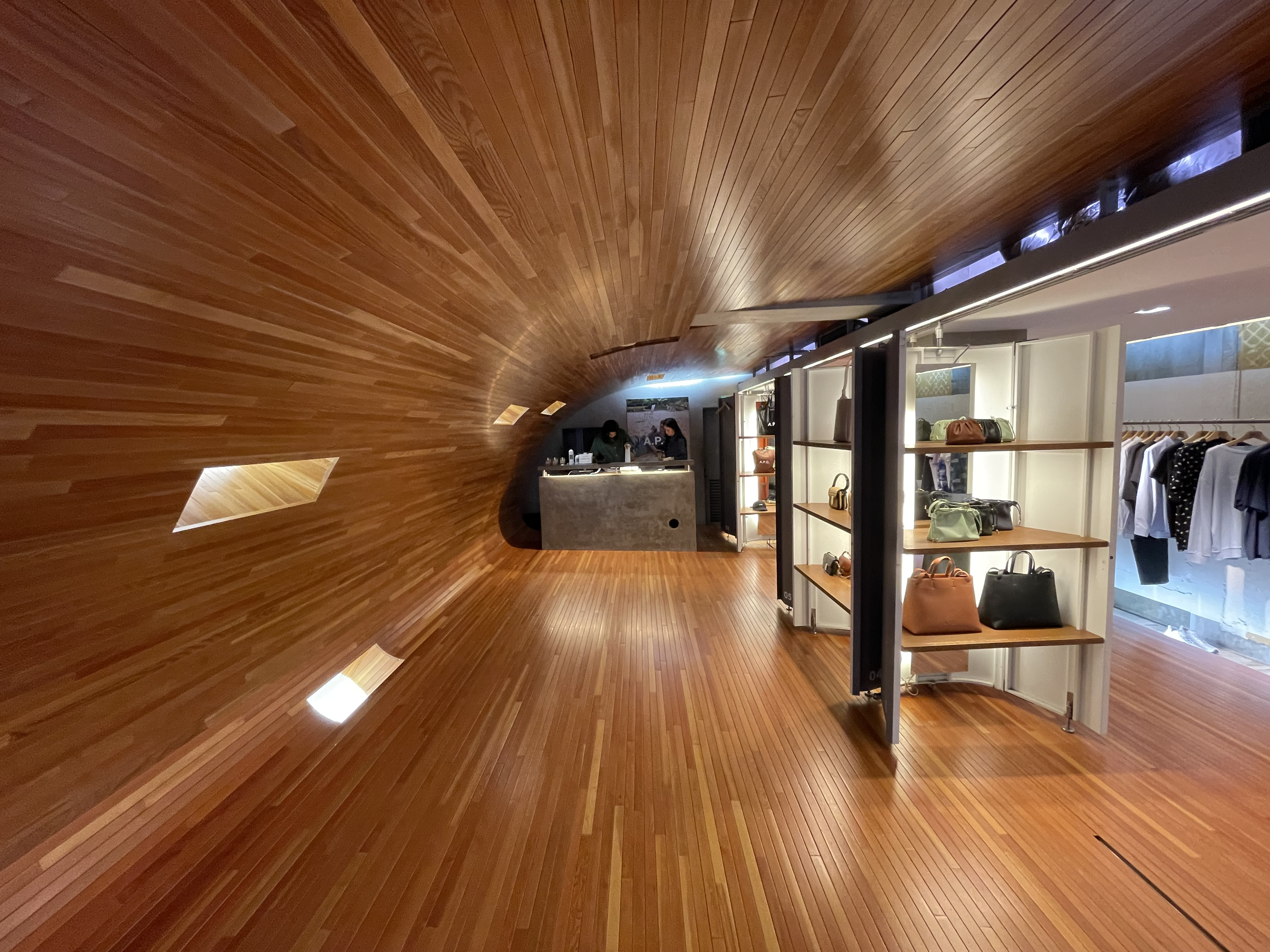
Interior of the A.P.C. Harajuku Underground store

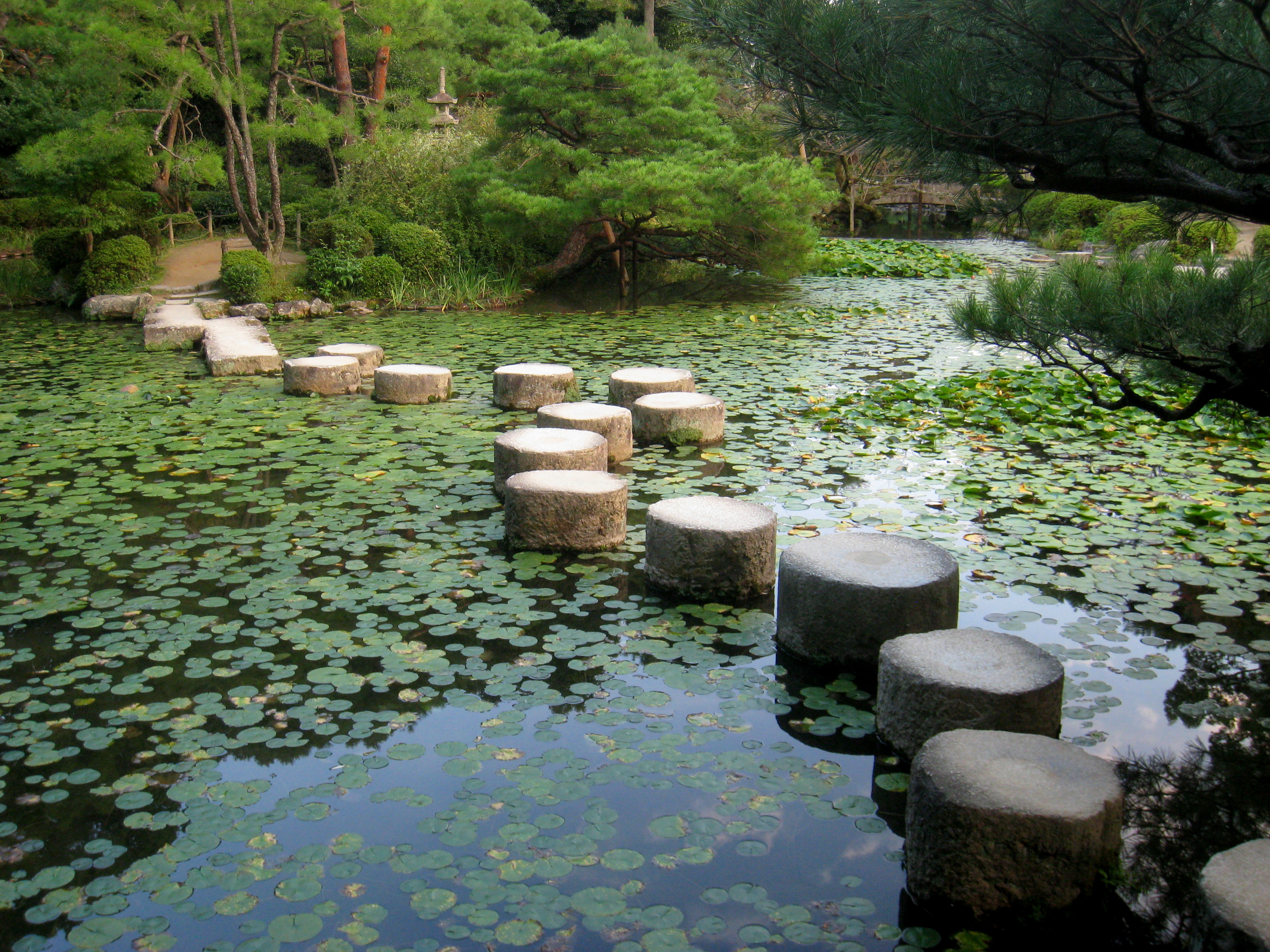
Stepping stones in the gardens of Heian Shrine, Kyoto

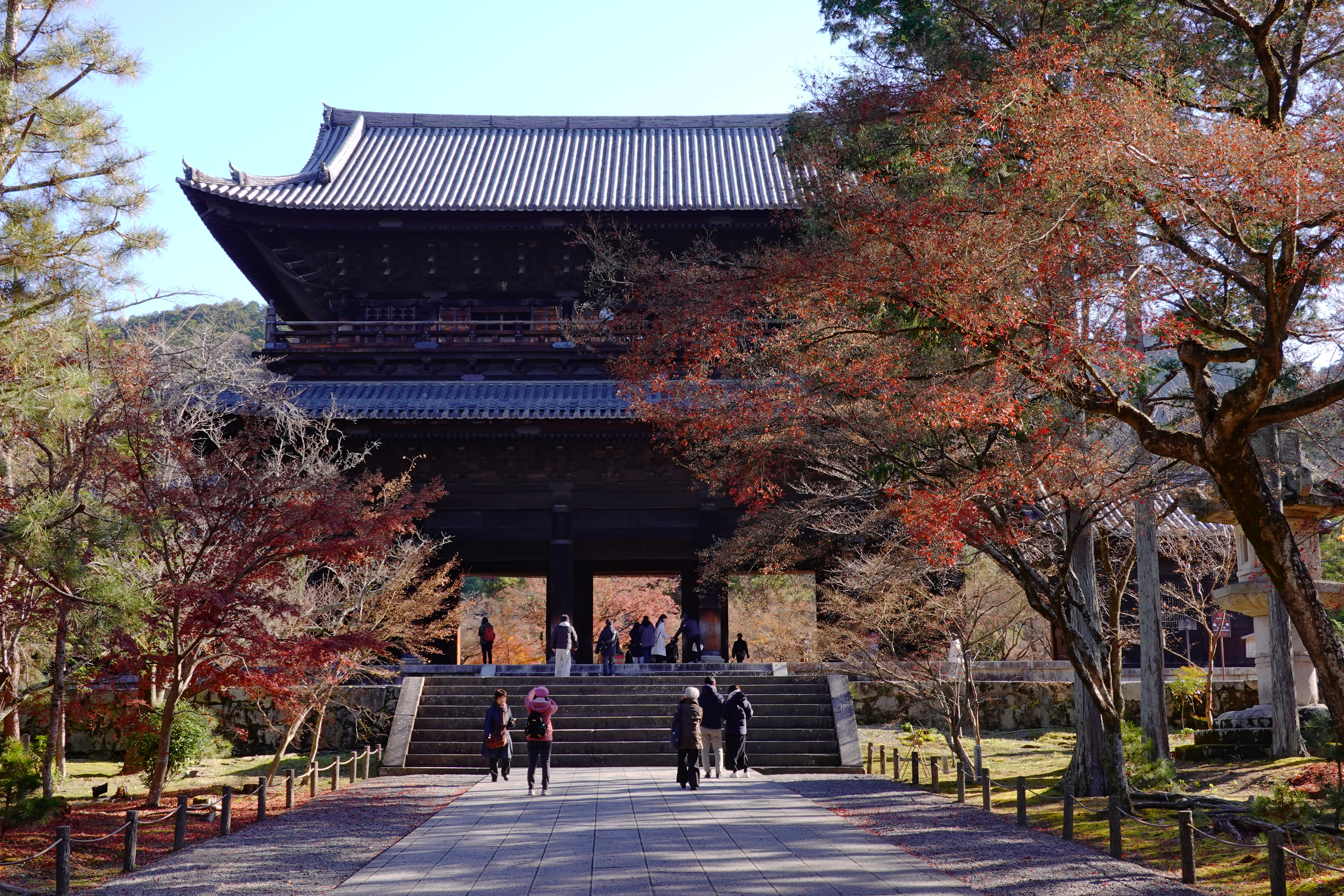
Main gate of Nanzen-ji, Kyoto

== Soundtrack ==
The film's soundtrack was released by Emperor Norton Records on September 9, 2003. It contains 15 tracks, largely from the shoegaze and dream pop genres of indie and alternative rock. The soundtrack was supervised by Brian Reitzell and contains songs from artists and groups including Death in Vegas, Phoenix, Squarepusher, Sébastien Tellier, and Happy End. The Jesus and Mary Chain's song "Just Like Honey" and "Sometimes" by My Bloody Valentine featured, and four original tracks were written for Lost in Translation by the latter band's frontman, Kevin Shields. Other tracks produced for the film include two co-written by Reitzell and Roger Joseph Manning Jr., and one by Air. Songs featured in the film that are not in the soundtrack include karaoke performances of Elvis Costello's cover of "(What's So Funny 'Bout) Peace, Love, and Understanding" and the Pretenders' "Brass in Pocket". A further performance by Murray of Roxy Music's "More Than This" is included as a bonus track. (Note: "(What's So Funny 'Bout) Peace, Love, and Understanding" was chosen for Bob to highlight his position in an older generation, "Brass in Pocket" was chosen for Charlotte to show her playful side, and "More Than This" was chosen extemporaneously by Coppola and Murray during shooting, after the two discovered they had a mutual affinity for Roxy Music.)

During the screenwriting stage, Coppola spoke to Reitzell about the "moody" and "melancholic" qualities she wanted the music to convey in the film, as well as what Reitzell understood to be the "strange, floating, jet-lagged weirdness" that would define the central characters. Coppola said she wanted the soundtrack "to be less like a score" and more like the dream-pop mixes Reitzell made to assist her writing of the film. While Shields had released little music since the release of Loveless in 1991, at Reitzell's suggestion, he and Coppola enlisted him to help write original music for the film; Reitzell believed Shields "could capture that droning, swaying, beautiful kind of feeling that we wanted." He then joined Shields in London for some two months of overnight recording sessions, and they used the screenplay and dailies from production as inspiration while they worked on songs for the film. Shields commented on the challenge he felt in songwriting for a film, saying "I was barely aware of the language of music that's not essentially just for your ears. ... In the end, just the physical movement of the film, that was a delicacy. And I suppose that's why I ended up doing stuff that was so delicate."

King argues that music often plays the most significant role in setting mood and tone in the film, writing that it is substantial "in evoking the dreamy, narcotised, semi-detached impressions of jet-lag" as well as broader feelings of alienation and disconnection, "making what is probably the largest single contribution to the widespread understanding of the film as a 'mood piece'." He points to the use of "Girls" by Death in Vegas, featured in the early sequence in which Bob is driven from the airport to the hotel, arguing that it "plays a role equal to if not dominating that of the visuals ..., creating a drifting, ethereal and somewhat dreamy quality that precisely captures the impressions of temporal and spatial disjunction". He also points to the use of "cool and distant" tracks like "Tommib", used in the extended sequence featuring Charlotte observing Tokyo while seated in her hotel room window, as playing a significant role in establishing feelings of isolation and disorientation in the character. In King's view, some sequences feature combinations of music and visuals so as to function as "audio-visual set pieces", which offer distinct points of appeal in the film for its target audience.

== Release ==
=== Marketing ===
Coppola did not sell distribution rights for the United States and Canada until she and Flack finished editing the film. In February 2003, the director showed the film to top executives at the domestic arm of Focus Features, the company to which it had already sold most of the foreign distribution. The prior contract proved to be significant for Focus, as it received privileged access to the film while competing buyers complained that they were restricted to the viewing of a three-minute trailer in the Focus offices at the American Film Market. Coppola initially offered the domestic distribution rights for $5 million, but she decided to sell them to Focus for $4 million, citing her appreciation for the international deals the company had secured for the film.

Once Focus was involved, it began promoting the film by employing a conventional "indie-style" marketing campaign. The strategy involved generating positive word of mouth for the film well before its September 2003 release. The distributor arranged advance press screenings throughout the summer of 2003 and combined this with a magazine publicity campaign. (Note: For one example of a magazine article cited by Focus as being part of this campaign, see Hirschberg 2003.) Posters and trailers emphasized the recognizable star presence of Murray, highlighting his performance in the film's comic sequences, which favored wider audience appeal. Immediately prior to its release, Focus placed Lost in Translation in film festivals and hosted "intimate media screenings" that included question-and-answer panels with Coppola and Murray. Many of these marketing tacks were designed to promote the film at minimal cost, a departure from more costly strategies often employed in the Hollywood mainstream, such as major television advertising.

=== Theatrical run ===
Lost in Translation had its premiere on August 29, 2003, at the Telluride Film Festival in the United States. Over the next week, it appeared at the 60th Venice International Film Festival and the 2003 Toronto International Film Festival. It opened to the public in limited release on September 12, 2003, at 23 theaters in major cities in the United States. The film had already generated speculation about Oscar contention from advance screenings and was noted for opening several weeks earlier than expected for an indie vying for awards—a risk being that opening too early might cause the film to be forgotten by the time nominations were made for major prizes like the Academy Awards. Focus Features co-presidents James Schamus and David Linde commented that the company chose an early release date on the basis of factors including the film's quality and early marketing campaign, as well as a lack of competition from other films. The strategy was intended to give Lost in Translation more time to command the marketplace.

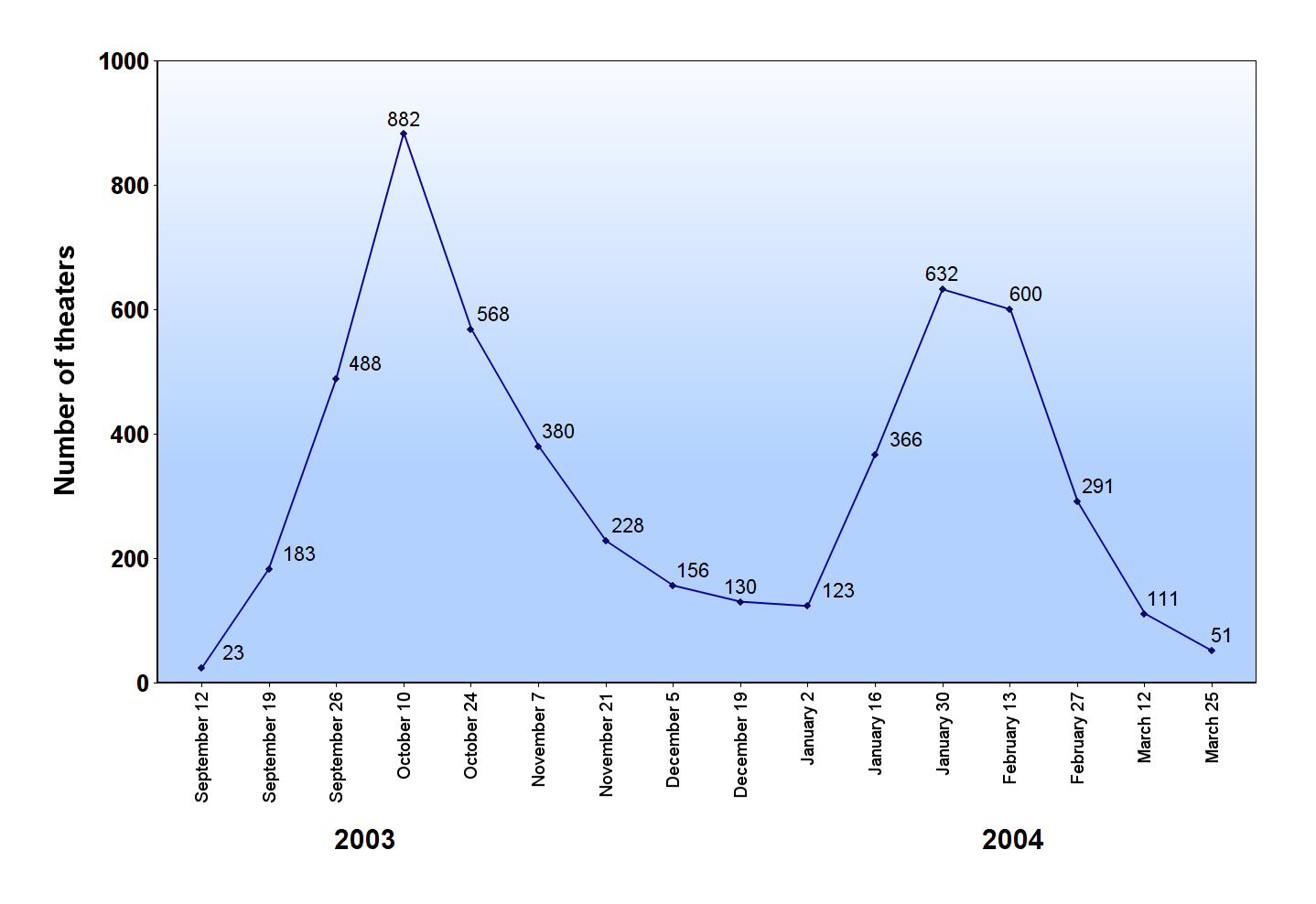
Graph showing the estimated number of theaters in which Lost in Translation played in the United States, Canada, and Puerto Rico in 2003–2004. Focus Features expanded its theater presence in January after it received nominations for the 76th Academy Awards.

The film grossed $925,000 in its opening weekend and was expanded the next week from 23 theaters to 183 in the top 25 markets of the country. There, it grossed more than $2.62 million over the weekend and nearly paid off the total budget of the film. It entered wide release on October 3, (Note: "Wide release" is defined here as crossing the 600-theater threshold.) its fourth weekend, peaking at a rank of seven in the box office chart; a week later, it expanded to an estimated 882 theaters, the film's highest theater count over its run. Lost in Translation grossed an estimated to-date total of $18.5 million through October 13 and was noted by The Hollywood Reporter to have been performing well even "in smaller and medium-sized markets where audiences don't always respond to this type of upscale material". Following this performance, Lost in Translation saw a gradual decline in theater presence progressing into the new year, though it was expanded again after the film received nominations for the 76th Academy Awards. The film was widened from a late December low of 117 theaters to an estimated 632 at the end of January, ultimately ending its run in the United States and Canada on March 25 and earning $44.6 million. Its international release earned $74.1 million, for a worldwide total of $119 million.

=== Home media ===
The DVD of Lost in Translation was released on February 3, 2004 by Universal Studios Home Video, and includes deleted scenes, a behind-the-scenes featurette, a conversation about the film featuring Murray and Coppola, and a music video for "City Girl", one of the original songs composed for the film by Kevin Shields. Wanting to capitalize on the publicity surrounding Lost in Translation's presence at the Academy Awards, Focus Features made the unusual move of releasing the film on home media while it was still screening in theaters, immediately after its Oscar nominations were announced. The strategy was seen as risky, as the industry was generally concerned that theatrical revenues could be harmed by early home video release. Lost in Translation ultimately earned nearly $5 million from its first five days of video rentals and sold one million retail copies during its first week of release. Early returns showed it was the second-best selling DVD during this period while the film screened in 600 theaters and box office revenues dropped 19% from the previous week, which Variety described as "relatively modest". Focus credited the performance to positive word of mouth and cited the marketing for the film on both media as helpful for whichever platform consumers chose.

Lost in Translation was later released on the now-obsolete HD DVD format on May 29, 2007, and on Blu-ray on December 7, 2010. In June 2023, Kino Lorber announced it would release the film on Ultra HD Blu-ray, but the release was cancelled in early 2025, with a post on Kino Lorber's X account saying, "it was becoming [a] very complicated release with lots of people to please."

== Reception ==
=== Critical response ===
Lost in Translation received acclaim, particularly for Murray's performance and for Coppola's direction and screenplay. On Rotten Tomatoes, the film has an approval rating of 95% based on 234 reviews, with an average rating of 8.8/10. The site's critical consensus reads, "Effectively balancing humor and subtle pathos, Sofia Coppola crafts a moving, melancholy story that serves as a showcase for both Bill Murray and Scarlett Johansson." On Metacritic, which assigns a rating to reviews, the film has an average score of 91 out of 100 based on 44 reviews, indicating "universal acclaim".

Critics praised Murray's performance as Bob, commending his handling of a more serious role that was combined with the comic persona for which he was already broadly known. Edelstein argued that it was "the Bill Murray performance we've been waiting for", adding that "his two halves have never come together as they do here, in a way that connects that hilarious detachment with the deep and abiding sense of isolation that must have spawned it". Lisa Schwarzbaum of Entertainment Weekly regarded Murray's performance as Oscar-worthy and lauded it as his "most vulnerable and unmannered" to date; she praised his treatment of a more delicate role as well as his improvisations in the film's comic sequences. Roger Ebert gave Lost in Translation four out of four stars and named it the second best film of the year, describing it as "sweet and sad at the same time as it is sardonic and funny". The New York Times critic Elvis Mitchell had similar praise, calling Lost in Translation "Mr. Murray's movie" and remarking that the actor "supplies the kind of performance that seems so fully realized and effortless that it can easily be mistaken for not acting at all". (Note: In the bonus features of the film's 2004 DVD, Murray called Lost in Translation his favorite film that he has appeared in.)

Coppola received acclaim for her screenplay and direction. Kenneth Turan of the Los Angeles Times commented that Lost in Translation was "tart and sweet, unmistakably funny and exceptionally well observed—[which] marks ... Coppola as a mature talent with a distinctive sensibility and the means to express it". Much of the praise was directed specifically at her attention to qualities of subtlety and atmosphere; David Rooney of Variety praised the film as "a mood piece", adding that its "deft balance of humor and poignancy makes it both a pleasurable and melancholy experience". Likewise, Salon critic Stephanie Zacharek lauded Coppola as a "stealth dramatist" whose understated narrative style made for an artful depiction of emotion; she praised Lost in Translation as an intimate story that marks Coppola as an exceptional filmmaker.

In his review for The New York Observer, Andrew Sarris called the film "that rarity of rarities, a grown-up romance based on the deliberate repression of sexual gratification ... when independent films are exploding with erotic images edging ever closer to outright pornography, Ms. Coppola and her colleagues have replaced sexual facility with emotional longing, without being too coy or self-congratulatory in the process." USA Today gave the film three and a half stars out of four and wrote that it "offers quiet humor in lieu of the bludgeoning direct assaults most comedies these days inflict". Time's Richard Corliss praised Murray's performance: "You won't find a subtler, funnier or more poignant performance this year than this quietly astonishing turn." His performance has been likened to the sardonic persona of W.C. Fields. In his review for The Observer, Philip French wrote: "While Lost in Translation is deeply sad and has a strongly Antonioniesque flavour, it's also a wispy romantic comedy with little plot and some well-observed comic moments." In The Guardian, Joe Queenan praised Coppola's film as "one of the few Hollywood films I have seen this year that has a brain; but more than that, it has a soul." Rolling Stone's Peter Travers gave it four out of four stars and wrote: "Before saying goodbye, they whisper something to each other that the audience can't hear. Coppola keeps her film as hushed and intimate as that whisper. Lost in Translation is found gold. Funny how a wisp of a movie from a wisp of a girl can wipe you out." J. Hoberman, in his review for the Village Voice, wrote: "Lost in Translation is as bittersweet a brief encounter as any in American movies since Richard Linklater's equally romantic Before Sunrise. But Lost in Translation is the more poignant reverie. Coppola evokes the emotional intensity of a one-night stand far from home—but what she really gets is the magic of movies".

Praise was also offered for Johansson's performance as Charlotte; Rooney commented that she "gives a smartly restrained performance as an observant, questioning woman with a rich interior life", and Turan added that Johansson "makes what could have been an overly familiar characterization come completely alive".

=== Criticism and accusations of racism ===
Critics have argued that Lost in Translation is racist and perpetuates Orientalism, and that its tropes and visual framing rely on ethnic humor, stereotypes of East Asians, Orientalist imagery, and the dehumanization of Japanese characters.

On January 31, 2004, the Asian American and Pacific Islander (AAPI) organization Asia Media Watch sponsored and launched a nationwide campaign to petition motion picture industry groups, including the Academy of Motion Picture Arts and Sciences, Directors Guild of America, Screen Actors Guild, and Writers Guild of America, to vote against the film Lost In Translation in all awards categories at the 76th Academy Awards. The initiative ultimately had little impact on the Academy Awards due to the dominant sweep of The Lord of the Rings: The Return of the King, which won eleven awards, including Best Picture and Best Director. However, spokesperson suggested that because some voters who were lobbied agreed to return their promotional screening DVDs for refunds, the campaign may have influenced voting at the 10th Screen Actors Guild Awards, where Lost in Translation star Bill Murray, who was previously considered the favorite for Outstanding Performance by a Male Actor in a Leading Role, was defeated by Johnny Depp for his role in Pirates of the Caribbean: The Curse of the Black Pearl. The organization insisted that the film "dehumanizes the Japanese people by portraying them as a collection of shallow stereotypes who are treated with disregard and disdain," claiming that such portrayals, lack of cultural sensitivity and perpetual foreigner stereotypes led to discrimination against Asian Americans in the United States, where a significant minority of the population already holds anti-Asian sentiment.

In The Guardian, ethnomusicologist Kiku Day wrote: "There is only one type of humor in the film that I could see: anti-Japanese racism, which is its very spine … There is no scene where the Japanese are afforded a shred of dignity. The viewer is sledgehammered into laughing at these small, yellow people and their funny ways." In The National Post, Robert Fulford criticized the film: “Lost in Translation expresses a distasteful racism through romantic comedy. It says, as racists often do, that foreigners, in this case Japanese, are inherently comic and stupid ... It's a film that prides itself on its own provincialism.” Filmmaker E. Koohan Paik argued: "The Japanese are presented not as people, but as clowns ... We laugh at them, not with them. This is why the film is accused of being racist." Paik wrote that it is "the shirking of responsibility to depict them as full human beings, either negative or positive, which constitutes discrimination, or racism." In IndieWire, Peter Brunette wrote "Since all the jokes are at the expense of the Japanese—'these people are, really, just SO weird!!'—the humor grates after a while, especially the ancient jokes about the Japanese tendency to reverse 'r' and 'l' when speaking English."

Anthony Quinn of The Independent criticized the presence of "a trace of lumpen-tourist condescension—I am speaking perfect English. Why can't these funny little people understand me?" Slate critic David Edelstein wrote "Charlotte asks Bob why the Japanese mix up their l’s and r’s and he says, 'for yucks' ... But they’re our yucks, at their expense. It’s bad enough to make fun of Japanese for their English in English-speaking countries. But in Japan? The sense of otherness and of cultural superiority merges uncomfortably." Film director Robert Allan Ackerman accused the film of racism, stating that he "thought that it had nothing to do with Japan; they could have been on the moon, and the only reason to have Japanese people was to make fun of them."

The New York Times reported that public debate regarding the film's depiction of ethnic stereotypes and its potential reception among Japanese audiences began prior to its May 2004 release in Japan. Off-the-record comments from Japanese film distribution executives reflected uncertainty over how local audiences would respond. In analytical coverage of the film's reception in Japan, it was reported that some of the Japanese crew members found the film deeply insulting including a waiter at the 52nd-floor New York Bar and Grill, who appeared as himself in the film. Yoshio Tsuchiya of The Yomiuri Shimbun wrote that Coppola's representation of Japan was "heavily stereotypical and discriminatory." In The Asahi Shimbun, film critic Kotaro Sawaki said he “felt unusual revulsion against this movie ... All the Japanese are consistently portrayed as foolish. But the movie fails to point out that what appears to be foolish mirrors the viewer’s own foolishness.” Michiko Shiraishi, a New York correspondent for Jiji Press, wrote that "Japanese might feel they were betrayed by ‘their true friends,’ Americans.”

In response to accusations of racism, producer Ross Katz defended the film, stating he believed "Sofia's love of Japan and love of the people that she's met there is incredibly evident in the film." Katz added that none of the scenes in the film were "any slight to Japanese people." Director Sofia Coppola stated: "I can see why people might think that, but I know I'm not racist. I think if everything's based on truth you can make fun, have a little laugh, but also be respectful of a culture. I just love Tokyo and I'm not mean-spirited ... I think that everything you do, people could be offended by—unless you're just trying to be nice about everyone." Coppola also stated: "Even on our daily call sheets, they would mix up the 'rs' and the 'ls'—all that was from experience, it's not made up. I guess someone has misunderstood my intentions. It bugs me, because I know I'm not racist."

=== Accolades ===
Lost in Translation received awards and nominations in a variety of categories, particularly for Coppola's direction and screenwriting, as well as the performances of Murray and Johansson. At the 76th Academy Awards, it won Best Original Screenplay (Coppola) and the film received three further nominations for Best Picture, Best Director (Coppola), and Best Actor (Murray). The film garnered three Golden Globe Awards from five nominations: Best Motion Picture – Musical or Comedy, Best Actor – Motion Picture Musical or Comedy, and Best Screenplay. At the 57th British Academy Film Awards, Lost in Translation won three awards: Best Actor in a Leading Role, Best Actress in a Leading Role (Johansson), and Best Editing (Flack).

Lost in Translation also received awards from various foreign award ceremonies, film festivals, and critics' organizations. These include Best American Film at the 58th Bodil Awards, Best Foreign Film at the 30th César Awards, and Best Foreign Film at the Film Critics Circle of Australia Awards 2004, French Syndicate of Cinema Critics Awards, and the German Film Awards, as well as the Nastro d'Argento for Best Foreign Director. The film also won Independent Spirit Awards for Best Film, Best Director, Best Actor and Best Screenplay at the 19th Independent Spirit Awards, as well as Best Film – Comedy or Musical, Best Actor – Comedy or Musical and Best Original Screenplay at the 8th Golden Satellite Awards, and two prizes at the Venice International Film Festival. From critics' organizations, Lost in Translation received a number of awards including Best Film and Best Actor at the San Francisco Film Critics Circle Awards 2003, Best Film, Best Actor and Best Screenplay (tied with Denys Arcand for The Barbarian Invasions) at the Toronto Film Critics Association Awards 2003, and Best Film at the Vancouver Film Critics Circle Awards 2003. The Los Angeles Film Critics Association voted Bill Murray best actor of the year at the 29th LAFCA Awards and the National Society of Film Critics also awarded Murray best actor at the 38th NSFC Awards. The New York Film Critics Circle also voted Murray best actor and Sofia Coppola best director at the 69th New York Film Critics Circle Awards. Coppola received an award for special filmmaking achievement from the National Board of Review at the 75th NBR Awards where the film also placed on their Top Ten Films list.

== Analysis ==
=== Themes ===
He was trapped. ... When you go to a foreign country, truly foreign, there is a major shock of consciousness that comes on you when you see that, "Oh God, it's just me here." There's nobody, no neighbors, no friends, no phone calls—just room service.

— Bill Murray, speaking about Bob Harris

The film's writer-director, Sofia Coppola, has described Lost in Translation as a story about "things being disconnected and looking for moments of connection", a perspective that has been shared by critics and scholars. In a cultural sense, Bob and Charlotte are disoriented by feelings of jet lag and culture shock as a result of foreign travel to Japan. Bob is bewildered by his interactions with a Japanese commercial director whom he cannot understand, realizing that the meaning of his communication is "lost in translation" by an interpreter. (Note: This scene is an homage to a Suntory commercial Coppola's father, Francis Ford Coppola, shot with Akira Kurosawa in the 1970s. Coppola said that like Bob, Murray did not understand what the man playing the director was saying. She remarked that "I like the fact that the American actors don't really know what's going on, just like the characters.") Moreover, both are sleepless from a change in time zone, choosing to cope with their wakefulness by making late-night visits to the hotel bar. Such feelings provoke a sense of estrangement from their environment, but they also exacerbate deeper experiences of alienation and disconnection in their lives. Bob and Charlotte are both in troubled marriages and facing similar crises of identity, as Charlotte is unsure of what to do with her life and questions what role she should embrace in the world, while Bob is invariably reminded of his fading stature as a movie star and feels disassociated from the identity by which he is already defined.

Such experiences are heightened by the characters' contact with the city environment of Tokyo. Bob feels alienated by seeing his likeness used in an advertisement while he is driven from the airport to his hotel, and the colorful cityscape is rendered as a frenetic environment by which he is overwhelmed. (Note: Some commentators have described Tokyo itself as a third major character in the film. For examples, see San Filippo 2003, p. 28, and Plate 2004, para. 4.) Charlotte feels adrift as she attempts to find meaning while wandering Tokyo, and feels isolated as she peers over the city from her hotel room window. The Park Hyatt Tokyo offers hermetic qualities that insulate the characters from the city and is the site Bob chooses to seek refuge from his ails. These shared impressions of alienation create common ground for Bob and Charlotte to cultivate a personal connection. When Charlotte invites Bob to experience the Tokyo nightlife, she reduces his sense of distance from the city and the two develop a connection based on small moments together. In the little time they have together, each realize they are not alone in seeking a sense of something deeper in their lives. Coppola, speaking about the brief nature of their encounter, remarked, "For everyone, there are those moments when you have great days with someone you wouldn't expect to. Then you have to go back to your real lives, but it makes an impression on you. It's what makes it so great and enjoyable."

Geoff King, a scholar who wrote a book about the film, comments that the experiences of the central characters are one factor that lends Lost in Translation to varied interpretations by academics. Todd McGowan reads the film from a Lacanian psychoanalytic perspective, arguing that the film encourages the embrace of "absence" in one's life and relationships. He describes Coppola's depiction of Tokyo "as a city bubbling over with excess", which offers an empty promise of gratification. In his view, both Bob and Charlotte recognize that they cannot find meaning in Tokyo's attractions, so they bond over their shared sense of emptiness in them. Lucy Bolton offers a feminist reading, arguing that Lost in Translation evokes the thought of feminist philosopher Luce Irigaray by highlighting issues of young womanhood. She argues that the film provides a complex portrait of Charlotte's female subjectivity and an optimistic rendering of the character's pursuit for individual expression.

=== Narrative ===
Lost in Translation has been broadly examined in terms of its narrative structure, with commentators noting that it contains few plot events as compared with films in the Hollywood mainstream. Narrative events are mostly focused on the development of Bob and Charlotte's relationship, with few "external" obstacles that impact the central characters. King notes, "More time is taken to evoke the impressions, feelings, and experiences of the central characters", which represents "a shift in the hierarchical arrangement of [film elements]" that prioritizes character experiences over plot. The literary critic Steve Vineberg argues that "the links of the story are indeed there, only they're not typical cause-and-effect connections. They're formed by the emotions that gather at the end of one episode and pour into the next". King maintains that while the plot does progress according to a basic linear causality, "If the episodic quality often seems to the fore, this is partly a matter of the pacing of individual sequences that are very often leisurely and dedicated to the establishment or development of mood and atmospherics". Coppola said she wanted the story to emphasize the qualities of an intimate moment, and she did not want to impose grandiose narrative devices on the characters such as "a war keeping them apart". (Note: Coppola has acknowledged her appreciation for "meandering mood pieces" and cited influences for Lost in Translation from films such as L'Avventura, La Dolce Vita, and In the Mood for Love. La Dolce Vita is briefly featured by Coppola in a scene in which Bob and Charlotte are watching the film on television while drinking sake.)

Lost in Translation has also been noted for defying the conventions of mainstream romantic films. Film historian Wendy Haslem writes that the classic romantic comedy assures the audience that the couple has a future, but Coppola defies expectations by refusing to unite the central characters. She points to elements such as Bob and Charlotte's lack of sexual consummation as one factor that obscures whether their pairing is more romantic or platonic. Writing about the concluding sequence in which the characters make their final goodbyes, Haslem argues, "Conventionally in mainstream cinema, the kiss ... signifies resolution by reinforcing the myth of romantic love. But in this new wave of contemporary anti-romance romance, the kiss signifies ambiguity." The academic Nicholas Y.B. Wong contends that the film's lack of "heart-melting connections and melodramatic (re)unions between characters" represents a postmodern portrait of love, writing that Lost in Translation is "about non-love, the predominance of affairs and the complexities of intimacy. Characters vacillate between falling in love and out of love. They are neither committed to someone nor emotionally unattached." Coppola said Bob and Charlotte's relationship is "supposed to be romantic but on the edge. ... [A] little bit more than friends but not an actual romance. ... To me, it's pretty un-sexual between them—innocent and romantic, and a friendship."

The academic Maria San Filippo wrote that the "retreat into America-centrism would be disappointing if, again, it were not so truthful ... Coppola knows firsthand that American tourists rarely get to know any Japanese well enough to discover their depth as sympathetic human beings."

=== Opening shot ===
The opening shot (Note: Johansson was initially apprehensive about wearing sheer panties for the shot, but she conceded after Coppola showed her what they looked like by modeling them personally. Johansson said that a male director would not have been able to convince her to wear them.)

The film's opening shot, a 36-second take of Charlotte's lower back and buttocks as she lies on a bed wearing semi-transparent pink panties and a gray sweater with white T-shirt underneath, as the credits begin to roll, has been another point of discussion among critics and scholars. It is based on the photorealist paintings of John Kacere and has often been compared to the initial appearance of Brigitte Bardot's character Camille Javal in the 1963 film Contempt. (Note: For examples, see Kennedy 2010, pp. 46–47, San Filippo 2003, p. 26, and Haslem 2004.)

Slate critic David Edelstein called the scene the only "head-scratcher" in the film, which he otherwise appreciated:

The meaning of this image is less transparent than Johansson's attire, but my guess is that Coppola wants us to see the whole film as the vaguely erotic dream of an alienated young woman. She wants to make this woman's detachment from this culture, and from her own body, hypnotically sexy, and to put the longing for human connection into your bloodstream from the first frame. But I was mostly thinking about her butt crack.

It has been described as a foreshadowing of a romance between Bob and Charlotte, (Note: For example, see Smith, Paul Julian (2004). "Tokyo Drifters". Sight & Sound. Vol. 14, no. 1. p. 13.) but other writers have a different interpretation. Correspondingly, the academic Maria San Filippo maintains that "[Coppola] doesn't seem to be making a statement at all beyond a sort of endorsement of beauty for beauty's sake." King notes that the image contains both "subtle" and "obvious" appeal in its combination of aesthetic and erotic qualities, which signifies Lost in Translation's position between mainstream and independent film.

Film scholar Todd Kennedy interprets it in terms of an invocation and inversion of feminist film theorist Laura Mulvey's conception of the male gaze, arguing that the shot "lasts so long as to become awkward—forcing the audience to become aware of (and potentially even question) their participation in the gaze". Other critics also see it as inherently subverting the objectification of Charlotte. Haslem argues that "Coppola's intention with this opening shot appears to be to defy taboos and to undermine expectations surrounding what might be considered the 'money shot' in more traditionally exploitative cinema." Bolton points out that Charlotte's "state of undress is not designed to be seen by anyone else, as she is alone in the room. Her solitary, meditative state de-sexualizes her appearance by naturalizing her appearance as the state of undress a woman would be likely to adopt if she was on her own." Fiona Handyside elaborates on Kennedy's notion, that the stillness of the image reduces its voyeuristic appeal and "the very weight of time pulls [Charlotte] from being pure empty iconic spectacle and into the material matter of history itself".

"I don't have a really good reason for it", Coppola said when asked to explain the shot. "It's just how I wanted to start the movie. I liked having a hint of the character—a sweet, young girl waiting around in her hotel room—and then go into the story." Suzanne Ferriss, a film scholar who has written extensively about Coppola's work, notes that in the original screenplay, the film opened with Harris's arrival and then went to Charlotte in the hotel. Due to this change, Coppola's comment belies the complexity of the shot. Ferriss observes that the first 10 seconds lead the audience to believe it might be looking at a still, until Charlotte shifts her upper leg:

... [linking] moving and still images, demonstrating an awareness of fine art tradition and a recognition that film is, in fact, a series of still images projected at 24 frames per second. Second, it highlights cinema's unique ability to make meaning through editing ... The film's opening is a bold assertion of cinema's status as an art, like the painting it references, references, or literature, which similarly relies on the audience's imaginative engagement to find meaning...

=== Ending and the whisper ===
The film's concluding scene—in which Bob and Charlotte embrace in a Tokyo street and he whispers inaudibly in her ear—has generated sustained commentary over two decades. Coppola said she did not write the line, and that Murray said it was "something that should stay between them".

Viewers have attempted to determine the words, including a 2007 video that claimed to isolate the dialogue by digitally enhancing the soundtrack. Entertainment Weekly highlighted the clip while cautioning that its accuracy was uncertain. Neither Coppola nor the actors have endorsed any transcription, and subsequent criticism has emphasized that the unknowability of the line is integral to the ending.

=== Whiteness and Orientalism ===
Lost in Translation has been analysed in terms of its representation of race and whiteness. King draws on Richard Dyer's analysis of whiteness as a cultural construct often treated in Western discourse as a neutral or universal norm. King argues that Charlotte is characterized as distinctly white, with her pale complexion, soft lighting, and youthful appearance associating her with freshness, innocence, and purity. This presentation contrasts with Bob's more weathered appearance and reflects historical associations between white femininity and purity in Western racial and imperialist discourses.

King further argues that the film's racial implications operate at a structural level and need not reflect conscious authorial intent though Sofia Coppola may not have intended to stereotype Japanese characters, their representation may nevertheless reproduce Orientalist assumptions. Drawing on Reina Lewis's analysis of women's contributions to nineteenth-century European Orientalism, King also considers how gender shapes representations of the East. Lewis argues that women's position within colonial hierarchies, alongside their subordinate status within European gender relations, could produce a feminised form of Orientalism combining observation with fantasy.

King also argued that the film's portrayal of Japanese people and relies on racial stereotyping. King argued that the film's humor is derived from the physical appearance, cultural practices, and limited English proficiency of the Japanese characters, writing:

A good deal of the comedy offered by Lost in Translation seems to rely on rather cheap and obvious stereotypes, in a manner that is somewhat surprising and out of tune with its broader positioning in the film- cultural landscape. A number of verbal jokes are based around the tendency of Japanese characters to render what should be ‘r’ sounds as ‘l’ sounds ... A similar number of visual jokes relate to the diminutive stature of many Japanese people, some of which do not seem to make much sense other than as arbitrary mocking. Bob bends uncomfortably to get beneath a shower head that is fixed too low and apparently cannot be adjusted sufficiently upwards, for example, although the pole to which it is attached seems to have plenty of further height capacity ... The lack of any other motivation for such examples makes them appear to be egregious cases of crude stereotyping, in search of cheap laughs.

King wrote that the film emphasizes the stereotypes of Japanese people as "crazy" or "extreme" in scenes such as the one with the prostitute who visits Bob in his hotel room and the chat-show host with whom Bob appears on television. King noted that Japanese characters exist only as a backdrop to support the main characters rather than as fully realized individuals: "There are some more ‘normal’- seeming Japanese characters, principally some of those with whom Bob and Charlotte socialise on their first night of escape from the hotel, although their nature seems in this context to be shaped by their background function in relationship to the particular experience undergone at the time by the protagonists rather than being given any space to exist in its own right." He concluded that: "most Japanese are presented as objects for the amusement of the viewer."

Homay King, a scholar, accused the film of Orientalism stating that, "Lost in Translation makes but minimal efforts to rewrite the myths of Asia that Hollywood film has been recycling for nearly a century: the Orient as primitive, feminized, and eroticized; Asian citizens as alternately silly or perilous, enigmatic and cloaked in artifice." She also noted that the film fails to establish the perspective from which Japanese representations are made, writing that "the film [does not] sufficiently clarify that its real subject is not Tokyo itself, but Western perceptions of Tokyo ... When Japan appears superficial, inappropriately erotic, or unintelligible, we are never completely sure whether this vision belongs to Coppola, to her characters, or simply to a Hollywood cinematic imaginary."

The academic Kendra Marston argues that the narrative primarily centers on whiteness, "the soul searching of the white American characters," contrasting this focus with what she characterizes as a "heavily stereotyped depiction" of local Japanese characters. According to Marston, "the 'unknowability' of the Tokyo environment aids in perpetuating a cinematic mood characterized by sustained periods of white melancholia." Marston further identifies the specific emotional undercurrent within the film as a "painful yet pleasurable neurasthenia, experienced only by the white and privileged, that the protagonists are unable to alleviate," writing:

The allure of the exotic Other occupies a source of transient fantasy that remains in the realm of wishful thinking, never promising a lasting transcendence over the melancholic state and yet also importantly working to preserve the text’s primary interest in the mysterious nature and nostalgic idealization of white feminine identity.

== Legacy ==
Lost in Translation was listed as a best film of 2003 by numerous critics. Roger Ebert added it to his "great movies" list on his website. Director Quentin Tarantino included Lost in Translation in his list of top 20 films released since 1992, when his career as a filmmaker began. It has since been commonly ranked by critics as one of the greatest films of the 2000s and 21st century. (Note: Attributed to multiple sources.) In 2021, members of the Writers Guild of America West and Writers Guild of America, East ranked its screenplay 19th on their list of the 101 greatest screenplays of the 21st century to date.

In 2024, director Sofia Coppola acknowledged that some depictions of the Japanese characters didn’t age well, stating, "It was a different time … I haven't thought about how I would approach it now, but probably not in the same way." In a retrospective interview with The Guardian, Akiko Monou, who played P chan, noted that "some of the Japanese characters—such as the commercial director shouting at Murray—were a little… exaggerated." Similarly, retrospectives published around the film's 20th anniversary emphasized its enduring cultural footprint and debated aspects of its representation. Commentators noted that the movie helped refresh international fascination with Tokyo while acknowledging that some depictions of Japanese people have aged poorly. In Pacific Citizen, a newspaper published by the Japanese American Citizens League (JACL), Gil Asakawa criticized the film for mocking Japanese accents, food and customs, writing: “Murray, in particular, displays such an awful sense of privilege and superiority that it’s hard to watch. He represents the worst of Americans that I’ve seen in Japan.” Writing for The Michigan Daily in 2016, Vanessa Wong characterized the film as "grossly offensive." Wong contextualized Lost in Translation within the history of Hollywood's depiction of East Asians, writing, "After all, 60 years ago, Katherine Hepburn was prancing around in yellowface for 'Dragon Seed.'" In 2017, MTV revisited Lost in Translation as “an insufferable, racist mess,” and in 2021, The Stanford Daily’s Nadia Jo inventoried the film’s “egregious” offenses, starting with how it forced viewers to “adopt the white gaze and look down on another race.” Jo argued that "Lost in Translation reinforces negative stereotypes of Asians, contributing to systemic racism and the false notion often perpetuated by movies that only white people have complex lives and thoughts." Bloomberg's Gearoid Reidy wrote on the film's 20th anniversary in 2023: "The movie’s obsession with Japanese pronunciation of Rs and Ls, most famously with the sex worker who visits Harris’s room, has aged quite badly — especially as neither of the main characters attempts to learn much Japanese beyond kanpai ... None of the Japanese characters have any agency; all of them are stereotypes." In 2024, Morgan Giles wrote for The Times Literary Supplement (TLS): “On average the film makes a joke about Japanese accents every twelve minutes (and let’s not even mention the jokes about height) ... even in 2003, those jokes just weren’t funny any more.” In a 2024 retrospective for Tokyo Weekender, Cezary Jan Strusiewicz compared the characters' behavior of "letting Tokyo be their playground" to contemporary issues with overtourism and disruptive tourists in Japan. Strusiewicz remarked that "there's no way [Coppola] could have predicted that foreigners being annoying in public would become a problem in Japan in 20 years."

The film has remained closely associated with the Park Hyatt Tokyo—especially its New York Bar—which became a recurring destination for visitors seeking to recreate scenes from the movie. Coverage marking the movie’s anniversary described the hotel as having “been Tokyo’s most famous luxury hotel” since the film and noted that guests still visit for that connection.

The line “For relaxing times, make it Suntory time,” delivered by Murray’s character in a whisky commercial, became a widely quoted catchphrase in U.S. media and helped cement the association between the film and Japanese whisky in the popular imagination. In 2023, the House of Suntory marked its centennial with an anniversary spot directed by Coppola and starring Keanu Reeves that explicitly nodded to the film and its “Suntory time” legacy.

Critics and profiles at the time also identified the film as a major career turning point for Scarlett Johansson, signaling her transition to adult roles and mainstream stardom.

== See also ==
- Portrayal of East Asians in Hollywood
- "City Girl", a music video done with material that Sofia Coppola did not use in the film.
- Her, directed by Coppola's ex-husband, Spike Jonze, and also starring Scarlett Johansson; it shares similar themes of loneliness, human connection, and the search for meaning in the modern world.
- Sidonie in Japan, French film with Isabelle Huppert in 2024.
- List of cult films
