= Swastika Eyes =

1999 single by Primal Scream

Single by Primal Scream

from the album XTRMNTR
- Released: 8 November 1999
- Genre: Techno; electronic rock; house
- Length: 8:10 (Jagz Kooner mix); 7:05 (Chemical Brothers mix)
- Label: Creation
- Songwriter: Primal Scream
- Producers: Jagz Kooner, the Chemical Brothers

Primal Scream singles chronology
"If They Move, Kill 'Em" (1998)	"Swastika Eyes" (1999)	"Kill All Hippies" (2000)

"Swastika Eyes" (stylised as "SWSTK YS" and also known as "War Pigs") is a song by Scottish rock band Primal Scream, released on 8 November 1999 as the lead single from their sixth studio album XTRMNTR (2000). The attention-grabbing title is an example of the band's confrontational style in this period, although they have stated that the song is an attack on corporations and governments. The song peaked at number 22 on the UK Singles Chart.

The "Swastika Eyes" single has two mixes of the song by the Chemical Brothers and Jagz Kooner respectively. Both mixes were included on the album XTRMNTR. The Spectre Mix by Kooner was listed as Jagz Kooner mix on the album. The song was on the soundtrack of the 2004 film Football Factory.

== Reception ==
Reviewing a live show from the XTRMNTR tour, Guardian critic Dave Simpson compared the song to the work of D.A.F.

A December 2025 live performance of "Swastika Eyes" at the Roundhouse in London drew controversy for visuals of Israeli prime minister Benjamin Netanyahu showing the Star of David combined with a swastika in his eyes. It was followed by slogans such as "stop genocide", "free Palestine" and "our government is complicit". After the Met Police was contacted, the venue apologised to the Jewish community for the "highly offensive" graphics.

== Track listings ==
12-inch and cassette single
No.	Title	Length
1.	"Swastika Eyes" (Chemical Brothers mix)	7:09
2.	"Swastika Eyes" (Spectre mix)	8:10

CD single
No.	Title	Length
1.	"Swastika Eyes" (Chemical Brothers mix)	7:09
2.	"Swastika Eyes" (Spectre mix)	8:10
3.	"Swastika Eyes" (edit)	4:01

Japanese CD maxi-single
No.	Title	Length
1.	"Swastika Eyes" (Chemical Brothers mix)	7:09
2.	"Swastika Eyes" (David Holmes mix)	6:01
3.	"Swastika Eyes" (Spectre mix)	8:10
4.	"Swastika Eyes" (edit)	4:01

== Charts ==
Chart (1999)	Peak position
Australia (ARIA)	71
Europe (Eurochart Hot 100)	77
Scottish Singles Sales (Official Charts)	17
UK Singles (Official Charts)	22
UK Indie (Official Charts)	4

== Release history ==
Region	Date	Format(s)	Label(s)	Ref.
United Kingdom	8 November 1999	12-inch vinyl; CD; cassette	Creation	
Japan	26 November 1999	CD	Creation; Epic	
