= Kill All Hippies =

2000 single by Primal Scream

Single by Primal Scream

from the album XTRMNTR
- B-side: "The Revenge of the Hammond Connection"
- Released: 20 March 2000
- Genre: Electronic rock; funk rock
- Length: 4:55
- Label: Creation
- Songwriters: Bobby Gillespie; Andrew Innes; Marco Nelson
- Producers: Brendan Lynch; Primal Scream

Primal Scream singles chronology
"Swastika Eyes" (1999)	"Kill All Hippies" (2000)	"Accelerator" (2000)

"Kill All Hippies" is a song by Scottish rock band Primal Scream, released on 20 March 2000 as the second single from their sixth studio album, XTRMNTR. The song has an aggressive, electronically processed sound, with prominent use of sampled drum loops and distorted guitars. Its title is a quote from the 1980 film Out of the Blue and begins with a sample of the line and other quotes from the film spoken by actress Linda Manz. Upon release, the song debuted and peaked at number 24 on the UK Singles Chart and spent one more week in the top 100 before dropping out.

== Reception ==
Reviewing a live show from the XTRMNTR tour, Guardian critic Dave Simpson compared the song to the work of D.A.F.

== Music video ==
A video for the song was directed by Julian Gibbs and Julian House, inspired by House's cover art for the album. It features fragmented footage of approaching war, aggression and combat, such as riot police, vintage military aircraft and hockey players, superimposed on backgrounds of intense blue and orange colour washes, with no faces visible. Several versions were made for different mixes of the album.

== Track listings ==
European 7-inch vinyl single
No.	Title	Length
1.	"Kill All Hippies"	5:01
2.	"The Revenge of the Hammond Connection"	3:35

European 12-inch vinyl single
No.	Title	Length
1.	"Kill All Hippies"	5:01
2.	"The Revenge of the Hammond Connection"	3:35
3.	"Exterminator (Massive Attack remix)"	5:11

UK CD single
No.	Title	Length
1.	"Kill All Hippies"	5:01
2.	"Exterminator (Massive Attack remix)"	5:11
3.	"The Revenge of the Hammond Connection"	3:35

European CD single
No.	Title	Length
1.	"Kill All Hippies"	5:01
2.	"Exterminator (Massive Attack remix)"	5:11
3.	"The Revenge of the Hammond Connection"	3:35
4.	"Kill All Hippies (Brendan Lynch edit)"	4:07

Japanese CD maxi-single
No.	Title	Length
1.	"Kill All Hippies (Brendan Lynch edit)"	4:07
2.	"Kill All Hippies (Two Lone Swordsmen #2)"	5:47
3.	"When the Kingdom Comes"	4:22
4.	"Exterminator (Massive Attack remix)"	5:11
5.	"Exterminator (Jagz Kooner remix)"	5:40
6.	"The Revenge of the Hammond Connection"	3:35

== Charts ==
Chart (2000)	Peak position
Europe (Eurochart Hot 100)	90
Scotland Singles (OCC)	19
UK Singles (OCC)	24
UK Indie (OCC)	3

== Release history ==
Region	Date	Format(s)	Label(s)	Ref.
United Kingdom	20 March 2000	7-inch vinyl; 12-inch vinyl; CD	Creation	
United States	16 May 2000	Alternative radio	Astralwerks	
Japan	26 July 2000	CD	Creation; Epic	
