= Out of the Blue (1980 film) =

Drama film directed by and starring Dennis Hopper

- Directed by: Dennis Hopper
- Screenplay by: Leonard Yakir; Brenda Nielson
- Produced by: Leonard Yakir; Gary Jules Jouvenat
- Starring: Linda Manz; Dennis Hopper; Sharon Farrell; Don Gordon; Raymond Burr
- Cinematography: Marc Champion
- Edited by: Doris Dyck
- Music by: Tom Lavin
- Distributed by: Discovery Films (U.S.); Les Productions Karim (Canada)
- Release dates: May 1980 (Cannes); November 17, 1982 (Los Angeles)
- Running time: 94 minutes
- Countries: United States; Canada
- Language: English

Out of the Blue (released in Canada as No Looking Back) is a 1980 drama film directed by Dennis Hopper, and starring Linda Manz, Hopper, Sharon Farrell, Don Gordon, and Raymond Burr. The film was produced by Leonard Yakir and written by him and Brenda Nielson. Its plot follows a troubled and rebellious teenage girl living in the Pacific Northwest with her dysfunctional mother and alcoholic father. The title is taken from the Neil Young song "My My, Hey Hey (Out of the Blue)", which is also featured in the film.

The film competed for the Palme d'Or at the 1980 Cannes Film Festival, where it was met by controversy for its frank depiction of juvenile delinquency, drug use, and incest.

== Plot ==
Cindy "Cebe" Barnes is a rebellious adolescent tomboy being raised by her heroin-addicted mother, Kathy, in rural British Columbia. Cebe's father, Don, an abusive alcoholic, is serving a prison sentence for a road accident in which he drunkenly crashed his semi-truck into a school bus, killing all of the school children on board; Cebe was in the truck cab with him when the crash occurred. In Don's absence, Kathy has carried on an affair with Paul, the owner of the restaurant where she is employed as a waitress. Don's friend, Charlie, makes lecherous advances toward Cebe, and also forces a sexual relationship with Kathy, to whom he provides heroin.

Cebe finds escapism in idolizing musicians such as Elvis Presley, Sid Vicious, and Johnny Rotten, and spends time alone in her father's wrecked semi-truck, which has been left abandoned on her family's property. She seeks further refuge from her unstable home life by sneaking into local bars, and hitchhiking to Vancouver. On one occasion in the city, Cebe accompanies a cab driver to his apartment to smoke marijuana. She narrowly escapes when the cabby and his prostitute girlfriend make sexual advances toward her. Cebe flees to a punk concert being put on by Pointed Sticks, a local band. She is treated kindly by the band members, who allow her to watch them perform from the stage; the drummer briefly allows her to play on his drum kit during the performance. Eventually, Cebe is apprehended by police as a runaway minor, and is evaluated by child psychologist Dr. Brean, who returns her to the care of her mother.

Don is released from prison on probation after five years of incarceration, and returns home, where Kathy unsuccessfully attempts to regroup their family. Don continues to engage in reckless behavior and drinking, and shows little remorse for the accident he caused. When the father of one of the children killed in the crash gets Don fired from his job at a local landfill, Don retaliates with the help of Charlie by bludgeoning the man to death outside his home. Later, he shows Cebe a stick of dynamite he stole from the landfill, which he plans on selling for quick money. Don begins physically abusing Kathy, and the stress in the household causes Cebe to lash out at school. She is again evaluated by Dr. Brean, who comes to suspect that Don has sexually abused Cebe since childhood.

Late one night, Don and Charlie get belligerently drunk at the Barnes' house, while Kathy uses heroin in the bathroom. The men joke about Cebe possibly being a lesbian, and Don suggests that Charlie rape her. This drives an incoherent Kathy to tears. Don and Charlie barrel into Cebe's bedroom, where she is dyeing her hair black to resemble that of Elvis. She rebuffs them both, proclaiming her hatred for her father, and forces them and an inconsolable Kathy out of the room. Don later returns to Cebe's bedroom, and recounts memories to her from her childhood. Cebe defiantly tells him she remembers his abuse, before cutting his throat with a pair of scissors, killing him.

Cebe later awakens Kathy, dressed in her father's leather coat, and with a safety pin pierced through her cheek. Cebe insists that Kathy go with her to the wreckage of Don's truck, so they can have a conversation. Kathy agrees to go with her. In the truck, Cebe lights the wick of the dynamite, which she has hidden in the dashboard, and assures her mother it is only an electrical fuse from the wreckage. Moments later, Cebe references Sid Vicious, who "took his loved ones with him" when he died, before the wrecked truck explodes, killing them both.

== Cast ==
- Linda Manz as Cindy "Cebe" Barnes
- Dennis Hopper as Don Barnes
- Sharon Farrell as Kathy Barnes
- Don Gordon as Charlie
- Raymond Burr as Dr. Brean
- Leon Ericksen as Paul (credited as Eric Allen)
- Fiona Brody as Carol
- David L. Crowley as Anderson
- Joan Hoffman as Jean
- Carl Nelson as Cabby
- Francis Ann Pettit as Nancy
- Glen Pfeifer as Glenn
- David Ackridge as Teacher
- Jim Byrnes as Party Singer (credited as Jim Byrne)
- Glen Fyfe as Bouncer
- Pointed Sticks as Band In The Nightclub
- John Anderson as T.V. Interviewer

== Production ==
=== Development ===
This was the first film Hopper directed since 1971's The Last Movie; originally hired as just an actor, Hopper stepped in at the last minute to replace the original director (screenwriter Leonard Yakir).

Hopper redrafted the screenplay—which had originally focused on a psychologist's reforming of a troubled girl—into a darker story with a tragic conclusion.

=== Filming ===
Peter Young was the set decorator for the film. Out of the Blue was made in Vancouver, from October 15, 1979, to December 3, 1979. Various icons of Vancouver in that era are featured in the film, including the Pointed Sticks, one of the leading bands of Vancouver's punk era. Actress Sharon Farrell recalled that Hopper essentially "rewrote the script" for the film every morning, and that he mandated the cast meet each day at 5:00 a.m. to discuss the day's shoot.

== Release ==
Out of the Blue was shown in competition at the Cannes Film Festival in May 1980, a screening which critic Rex Reed wrote was met by "boos, catcalls, and general nausea by shocked audiences who still cannot believe what they have seen." It was later released in Paris on April 15, 1981, Los Angeles on November 17, 1982, New York on April 8, 1983, and in Vancouver, Canada on December 3, 1983.

=== Critical response ===
The film has received praise for Manz's performance in the decades following its release. Roger Ebert wrote in his 3½-star review that "the movie escalates so relentlessly toward its violent, nihilistic conclusion that when it comes, we believe it."

A review in the British publication The Guardian deemed the film an "accomplished dissection of fractured redneck family life," and declared Manz's performance as "stunning." The Boston Globe's Bruce McCabe praised the film's direction and performances, and also discussed its controversial subject matter, which, though difficult to make the film marketable, "shouldn't be held against it."

On the review aggregator website Rotten Tomatoes, the film holds a rating of 95% from 38 reviews. The website's consensus reads, "Led by Linda Manz's outstanding performance, Out of the Blue confronts the darker side of human nature with a baleful, clear-eyed stare." Metacritic, which uses a weighted average, assigned the film a score of 78 out of 100, based on 8 critics, indicating "generally favorable" reviews.

=== Home media ===
Out of the Blue was first released on VHS by Media Home Entertainment in 1984, and again in 1988. Anchor Bay Entertainment released Out of the Blue on DVD on July 27, 1999. In 2022, Severin Films released a UHD and Blu-ray combination set of the film, featuring a brand new restoration, along with numerous new bonus materials and interviews. Severin also issued a standalone Blu-ray disc as well as a DVD edition, the latter of which features a portion of the extras included on the Blu-ray editions.

== Legacy ==
Out of the Blue developed a cult following in the years following its release, and has been cited by film critic Jonathan Rosenbaum as one of the 15 best films of the 1980s. In 2019, actresses Natasha Lyonne and Chloë Sevigny—both fans of the film—helped organize a crowdfund to restore it from its original elements. The restored version was screened at the 2019 Venice Film Festival. It subsequently toured the United States in early 2022, with screenings at the American Cinematheque in Los Angeles, Duke University's Arts Center, Vancouver's Polygon Gallery, and the Hollywood Theatre in Portland, Oregon.

The song "Kill All Hippies" from Scottish rock band Primal Scream's 2000 album XTRMNTR features a sample of Manz' dialogue from the movie.
