= Echo Dek =

Remix album by Primal Scream
- Released: 27 October 1997
- Recorded: Re-recorded and mixed at On-U Sound Studios, London E17
- Genre: Dub; electronica
- Length: 44:23
- Label: Creation
- Producer: Brendan Lynch and Primal Scream (Original production); Adrian Maxwell Sherwood (Mix and Additional Production)

Primal Scream chronology
Vanishing Point (1997)	Echo Dek (1997)	XTRMNTR (2000)

Professional ratings
Review scores
Source	Rating
AllMusic	4/5 stars
NME	6/10 stars
Q	4/5 stars
Uncut	4/5 stars

Echo Dek is a remix album by the Scottish alternative rock band Primal Scream. It was released in October 1997 and followed the group's fifth studio album by less than four months. It peaked at number forty-three on the UK Album Chart and number ninety-seven on the Japanese Oricon Album Chart.

The album is an experimental dub remix of Vanishing Point. The album was extensively reworked with additional production by English record producer Adrian Sherwood. Sherwood sampled Jamaican reggae musician Prince Far I on "Wise Blood". Eight of Vanishing Point's tracks were remixed for the album – two mixes of "Stuka" appear – "Burning Wheel", "If They Move Kill 'Em" and "Motörhead" are the three songs not included.

== Track listing ==
All tracks written by Gillespie, Innes, Young and Duffy; except where indicated.

1. "Living Dub" – 5:30 (Remix of "Long Life")
2. "Duffed Up" – 3:09 (Remix of "Get Duffy")
3. "Revolutionary" – 5:20 (Remix of "Star")
4. "Ju-87" – 5:46 (Remix of "Stuka")
5. "First Name Unknown" (Gillespie, Innes, Young, Duffy and Mounfield) – 5:01 (Remix of "Kowalski")
6. "Vanishing Dub" – 4:51 (Remix of "Out of the Void")
7. "Last Train" – 6:22 (Remix of "Trainspotting")
8. "Wise Blood" – 5:15 (Remix of "Stuka")
9. "Dub in Vain" – 3:10 (Remix of "Medication")

== Personnel ==
- Brendan Lynch (For Lynchmob Productions) and Primal Scream – Original Production on Vanishing Point
- Adrian Maxwell Sherwood – Mix and Additional Production
- Alan Branch – Engineer and Additional Programming
- Darren Grant – Assistant Engineer
- Prince Far I – Vocals ("Wise Blood")
- House – Design (at Intro)
