= John Wilkinson (sound engineer) =

American sound engineer

- Born: April 13, 1920; Hartford, Connecticut, United States
- Died: April 28, 2002 (aged 82); San Diego, California, United States
- Occupation: Sound engineer
- Years active: 1956-1992

John K. "Doc" Wilkinson (April 13, 1920 – April 28, 2002) was an acclaimed American sound engineer. He won an Academy Award for Best Sound and was nominated for another two in the same category. He was also nominated for a BAFTA Award for Best Sound as well as for five Primetime Emmy Awards for Outstanding Sound Mixing.

== Early life ==
Born in Hartford, Connecticut, John K. Wilkinson initially studied at a seminary before pursuing a career in sound engineering. He earned a Ph.D. in design and engineering from Yale University, which honed his technical expertise. Known as "Doc" for his doctorate and scholarly approach to sound, he became a prominent figure in Hollywood's sound mixing industry.

== Career ==
John's work left a significant mark on Hollywood, contributing to more than 140 films across various genres between 1956 and 1992 including The Ten Commandments (1956 film), Breakfast at Tiffany's (film), Hell Is for Heroes (film), Hud (1963 film), Seconds (1966 film), Badlands (film), Mean Streets, Chinatown (1974 film), The Longest Yard (1974 film), Marathon Man (film), Saturday Night Fever, Days of Heaven, Heaven Can Wait (1978 film), The Amityville Horror (1979 film), American Gigolo, Little Darlings, Outland (film), Easy Money (1983 film), Right of Way (film), Friday the 13th: The Final Chapter, Platoon (film), No Way Out (1987 film), Malone (film), Wall Street (1987 film), Halloween 4: The Return of Michael Myers and Lionheart (1990 film). Wilkinson also contributed to television, working on series such as Bonanza, The Rebel (American TV series) and Gunsmoke.

In addition to his sound engineering, Wilkinson made a brief appearance acting as a priest in the 1978 film Days of Heaven, starring Richard Gere. His career spanned over four decades, during which he mentored many future professionals in the industry, including John T. Reitz, who later won an Oscar for The Matrix.

== Legacy ==
Wilkinson retired after a distinguished career, having worked as head sound mixer at Paramount Pictures, Glen Glenn Sound, and Ryder Sound. He died on April 28, 2002, at his home in Oceanside, San Diego, California due to heart failure. His legacy in the film industry remains significant, marked by his contributions to some of the most memorable films and television series in cinematic history.

== Awards and nominations ==
Won

- Platoon (1986) - Academy Award for Best Sound Mixing

Nominated

- Days of Heaven (1978) - Nominated for Academy Award for Best Sound Mixing
- Saturday Night Fever (1979) – Nominated for BAFTA Award for Best Sound
- The Golden Moment: An Olympic Love Story (1980) – Nominated for Outstanding Achievement in Film Sound Mixing
- Outland (1981) - Nominated for Academy Award for Best Sound Mixing
- Amerika (1987) – Nominated for Outstanding Sound Mixing for a Miniseries or a Movie
- The Great Escape II: The Untold Story (1988) – Nominated for Outstanding Sound Mixing for a Miniseries or a Movie
- Double Exposure: The Story of Margaret Bourke-White (1989) – Nominated for Outstanding Sound Mixing for a Miniseries or a Movie
- Caroline? (1990) – Nominated for Outstanding Sound Mixing for a Miniseries or a Movie
