= Vanishing Point (1971 film) =

1971 film directed by Richard C. Sarafian

- Theatrical release poster
- Directed by: Richard C. Sarafian
- Screenplay by: Guillermo Cain
- Story by: Malcolm Hart
- Produced by: Norman Spencer
- Starring: Barry Newman; Cleavon Little; Dean Jagger
- Cinematography: John A. Alonzo
- Edited by: Stefan Arnsten
- Production company: Cupid Productions
- Distributed by: 20th Century Fox
- Release date: March 13, 1971
- Running time: 105 minutes
- Countries: United States; United Kingdom
- Language: English
- Budget: $1.58 million or £500,000
- Box office: $12.4 million

Vanishing Point is a 1971 British-American action film directed by Richard C. Sarafian, starring Barry Newman, Cleavon Little, and Dean Jagger. It focuses on a disaffected ex-policeman and race car driver delivering a muscle car cross-country to California while high on speed ("uppers" in the story), being chased by police, and meeting various characters along the way. Since its release it has developed a cult following.

Although shot in America the bulk of finance came from Britain.

== Plot ==
Car delivery driver Kowalski arrives in Denver, Colorado, late on a Friday night with a black Imperial. The delivery service clerk, Sandy, urges him to get some rest, but Kowalski insists on getting started with his next assignment: delivering a white 1970 Dodge Challenger R/T 440 Magnum (with top speeds exceeding 160 miles per hour [260 km/h]) to San Francisco by Monday. Before leaving Denver, Kowalski pulls into a biker bar parking lot around midnight to buy Benzedrine pills to stay awake for the long drive ahead. He bets his dealer, Jake, that he will get to San Francisco by 3:00 pm Sunday, even though the delivery is not due until Monday. Through flashbacks and the police reading of his record, it's revealed that Kowalski is a Medal of Honor Vietnam War veteran, former race car driver, and motorcycle racer. He is also a former police officer, expelled from the force after preventing the rape of a young woman by his superior. While driving across Colorado over the speed limit, Kowalski is pursued by two motorcycle police. He forces one officer off the road and eludes the other officer by going off-road. Later, the driver of a Jaguar E-Type roadster pulls up alongside Kowalski challenging him to a race. Kowalski is nearly run off the road; he then overtakes the Jaguar which crashes into a river. Kowalski gets out of his car to look back at the driver, then takes off, with police cars in pursuit.

Kowalski drives across Utah into Nevada, with the police in pursuit. During the chase, his radio is tuned to station KOW, broadcasting from Goldfield, Nevada. A blind black disc jockey, who goes by the name of "Super Soul," listens to the police radio frequency and encourages Kowalski to evade the police. With the help of Super Soul, who calls Kowalski "the last American hero", Kowalski gains the interest of the news media, and people gather at the KOW radio station to offer their support. During the police chase across Nevada, Kowalski finds himself surrounded and heads offroad into the desert. After he blows a tire on a dry lake bed and becomes lost, Kowalski is helped by an old prospector who catches rattlesnakes for a Pentecostal Christian commune. The prospector gives Kowalski fuel, and directs him back to the highway. There, he picks up two homosexual hitchhikers stranded en route to San Francisco with a "Just Married" sign in their rear window. The hitchhikers attempt to rob him at gunpoint; Kowalski fights them off and continues alone on his journey.

Saturday afternoon, a vengeful off-duty highway patrolman and a group of thugs break into the KOW studio and assault Super Soul. Near the California state line, Kowalski is helped by hippie biker, Angel, who gives him pills to help him stay awake. Kowalski is recognized by Angel's girlfriend who admires that he prevented the rape by his senior police officer. As Kowalski continues to listen to the KOW broadcast, he notices a change in Super Soul's tone. He suspects he is being directed by the police to entrap him in California. Confirming that the police are indeed waiting at the border, Angel helps Kowalski get through the roadblock by modifying the Challenger to simulate a police car. Kowalski finally reaches California on Saturday at 7:12 pm. He calls Jake from a payphone to reassure him that he still intends to deliver the car on Monday, while acknowledging he won't win their bet, and offering to double it for the next time.

Kowalski picks up a mysterious hitchhiker (Charlotte Rampling) late Saturday night. Kowalski accepts marijuana from her, despite refusing marijuana in several previous scenes. He stops the car when he starts feeling stoned. She says she has been "waiting for him, everywhere and since forever." When he awakens the next morning, she is gone without a trace.

On Sunday morning, California police, who have been tracking Kowalski's movements, set up a roadblock with two bulldozers in the small town of Cisco, which Kowalski will be passing through. A small crowd gathers, some with cameras. Kowalski approaches at high speed; failing to slow down, he smiles as he crashes into the bulldozers, destroying the car in an explosion. As firemen work to put out the flames, the crowd slowly disperses.

== Cast ==
- Barry Newman as Kowalski
- Cleavon Little as "Super Soul"
- Dean Jagger as Prospector
- Victoria Medlin as Vera Thornton
- Karl Swenson as Sandy McKees
- Lee Weaver as Jake
- John Amos as Super Soul's Engineer
- Tom Reese as Sheriff
- Paul Koslo as Charlie
- Robert Donner as Collins
- Owen Bush as Communications Officer
- Bob Palmer as KLZ-TV Reporter (himself)
- Severn Darden as Reverend J. "Jessie" Hovah
- Delaney Bramlett as J. Hovah's Singer
- Bonnie Bramlett as J. Hovah's Singer
- Bekka Bramlett as J. Hovah's Baby
- Rita Coolidge as J. Hovah's Singer
- Claudia Lennear as J. Hovah's Singer, African-American Lady
- Patrice Holloway as J. Hovah's Singer
- David Gates as J. Hovah's Piano Player
- Valerie Kairys Venet as Second Girl
- Anthony James as Male Hitchhiker #1
- Arthur Malet as Male Hitchhiker #2
- Timothy Scott as Angel
- Gilda Texter as Nude Motorcycle Rider
- Charlotte Rampling as Female Hitchhiker (UK version of the film only)

== Production ==
=== Development ===
The film began as an original story by Malcolm Hart. He took it to Norman Spencer, a producer at Cupid Films. Cupid Films was the company of Michael Pearson whose productions included Sympathy for the Devil (1968) and Last of the Long-haired Boys. 20th Century Fox agreed to distribute and the budget was raised from the Bank of America in London.

The screenplay for Vanishing Point was written by G. Cabrera Infante, a Cuban living in England, under the pseudonym Guillermo Cain. The story was based on two actual events: the disgraced career of a San Diego police officer and a high-speed pursuit of a man who refused to stop and was killed when he crashed into a police roadblock. (The film credits the original story to Malcolm Hart.) Infante modeled the character of Super Soul after legendary rock and roll singer The Big Bopper. His script reflected the popular counterculture lifestyle of the time, containing elements of rebellion, drugs, sexual freedom, and rock and roll.

In 1969, director Richard C. Sarafian turned down an offer to make Robert Redford's Downhill Racer in order to direct Vanishing Point. He was drawn to the counterculture themes in Cain's script.

The film had to be shot in the US because of the story. Norman Spencer called it "a sort of runaway production in reverse."

Originally, Sarafin wanted Gene Hackman to play Kowalski, but 20th Century Fox studio executive Richard Zanuck insisted on casting relative unknown actor Barry Newman in the lead role. The film marked the first major screen appearances of Cleavon Little and John Amos.

=== Vehicles ===
According to Sarafian, it was Zanuck who came up with the idea of using the new 1970 Dodge Challenger R/T. He wanted to do Chrysler a favor for their longtime practice of renting cars to 20th Century Fox for $1 a day. Many of the other cars featured in the film are also Chrysler products. Stunt Coordinator Carey Loftin said he requested the Dodge Challenger because of the "quality of the torsion bar suspension and for its horsepower" and felt that it was "a real sturdy, good running car."

Five Alpine White Dodge Challenger R/Ts were lent to the production by Chrysler for promotional consideration and were returned upon completion of filming. Four cars had 440 engines equipped with four-speed manual transmissions; the fifth car was a 383 with a three-speed automatic. No special equipment was added or modifications made to the cars, except for heavier-duty shock absorbers for the car that jumped over No Name Creek. The Challengers were prepared and maintained for the movie by Max Balchowsky, who also prepared the Mustangs and Chargers for Bullitt (1968). The cars performed to Loftin's satisfaction, although dust came to be a problem. None of the engines were supercharged, but sound effects of a supercharger were added in post-production for some scenes. Loftin remembers that parts were taken out of one car to repair another because they "really ruined a couple of those cars" while jumping ramps between highways and over creeks. Newman remembers that the 440 engines in the cars were so powerful that "it was almost as if there was too much power for the body. You'd put it in first and it would almost rear back!" The Challengers appear in the film with Colorado plates OA-5599.

=== Filming ===
Principal photography began in May 1970 with a planned shooting schedule of 60 days. Financial troubles plaguing the studio at the time forced Zanuck to shorten Sarafian's shooting schedule by 22 days. In response, the director decided not to film certain scenes rather than rush through the rest of the shoot.

An average day of filming involved the actors and the crew of 19 men spending many hours traveling to the remote locations, shooting for an extended period of time and then looking for a motel to spend the night. The shoot had a few mishaps, including Newman driving a Challenger equipped with three cameras into the bushes in order to avoid a head-on collision when a "civilian" driver ignored the traffic blocks installed to ensure the safety of the crew.

The film's cinematographer John Alonzo used lightweight Arriflex II cameras, that offered more free movement. Close-up and medium shots were achieved by mounting cameras directly on the vehicles instead of the common practice of filming the drivers from a tow that drove ahead of the targeted vehicle. To convey the appearance of speed, the filmmakers slowed the film rate of the cameras. For example, in the scenes with the Challenger and the Jaguar, the camera's film rate was slowed to half speed. The cars were traveling at approximately 50 miles per hour (80 km/h) so that when projected at normal frame rate, they appeared to be moving much faster.

Vanishing Point was filmed on location in the American Southwest in the states of Colorado, Utah, Nevada, and California.

- Austin, Nevada
- Cisco, Utah (the ending)
- Denver, Colorado
- Esmeralda County, Nevada
- Glenwood Springs, Colorado (first motorcycle police chase)
- Goldfield, Nevada (Super Soul scenes)
- Interstate 70 in Utah
- Lander County, Nevada
- Nye County, Nevada
- Rifle, Colorado
- Thompson Springs, Utah
- Tonopah, Nevada
- Wendover, Utah

Dean Jagger's scenes were shot on the Salt Lakes of Nevada. Super Soul's radio station was filmed in Goldfield, Nevada. All of Cleavon Little's scenes were completed in under three days.

Carey Loftin was the film's stunt coordinator and responsible for setting up and performing the major driving stunts. Loftin's resume at the time included work on Grand Prix (1966), Bullitt (1968), and The French Connection (1971). Barry Newman learned from Loftin and was encouraged by the stunt coordinator to do some of his own stunts. In the scene before Kowalski crashes into the bulldozer, Newman drove and performed a 180-degree turn on the road himself without the director's knowledge.

The 383 car was also used as the tow vehicle in the crash scene at the end of the movie. A quarter-mile cable was attached between the Challenger and an explosives-laden 1967 Chevrolet Camaro with the motor and transmission removed. The tow vehicle was driven by Loftin, who pulled the Camaro into the blades of the bulldozers at high speed. Loftin expected the car to go end over end, but instead it stuck into the bulldozers, which he thought looked better.

=== Ending ===
Barry Newman offered his interpretation of the film's ending in an interview printed in the March 1986 issue of Musclecar Review, "Kowalski smiles as he rushes to his death at the end of Vanishing Point because he believes he will make it through the roadblock." The August 2006 issue of Motor Trend magazine has a sidebar with Newman, in which he explains that Kowalski sees the light glinting from between the two bulldozers. "To Kowalski, it was still a hole to escape through. It symbolized that no matter how far they push or chase you, no one can truly take away your freedom and there is always an escape." Newman also thought that the entire film was an essay on existentialism. Kowalski drives to drive, with no real purpose for doing what he's doing. He decides to give his life its definition and meaning, with complete freedom over his actions.

Sarafian explained that he wanted to make Kowalski appear otherworldly and that the world within the film was a temporary existence that he was just making a stop in. At the end of the film, he was ascending from this existence into another. The lyrics of the end song underscore this interpretation: "Nobody knows, nobody sees, 'til the light of life stops burning, 'til another soul goes free."

== UK theatrical release ==
The UK theatrical release of the film differs slightly from the US release in plot and running time. In the UK release, Kowalski picks up a mysterious hitchhiker (Charlotte Rampling) toward the end of the film. Kowalski accepts marijuana from her, despite refusing marijuana in several previous scenes. He stops the car when he starts feeling stoned. She says she has been "waiting for him, everywhere and since forever." When he awakens the next morning, she is gone without a trace. According to interviews with Barry Newman and commentary from the director, the hitchhiker was meant to be an allegorical figure representing death. This scene was removed from the final US version, reducing the film from 105 minutes to 98 minutes. Newman felt that the scene gave the film "an allegorical lift" but the studio was afraid that the audience would not understand.

== Soundtrack ==
Vanishing Point

Soundtrack album by Various Artists
- Released: March 13, 1971
- Recorded: 1970
- Genres: Country; pop; rock
- Length: 40:51
- Label: Amos
- Producers: Pete Carpenter; Mike Post; Jimmy Bowen; Tom Thacker
Professional ratings
Review scores
| Source | Rating |
|---|---|
| Allmusic | link |

Sarafian wanted to score the majority of the film from an album called Motel Shot by Delaney, Bonnie & Friends. Lionel Newman, head of Fox's music department at the time, denied Sarafian's request because the studio did not want to spend a substantial amount of money obtaining rights to the tracks. The director then suggested that musician Randy Newman score the film, but Fox refused this request as well. After watching the film, musical supervisor Jimmy Bowen wrote three original songs. Delaney, Bonnie & Friends ended up performing a musical number in the film.

A soundtrack of the film was released in the United States by Amos Records. The original vinyl album is long out of print. There have been reissues of the soundtrack compact disc in the United States by various record companies including A&M Records and in Europe by Amos Records.

=== Track listing ===
| No. | Title | Writer(s) | Length |
|---|---|---|---|
| 1. | "Super Soul Theme" (The J.B. Pickers) | Jimmy Bowen | 1:50 |
| 2. | "The Girl Done Got It Together" (Bobby Doyle) | Mike Settle | 2:47 |
| 3. | "Where Do We Go From Here?" (Jimmy Walker) | Mike Settle | 2:53 |
| 4. | "Welcome to Nevada" (Jerry Reed) | Barnhill, Lanier | 1:52 |
| 5. | "Dear Jesus God" (Bob Segarini and Randy Bishop) | Segarini, Bishop | 3:57 |
| 6. | "Runaway Country" (Doug Dillard Expedition) | Doug Dillard, Byron Berline | 4:09 |
| 7. | "You Got to Believe" (Delaney, Bonnie & Friends) | Delaney Bramlett | 3:00 |
| 8. | "Love Theme" (Jimmy Bowen Orchestra) | Jimmy Bowen | 2:40 |
| 9. | "So Tired" (Eve) | Creamer, Sliwin, Temmer | 2:10 |
| 10. | "Freedom of Expression" (The J.B. Pickers) | Jimmy Bowen | 5:48 |
| 11. | "Mississippi Queen" (Mountain) | West, Laing, Pappalardi, Rea | 2:32 |
| 12. | "Sing Out for Jesus" (Big Mama Thornton) | Kim Carnes | 1:47 |
| 13. | "Over Me" (Bob Segarini and Randy Bishop) | Bob Segarini, Randy Bishop | 3:04 |
| 14. | "Nobody Knows" (Kim & Dave) | Mike Settle | 2:22 |
| Total length: | | | 40:51 |

"Nobody Knows" is the first-ever recording by Kim Carnes, credited on the soundtrack as "Kim & Dave" (with husband Dave Ellingson). Carnes also wrote the song performed by Big Mama Thornton. The pop music group Delaney, Bonnie & Friends had a small role as a Christian music band, which included singer Rita Coolidge and singer-songwriter David Gates at the piano. The baby held by one of the singers is Bekka Bramlett, who later replaced Stevie Nicks in Fleetwood Mac.

== Reception ==
=== Critical ===
Vanishing Point premiered in January 1971 and did not receive positive notices. In his review for the Los Angeles Times, Charles Champlin wrote, "Vanishing Point might have had a point, but it ... ah ... got lost. What's left is sophisticated craft and fashionably hokey cynicism".

Variety magazine said, "While stock car addicts may be able to maintain interest in the ultra-fast manipulation of the car, many viewers will just get car-sick ... or sick of the car, which isn't the same thing".

Larry Cohen, in the Reporter criticized the film for being "calculated, tedious and in desperate need of tightening, the picture, produced by Norman Spencer, is uninvolving and devoid of a cohesiveness that might have made it work".

On the other hand, music journalist and essayist Robert Christgau included Vanishing Point on his list of the year's best films at number four. While conceding the characterization to be "tacky", he said the "whole virtue" of this "mostly ignored B-movie" is "visual rather than romantic", while recommending viewers see the movie under the influence of cannabis.

=== Box office ===
Newman recalls that Fox had no faith in the film and released it in neighborhood theaters only to disappear in less than two weeks. However, it was a critical and commercial success in the UK and Europe which prompted the studio to re-release it in the United States on a double bill with The French Connection. After completing its run at the cinema box office, the film gained extended life as it became a second feature favorite in drive-in theaters across the US, often as a double-feature paired with another car chase film, Dirty Mary, Crazy Larry. A cult following began to develop, due in large part to a broadcast on network television in 1976.

The film earned rentals of $4,250,000 in North America.

== Legacy ==
=== Film ===
The movie, which is considered a cult classic, is one of Steven Spielberg's favorite films. Edgar Wright named Vanishing Point one of his 1,000 favorite films, and used it as inspiration for his 2017 film Baby Driver.

Death Proof (2007), the Quentin Tarantino-directed contribution to the faux-exploitation "double feature" Grindhouse (2007), features a chase involving a Dodge Challenger resembling the one seen in Vanishing Point (not being an R/T model and having an automatic transmission). Death Proof also references the film by name, repeatedly calling it "one of the best American movies ever made". The car in the film also has the license plate OA 5599.

The film has a rating of 63% on Rotten Tomatoes, based on 76 reviews with the consensus: "Vanishing Point hurtles forward as a hypnotic chase film whose existential script, striking visuals, and raw velocity keep it gripping even as its indulgences and narrative gaps veer it toward the uneven." In 2014, Time Out polled several film critics, directors, actors and stunt actors to list their top action films. Vanishing Point was listed at 70th place on this list. In 2025, The Hollywood Reporter listed Vanishing Point as having the best stunts of 1971.

=== Music ===
Vanishing Point was the inspiration for Primal Scream's 1997 album of the same name. Lead singer Bobby Gillespie said, "The music in the film is hippy music, so we thought, 'Why not record some music that really reflects the mood of the film?' It's always been a favourite of the band, we love the air of paranoia and speed-freak righteousness ... It's a pure underground film, rammed with claustrophobia". A track from the album was named "Kowalski", after the character from the film. Author Irvine Welsh scripted the video for "Kowalski" which was directed by musician Douglas Hart. The video features a Dodge Challenger and super model Kate Moss beating up the band. The track also featured samples of Super Soul's "last American hero" speech from the film.

Super Soul's "last American hero" speech was also incorporated into the lyrics of the Guns N' Roses song "Breakdown", from their album Use Your Illusion II (1991).

The film was the basis for Audioslave's music video "Show Me How to Live" (2003), directed by the AV Club and which included members of the band in the 1970 Challenger traveling across the desert, following the plot of the movie. Cleavon Little also appears in the video.

There is an unreleased song "I Can't Believe It" (from the 11:39) of country band Longbranch Pennywhistle missing from the tracklist.

The main theme "Freedom of Expression" is still used, since the original version to some contemporary variations, as the overture track for the brazilian documentaries TV program Globo Repórter.

New Order have a track on their Technique album called Vanishing Point.

=== Television ===
In the November 10, 2021, episode of Late Show with Stephen Colbert, Bruce Springsteen named Vanishing Point as his favorite action film.

=== Video game and other references ===
The video game Grid 2 (2013) features a trophy/achievement called Vanishing Point, with the description reading "You've won a race in a white Dodge Challenger but lived to tell the tale, unlike Kowalski."

The video game Driver: San Francisco includes a Movie Challenge entitled “Vanishing Chance” which involves piloting a white 1970 Dodge Challenger.

Jet Set Radio invokes similar themes of police evasion and rebellion as the movie. Of particular note is DJ Professor K, the game’s primary narrator and “captain” of the titular pirate radio station who is inspired by Super Soul. They are both passionate black pirate radio station managers who narrate the antics of their respective stories’ protagonists, whom they vocally support.

== Remake ==
A remake of the film was created for Fox television, first airing in 1997, and also featuring a 1970 Dodge Challenger. The engine in the remake is carefully shown to be the 426 Hemi. This was a $825 option over the base R/T engine, the 383 4 barrel. The 426 was/is a legendary engine with few made. It had two 4 barrel carburators. The film stars Viggo Mortensen as Jimmy Kowalski (in this version, the character has a first name). Kowalski is rewritten as a suspected militia sympathizer from Idaho, and Jason Priestley as "The Voice", a white libertarian talk radio shock jock who replaces Super Soul. The sequence of events in the two films is vaguely similar, but the remake removed all of the original's mystical, existential elements, replacing them with a religious motivation for Kowalski's actions. Among many other changes, it also added a sequence in which two cops attempt to chase down the Challenger in a black 1968 Dodge Charger.

== Home media ==
There were two theatrical releases, a U.S. version and a UK version. Both are included on the Region 1 DVD and Blu-ray

Fox released Vanishing Point in the United States on Blu-ray on February 24, 2009.

It was also released on Blu-ray in Germany in 2013 under the title Fluchtpunkt San Francisco and has a running time of 99 minutes with English soundtrack.

Fabulous Film's released a 2-Disc Blu-ray in June 2019 in the UK featuring both US and UK versions of the film and a load of special features.

A 4K restoration of the film was screened by the Library of Congress at the Packard Campus in Culpeper, Virginia on May 24, 2024. This restoration has not been released on home media as of May 2024.

The movie received also a release in the GDR as "Grenzpunkt 0" in 1975.
