= XTRMNTR =

Studio album by Primal Scream
- Released: 31 January 2000
- Genres: Electro-rock; shoegaze; noise rock; alternative dance; electro-industrial; experimental
- Length: 60:24
- Labels: Creation; Astralwerks
- Producers: Brendan Lynch; Primal Scream; Jagz Kooner; David Holmes; Hugo Nicolson; The Chemical Brothers; Kevin Shields; Tim Holmes; Dan the Automator

Primal Scream chronology
Echo Dek (1997)	XTRMNTR (2000)	Evil Heat (2002)

Singles from XTRMNTR
- 1. "Swastika Eyes" Released: 15 November 1999; 2. "Kill All Hippies" Released: 20 March 2000; 3. "Accelerator" Released: 11 September 2000

XTRMNTR (a disemvoweling of "Exterminator") is the sixth studio album by Scottish rock band Primal Scream. It was first released on 31 January 2000 in the United Kingdom by Creation Records and on 2 May 2000 in the United States by Astralwerks. It peaked at number 3 on the UK Albums Chart.

In a departure from their earlier, more hedonistic recordings, the band took a more political stance on the album, attacking government, police, and multinational corporations. Its sound is more aggressive and forceful than Primal Scream's previous output, with noisy, harsh, electronic sounds reminiscent of industrial music forming the basis for many of its songs. Although Gary Mounfield (a.k.a. Mani) joined the band in 1997 and recorded a selection of tracks on their previous album Vanishing Point (1997), it marked the first time he shared songwriting credits with them, as well as his first full album since his time with The Stone Roses.

Kevin Shields of My Bloody Valentine was seen as a "semi-permanent member" of the band around the release of the album by performing live, helping producing the album and playing on songs. The album also features contributions from The Chemical Brothers and Bernard Sumner of New Order.

The album is notable for being the final full-length release on Creation Records, with the track "Accelerator" later lifted to become the final single released on the label.

== Critical reception ==
Professional ratings
Aggregate scores
Source	Rating
Metacritic	90/100
Review scores
Source	Rating
AllMusic	4.5/5 stars
Alternative Press	4/5
Entertainment Weekly	B+
The Guardian	4/5 stars
The List	5/5 stars
NME	9/10
Pitchfork	8.1/10
Q	4/5 stars
Rolling Stone	4/5 stars
The Rolling Stone Album Guide	4/5 stars

At Metacritic, which assigns a weighted average score out of 100 to reviews from mainstream critics, the album received an average score of 90, based on 16 reviews, indicating "universal acclaim".

NME magazine rated XTRMNTR #2 in its "Top 50 Albums of the Year 2000", and later at the NME Carling Awards 2001, it won "Best Album" of the year. Uncut, like NME, named it at #2 on their list of the best albums of 2000.

Over the years, it has gathered more praise, including appearances on lists of the top albums of the 2000s: NME placed it at #3 of their top 50 albums of decade list and Pitchfork placed it at #142 in its Top 200 Albums of the 2000s list. Metacritic placed it at #20 of the 40 best reviewed albums released 2000–9. In 2001, Q magazine named it as one of the "50 Heaviest Albums of All Time". Praising the production, Stylus Magazine included the album on their 2006 list of the "Top Ten Best Sounding Records, 1997–Present", and later ranked the album at number 10 on their "Stylus Decade" list of the "Top 100 Albums of the 2000s".

In October 2011, NME placed "Swastika Eyes" at #45 and "Accelerator" at #114 on its list "150 Best Tracks of the Past 15 Years". In 2014, they ranked "Shoot Speed/Kill Light" at #190 and "Kill All Hippies" at #497 in their list of the "500 Greatest Songs of All Time".

Referring to the 2013 update, the album ranks at number 160 in NME's The 500 Greatest Albums of All Time.

In 2019, the album was ranked 65th on The Guardian's 100 Best Albums of the 21st Century list.

== Track listing ==
All tracks are written by Primal Scream, except "Kill All Hippies", written with M. Nelson and Discovery Productions Inc.

No.	Title	Length
1.	"Kill All Hippies"	4:57
2.	"Accelerator"	3:41
3.	"Exterminator"	5:49
4.	"Swastika Eyes" (Jagz Kooner mix)	7:05
5.	"Pills"	4:17
6.	"Blood Money"	7:03
7.	"Keep Your Dreams"	5:24
8.	"Insect Royalty"	3:35
9.	"MBV Arkestra (If They Move Kill 'Em)"	6:41
10.	"Swastika Eyes" (Chemical Brothers mix)	6:33
11.	"Shoot Speed/Kill Light"	5:19

2009 Japanese reissue (Expanded Edition): disc 1 additional track listing
No.	Title	Length
12.	"5 Years Ahead of My Time" (The Third Bardo cover)	4:08
13.	"Swastika Eyes" (Spectre mix)	8:10
14.	"Swastika Eyes" (David Holmes mix)	6:01

2009 Japanese reissue edition: Disc 2
No.	Title	Length
1.	"Kill All Hippies" (Two Lone Swordsmen #2)	5:49
2.	"Exterminator" (Massive Attack remix)	5:10
3.	"Exterminator" (Jagz Kooner remix)	5:38
4.	"When The Kingdom Comes"	4:22
5.	"Hammond Connection"	3:40

Note

- Digital versions follow the reissue track listing, cutting off at "5 Years Ahead of My Time". Spotify only includes the Expanded Edition.

== Personnel ==
Credits adapted from liner notes.

Primal Scream

- Bobby Gillespie – vocals, guitar, samples
- Andrew Innes – guitar
- Robert Young – guitar, programming
- Martin Duffy – keyboards, programming
- Gary 'Mani' Mounfield – bass
- Darrin Mooney – drums
- Jim Hunt – saxophone
- Duncan Mackay – trumpet

Additional musicians

- Marco Nelson
- Kevin Shields
- Bernard Sumner
- Phil Mossman
- Darren Morris
- Zac Danziger
- Brendan Lynch
- Greg Knowles
- Gay-Yee Westerhoff
- Keith Tenniswood

Production

- Primal Scream – production (1, 2, 3), recording
- Brendan Lynch – production (1, 2, 3, 11), co-production (1, 3), recording (2, 3, 11)
- Kevin Shields – production (11), mixing (2, 9)
- Adrian Maxwell Sherwood – recording (6, 7)
- Jagz Kooner – production (4), mixing (4), programming (7)
- David Holmes – production (6, 7), co-production (6)
- Hugo Nicolson – production (8), co-production (8), mixing (8)
- The Chemical Brothers – production (10), mixing (10)
- Tim Holmes – production (11)
- Dan the Automator – production (5), mixing (5)
- Andy Wilkinson – engineering (2, 9)
- Jon Weiner – engineering (6)
- Alan Branch – recording (6, 7)

== Charts ==
Chart	Peak position
Australian Albums (ARIA)	17
Finnish Albums (Suomen virallinen lista)	27
Irish Albums (IRMA)	14
German Albums (Offizielle Top 100)	95
New Zealand Albums (RMNZ)	17
Norwegian Albums (VG-lista)	15
Scottish Albums (Official Charts)	1
Swedish Albums (Sverigetopplistan)	7
UK Albums (Official Charts)	3
UK Independent Albums (Official Charts)	1
US Independent Albums (Billboard)	31

== Certifications ==
Region	Certification	Certified units/sales
Japan (RIAJ)	Gold	100,000^{^}
^{^} Shipments figures based on certification alone.
