= Star (Primal Scream song) =

1997 single by Primal Scream

Single by Primal Scream

from the album Vanishing Point
- B-side: "Jesus"
- Released: 16 June 1997
- Length: 4:28
- Label: Creation
- Songwriter(s): Martin Duffy; Bobby Gillespie; Andrew Innes; Robert Young
- Producer(s): Brendan Lynch; Primal Scream

Primal Scream singles chronology
"Kowalski" (1997)	"Star" (1997)	"Burning Wheel" (1997)

Professional ratings
Review scores
Source	Rating
AllMusic	3/5 stars

"Star" is a song by Scottish rock band Primal Scream. It was released on 16 June 1997 as the second single from their fifth studio album, Vanishing Point (1997). It peaked at number 16 on the UK Singles Chart. NME named it the 27th best track of 1997.

== Track listing ==
All tracks were written and composed by Gillespie, Innes, Young, and Duffy.

7-inch vinyl single
No.	Title	Length
1.	"Star"	4:28
2.	"Jesus"	4:29

12-inch vinyl and CD single
No.	Title	Length
1.	"Star"	4:28
2.	"Jesus"	4:29
3.	"Rebel Dub"	5:20
4.	"How Does It Feel to Belong"	5:36

== Personnel ==
Credits are adapted from the liner notes.

- Bobby Gillespie – vocals; drums and tambourine on "How Does It Feel to Belong"
- Robert Young – lead guitar
- Andrew Innes – rhythm guitar; "Bhangra Box" on "How Does It Feel to Belong"
- Martin Duffy – keyboards
- Marco Nelson – bass guitar
- Augustus Pablo – melodica
- Andrew Love – saxophone
- Wayne Jackson – trumpet
- Pandit Dinesh – tabla

== Charts ==
Chart (1997)	Peak position
Europe (Eurochart Hot 100)	100
Sweden (Sverigetopplistan)	25
UK Singles (OCC)	16
