= Dorothy (TV series) =

- Genre: Sitcom
- Directed by: John Rich
- Starring: Dorothy Loudon; Linda Manz; Elissa Leeds; Russell Nype; Michele Greene
- Theme music composer: Billy Goldenberg; Bill Dyer
- Opening theme: "Dorothy" performed by Dorothy Loudon
- Country of origin: United States
- Original language: English
- No. of seasons: 1
- No. of episodes: 4

Production
- Running time: 30 minutes
- Production companies: The Konigsberg Company; Davis-Carroll Productions; Warner Bros. Television

Original release
- Network: CBS
- Release: August 8 – August 29, 1979

Dorothy is an American television sitcom that aired on CBS on Wednesday nights from August 8, 1979 to August 29, 1979.

== Plot ==
Dorothy Banks is a divorced former showgirl who becomes a music and drama teacher at the exclusive Hannah Hunt School for Girls. The series bore some similarities to The Facts of Life, a much-longer-running sitcom that also premiered in August 1979 and also involved a central female character who worked at an all-girls school.

== Cast ==
- Dorothy Loudon as Dorothy Banks
- Kip Gilman as T. Jack Landis
- Elissa Leeds as Cissy
- Linda Manz as Frankie
- Susan Brecht as Meredith
- Michele Greene as Margo
- Priscilla Morrill as Lorna Cathcart
- Russell Nype as Burton Foley

== Episodes ==
No.	Title	Directed by	Written by	Original release date
1	"The Bookworm Turns"	John Rich	Rick Hawkins & Liz Sage	August 8, 1979
Dorothy uses stories and humor to help one of her young students recover from her crush on the biology teacher.
2	"Hard Hearted Hamlet"	John Rich	Bob Carroll, Jr. & Madelyn Davis	August 15, 1979
Dorothy makes a last-ditch effort to drum "Hamlet" into the head of a dead-end kid before she flunks out.
3	"Lies and Whispers"	John Rich	Rick Hawkins & Liz Sage	August 22, 1979
After Dorothy and her friends hear a rumor that the headmaster is being fired, each begins to secretly vie for the job.
4	"Give My Regrets to Broadway"	John Rich	Linda Morris & Vic Rauseo	August 29, 1979
Everyone in school blames Dorothy and Frankie when their field trips are banned after Frankie is arrested for panhandling during a museum visit.

== Bibliography ==
- Tim Brooks and Earle Marsh, The Complete Directory to Prime Time Network and Cable TV Shows 1946–Present, Ninth edition (New York: Ballantine Books, 2007) ISBN 978-0-345-49773-4
