= Days of Heaven =

1978 American romantic period drama film by Terrence Malick

- Theatrical release poster
- Directed by: Terrence Malick
- Written by: Terrence Malick
- Produced by: Bert Schneider; Harold Schneider
- Starring: Richard Gere; Brooke Adams; Sam Shepard; Linda Manz
- Cinematography: Néstor Almendros; Haskell Wexler
- Edited by: Billy Weber
- Music by: Ennio Morricone; Leo Kottke; Camille Saint-Saëns
- Production company: Paramount Pictures
- Distributed by: Paramount Pictures
- Release date: September 13, 1978
- Running time: 94 minutes
- Country: United States
- Language: English
- Budget: $3 million
- Box office: $3.7 million

Days of Heaven is a 1978 American period drama film written and directed by Terrence Malick, and starring Richard Gere, Brooke Adams, Sam Shepard and Linda Manz. Set in 1916, it tells the story of Bill and Abby, lovers who travel to the Texas Panhandle for work harvesting crops for a wealthy grain farmer. Bill persuades Abby to claim the fortune of the dying farmer by tricking him into a sham marriage.

Days of Heaven was Malick's second feature film, after Badlands (1973), and was produced on a budget of $3 million. Production was particularly troublesome, with a tight shooting schedule in Canada in 1976 and significant budget constraints. Film editing took Malick a lengthy two years, due to difficulty with achieving a general flow and assembly of the scenes. This was eventually solved by incorporating improvised narration from teen Linda Manz. The film was scored by Ennio Morricone with contributions by guitarist Leo Kottke, and photographed by Néstor Almendros and Haskell Wexler.

Days of Heaven received positive reviews upon its original theatrical release. Its natural-light photography was widely praised. The film was not a significant commercial success, but won the Academy Award for Best Cinematography and received three additional nominations for score, costume design and sound. Malick won the Cannes Film Festival Award for Best Director and was nominated for the Golden Globe.

Days of Heaven has since become one of the most acclaimed films of the decade, particularly for its cinematography. It appeared at #49 on a BBC 2015 poll of the greatest American films. In 2007, the film was selected for preservation in the United States National Film Registry by the Library of Congress as being "culturally, historically, or aesthetically significant".

== Plot ==
In 1916, (Note: The film shows a 1916 newspaper, and a scene late in the film shows American soldiers headed off for World War I.) Chicago steelworker Bill accidentally kills his factory foreman during an argument. He flees to the Texas Panhandle with his girlfriend Abby and his young sister Linda. As their train winds its way across the country, an older Linda mulls over these events in voiceover narration. She recalls that a religious man once warned her of a vision of apocalyptic hellfire, and notes that at the Last Judgment, God will rescue the good and turn away the evil.

In Texas, a wealthy farmer suffering from an unspecified malady hires as many seasonal shockers as he can find, including Bill and Abby, who pretend to be siblings to deter gossip. Bill overhears a doctor telling the farmer that he has one year left to live. The farmer's accountant encourages him to sell his farm and enjoy his profits, but the farmer decides on staying.

The terminally ill farmer takes a liking to Abby, and asks her to stay with him after the harvest. Bill encourages Abby to marry the farmer so that they can inherit his money when he dies. Abby questions whether Bill still loves her. Bill confidently predicts that the farmer will die soon and they will be reunited. Abby marries the farmer and persuades him to let Bill and Linda stay at the farmhouse. The farmer's foreman suspects that Abby and Bill are con artists, but the farmer dismisses the suggestion and distances himself from the foreman.

The farmer's health remains stable, foiling Bill's plans. Over time, the shy farmer wins over Abby with his genuine disposition. However, he grows suspicious of Abby's excessively familiar relationship with her "brother." Bill belatedly realizes that Abby has fallen in love with the farmer. He realizes that the only way to salvage the situation is to depart the farm, leaving his little sister with his ex-girlfriend. The farmer tries to be a good father figure to Linda.

Bill returns to the farm during the following year's harvest. He admits to Abby that encouraging her to marry another man was a mistake. Before Abby can make a decision, a locust swarm arrives. To save the harvest, the farmer lights controlled fires to smoke out the locusts. However, when he sees Bill, he loses control of himself and chases after Bill with a gun. He accidentally knocks over one of his own lamps, triggering a blaze that destroys much of the harvest. Bill kills the farmer with a screwdriver the next day during a confrontation where the farmer points a revolver at him.

Once again, Bill, Abby, and Linda are on the run. With the foreman's help, the police shoot Bill while he tries to escape. Seeking a new life, Abby leaves Linda at a boarding school and departs on a train with soldiers headed for World War I. Later, Linda runs away from the school with a friend from the farm.

== Cast ==
- Richard Gere as Bill
- Brooke Adams as Abby
- Sam Shepard as The Farmer
- Linda Manz as Linda
- Robert Wilke as The Farm Foreman

In addition, Jackie Shultis plays Linda's Friend, who later helps her escape the boarding school. Future Louisiana Music Hall of Fame inductee Doug Kershaw appears as The Fiddler. Stuart Margolin as The Mill Foreman and Richard Libertini as The Vaudeville Leader are also in the film.

== Production ==
=== Development ===
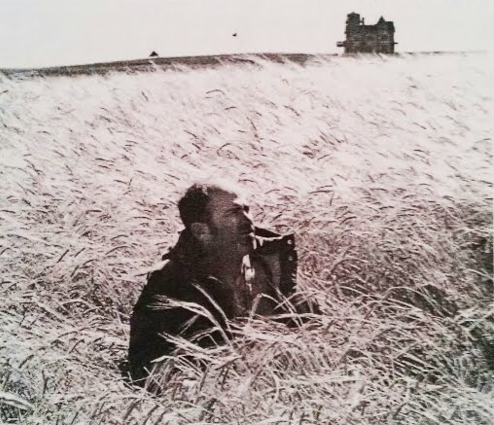
Terrence Malick during the filming of Days of Heaven.

In 1975, Jacob Brackman introduced Malick to fellow producer Bert Schneider. On a trip to Cuba, Schneider and Malick began conversations that would lead to the development of Days of Heaven. Schneider agreed to produce the film. Paramount Pictures CEO Barry Diller, who wanted Schneider to produce films for him, agreed to finance Days of Heaven. At the time, the studio was heading in a new direction. They were hiring new production heads who had worked in network television and, according to former production chief Richard Sylbert, "[manufacturing] product aimed at your knees". Despite the change in direction, Schneider was able to secure a deal with Paramount by guaranteeing the budget and taking personal responsibility for all overages. "Those were the kind of deals I liked to make ... because then I could have final cut and not talk to nobody about why we're gonna use this person instead of that person", Schneider said.

Malick admired cinematographer Néstor Almendros's work on The Wild Child (1970) and wanted him to shoot Days of Heaven. Almendros was impressed by Malick's knowledge of photography and willingness to use little studio lighting. The two men modeled the film's cinematography after silent films, which often used natural light. They drew inspiration from painters such as Johannes Vermeer, Edward Hopper (particularly his House by the Railroad), and Andrew Wyeth, as well as photo-reporters from the start of the 20th century.

=== Casting ===
Before 1975, Malick had tried and failed to get Dustin Hoffman or Al Pacino to star in the film, and John Travolta auditioned for and won the lead role of Bill, but ABC-TV refused to release him from his contract for the television series Welcome Back, Kotter.

Actor	Role
Richard Gere	Bill
Brooke Adams	Abby
Sam Shepard	The Farmer
Linda Manz	Linda
Robert Wilke	Farm Foreman
Jackie Shultis	Linda's Friend
Stuart Margolin	Mill Foreman
Tim Scott	Harvest Hand
Gene Bell	Dancer
Richard Libertini	Vaudeville Leader
Doug Kershaw	Fiddler

Schneider and Malick cast young actors Richard Gere and Brooke Adams and actor/playwright Sam Shepard for the lead roles. All three were relative unknowns: Gere had appeared in a handful of minor roles (although he had more substantial parts in Looking for Mr. Goodbar and Bloodbrothers, which were filmed after Days of Heaven but released prior), Brooke Adams' only prior credited film work was a lead in the horror B-movie Shock Waves (released during Days of Heaven's post-production). The casting director didn't intend to recommend Adams to Malick, but Malick viewed her audition tape independently, and decided to call her back. While Shepard was a prominent playwright, his only prior film role was a cameo in the 1970 experimental film Brand X.

15-year-old child actress Linda Manz was likewise a first-timer, a "streetwise kid" who attended a performing arts school in New York. Manz turned up unannounced at casting director Barbara L. Claman's office, "smoking and looking all of 10 years old" but, according to Claman, "she had that special quality we wanted." Manz's part was initially smaller, but Malick was so impressed by her that he made a last-minute decision to have her improvise an unscripted narration (see: Post-production).

=== Principal photography ===
Production began in the late summer of 1976. Although the film was set in Texas, the Rocky Mountains are incongruously seen in the exteriors shot in southwestern Alberta in and around the ghost town of Whiskey Gap, located 4 kilometres (2.5 mi) from the Montana border, while the denouement was shot on the grounds of Heritage Park Historical Village in Calgary.

Jack Fisk designed and built the mansion from plywood in the wheat fields and the smaller houses where the workers lived. The mansion was not a facade, as was usually the custom, but authentically recreated inside and out with period colors: brown, mahogany, and dark wood for the interiors. Patricia Norris designed and made the period costumes from used fabrics and old clothes to avoid the artificial look of studio-made costumes.

To film the swarm of locusts rising into the sky, the film-makers dropped peanut shells from helicopters while the actors walked backwards. This was then run in reverse so that the ground action moved forward, and the locusts were seen ascending.

According to Almendros, the production was not "rigidly prepared", allowing for improvisation. Daily call sheets could have been more detailed, and the schedule changed to suit the weather. This upset some Hollywood crew members not used to working this way. Most crew members were used to a "glossy style of photography" and felt frustrated because Almendros did not give them much work. Daily, he asked them to turn off the lights they had prepared for him. Some crew members said that Almendros and Malick did not know what they were doing. The tension led to some of the crew quitting the production. Malick supported what Almendros was doing and pushed the film's look further, removing more lighting aids and leaving the image bare.

Due to union regulations, Almendros was not allowed to operate the camera. With Malick, he would plan out and rehearse the camera's and the actors' movements. Almendros would stand near the main camera and give instructions to the camera operators. Almendros was gradually losing sight by the time shooting began. To evaluate his set-ups, "he had one of his assistants take Polaroids of the scene, then examined them through powerful glasses". According to Almendros, Malick wanted "a very visual movie. The story would be told through visuals. Very few people really want to give that priority to image. Usually the director gives priority to the actors and the story, but here the story was told through images".

Much of the film was shot during magic hour, which Almendros called "a euphemism, because it's not an hour but around 25 minutes at the most. It is the moment when the sun sets, and after the sun sets and before it is night. The sky has light, but there is no actual sun. The light is very soft, and there is something magic about it. It limited us to around twenty minutes a day, but it did pay on the screen. It gave some kind of magic look, a beauty and romanticism." Lighting was integral to filming, and helped evoke the painterly quality of the landscapes in the film. A vast majority of the scenes were filmed late in the afternoon or after sunset, with the sky silhouetting the actor's faces, which would otherwise be difficult to see. Interior scenes that feature light coming in from the outside were shot using artificial light to maintain the consistency of that intruding light. However, the "magic look" also extended to interior scenes, which occasionally used natural light.

For the "locusts" sequence, the filmmakers dropped peanut shells from helicopters to simulate a swarm of insects. To cause the swarm to seem to rise from a field, the director told actors to walk backward as the shells fell to the ground. The finished footage was run in reverse, creating an image of people walking forward as a locust swarm rose from the field. For close-ups and insert shots, thousands of live locusts were used which had been captured and supplied by Canada's Department of Agriculture.

While the photography yielded the director satisfactory results, the rest of the production was difficult. The actors and crew reportedly viewed Malick as cold and distant. After two weeks of shooting, Malick was so disappointed with the dailies, he "decided to toss the script, go Leo Tolstoy instead of Fyodor Dostoyevsky, wide instead of deep [and] shoot miles of film with the hope of solving the problems in the editing room."

The harvesting machines constantly broke down, which resulted in shooting beginning late in the afternoon, allowing for only a few hours of light before it was too dark to go on. One day, two helicopters were scheduled to drop peanut shells to simulate locusts on film; however, Malick decided to shoot period cars instead. He kept the helicopters on hold at great cost. Production needed to catch up, with costs exceeding the $3,000,000 budget by about $800,000, and Schneider had already mortgaged his home to cover the overages.

The production ran so late that both Almendros and camera operator John Bailey had to leave due to a prior commitment on François Truffaut's The Man Who Loved Women (1977). Almendros approached cinematographer Haskell Wexler to complete the film. They worked together for a week so that Wexler could get familiar with the film's visual style.

Wexler was careful to match Almendros' work, but he did make some exceptions. "I did some hand held shots on a Panaflex", he said, "[for] the opening of the film in the steel mill. I used some diffusion. Nestor didn't use any diffusion. I felt very guilty using the diffusion and having the feeling of violating a fellow cameraman." Although half the finished picture was footage shot by Wexler, he received only credit for "additional photography", much to his chagrin. The credit denied him any chance of an Academy Award for his work on Days of Heaven. Wexler sent film critic Roger Ebert a letter "in which he described sitting in a theater with a stop-watch to prove that more than half of the footage" was his. Later in life, however, he had accepted Almendros receiving credit as cinematographer:

I thought, "Well, God damn it. I should get credit with Nestor on it." And then I had talks with the producer, Bert Schneider, and he said, "Look, you've won Oscars already. What the hell, Nestor should have it." So then I said to myself, "Well, Haskell, you're being a little selfish." And the real thing that convinced me not to say anything ... was that Nestor set the tone of the film. It was actually me maintaining his style to a certain extent, so if there was to be an award, which we didn't know there would be, he should get it. And I'm so happy now—particularly since he is no longer with us—that that happened.

=== Post-production ===
Most of Days of Heaven was filmed during dawn and dusk, a time known as the "golden hour". Critics were unanimous in citing the photography as a technical highlight.

Following the completion of principal photography, the editing process took over two years to complete. Malick had a difficult time shaping the film and getting the pieces to go together. Schneider reportedly showed some footage to director Richard Brooks, who was considering Gere for a role in Looking for Mr. Goodbar. According to Schneider, the editing for Days of Heaven took so long that "Brooks cast Gere, shot, edited and released Looking for Mr. Goodbar while Malick was still editing".

A breakthrough came when Malick experimented with voice-overs from Linda Manz's character, similar to what he had done with Sissy Spacek in Badlands. According to editor Billy Weber, Malick scrapped much of the film's dialogue, replacing it with Manz's voice-over, which served as an oblique commentary on the story. Manz told interviewers, years later, that, "I just watched the movie and rambled on," and "They took whatever dialogue they liked." After a year, Malick had to call the actors to Los Angeles, California to shoot inserts of shots that were necessary but had not been filmed in Alberta. The finished film thus includes close-ups of Shepard that were shot under a freeway overpass. The underwater shot of Gere's falling face down into the river was shot in a large aquarium in Spacek's living room.

Meanwhile, Schneider was disappointed with Malick. He had confronted Malick numerous times about missed deadlines and broken promises. Due to further cost overruns, he had to ask Paramount for more money, which he preferred not to do. When they screened a demo for Paramount and made their pitch, the studio was impressed and reportedly "gave Malick a very sweet deal at the studio, carte blanche, essentially". Malick was not able to capitalize on the deal. He was so exhausted from working on the film that he moved to Paris with his girlfriend. He tried developing another project for Paramount, but after a substantial amount of work, he abandoned it. He did not make another film until 20 years later, 1998's The Thin Red Line.

== Soundtrack ==
The soundtrack for Days of Heaven is a strong reflection of the film's context. Ennio Morricone provided the film's score and received his first Academy Award nomination in his soundtrack composing career for his work on the film. Morricone recalled the process as being "demanding" and said of Malick: "He didn't know me very well, so he made suggestions, and in some cases, gave musical solutions. This kind of annoyed me because he'd say: 'This thing ... try it with three flutes.' Something impossible! So, to humor him, I would do it with three flutes and then he'd decide to use my version after all. His was impossible or I would have written it myself. And more nitpicking like that which means he was very attentive and careful about music."

Morricone's score includes four recurring pieces: "Harvest", "Happiness", "The Honeymoon", and "The Return". "Harvest" is the film's main theme and opens with a melody that references "Aquarium", the seventh movement from Camille Saint-Saëns's Carnival of the Animals; the original of that piece was used as the musical background for the film's opening credits. The soundtrack was remastered and re-released in July 2011 on the Film Score Monthly label, in a two-disc edition and featuring excerpts of Manz's narration.

The country music heard during the harvest party is the Cajun tune "Swamp Dance", played and sung by Doug Kershaw. Kershaw is seen playing the fiddle with a broken bow-string. Additional songs were contributed by guitarist Leo Kottke. Kottke was originally approached by Malick for the entire score, but declined.

== Reception and legacy ==
=== Box office ===
Days of Heaven opened theatrically on September 13, 1978, at Cinema I on 3rd Avenue in New York City. It had screened the night before for sponsors and benefactors of the Film Society of Lincoln Center. It was shown at the Cannes Film Festival, in 1979, where Malick won the award for Best Director—making him the first American director to win the award since Jules Dassin in 1955 for Rififi (in a joint win shared with Sergei Vasilyev for Heroes of Shipka). The film was a commercial failure: its box office gross of $3,446,749 was only slightly more than it cost to make the film ($3 million), but Charles Bluhdorn who ran Paramount's parent company Gulf + Western, loved it so much he offered Malick $1 million for his next project, whatever it was.

=== Contemporary response ===
Critical reaction was initially varied. Many critics found the film visually beautiful, but others found the narrative confounding. Dave Kehr of The Chicago Reader wrote: "Terrence Malick's remarkably rich second feature is a story of human lives touched and passed over by the divine, told in a rush of stunning and precise imagery. Nestor Almendros's cinematography is as sharp and vivid as Malick's narration is elliptical and enigmatic. The result is a film that hovers just beyond our grasp—mysterious, beautiful, and, very possibly, a masterpiece". Variety called the film "one of the great cinematic achievements of the 1970s." Gene Siskel of the Chicago Tribune also wrote that the film "truly tests a film critic's power of description ... Some critics have complained that the Days of Heaven story is too slight. I suppose it is, but, frankly, you don't think about it while the movie is playing". Time magazine's Frank Rich wrote, "Days of Heaven is lush with brilliant images". The periodical went on to name it one of the best films of 1978.

Detractors targeted the film's direction of storyline and structure. In his review for The New York Times, Harold C. Schonberg wrote, "Days of Heaven never really makes up its mind what it wants to be. It ends up something between a Texas pastoral and Cavalleria rusticana. Back of what basically is a conventional plot is all kinds of fancy, self-conscious cineaste techniques." Monica Eng of the Chicago Tribune criticized the lack of significant plot and stated, "The story becomes secondary to the visuals".

The Chicago Sun-Times' Roger Ebert responded to these criticisms in a reevaluation in 1997, saying:

Terrence Malick's "Days of Heaven" has been praised for its painterly images and evocative score, but criticized for its muted emotions: Although passions erupt in a deadly love triangle, all the feelings are somehow held at arm's length. This observation is true enough, if you think only about the actions of the adults in the story. But watching this 1978 film again recently, I was struck more than ever with the conviction that this is the story of a teenage girl, told by her, and its subject is the way that hope and cheer have been beaten down in her heart. We do not feel the full passion of the adults because it is not her passion: It is seen at a distance, as a phenomenon, like the weather, or the plague of grasshoppers that signals the beginning of the end.

=== Retrospective response ===
Days of Heaven was re-evaluated years after its original theatrical release and is considered a pioneering achievement in cinema. On Rotten Tomatoes the film has an approval rating of 93% based on reviews from 125 critics, with an average rating of 8.8/10. The website's consensus reads, "Illuminated by magic hour glow and wistful performances, Days of Heaven is a visual masterpiece that finds eloquent poetry in its spare scenario." On Metacritic it has a weighted average score of 94 out of 100 based on reviews from 20 critics, indicating "universal acclaim". It is frequently cited by critics and scholars, including Roger Ebert, as one of the most visually arresting films ever made; in 1997, Ebert added Days of Heaven to his Great Movies list. In a 2007 re-evaluation for Slant Magazine Nick Schager called it "the greatest film ever made." That same year, the Library of Congress selected the film for preservation in the United States National Film Registry.

In 2012, Time included the film among the 20 new entries added to the magazine's "All-Time 100 Movies" list. The same year, Days of Heaven ranked #112 in the British Film Institute's decennial Sight & Sound critics' poll of the greatest films ever made, and #132 in the directors' poll of the same magazine. The New York Times placed the film on its Best 1000 Movies Ever list.

=== Awards and nominations ===
Per Academy custom, the award was given solely to principal photographer Néstor Almendros. Previous winner Haskell Wexler had also received credit on the film (for "additional photography"). Almendros mentioned Wexler in his acceptance speech, saying, "I would like to thank all the people that helped to get these images, all the camera operators and very specially Haskell Wexler who came at the end of the movie when I had to leave on a previous commitment."

Award		Category	Recipient(s)	Result	Ref.
Academy Awards	1978	Best Cinematography	Néstor Almendros	Won	
Academy Awards	1978	Best Costume Design	Patricia Norris	Nominated	
Academy Awards	1978	Best Original Score	Ennio Morricone	Nominated	
Academy Awards	1978	Best Sound	John Wilkinson, Robert W. Glass Jr., John T. Reitz, Barry Thomas	Nominated	
British Academy Film Awards	1980	Best Original Music	Ennio Morricone	Won	
Golden Globe Awards	1979	Best Motion Picture – Drama	—N/a	Nominated	
Golden Globe Awards	1979	Best Director	Terrence Malick	Nominated	
Cannes Film Festival	1979	Palme d'Or	Terrence Malick	Nominated	
Cannes Film Festival	1979	Best Director	Terrence Malick	Won	
National Society of Film Critics	1978	Best Film	—N/a	4th place	
National Society of Film Critics	1978	Best Director	Terrence Malick	Won	
National Society of Film Critics	1978	Best Cinematography	Néstor Almendros	Won	

=== Home media ===
Days of Heaven has been released on home video on different formats over the years. Its first notable release was on home video in the early 1980s, followed by various reissues in the 1980s and 1990s. In particular, the film was released on a special widescreen edition format on home video to preserve the film's original theatrical aspect ratio, which was uncommon for videotapes at the time, with majority of them being pan and scan, a technique that crops a portion of the image to focus on the more important composition. This often results in the side being cut out and the middle center being the only remaining part. Days of Heaven premiered on DVD on March 30, 1999, with no special features. The feature itself was presented in widescreen and released by Paramount Pictures, the copyright owner of the film itself. It was re-released on DVD in 2004, again without special supplements.

On October 23, 2007, the Criterion Collection released a DVD of the film, with digitally remastered sound and picture, supervised by Malick, editor Billy Weber and camera operator John Bailey. Bonus features include an audio commentary by art director Jack Fisk, editor Billy Weber, costume designer Patricia Norris, and casting director Dianne Crittenden; an audio interview with Richard Gere; video interviews with Sam Shepard, Haskell Wexler, and John Bailey; and a booklet featuring an essay on the film by Adrian Martin and an extract from Néstor Almendros' autobiography. The Criterion Collection released a Blu-ray of the film on March 7, 2010, and a 4K Ultra HD Blu-Ray on December 5, 2023.
