= Dianne Crittenden =

American casting director (1941–2024)

- Born: August 6, 1941; Jamaica, Queens, U.S.
- Died: March 20, 2024 (aged 82); Pacific Palisades, Los Angeles, U.S.
- Education: Hofstra University
- Occupation: Casting director
- Years active: 1970s–2015
- Notable work: Spider-Man 2, Star Wars
- Spouse(s): George Drabek (died 2023)
- Children: 1

Dianne Crittenden (August 6, 1941 – March 20, 2024) was an American casting director.

== Early life and career ==
Crittenden was born in Jamaica, Queens on August 6, 1941. She graduated from Baldwin High School and Hofstra University. She started her career as an elementary school teacher. Collaborating with Howard Zieff, Crittenden ventured into film and television. She was his casting director for Hearts of the West (1975) and The Main Event (1979). Her casting career lasted more than forty years. Crittenden served as head of casting at Marble Arch Productions and Warner Bros. Crittenden's film credits include The In-Laws, Lucky Lady (1975), Going in Style (1979), Honeysuckle Rose (1980), On Golden Pond (1981), Monkey Shines (1988), Murphy’s Romance (1985), Stanley & Iris (1990), Thirteen Days (2000) and The World’s Fastest Indian (2005), The Mosquito Coast (1986), Green Card (1990), The Thin Red Line, On Golden Pond, Witness, Badlands, Oh! God, Howard the Duck, Wise Guys and Spiderman 2, along with Star Wars: Episode IV — A New Hope, Days of Heaven and Pretty Woman. Her television credits include The Awakening Land, Sybil and The New Dick Van Dyke Show. She was nominated for a CSA Artios Award for Witness. Crittenden also worked in casting in Harry and Tonto (1974), The Day of the Locust (1975) and A Star Is Born (1976). She also had bit roles in three films, including Crocodile Dundee II. Crittenden's final film credit as casting director was the Little Boy (2015).

== Personal life and death ==
Crittenden was married to George Drabek, who died in 2023. She had one stepdaughter. Crittenden died at her home in Pacific Palisades, Los Angeles on March 20, 2024, at age 82. She had suffered from cancer prior to her death.
