= Linda Manz =

American actress (1961–2020)

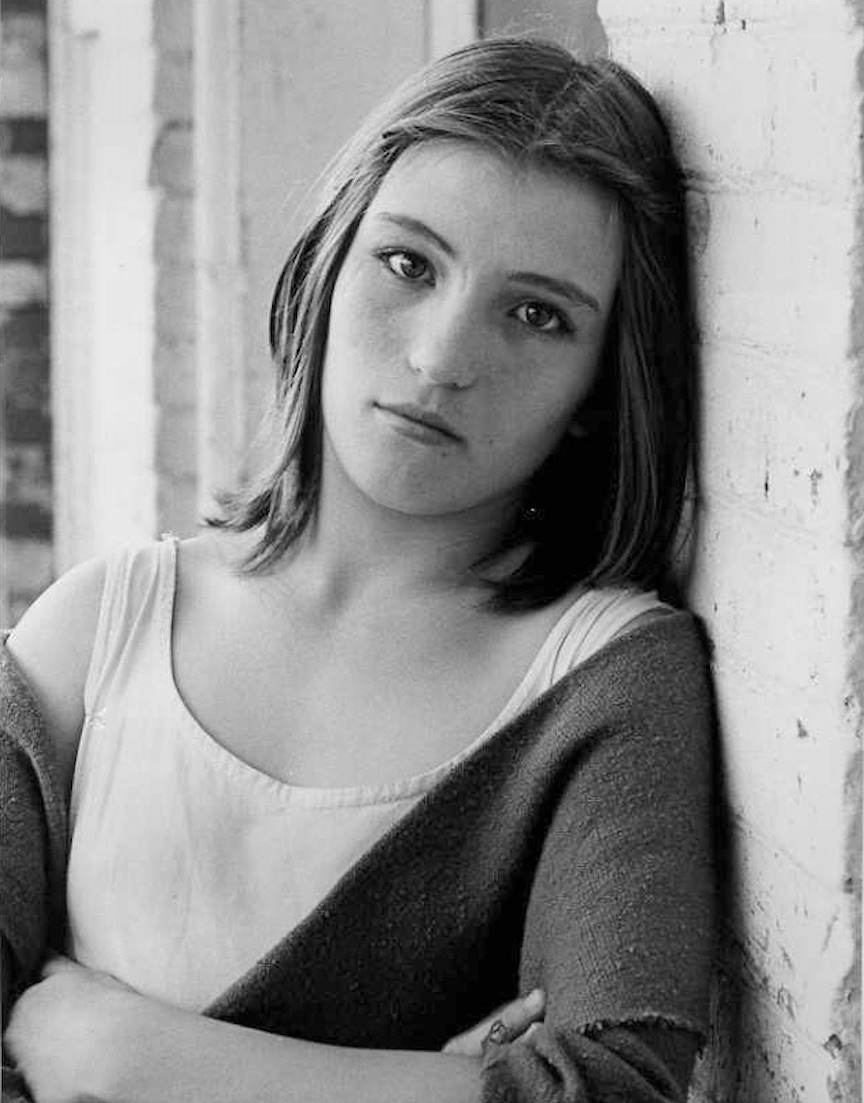
- Manz in Orphan Train (1979)
- Born: Linda Ann Manz; August 20, 1961; New York City, New York, U.S.
- Died: August 14, 2020 (aged 58); Palmdale, California, U.S.
- Occupation: Actress
- Years active: 1978–1997
- Spouse: Bobby Guthrie (m. 1985)
- Children: 3

Linda Ann Manz (August 20, 1961 – August 14, 2020) was an American actress. She made her feature film debut at age 15 in Terrence Malick's period drama Days of Heaven (1978), playing an adolescent girl growing up in rural Texas in 1916. She followed this with a supporting role in The Wanderers (1979). Manz earned critical acclaim for her portrayal of a troubled teenage girl from a dysfunctional family in Dennis Hopper's drama film Out of the Blue (1980).

Manz stepped away from her acting profession in the mid-1980s and relocated to Southern California, where she lived outside the public eye and focused on raising her three children. She returned to acting in 1997 with small roles in Harmony Korine's film Gummo and David Fincher's thriller The Game. She developed a strong cult following that began in the 1990s.

== Early life ==
Linda Ann Manz was born in New York City to Sophie E. Manz, and never knew her father. Growing up in Upper Manhattan, Manz had a troubled childhood and a difficult relationship with her mother. She frequently ran away from home and attended several schools. Manz told People magazine in 1979: "For a long time, I was always asking people to adopt me". She was initially indifferent to acting but, as she later explained in 2011, it was her mother, a cleaner at the World Trade Center, who encouraged her to seek a career as an actress. Her mother insisted that Manz attend a performing arts academy that taught acting and dancing.

== Career ==
While she was at an academy for show business, a teacher told her that casting director Barbara L. Claman was looking for streetwise kids to appear in a new Hollywood film. Manz turned up unannounced at Claman's office, "smoking and looking all of 10 years old" but, according to Claman, "she had that special quality we wanted." This introduction eventually led in 1976 to Manz being selected at age 15 by Terrence Malick to act in his second film, Days of Heaven. She plays a streetwise orphan who joins her older brother and his lover when they flee Chicago in 1916, and find work, then refuge, with a wealthy Texas farmer. The film was not released until 1978 due to Malick's lengthy editing.

Manz's part was initially smaller, but Malick was so impressed by her that he made a last-minute decision to have her improvise an unscripted narration. Manz told interviewers, years later, that, "I just watched the movie and rambled on," and "They took whatever dialogue they liked." She received excellent reviews, with critic Roger Ebert saying, "Her voice sounds utterly authentic; it seems beyond performance."

Manz appeared alongside Ken Wahl, Karen Allen and Erland Van Lidth de Jeude in the 1979 teenage-gang drama The Wanderers, directed by Philip Kaufman, Her next role was in the short-lived CBS series Dorothy. Manz next had a spot in the 1979 television movie Orphan Train as Sarah, one of many orphans relocated from eastern orphanages to farms in the West and Midwest in the late 1800s/early 1900s.

She received notice as the lead in Dennis Hopper's influential cult film Out of the Blue (1980). In Hopper's drama she played Cebe, a troubled Elvis-obsessed teenager who masks her vulnerability with a punk attitude. Over a CB radio she broadcasts statements such as "Kill all hippies!" and "Subvert normality!" Her voice was subsequently sampled by Primal Scream in their song "Kill All Hippies", which was released in 2000.

In 1981, she starred opposite Leif Garrett and Ralph Seymour in the television film Longshot, which focused on a group of teenage foosball enthusiasts. In 1985, Manz appeared in a small role as a robber in "The Snow Queen", an episode of Faerie Tale Theatre.

By the mid-1980s, she had disappeared from the industry. Manz insisted this was not due to any dramatic walking-out-on-Hollywood story, telling Time Out in 1997: "There was a whole bunch of new young actors out there, and I was kind of getting lost in the shuffle, so I laid back and had three kids. Now, I enjoy just staying home and cooking soup."

The director Harmony Korine, who admired her work, sought out Manz after her 16-year absence from the screen and she took on the role of a fast-talking, tap-dancing mother of one of the main characters in Gummo (1997), Korine's nihilistic portrayal of marginalized life in a small town. Manz followed this with the small role of the roommate of Deborah Kara Unger's character Christine in David Fincher's thriller film The Game (1997), the last time she appeared on screen.

== Personal life ==
In 1985, Manz married Bobbie L. Guthrie, a camera operator in the film industry. Together they had three children: Michael, Christopher and William. She lived later in Antelope Valley, California. Her son Christopher predeceased her in 2018.

Manz died in Palmdale, California on August 14, 2020, aged 58, of complications from pneumonia and lung cancer.

== Legacy ==
Following her death in 2020, Manz's work—particularly her lead performance in Out of the Blue—has received renewed critical attention through restorations and retrospectives, and she has been cited as a cult figure in American independent cinema.

== Filmography ==
=== Film ===
Year	Title	Role	Notes	Ref.
1978	Days of Heaven	Linda		
1978	King of the Gypsies		Uncredited	
1979	The Wanderers	Peewee		
1979	Boardwalk	Girl Satan		
1980	Out of the Blue	Cebe		
1981	Longshot	Maxine Gripp		
1983	Mir reicht's … ich steig aus!	Linda		
1997	Gummo	Solomon's Mother		
1997	The Game	Amy		
1999	Buddy Boy		Uncredited	
2016	Along for the Ride	Herself	Documentary	

=== Television ===
- 1979 Dorothy as Frankie (4 episodes; "The Bookworm Turns", "Hard Hearted Hamlet", "Lies and Whisper", "Give My Regrets to Broadway")
- 1979 Orphan Train as Sarah
- 1985 Faerie Tale Theatre as Robber Girl ("The Snow Queen")
- 2009 This Beat Goes On: Canadian Pop Music in the 1970s as Herself, documentary
