= Vanishing Point (Primal Scream album) =

Studio album by Primal Scream
- Released: 7 July 1997
- Studio: Chalk Farm Studios, London
- Genre: Electronic rock; dub; neo-psychedelia; krautrock
- Length: 53:31
- Label: Creation; Reprise
- Producer: Primal Scream; Brendan Lynch; Andrew Weatherall

Primal Scream chronology
Give Out But Don't Give Up (1994)	Vanishing Point (1997)	Echo Dek (1997)

Singles from Vanishing Point
- 1. "Kowalski" Released: 5 May 1997; 2. "Star" Released: 16 June 1997; 3. "Burning Wheel" Released: 13 October 1997; 4. "If They Move, Kill 'Em" Released: 16 February 1998

Vanishing Point is the fifth studio album by Scottish rock band Primal Scream. It was released on 7 July 1997 in the United Kingdom by Creation Records and in the United States by Reprise Records. It peaked at number 2 on the UK Albums Chart. The album shows inspiration from genres such as dub, ambient, dance music, and krautrock, as well as bands such as Motörhead, Can, and the Stooges. It was the band's first album to feature Gary 'Mani' Mounfield, formerly of the Stone Roses, on bass, although Marco Nelson played bass on "Burning Wheel", "Star", "If They Move, Kill 'Em'", and "Stuka". Other guest appearances on Vanishing Point include Augustus Pablo, Glen Matlock, and the Memphis Horns.

== Background ==
Gillespie has described the album as an anarcho-syndicalist speedfreak road-movie record. It is named after and inspired by the 1971 film Vanishing Point, especially the song "Kowalski", which is meant to be an alternative soundtrack of the movie. Lead singer Bobby Gillespie said, "The music in the film is hippy music, so we thought, 'Why not record some music that really reflects the mood of the film?' It's always been a favourite of the band, we love the air of paranoia and speed- freak righteousness. It's impossible to get hold of now, which is great! It's a pure underground film, rammed with claustrophobia."

== Recording ==
The album was written and recorded with the aid of two portable eight-track recording studios at the band's Chalk Farm rehearsal rooms. The entire album was written and recorded in two months and mixed an additional month. On their cover of "Motorhead", Gillespie sung the first verse through a Darth Vader mask. According to an article, much of the album came from live improvisation, and "Then later on we'd layer other sounds and loops over the top, and the vocals," Gillespie said in an interview. The track "If They Move, Kill 'Em" was originally to have included a sample from Sam Peckinpah's film The Wild Bunch (the song title is one of the earliest lines of dialogue spoken in the film), but it could not be cleared in time.

== Release ==
Vanishing Point was released on 7 July 1997 in the United Kingdom by Creation Records and in the United States by Reprise Records. It is the fifth album by Primal Scream.

Author Irvine Welsh scripted the video for the album's first single, "Kowalski," which was directed by musician Douglas Hart. The video features a Dodge Challenger and super model Kate Moss beating up the band. Gillespie described the video as a cross between Faster Pussycat, Kill! Kill! and The Sweeney.

== Critical reception ==
Professional ratings
Review scores
Source	Rating
AllMusic	4.5/5 stars
Entertainment Weekly	A
The Guardian	5/5 stars
Los Angeles Times	3/4 stars
NME	9/10
Pitchfork	8.3/10
Rolling Stone	4/5 stars
The Rolling Stone Album Guide	4.5/5 stars
Spin	8/10
The Village Voice	B+

Vanishing Point received positive reviews from critics, who welcomed it as a return to form after 1994's Give Out But Don't Give Up. NME named it the 4th best album of 1997. In 2012, NME journalist Mark Beaumont ranked it as the band's fourth best album, calling it "a brilliant record for its statement of intent alone – it stamped in stone Primal Scream's mandate to never repeat themselves and consistently indulge their experimental spirit". The album was also included in 1001 Albums You Must Hear Before You Die.

== Track listing ==
All tracks are written by Bobby Gillespie, Andrew Innes, Robert Young, and Martin Duffy, except where noted.

No.	Title	Writer(s)	Length
1.	"Burning Wheel"		7:06
2.	"Get Duffy"		4:09
3.	"Kowalski"	Bobby Gillespie, Andrew Innes, Robert Young, Martin Duffy, Gary Mounfield	5:50
4.	"Star"		4:24
5.	"If They Move, Kill 'Em"		3:01
6.	"Out of the Void"		3:59
7.	"Stuka"		5:36
8.	"Medication"		3:52
9.	"Motörhead"	Lemmy Kilmister	3:38
10.	"Trainspotting"		8:07
11.	"Long Life"		3:49

== Personnel ==
Credits adapted from liner notes.

Primal Scream

- Bobby Gillespie – vocals
- Andrew Innes – guitar, bass
- Robert Young – guitar, programming, keyboards
- Martin Duffy – keyboards, programming, melodica
- Gary 'Mani' Mounfield – bass
- Paul Mulreany – drums

Production

- Primal Scream – production (except 10)
- Brendan Lynch – production (except 10)
- Andrew Weatherall – production (10)
- Max Hayes – engineering (except 10)
- Tim Holmes – engineering (10)
- George Shilling – mix engineering (2, 3, 11)

=== Guests ===
- Marco Nelson – bass guitar (1, 4, 5, 7)
- Augustus Pablo – melodica (4)
- Glen Matlock – bass guitar (8)
- Pandit Dinesh – tablas (4, 6)
- Iain Dixon – bass clarinet (2)
- Duncan Mackay – trumpet (2, 5)
- Jim Hunt – saxophone (2, 5)
- Wayne Jackson – trumpet (4)
- Andrew Love – saxophone (4)
- Paul Harte – harmonica (8), synthesizer (9)

== Charts ==
Chart (1997)	Peak position
Australian Albums (ARIA)	64
Austrian Albums (Ö3 Austria)	31
Finnish Albums (Suomen virallinen lista)	31
German Albums (Offizielle Top 100)	97
New Zealand Albums (RMNZ)	23
Scottish Albums (OCC)	2
Swedish Albums (Sverigetopplistan)	3
Swiss Albums (Schweizer Hitparade)	47
UK Albums (OCC)	2
US Heatseekers Albums (Billboard)	34

== Certifications ==
Region	Certification	Certified units/sales
Japan (RIAJ)	Gold	100,000^{^}
^{^} Shipments figures based on certification alone.
