= Kowalski (song) =

1997 single by Primal Scream

Single by Primal Scream

from the album Vanishing Point
- B-side: "96 Tears"; "Know Your Rights"
- Released: 5 May 1997
- Length: 5:58 (album version); 4:19 (radio edit)
- Label: Creation; Reprise
- Songwriters: Martin Duffy; Bobby Gillespie; Andrew Innes; Robert Young; Gary Mounfield
- Producers: Brendan Lynch; Primal Scream

Primal Scream singles chronology
"(I'm Gonna) Cry Myself Blind" (1994)	"Kowalski" (1997)	"Star" (1997)

"Kowalski" is a song by Scottish rock band Primal Scream, released on 5 May 1997 as the lead single from their fifth studio album Vanishing Point. The song contains a drum sample from "Halleluhwah" by Can and an interpolation of the bassline from "Get Off Your Ass and Jam" by Funkadelic, and is named after the main character of the 1971 film Vanishing Point, played by Barry Newman; it samples dialogue from the film.

It was made the NME single of the week. The song peaked at number eight on the UK Singles Chart and became the band's highest-charting single in Scotland, reaching number two. In Australia, the song was a minor hit on the ARIA Singles Chart, peaking at number 79.

== Music video ==
Scripted by Irvine Welsh and directed by Steven Hanft, the video features Kate Moss and Devon Aoki stealing a Dodge Challenger before then tracking down and assaulting the band. The band's lead singer, Bobby Gillespie, described the video as "a cross between Faster Pussycat, Kill! Kill! and The Sweeney."

== Track listings ==
7-inch single and Europe 2-track CD single
No.	Title	Writer(s)	Length
1.	"Kowalski"	Gillespie, Innes, Young, Duffy, Mounfield	5:58
2.	"96 Tears" (? and the Mysterians cover)	Rudy Martínez	2:57

Europe 12-inch single
No.	Title	Writer(s)	Length
1.	"Kowalski"	Gillespie, Innes, Young, Duffy, Mounfield	5:58
2.	"96 Tears" (? and the Mysterians cover)	Martínez	2:57
3.	"Kowalski" (Automator mix)	Gillespie, Innes, Young, Duffy, Mounfield	5:11
4.	"Know Your Rights" (The Clash cover)	Joe Strummer, Mick Jones	4:19

European and Australian CD single
No.	Title	Writer(s)	Length
1.	"Kowalski"	Gillespie, Innes, Young, Duffy, Mounfield	5:58
2.	"96 Tears" (? and the Mysterians cover)	Martínez	2:57
3.	"Know Your Rights" (The Clash cover)	Strummer, Jones	4:19
4.	"Kowalski" (Automator mix)	Gillespie, Innes, Young, Duffy, Mounfield	5:11

US CD maxi-single
No.	Title	Writer(s)	Length
1.	"Kowalski" (radio edit)	Gillespie, Innes, Young, Duffy, Mounfield	4:18
2.	"Kowalski"	Gillespie, Innes, Young, Duffy, Mounfield	5:58
3.	"96 Tears" (? and the Mysterians cover)	Martínez	2:57
4.	"Know Your Rights" (The Clash cover)	Strummer, Jones	4:19
5.	"Kowalski" (Adrian Sherwood dub)	Gillespie, Innes, Young, Duffy, Mounfield	5:01

Japan CD maxi-single
No.	Title	Writer(s)	Length
1.	"Kowalski"	Gillespie, Innes, Young, Duffy, Mounfield	5:58
2.	"Star"	Gillespie, Innes, Young, Duffy	4:25
3.	"96 Tears" (? and the Mysterians cover)	Martínez	2:57
4.	"Kowalski" (radio edit)	Gillespie, Innes, Young, Duffy, Mounfield	4:18
5.	"Kowalski" (Automator mix)	Gillespie, Innes, Young, Duffy, Mounfield	5:11

== Charts ==
Chart (1997)	Peak position
Australia (ARIA)	79
Europe (Eurochart Hot 100)	58
Finland (Suomen virallinen lista)	16
Scotland Singles (OCC)	2
Sweden (Sverigetopplistan)	20
UK Singles (OCC)	8

== Release history ==
Region	Date	Format(s)	Label(s)	Ref.
United Kingdom	5 May 1997	7-inch vinyl; 12-inch vinyl; CD	Creation	
Japan	28 May 1997	CD	Creation	
