= Jagz Kooner =

British record producer

Jagz Kooner (born Jagjit Singh Kooner, 1967) is a British record producer of Indian descent, who has worked with Radio 4, Manic Street Preachers, Garbage, Infadels and Primal Scream for whom he co-produced their cover version of the song "Some Velvet Morning" along with model Kate Moss.

He has created remixes for Massive Attack; the remix of their song "Butterfly Caught" contains additional vocals from English electronic music vocalist Tara McDonald. His remix "My Beautiful Friend" by the Charlatans was so groundbreaking that it inspired Eddy Temple-Morris, a DJ at the XFM radio station to form a show dedicated to remixes. Kooner also worked with Rammstein, Siobhan Fahey, Ladytron, Adam Freeland, dEUS, Kasabian and more recently Reverend and the Makers. His remix of "Swastika Eyes" by Primal Scream appears as one of two remixes of the track on the XTRMNTR album. He remixed two songs from the Oasis album Dig Out Your Soul. On the bonus CD available only as part of the Deluxe Edition, Kooner remixed the first single "The Shock of the Lightning", as well as the album track "The Turning". He has also been keenly involved in the UK mash-up scene. Kooner has also remixed "Mind Killer" by Adam Freeland. In 2012, Kooner remixed the track "Petals" by Officers and Gary Numan, which was released to raise awareness for the suicide prevention charity CALM (Campaign Against Living Miserably).

== Other bands ==
He was also a member of the bands the Aloof and Sabres of Paradise with Andrew Weatherall, and the Reverend and the Makers side project Reverend Soundsystem or otherwise known as RSS.
