= Myōshōji River =

Coordinates: 35°42′56″N 139°41′51″E

Myōshōji
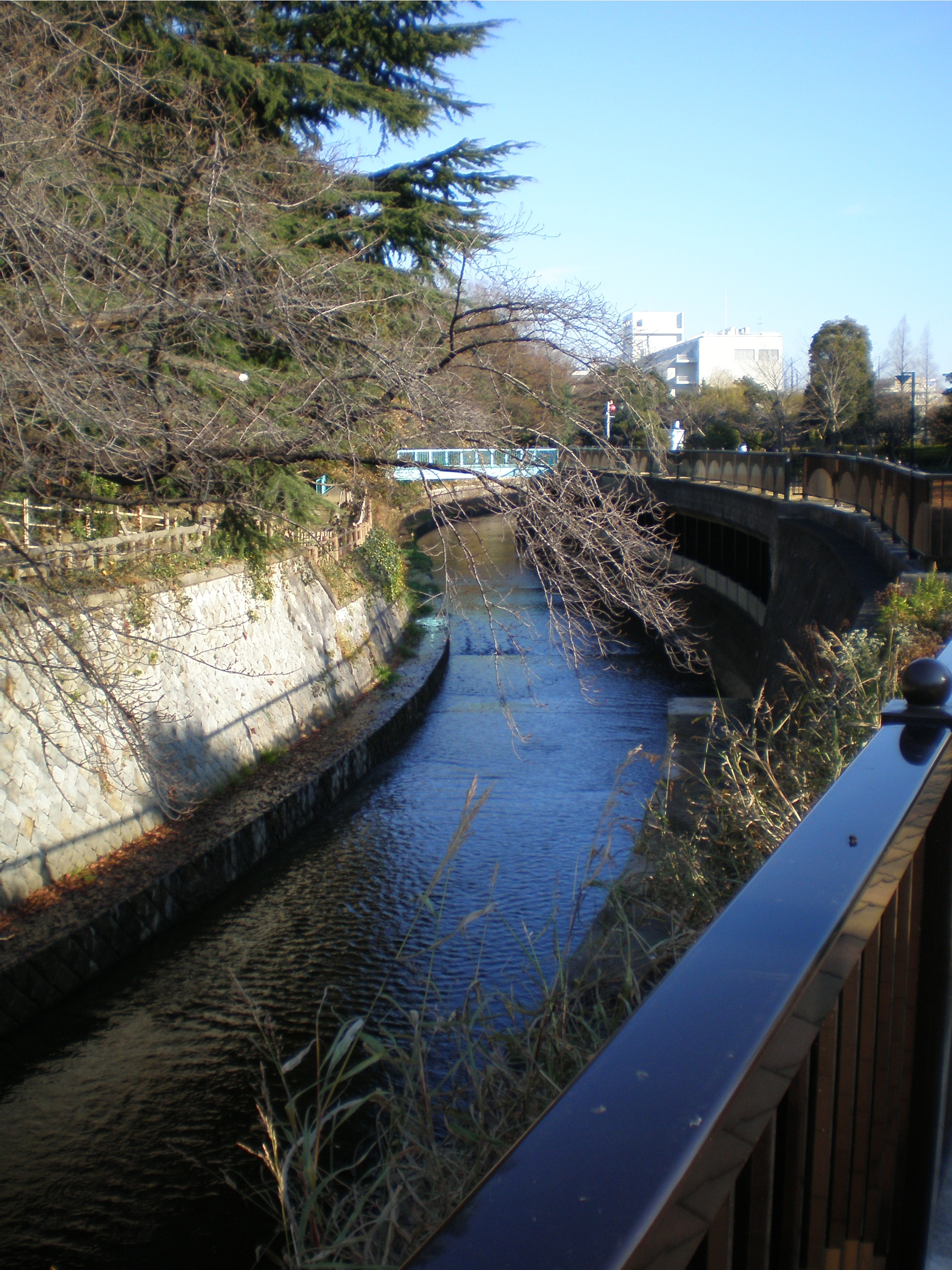
- Myōshōji River in Tetsugaku-dō Park, Nakano, Tokyo, Japan

- Location within Japan

Location
- Country: Japan
- Region: Kantō
- District: Suginami Ward, Nakano Ward, Shinjuku Ward

The Myōshōji River (妙正寺川, Myōshōji-gawa) is designated as a Class A river by the Japanese government with a length of 9.7 km and a basin area of 21.4 km².

== Course ==
It starts in the Myōshōji Temple pond in Suginami Ward, and joins the Egota River later on. It flows into the Kanda River (Takadanobaba Channel) in Shinjuku Ward.

== Recent history ==
Due to the progress of urbanization, the water retention capacity of the Myōshōji River has fallen and there is an increasing risk of water damage. To cope with this situation, the Tokyo Metropolitan Government has constructed revetments that can handle rainfall of up to 50 millimeters per hour.
