= Egota-no-Mori Park =

Public park in Tokyo, Japan

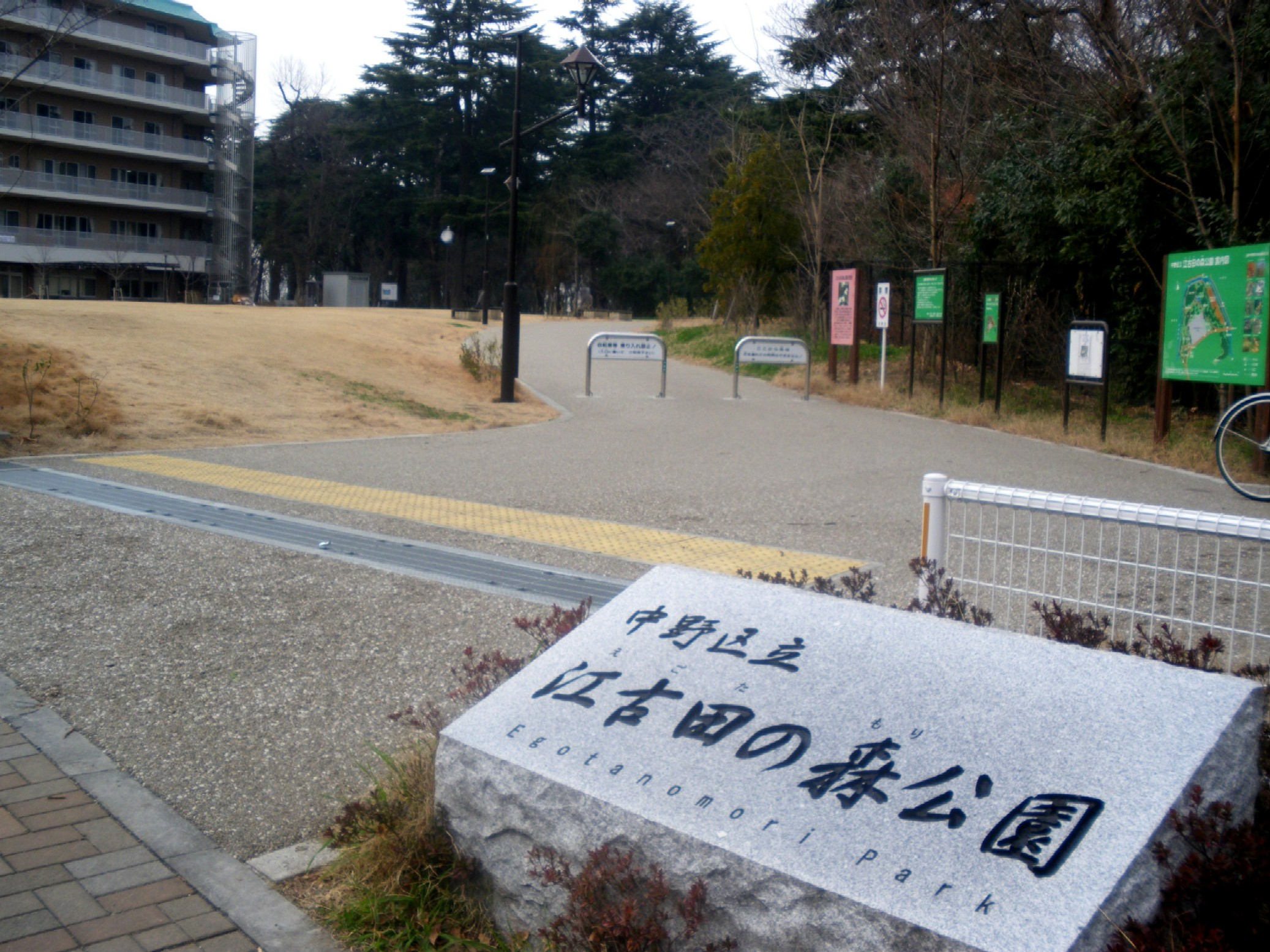
- The main (south-east) entrance to the park
- Interactive map of Egota-no-Mori Park
- Location: Nakano, Tokyo, Japan
- Coordinates: 35°43′49″N 139°39′57″E
- Area: 60,224 square metres (14.882 acres)
- Created: 1971
- Public transit: Shin-egota Station

Egota-no-Mori Park (江古田の森公園, Egota no Mori Kōen) is a public park in Nakano Ward, Tokyo, Japan. It is the largest park in Nakano Ward.

== Facilities ==
Within the grounds of the park there is a large, six-story building called Tokyo General Health and Welfare Center Egota-no-Mori (東京総合保健福祉センター江古田の森, Tōkyō Sōgō Hoken Fukushi Shisetsu Egota no Mori).The park also has a multipurpose open area, wooded area, wooden playground equipment, sandbox, swings, water fountain, toilet (with wheelchair access), study room, benches, lawn, biotope pond, and dogwood hill.

== Gallery ==
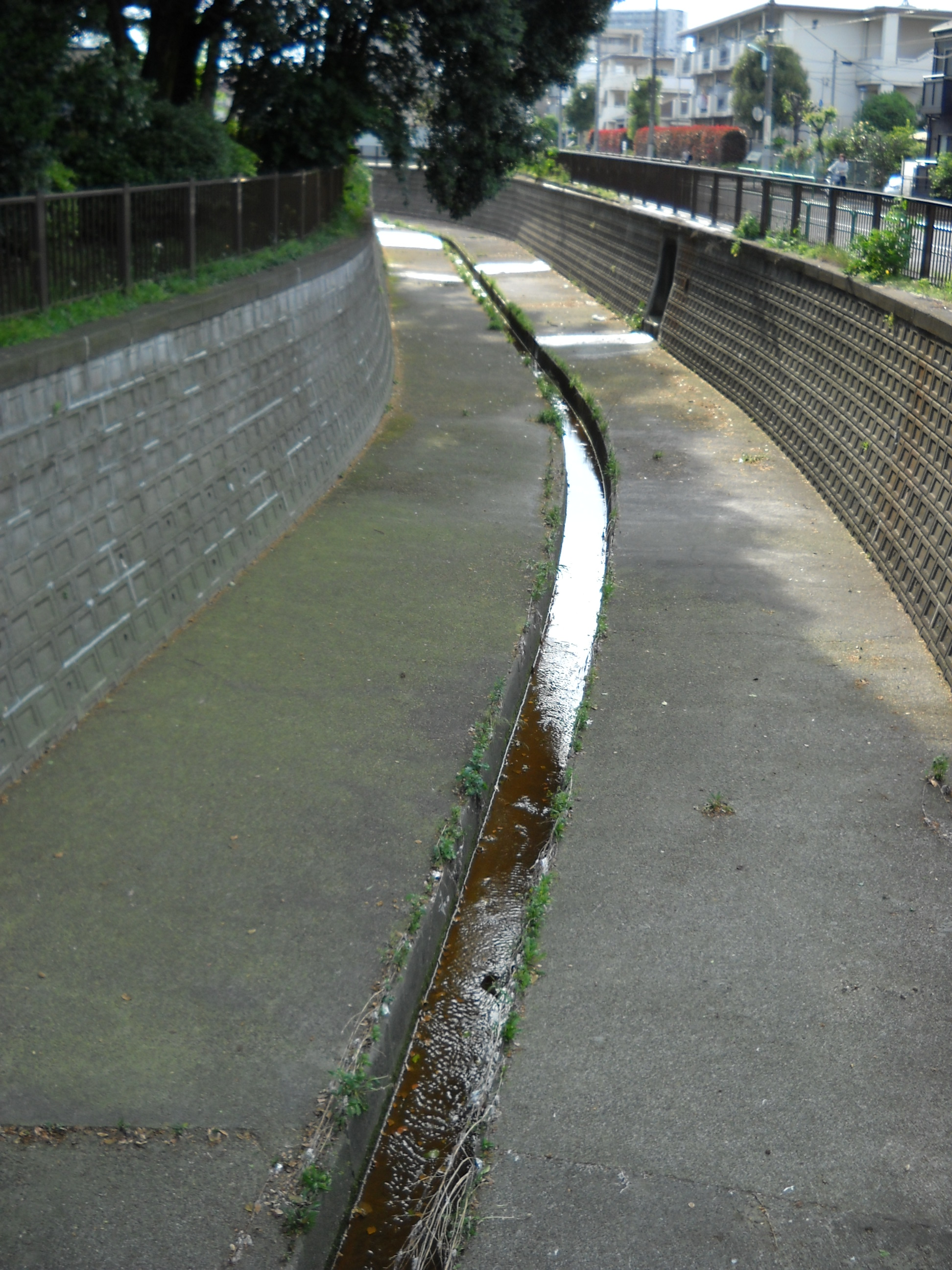
Egota River flowing through the park

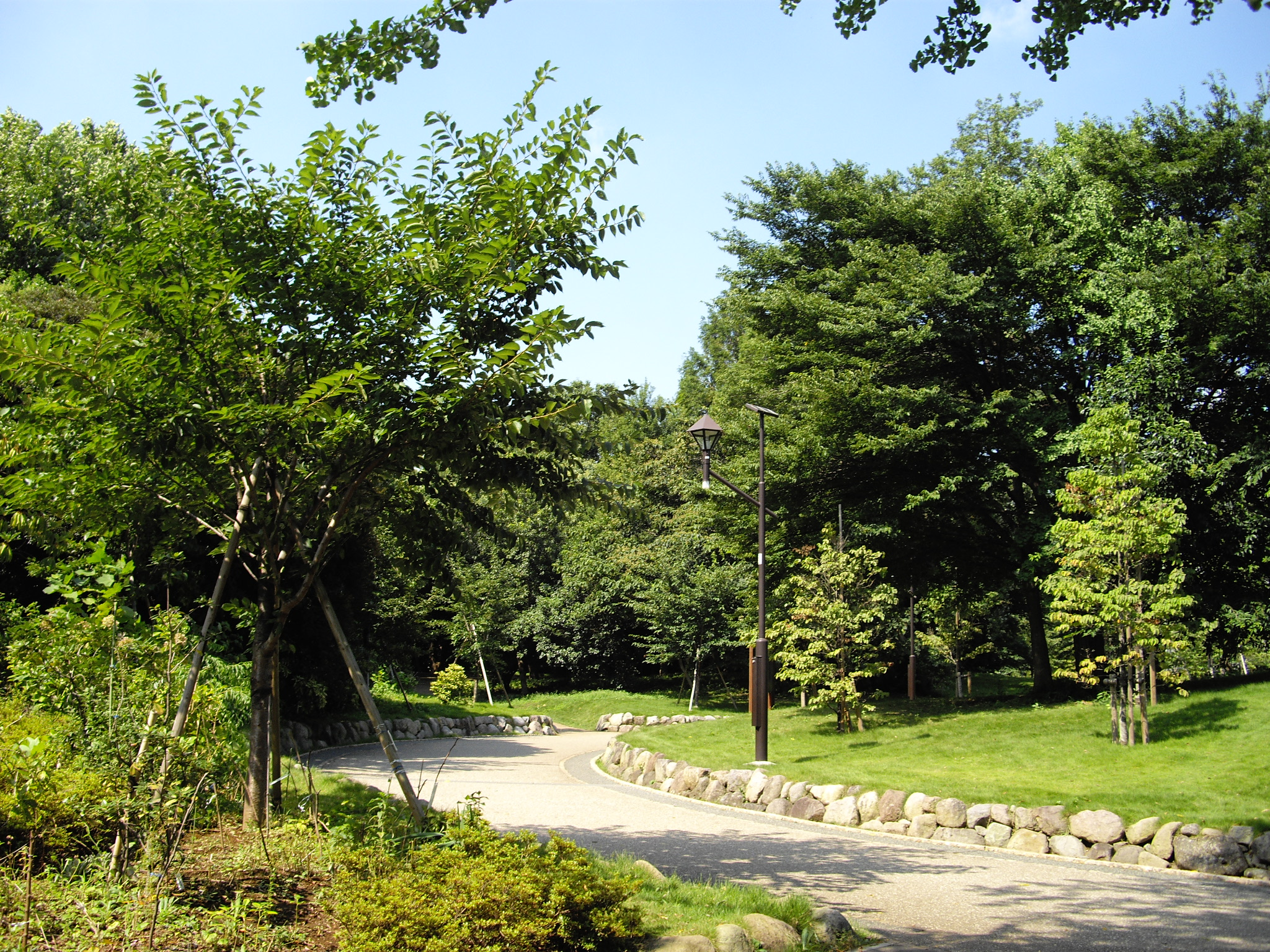
View inside the park

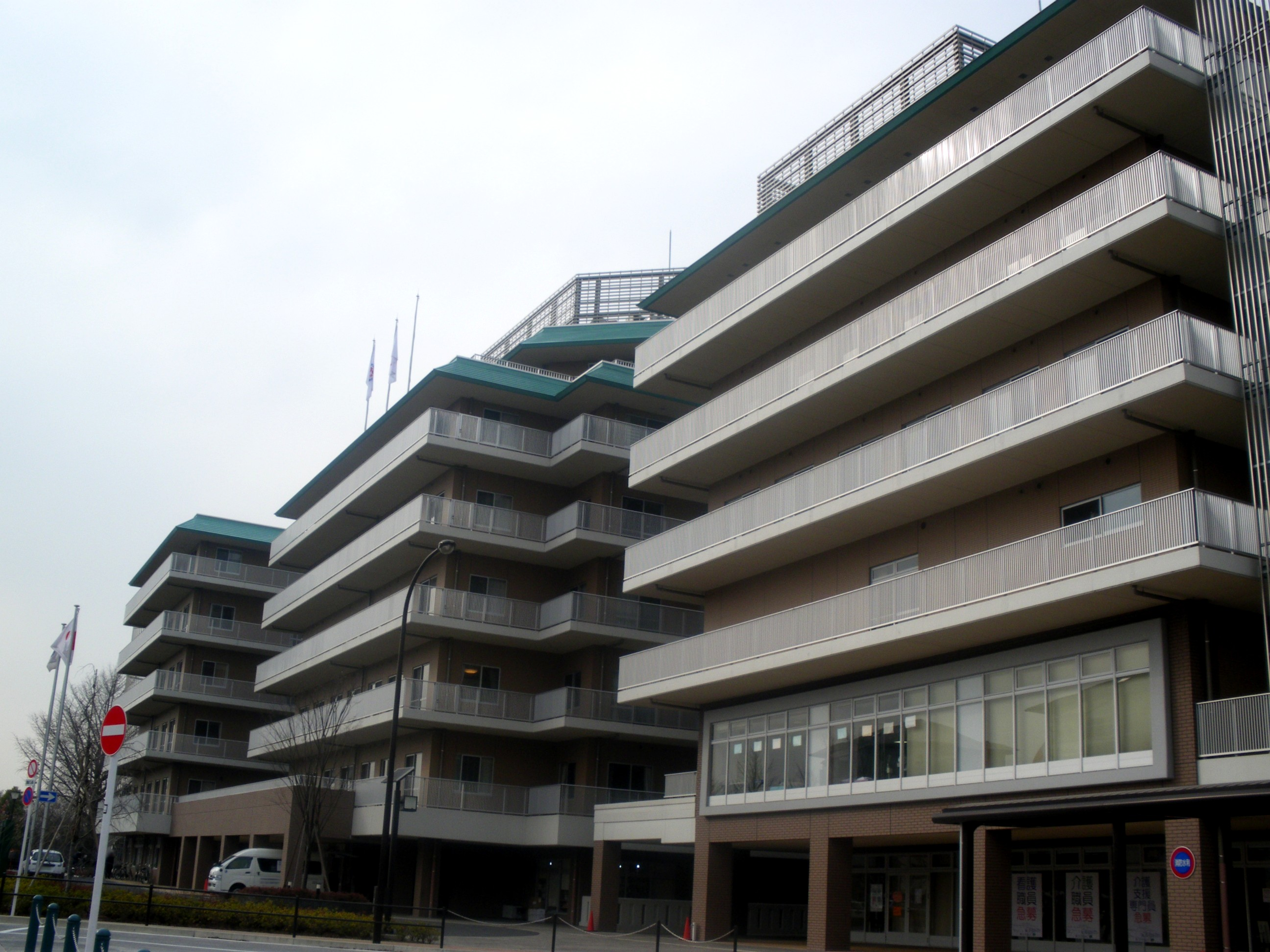
The welfare facility inside the park

== Access ==
The park is a 6-minute walk from Shin-egota Station on the Toei Ōedo subway line. It can also be reached by bus from Ekoda Station (7 mins), Nerima Station (19 mins) and Nakano Station (20 mins). The park's opening hours are from 6 a.m. to 11 p.m., and the entry is free of charge.

== See also ==
- Parks and gardens in Tokyo
- National Parks of Japan
