= Egota River =

Egota
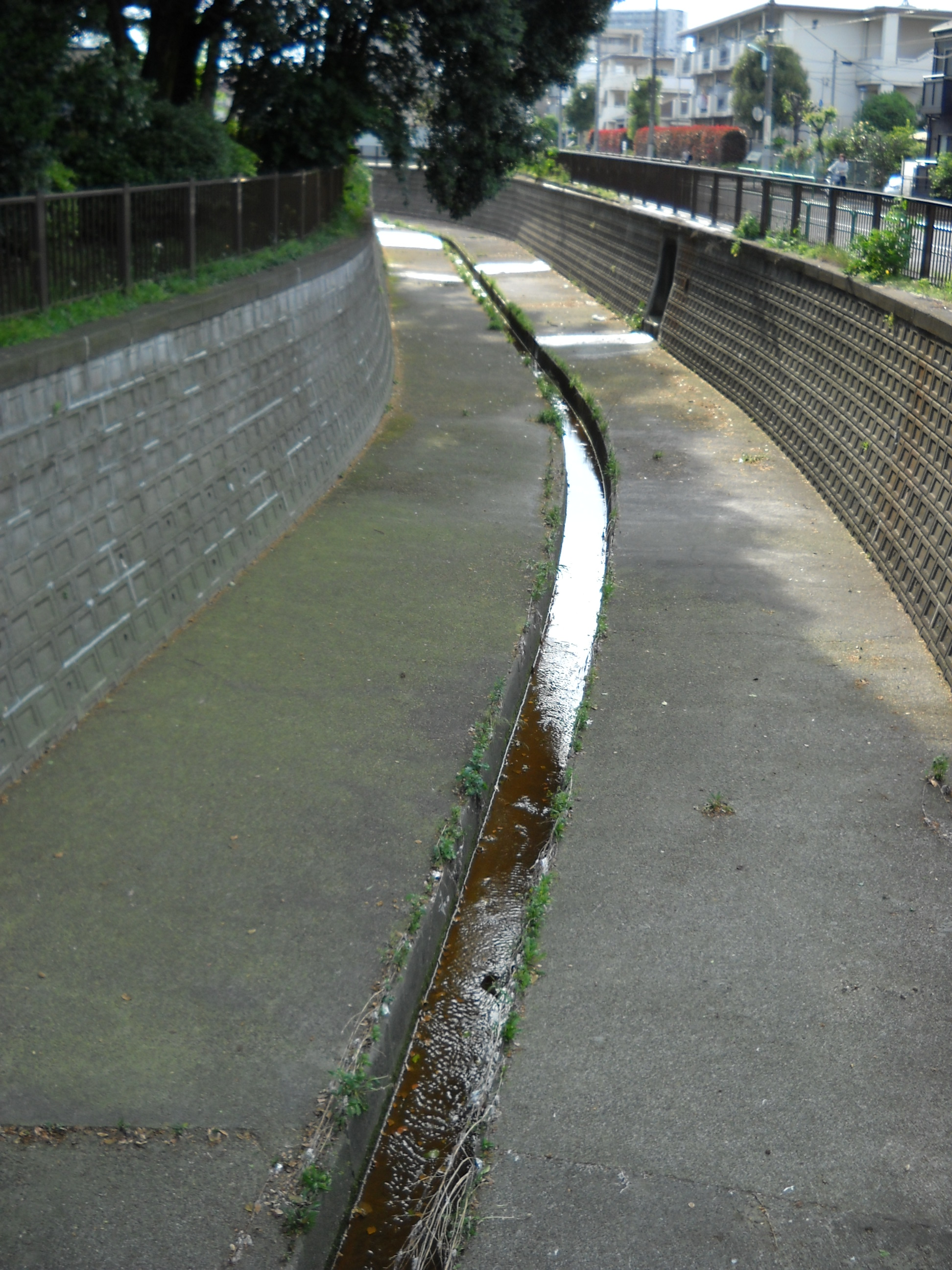
- Egota River in Egota-no-Mori Park, Nakano, Tokyo, Japan

- Location within Japan

Location
- Country: Japan
- Region: Kantō
- District: Nerima Ward, Nakano Ward

Physical characteristics
- Mouth
  - coordinates: 35°43′26″N 139°40′13″E

The Egota River (江古田川, Egota-gawa) is designated as a Class A river by the Japanese government with a length of 1.64 km and a basin area of 5.0 km². It used to flow through Naka-arai Village (中新井村, Naka-arai-mura) and so it also used to be called the Naka-arai River (中新井川, Naka-arai-gawa). The open-ditch section of the river is under 2 km in length.

== Course ==
It starts in Nerima Ward, and ends by flowing into the Myōshōji River in Nakano Ward.

== History ==
The region around the river used to be swampy.
