= Nashimoto =

Nashimoto may refer to:

- Nashimoto-no-miya, a branch of the Japanese imperial family

== People with the surname ==
- Prince Nashimoto Morimasa (梨本宮守正王, 1874–1951), a member of the Japanese imperial family
- Masaru Nashimoto (梨元 勝, 1944–2010), Japanese show business reporter
