= Murder of Jiang Ge =

Murder case in Japan involving Chinese nationals

- Jiang Ge, the victim
- Location: Nakano, Tokyo, Japan
- Date: 3 November 2016
- Attack type: Murder by stabbing
- Victim: Jiang Ge (江歌)
- Perpetrator: Chen Shifeng (陈世峰)
- Verdict: 20 years in prison
- Convictions: Murder

The murder of Jiang Ge occurred in Nakano, Tokyo, Japan, on 3 November 2016. Jiang Ge, a 24-year-old graduate student from China at Hosei University, was stabbed to death by Chen Shifeng, a 25-year-old Chinese national, just outside her apartment. The case was controversial in China after it was discovered that Jiang's roommate Liu Xin, who initially claimed that she did not know the identity of the murderer, was the murderer's ex-girlfriend. It later emerged that, before the murder, Liu asked Jiang to accompany her home as she was afraid of Chen. When Chen appeared, she entered the apartment before Jiang, locked the door behind her, and called the police. Liu was heavily criticised in the Chinese media for failing to assist Jiang.

== People involved ==
Jiang Ge (Chinese: 江歌; pinyin: Jiāng Gē) (1992 – 3 November 2016) was from the city of Jimo (present-day Jimo District in the city of Qingdao), Shandong Province, in eastern China. She was raised by her mother Jiang Qiulian (Chinese: 江秋莲; pinyin: Jiāng Qiūlián), who had divorced Ge's father when she was one year old. After the completion of her college entrance examination, she moved to Weihai to study in a junior college and later took Self-Taught Higher Education Examinations in Qufu to study for her undergraduate degree. In April 2015 she started studying abroad at a Japanese language school, and in April 2016 she was admitted to the first-year postgraduate degree program at Hosei University in Tokyo.

Liu Xin (Chinese: 刘鑫; pinyin: Liú Xīn) (born 1992) is from Chengyang District in the city of Qingdao. In the summer of 2010 she began her major in Japanese at Taishan University in Qingdao, and in 2014 she came to Japan for postgraduate education. In April 2015, she enrolled as a graduate student at Daito Bunka University in Tokyo. Liu moved to Jiang's apartment in September 2016.

Chen Shifeng (Chinese: 陈世峰; pinyin: Chén Shìfēng) (born 1991) is from Yanchi County in the city of Wuzhong, Ningxia Hui Autonomous Region, in western China. After graduating from a middle school in Dingbian County in the city of Yulin, Shaanxi Province in 2004, he entered Huaqiao University in 2009 and graduated in 2013. Following graduation, he worked at a Confucius Institute in Kasetsart University in Bangkok, Thailand, where he taught calligraphy. In 2015 he moved to Japan where he attended a language school in Fukuoka, and in 2016 he entered the graduate school of Chinese studies at Daito Bunka University. Before the incident he lived in Itabashi Ward of Tokyo.

== Murder ==
On November 2, 2016, at around 3:00 PM, Chen Shifeng went to the apartment shared by Liu Xin and Jiang Ge, where he harassed Liu in person. Liu sought help from Jiang, who had already left the apartment. Jiang suggested calling the police, but Liu cited that sharing the apartment was against local laws and she did not want to escalate the situation. Instead, Liu asked Jiang to return and help resolve the issue. Jiang came back and managed to persuade Chen to leave.

Afterward, Jiang returned to school, while Chen continued to follow Liu and sent her threatening messages. To fend off his harassment, Liu asked a colleague to pretend to be her boyfriend. Chen left angrily and sent her a message. Throughout this time, Liu did not inform Jiang about Chen's harassment and threats. Around 11:00 PM, feeling scared, Liu asked Jiang via WeChat to wait for her at the Higashi-Nakano Station so they could return to the apartment together. Jiang waited near the station and spoke with her mother, Jiang Qiulian, via WeChat voice call until Liu arrived.

Shortly after midnight on November 3, Jiang and Liu met and walked back to the apartment together. As they entered the second-floor hallway, Chen, who had been lying in wait upstairs, rushed down to the second floor with a knife. He confronted Jiang, who was walking behind Liu, and a dispute ensued. Liu, walking ahead, opened the apartment door, entered, and locked it.

Outside the apartment, Chen stabbed Jiang in the neck more than ten times with the knife and then fled the scene. Liu called the police twice from inside the apartment. Jiang, suffering from severe blood loss due to a left common carotid artery injury, died despite attempts to save her.

== Trial and aftermath ==
Initially after the incident, Liu Xin claimed not to know and not to have any clues about who the perpetrator was, until four days later, on 7 November 2016, when the Tokyo Metropolitan Police arrested Chen on suspicion of intimidation after discovering he had sent a threatening email to Liu on the day of the murder. During the subsequent investigation, the police found evidence of his involvement in the crime and issued an arrest warrant for him on the suspicion of murder. On 14 December, the prosecution formally charged Chen with intimidation and murder, and the case was later scheduled for trial in December 2017.

On 14 August 2017, Jiang Ge's mother Jiang Qiulian posted an article on Chinese social media platforms and collected signatures for her petition from the public through online and postal means, urging the Japanese judicial authorities to sentence Chen Shifeng to death. In November of the same year, just before the trial began, she traveled to Tokyo and conducted a multi-day signature collection campaign at Ikebukuro Station's west exit park and reportedly collected over two million signatures before the trial proceedings began. However, some legal professionals, including Jiang's then-legal representative, believed that the impact of this petition campaign might be limited and it would be unlikely that Chen would be sentenced to death.

On 11 December, the trial of Chen Shifeng began at Tokyo District Court, and both the prosecution and defense presented their opening statements, followed by the introduction of prosecution evidence and forensic testimony from prosecution witnesses. The trial lasted till 20 December, involved the testimonies of Jiang Qiulian and Liu Xin. Chen was sentenced to 20 years in prison for the murder. On 22 December, he appealed against the first-instance judgment after the verdict was announced, but the appeal was withdrawn on 29 December and the original judgment officially came into effect.

=== Public opinion of the case in China ===
External videos
- First meeting between Jiang Qiulian and Liu Xin with subtitles (23 August 2017) (Full Edition), YouTube

On 5 November 2016, two days after the murder, Jiang Qiulian posted on Chinese social media platform Sina Weibo, stating that the culprit who killed Jiang Ge was Chen Shifeng and he was Liu Xin's former boyfriend. This news attracted the attention of Chinese netizens and resulted in public debate regarding Liu's actions during Jiang's murder, with netizens accusing her of hiding in the room and not trying to save Jiang Ge who died while trying to protect her. Liu Xin believed that Jiang Qiulian's Weibo post led to online harassment and defamation from netizens. In private communications, Liu informed Jiang that she would cease contact with her after the case was resolved. Subsequently, Liu ignored the WeChat messages sent by Jiang and failed to attend Jiang Ge's funeral as agreed upon. She also did not meet with Jiang Qiulian when she traveled to Japan.

On 21 May 2017, since she was unable to meet with Liu for 200 days since the murder of her daughter, Jiang shared a post on Weibo blaming Liu for locking the door of the apartment during Jiang Ge's murder and publicly disclosed personal information of Liu including her photos, parents' names, phone number and identification card number in the post, in an attempt to pressure Liu into coming forward. The Weibo post resulted in a large number of shares and comments. In the days after posting on Weibo, Liu and her parents contacted Jiang, accusing her of invading their privacy and requesting that she delete the post. However, Jiang refused to comply with Liu's request and in early June of the same year, Sina deleted articles containing Liu's personal information due to privacy concerns. In response, Jiang printed more than a thousand flyers with the information from the articles and posted them across Liu's hometown in Qingdao.

In August 2017, both Jiang and Liu separately gave interviews to digital newspaper The Paper and an interview program hosted by The Beijing News. Through coordination by the two media outlets, Liu met with Jiang for the first time on 23 August. She expressed remorse for avoiding Jiang but the two still could not reach a resolution.

In the aftermath of Jiang Ge's murder, Liu faced significant criticism and condemnation from the Chinese public. The initial doubts about Liu originated from Jiang Qiulian's revelation in November 2016 about Liu's previous romantic relationship with Chen Shifeng. In May 2017, after Liu Xin and her family's personal information was made public, there was another wave of accusations and insults against her on the internet. In August 2017, Jiang's signature collection campaign brought the case back into the public spotlight, leading to further criticism and even causing Liu to be dismissed from the Japanese language school where she was teaching in Qingdao. In November, the interviews with Jiang and Liu by The Beijing News were published on the internet, generating a huge response in China and bringing certain doubts and details of the case back into the public eye. Some netizens believed that, although the online harassment against Liu Xin had reached the level of cyberbullying, given her actions in the case, it was a deserved punishment for her. However, some argued that until the facts are confirmed and responsibility is determined, the public's moral judgment of Liu lacks a factual basis and is unfair.

However, there are also voices that believe that before the truth is confirmed and responsibility is determined, public opinion's "moral trial" against Liu Xin is both unfounded and unfair. At the same time, some of Jiang Qiulian's actions have also aroused criticism and questioning from some netizens and the public. Some members of the public, represented by Chen Lan, accused Jiang Qiulian of raising huge amounts of charity and engaging in activities such as loan sharking, and asked Jiang Qiulian to disclose the whereabouts of the donations; some people even think that Jiang Qiulian is seeking benefits by hyping up Jiang Ge's case, but Jiang Qiulian denies these claims and believes that these voices are slanderous against her. Zhang Shi, deputy editor-in-chief of Japan's Chinese Herald and columnist for the Nikkei Chinese website, pointed out that compared with the extensive and high attention of the Chinese media, the Japanese media has very limited coverage of the case. He believed that this case was just an ordinary murder case involving an emotional dispute and had little impact on Japanese society. The Chinese public derives pleasure from the "moral trial" of Liu Xin, but the Japanese believe that Liu Xin not only has no legal responsibility, but is also one of the victims and should be protected rather than have her information exposed.

=== Subsequent trial of Liu Xin ===
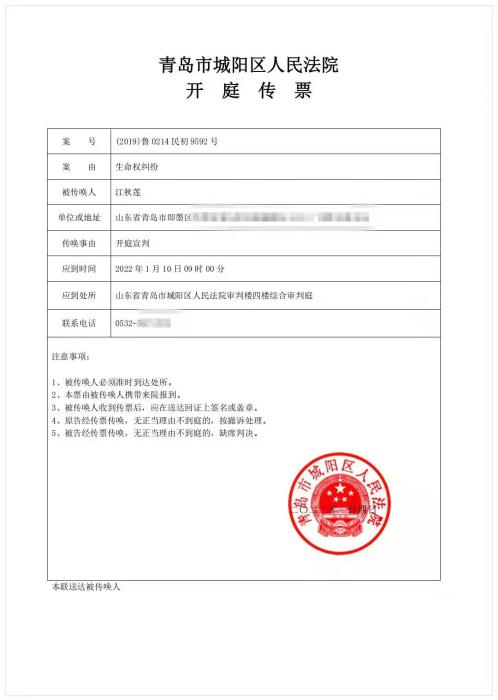
Announcement of the verdict issuing date on Jiang Ge's case by the People's Intermediate Court in Qingdao

On the day Chen Shifeng was sentenced to prison by the court, Jiang Qiulian held a press conference and expressed that she could not accept the verdict that Chen was not sentenced to death. She also announced that she would file a lawsuit against Liu Xin after returning to China to investigate her responsibility in Jiang Ge's murder.

On the evening of 15 October 2018, Jiang posted on Weibo to announce a lawsuit against Liu Xin. The case was successfully filed on 28 October 2019. During this period, she traveled between China and Japan to obtain evidence regarding the case. On 22 December 2019, Weibo banned Liu Xin's account on the grounds that she had consumed money earned through donations from her followers and had attacked Jiang Ge's family.

On 5 June 2020, a pre-trial meeting was held at the People's Court of Chengyang District in Qingdao. On 15 April 2021, the case was heard in court. After a four-hour trial, the presiding judge announced an adjournment and would not pronounce the verdict in court that day, but at a later date. The case was originally scheduled to be pronounced on the morning of 31 December, but due to sudden illness of the presiding judge on the day earlier, the verdict was temporarily canceled.

On 19 January 2022, the court issued a first-instance judgment stating that Liu was at fault due to her locking the door at the time of Jiang Ge's murder and that she should bear the corresponding civil liability. The court ordered that Liu should pay ¥496,000 to Jiang Qiulian for her financial losses and another ¥200,000 for the mental anguish Jiang suffered over the murder of her daughter. The court's ruling further stated that "Jiang [Ge]’s selflessness toward others reflects Chinese traditional virtues and is in line with socialism’s core values, public order, and good morals, which should be praised … while Liu’s behavior goes against humanity and should be condemned.”

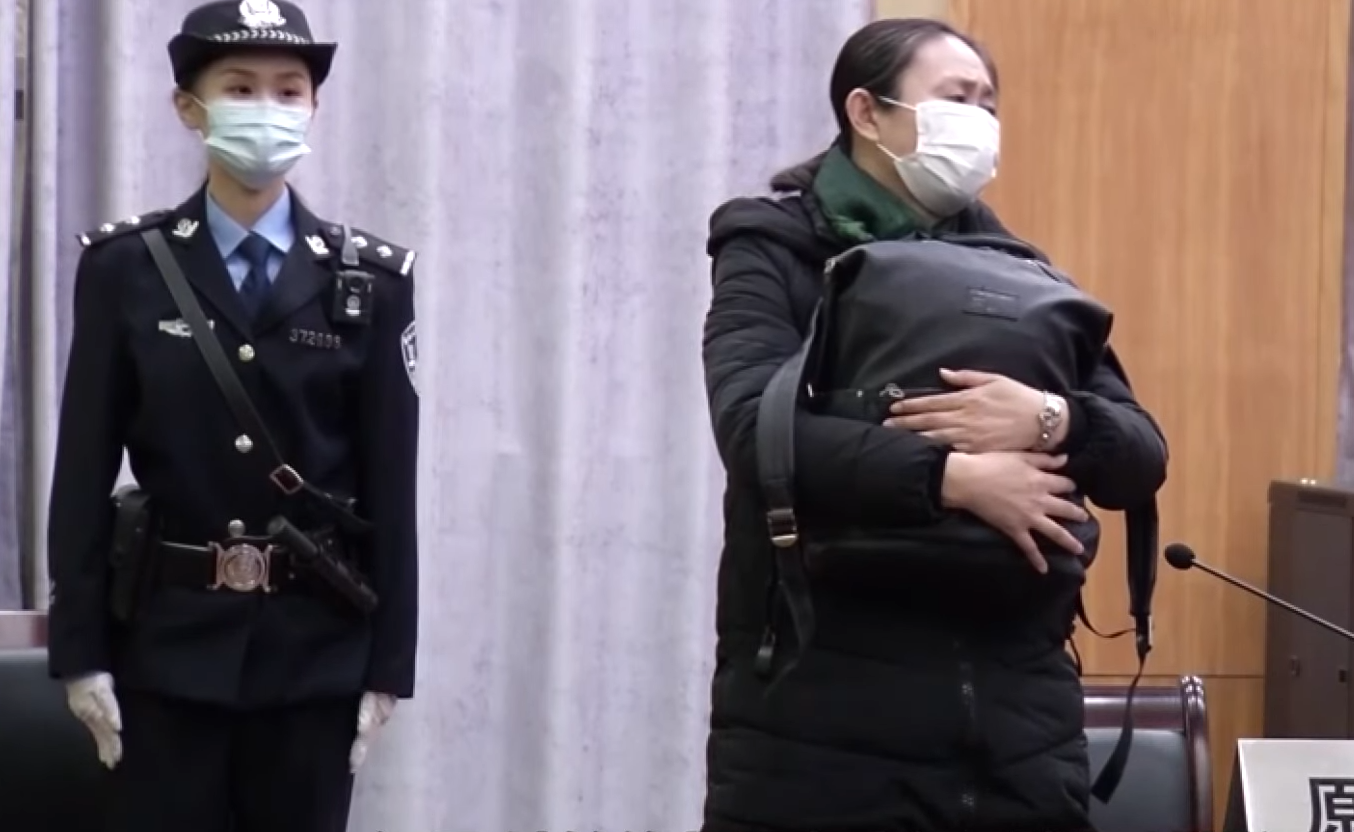
Jiang Qiulian at the court during the announcement of the verdict on Jiang Ge's case (2022)

On 24 January, Liu stated through her attorney that she had appealed against the ruling, and believed that the first-instance judgment found insufficient factual evidence and applied the law incorrectly, and requested the second-instance court to remand the case for retrial or change the judgment to reject all the appellee's claims in accordance with the law.

On 16 February, the hearing of Liu's appeal was held at Qingdao Intermediate People's Court. The trial lasted for four hours and the presiding judge adjourned the trial and announced the verdict at a later date. On 30 December, the court made a second-instance judgment where it rejected Liu's appeal and upheld the original judgment demanding that she pay the compensation to Jiang.

After the verdict was announced, Liu published a donation link on her personal Weibo account in an attempt to crowdfund nearly ¥700,000 in compensation. Her actions resulted in outrage from the public, including from Jiang Qiulian, and was found to be in violation of the charity law of China, which only allows registered charity organisations to host online fundraisers. As a result, her Weibo account was permanently closed on 4 January 2023.

On 1 June 2023, Jiang Qiulian issued an article stating that the total compensation of ¥696,000 had been paid by Liu after the court enforced the ruling four times. She also stated that she would contact relevant organizations to donate the compensation.

On 13 June, Jiang issued a statement on Weibo saying that she had received a notice of response from the Shandong Provincial Higher People's Court. The notice stated that Liu Xin was dissatisfied with the second-instance judgment made by the Qingdao Intermediate People's Court on 30 December 2022 and as a result, she had applied for retrial to the Provincial Higher People's Court. The court has opened the case for review. On 2 February 2024, in accordance with the relevant provisions of the Supreme People's Court's interpretation of the application of the Civil Procedure Law, the court ruled to reject Liu's application for a retrial.

== Television coverage ==
In September 2022, Chinese legal drama television series Draw the Line (Chinese: 底線; pinyin: Dǐ Xiàn) reenacted the murder case with fictional character names in the fourteenth episode of the series.
