= Hideo Kachi =

Japanese musician (born 1953)

Kachi Hideo 可知 日出男
- Birth name: Kachi Hidenori
- Also known as: Jack Hideo
- Born: December 17, 1953 (age 71); Nakano, Japan
- Genres: Classical; Jazz; Pop; Contemporary folk
- Instruments: Voice, flute, clarinet, saxophone, bassoon, ocarina, recorder, etc
- Years active: 1990-present
- Website: http://www.aegk.club/

Hideo Kachi (可知 日出男) (born December 17, 1953, in Nakano, Tokyo) is a Japanese musician. He is a player of various woodwind instruments, such as the flute, clarinet, saxophone, bassoon, ocarina, recorder (musical instrument), and others. He is also a singer, and has written his own lyrics. He graduated from Waseda University in the first department of literature. His musical origins came from his participation in the band Geinoh Yamashirogumi, followed by his leadership of "Art Ensemble Green." He has participated in fourteen recitals so far.

== Career ==
He apprenticed himself to Tadashi Yamamoto, Masahito Tanaka, Milan Turković (bassoon), and Tamami Koyake (jazz flute). He also sought the guidance of Shigeo Maruyama, Eri Oono (jazz vocal), and he also sought out Haruhiko Jō, a member of the theater troupe "za," due to his dramatizations and vocalizations.

Hideo played an active role in the musical activities celebrating the opening of the hall "Nakano ZERO." He was the core management of the musical performances, Beethoven's "Symphony No. 9" "Ward Residents: The Musical," and "Popular & Jazz," among others. Over the span of several years, he directed and supervised the "Tokyo Green Club Orchestra" which was performed by the musical orchestra "Murou Shun Company," of which the Shobi University teacher Shun Murou was the director.

Hideo and the Japanese folk singer (min'yō singer) Tatsuaki Sakakoshi wrote publications on bands and folk songs, as well as ethnic choruses. In recent years, he has supervised the "Shinjuku Minotaur Music festival" and has performed at Madarao JAZZ Festival. At the Kawasaki city Coming of Age Day ceremonies in 2002 and 2004, he performed the Japanese national anthem, "Kimi ga yo."

Hideo helps young singers and expressive people like actors and actresses develop their skills. As a voice and body trainer, he teaches exhaustive breathing, whole-body vocalization, standing with a natural posture, along with breath control, body control, and voice control. Upon meeting young dancers by chance in 2008, he reconsidered his musical performances, and pursued collaborations and blending styles at his concerts. Since January 2010, Hideo has run the "Nakano ZERO Underground Gallery Exhibit." It consists of photographs, paintings, videos, and musical performances. It was made as a place to meet others and collaborate.
