= Shin-egota Station =

Metro station in Tokyo, Japan

Coordinates: 35.7323°N 139.6708°E

Shin-egota Station 新江古田駅

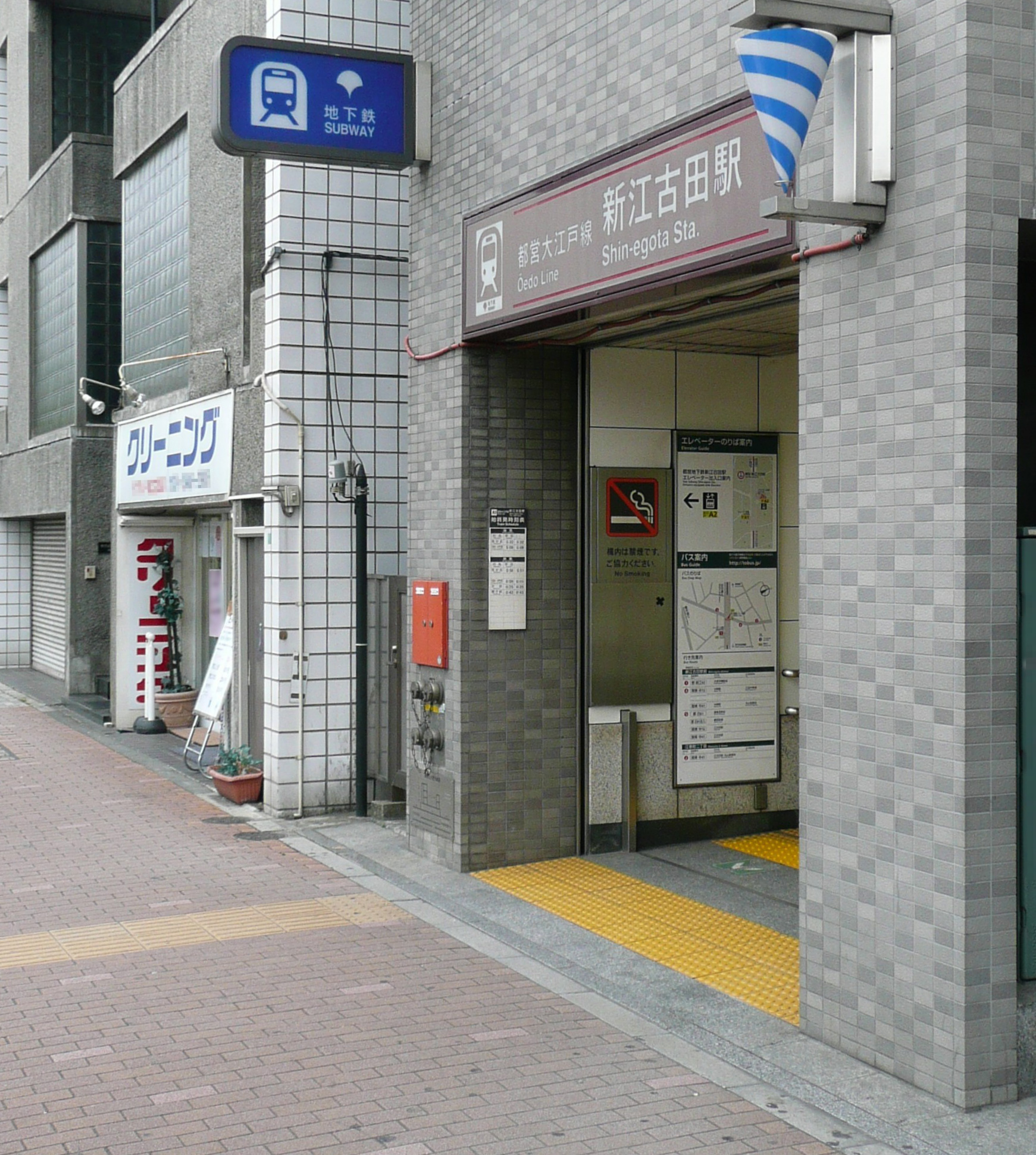
- Entrance A2 to Shin-egota Station in May 2010

General information
- Location: 2-29-13 Ehara-chō, Nakano City, Tokyo 165-0023; Japan
- Operator: Toei Subway
- Line: Ōedo Line
- Distance: 5.4 km (3.4 mi) from Hikarigaoka
- Platforms: 1 island platform
- Tracks: 2

Construction
- Structure type: Underground

Other information
- Station code: E-34
- Website: Official website

History
- Opened: 19 December 1997; 28 years ago

Passengers
- FY2011: 22,697 daily

Services
Preceding station	Toei Subway	Following station
Nerima towards Hikarigaoka	Ōedo Line	Ochiai-minami-nagasaki towards Tochōmae
Location
- Location within Tokyo wards area Location within Tokyo Location within Japan

Shin-egota Station (新江古田駅, Shin egota eki) is a subway station on the Toei Ōedo Line in Nakano, Tokyo, Japan, and it is operated by the Tokyo subway operator Tokyo Metropolitan Bureau of Transportation (Toei).

== Lines ==
Shin-egota Station is served by the Toei Ōedo Line, and lies 5.4 km (3.4 mi) from the starting point of the line at Hikarigaoka. The station is numbered "E-34".

== Station layout ==
The station has one island platform on the second basement ("B2F") level, serving two tracks.

=== Platforms ===
1	Ōedo Line	for Tochōmae, Roppongi, and Daimon
2	Ōedo Line	for Nerima and Hikarigaoka

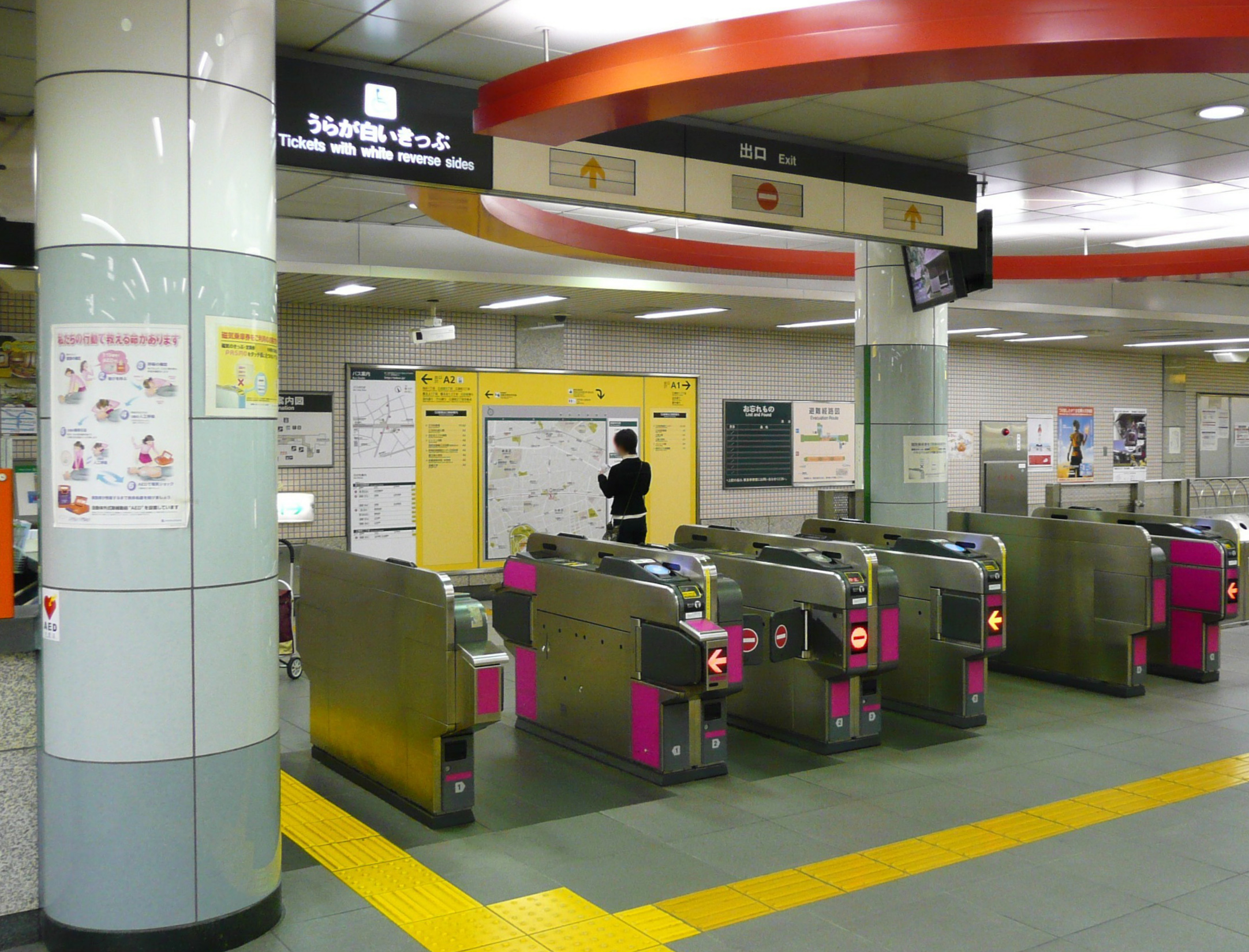
The ticket gates in May 2010

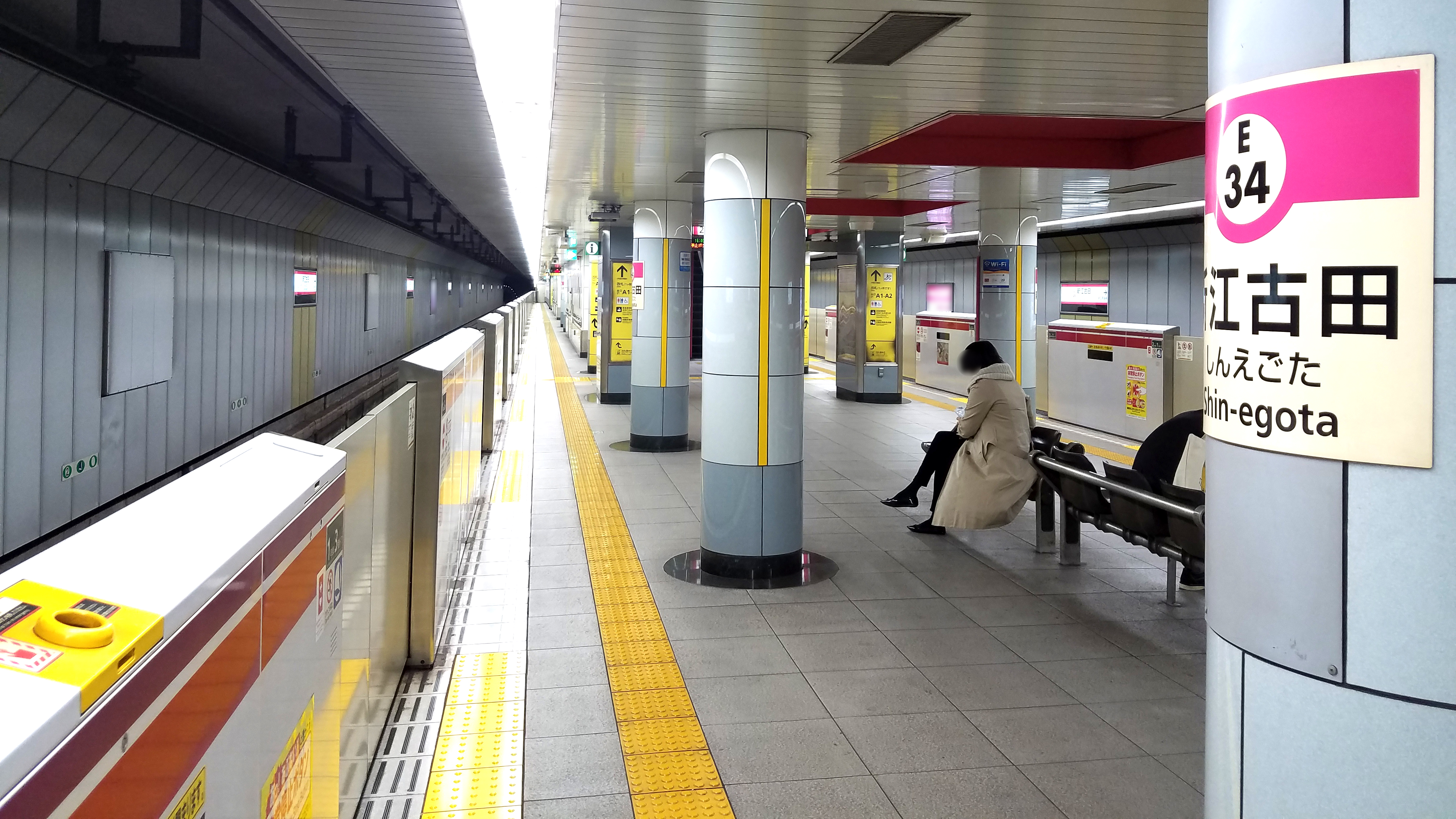
The platforms in December 2019

== History ==
The station opened on 19 December 1997.

== Passenger statistics ==
In fiscal 2011, the station was used by an average of 22,697 passengers daily.

== Surrounding area ==
- Egota-no-Mori Park
- Nihon University College of Art
- Musashi University
- Musashi Junior & Senior High School

== See also ==
- List of railway stations in Japan
