= Shoko Sawada =

Shoko Sawada 沢田 聖子
- Born: March 13, 1962 (age 64); Nakano, Tokyo, Japan
- Genres: Anison; Japanese pop
- Occupations: Musician; Record producer; Singer-songwriter
- Instruments: Guitar; Piano; Vocals
- Years active: 1979–present
- Labels: Universal Music (1979–1983); Nippon Crown (1983–1987); Toshiba EMI (1988–1992); King Records (1993–1996); SMC Records (2007–2008); SAINT Records (2010–present)
- Website: sawadashoko.boo.jp

Japanese name
- Kanji: 沢田 聖子
- Hiragana: さわだ しょうこ
- Katakana: サワダ ショコ
Transcriptions
- Romanization: Sawada Shōko

Shoko Sawada (沢田 聖子, Sawada Shōko; born March 13, 1962) is a Japanese singer-songwriter, reporter, and radio personality. Since the start of her professional singing career in 1980, Sawada has recorded over 27 studio albums.

== Life and career ==
At the age of five, Sawada became a member of the Otowa Basket Lily Association and started singing nursery rhymes and appeared as a child actor. She appeared in a TV commercial for "Panshiron" sponsored by Rohto Pharmaceutical Co. in 1968, alongside Kiyoshi Atsumi.

On May 25, 1979, Sawada released "Campus Sketch", her recording debut with Crown Record. At that time, young female singer-songwriters were rare in Japan, but she benefited from her Japanese idol good looks and attracted a male audience. Many of the songs she performed were not written by Sawada. She also struggled to make love songs.

Sawada also gained popularity via NHK-FM's radio program "Requests". In October 1989, she hosted the KBS Kyoto radio program "Hyper Night" every Thursday. Guests on the program included Tarako and Airi Hiramatsu. She also wrote and composed the song "Shin'ai naru Hitoe" (lit. "To the Dear Person") in memory of Kōzō Murashita who died in 1999.

Sawada released album History 2 on October 21, 2004, to commemorate her 25th anniversary as a recording artist. She has performed in the "Furano Chapel Concert" at Shin-Furano Prince Hotel for a few days every winter. She has been in the group "The 4/9" with Reiko Sada, the sister of Masashi Sada, since 2005.

Sawada is a radio personality on Yamanashi Broadcasting System's "Jamboree Saturday of Sawada Seiko". She has also hosted "Paradise afternoon – Subete ni Arigato" every Monday at the Japanese FM's community radio Music Bird.

== Discography ==
=== Singles ===
- "Sketch Campus" c/w "Ame yo Nagashite" (May 1979)
- "Sion" c/w "Machikado no Post" (October 1979)
- Sakamichi no Shoujo c/w "Suteki na Asa" (April 1980)
- "Hoshizora no Message" c/w "Tsukimi Gusa" (September 1980)
- "Haru" c/w "Ochiba no Heya" (March 1981)
- "Ame no Hi no Sunshine" c/w "Toui Machi ni Akogarete" (May 1981)
- "Sotsugyo" c/w "Namida wa Tsubasa ni" (January 1982)
- "Anata e no Birthday Card" c/w "Hitoribocchi no Hirusagari" (May 1982)
- "Dollhouse" c/w "Shocking Shoko 9" (March 1983)
- "Kisetsu" c/w "Hitoribocchi no Catastrophe" (November 1983)
- "Tokaijin" c/w "Omoi Chigai" (April 1984)
- "Anata kara" c/w "Iroaseta Umi" (December 1984)
- "Kazeiro no Chance" c/w "Non Stop Elevator" (December 1985)
- "Natural" c/w "Goodbye Loneliness/Pony Tail"( April 1986)
- "Tsumetai Kotoba de Kizutsukete" c/w "Tasogare no Machi" (September 1986)
- "Life" c/w "A day" (May 1988)
- "Ai o Kudasai" c/w "Shiroi Machi" (June 1990)
- "Norikoete Ikerune" c/w "Yoake" (September 1991)
- "Mirai no Kodomotachi no Tameni" c/w "Life" (March 1992)
- "Subete wa Kimidake no Tameni" c/w "Anata kara F.O." (October 1993)
- "Kimi Iro Omoi (TV Size Ver.) (Akazukin Chacha) opening theme}"
- "Egao ga Sukidakara (Akazukin Chacha ending theme)" c/w Yume o Wasurenai (February 1994)
- "Yasashii Kaze" c/w "Hontoni Sayonara" (June 1994)
- "Kaze ni Naritai" c/w "Setsunasa o Dakishimete" (April 1995)
- "Aozora" c/w "Juuen Dama Mitsuketa" (November 1996)
- "Smile" c/w "Tsuyoku! Akaruku! Maemukini!!" (May 1997)
- "Respect" c/w "Donna Tokidemo Anata o Omotteru" (January 1998)
- "Present" c/w "Inori" (June 1998)
- "Kaze o Kanjite" c/w "Ganbare!" (May 1999)
- "Isshoni Kuraso!" c/w "Futari no Ashita" (November 2000)
- "Kyuuyuu Saikai" c/w "Mimosa no Shita de" (June 2001) (with Iruka, Panda Yamada, Seiko Sawada, Midori Utsumi)
- "Daisukina Machi" c/w "Furano" (July 2002)
- "Nankurunaisa" (February 2003)
- "Ame Nochi Hare" (May 2004)
- "Sorenari ni" (September 2006)
- "Michi" ( April 2008)

=== Albums ===
- Sakamichi no Shoujo (1980)
- Seishun no Hikari to Kage (1981)
- Shoko Live (1981)
- Sotsugyou (1982)
- Shoujoki (1982)
- Nagareru Kisetsu no Nakade (1983)
- Turning Point (1983)
- Kaze no Yokan (1984)
- Anjenu (1984)
- Potential (1985)
- Yume no Katachi (1985)
- Too Too (1986)
- Innovation (1987)
- Life (1988)
- Souvenir (1989)
- See You Again (1990)
- Acoustic Summer (1991)
- 15th Anniversary Shoko Sawada Story (1992)
- Umi Kara no Okurimono: Le Dauphin (1993)
- Anniversary – In My Heart Concert (1994)
- Folk Songs (1995)
- Acoustic Love Ballads (1997)
- 20th Anniversary Shoko Sawada STORY II (2000)
- Inori (2001)
- Kokoro wa Genki desuka (2003)
- 25th Anniversary Shoko Sawada STORY III (2005)
- Subete ni Arigatou (2007)

=== Compilations ===
- Best Selection 1979–1983 (1984)
- For You (1985.08.21)
- 17 Songs Sawada Masako Part I, II (1987)
- History (1998)
- Sawada Seiko Artist Series Collection (1999)
- History 2 (2004)
