= Kokusai Junior College =

Private College

Coordinates: 35°43′31.1″N 139°39′47.3″E

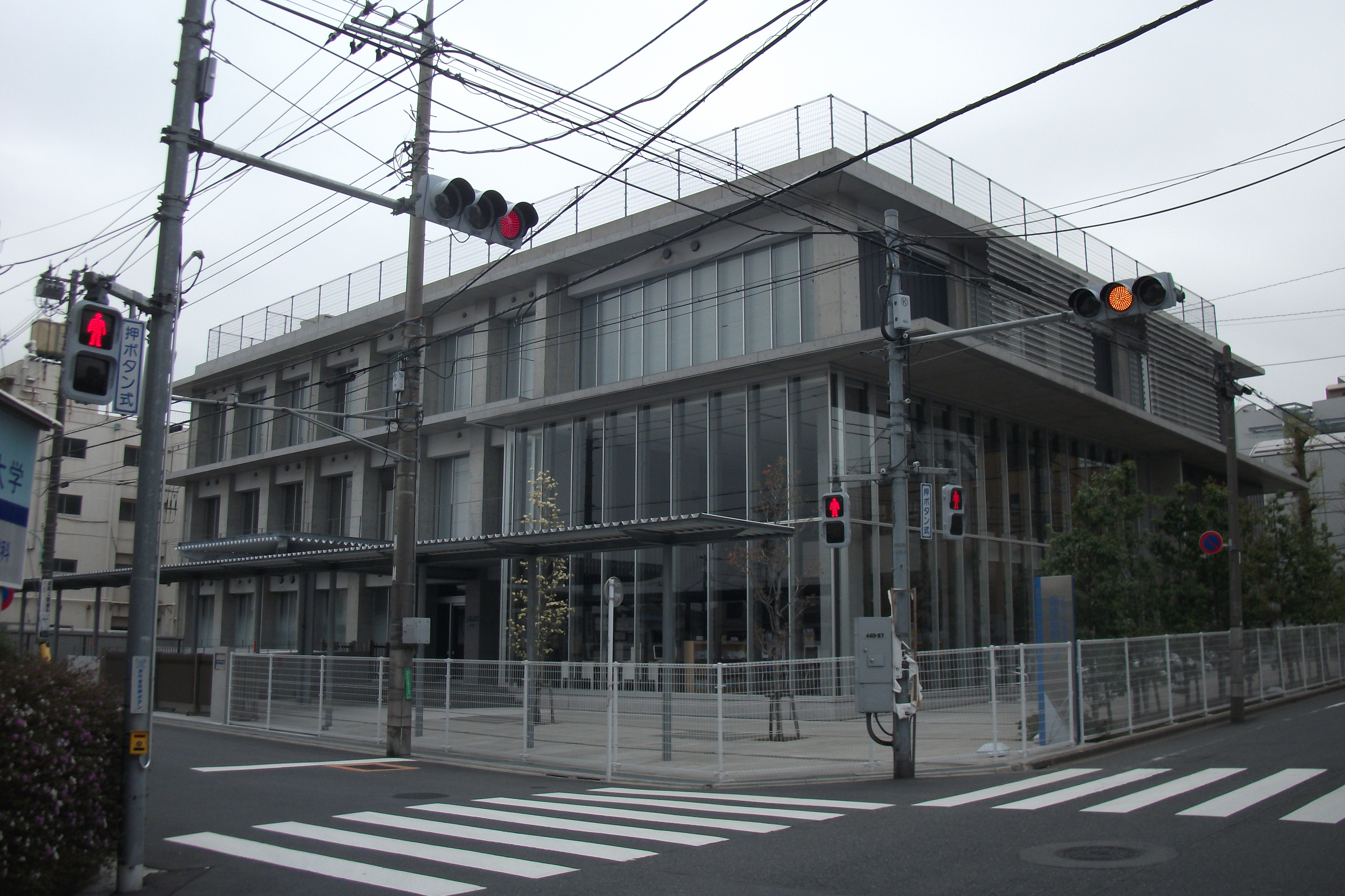

Kokusai Junior College (国際短期大学, Kokusai tanki daigaku) is a private junior college in Nakano, Tokyo, Japan. The precursor of the school was founded in 1933, and it was chartered as a university in 1950.
