= Tokyo Metropolitan Road Route 420 =

Road in Tokyo and Saitama Prefecture, Japan

Tokyo Metropolitan Road Route 420 東京都道420号鮫洲大山線

Route information
- Length: 22.859 km (14.204 mi)

Major junctions
- From: Higashi-Shinagawa, Shinagawa
- To: Hikawachō, Itabashi

Location
- Country: Japan

Highway system
- National highways of Japan; Expressways of Japan

Tokyo Metropolitan Road Route 420 (東京都道420号鮫洲大山線, Tōkyōto michi 420-gō Samezu Ōyama-sen) is a metropolitan road that connects the Yashiobashi intersection in Shinagawa, Tokyo and the Nakajuku intersection in Itabashi. It passes between Route 317 (Yamate-dori) and Route 318 (Kannana-dori), and play a role in connecting them. It is sometimes referred to as the "Ring Road 6.5".

== In popular culture ==
Tokyo Metropolitan Road Route 420 was featured on an episode of Tamori Club, which introduced this road under construction on July 13, 2013 as "(commonly known as) Ring Road 6.5".
