= Tetsugaku-dō Park =

Public park in Tokyo, Japan

Coordinates: 35.722242°N 139.674026°E

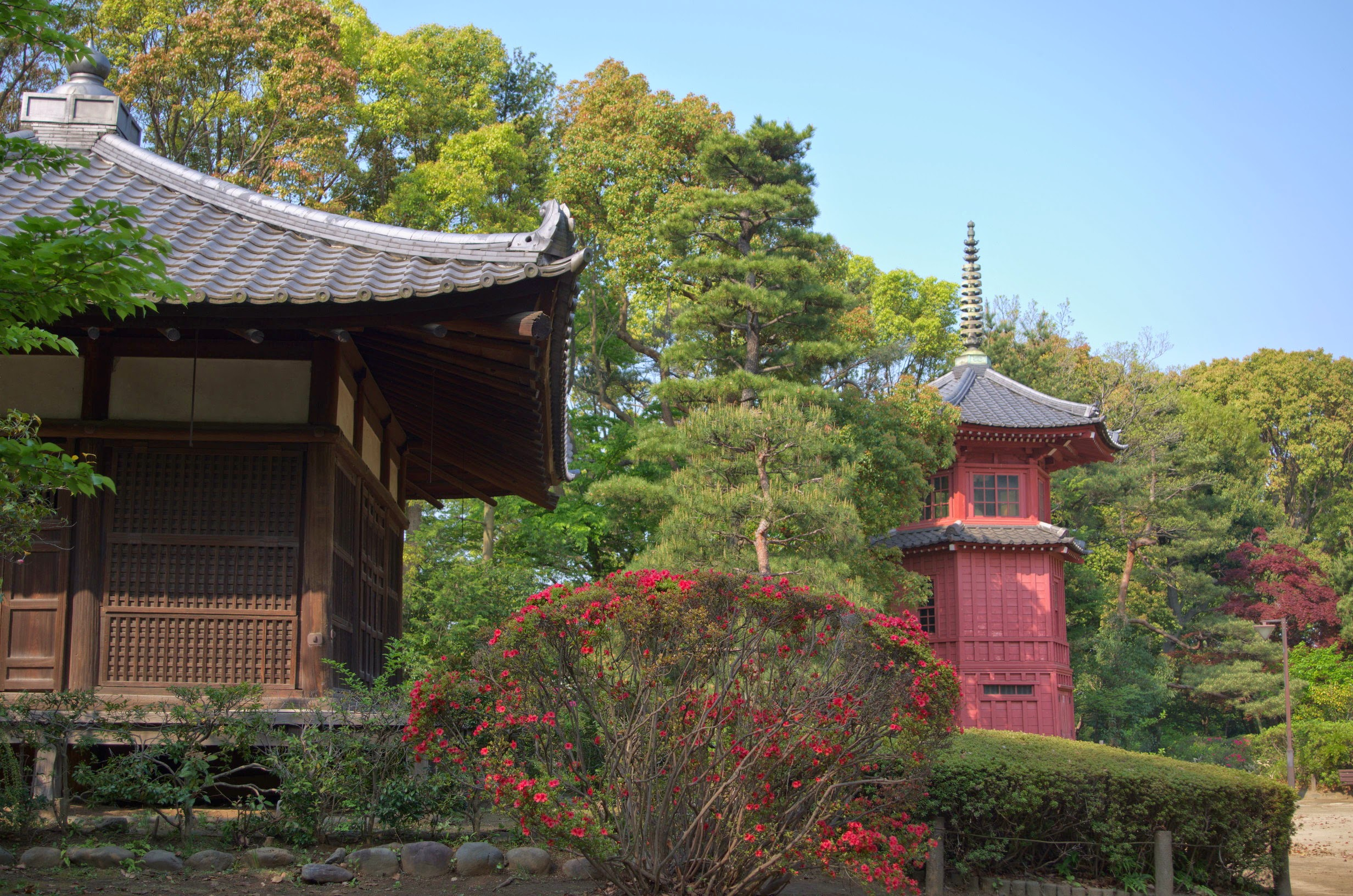
- Shiseidō and Rokkendai
- Interactive map of Tetsugaku-dō Park
- Location: Nakano Ward and Shinjuku Ward, Japan
- Area: 52,494 square metres (12.972 acres)
- Created: 1904
- Public transit: Ochiai-minami-nagasaki Station

Tetsugaku-dō Park (哲学堂公園, Tetsugaku-dō Kōen) ("Park of the Philosophy Shrine" or "Temple Garden of Philosophy") is a public park in Tokyo, Japan. Most of the park is in Nakano Ward, while approximately 7% (at the south-eastern edge) is in Shinjuku Ward. It was created successively during the years 1904 to 1919 by the philosopher and founder of Toyo University, Inoue Enryō. Inoue thought of this philosophical theme park as a place for mental cultivation. In 2020, the park was designated a National Site of Scenic Beauty.

== Outline ==
The main characteristics of the park are 77 garden features named according to philosophical concepts and the commemoration of various sages and philosophers of the Eastern and the Western philosophical traditions.

== Philosophers and sages ==
- The Four Sages of World Philosophy: Buddha, Confucius, Socrates, Kant
- The Six Wise Men of the East: Shōtoku Taishi, Sugawara no Michizane, Zhuāngzǐ, Zhū Xī, Nāgārjuna, Kapila
- The Three Founders of Philosophy: The Yellow Emperor, Akṣapāda, Thales
- The Three Japanese Erudites: Hirata Atsutane, Hayashi Razan, Gyōnen

== Facilities ==
Tetsugaku-dō Park has a play area for children, toilets, a Japanese garden and a plum garden.

== Gallery ==
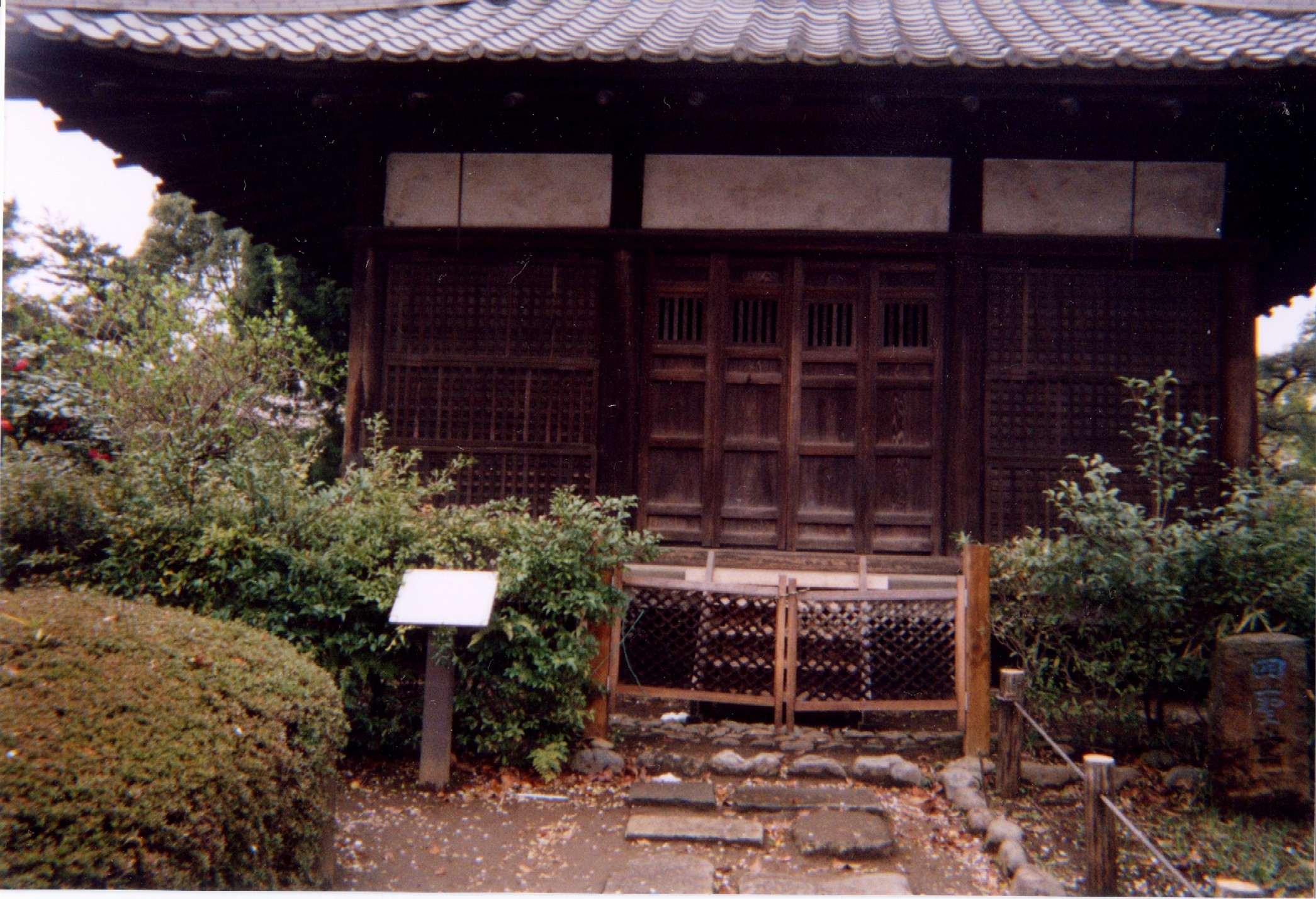
Shrine of the Four Sages (Shiseidō)

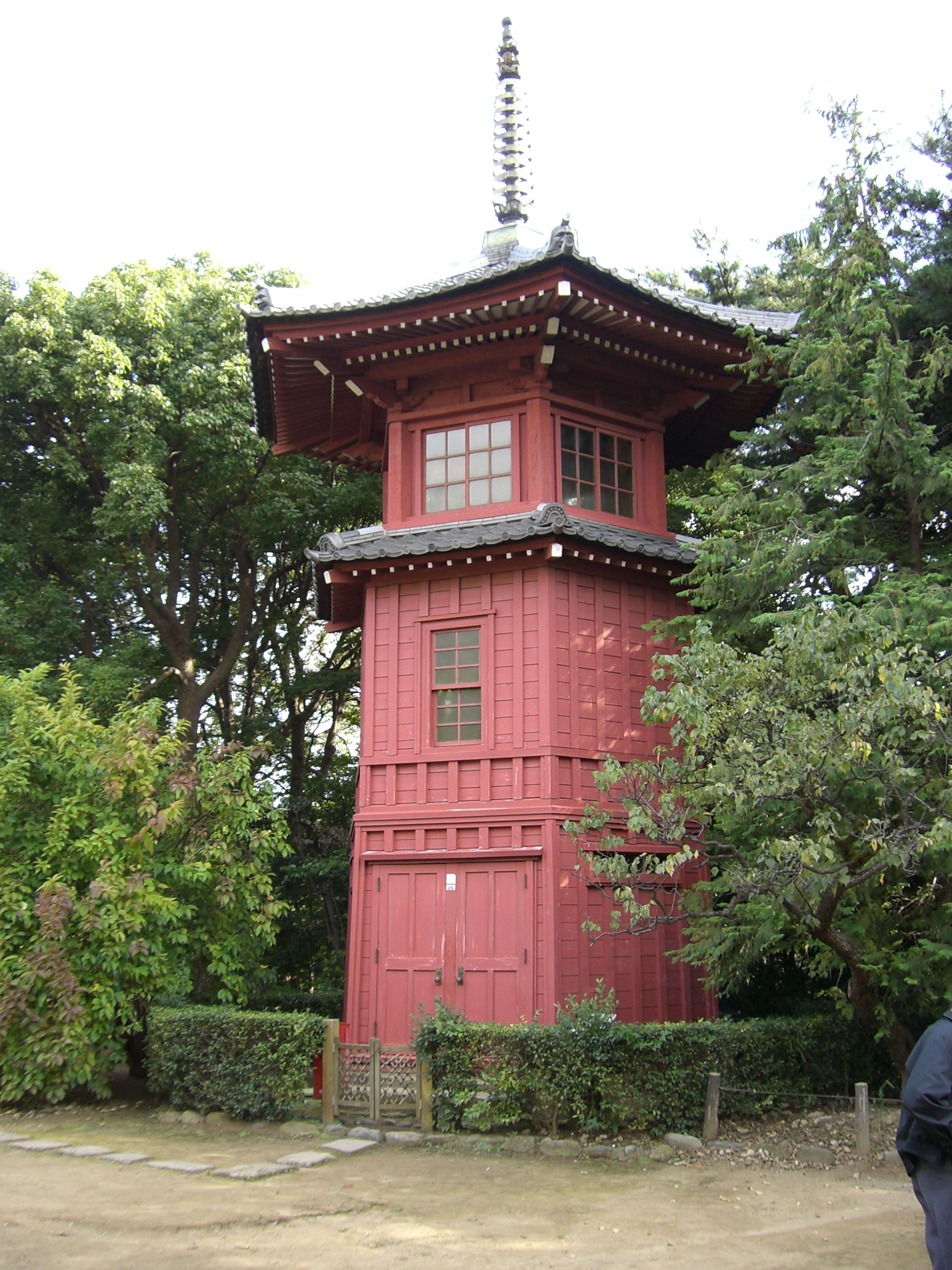
Pagoda of the Six Wise Men (Rokkendai)

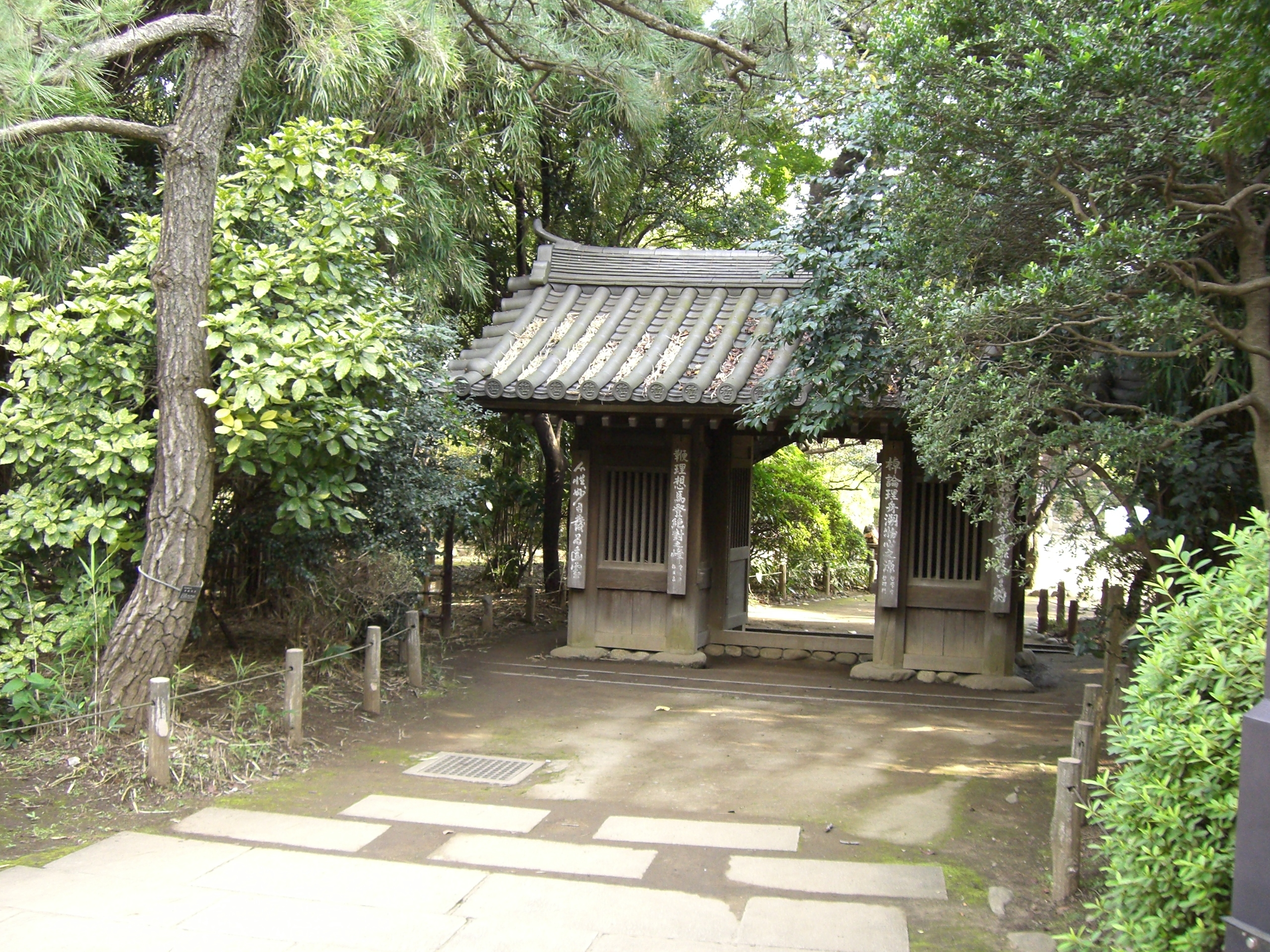
Portal of Metaphysics (Tetsurimon)

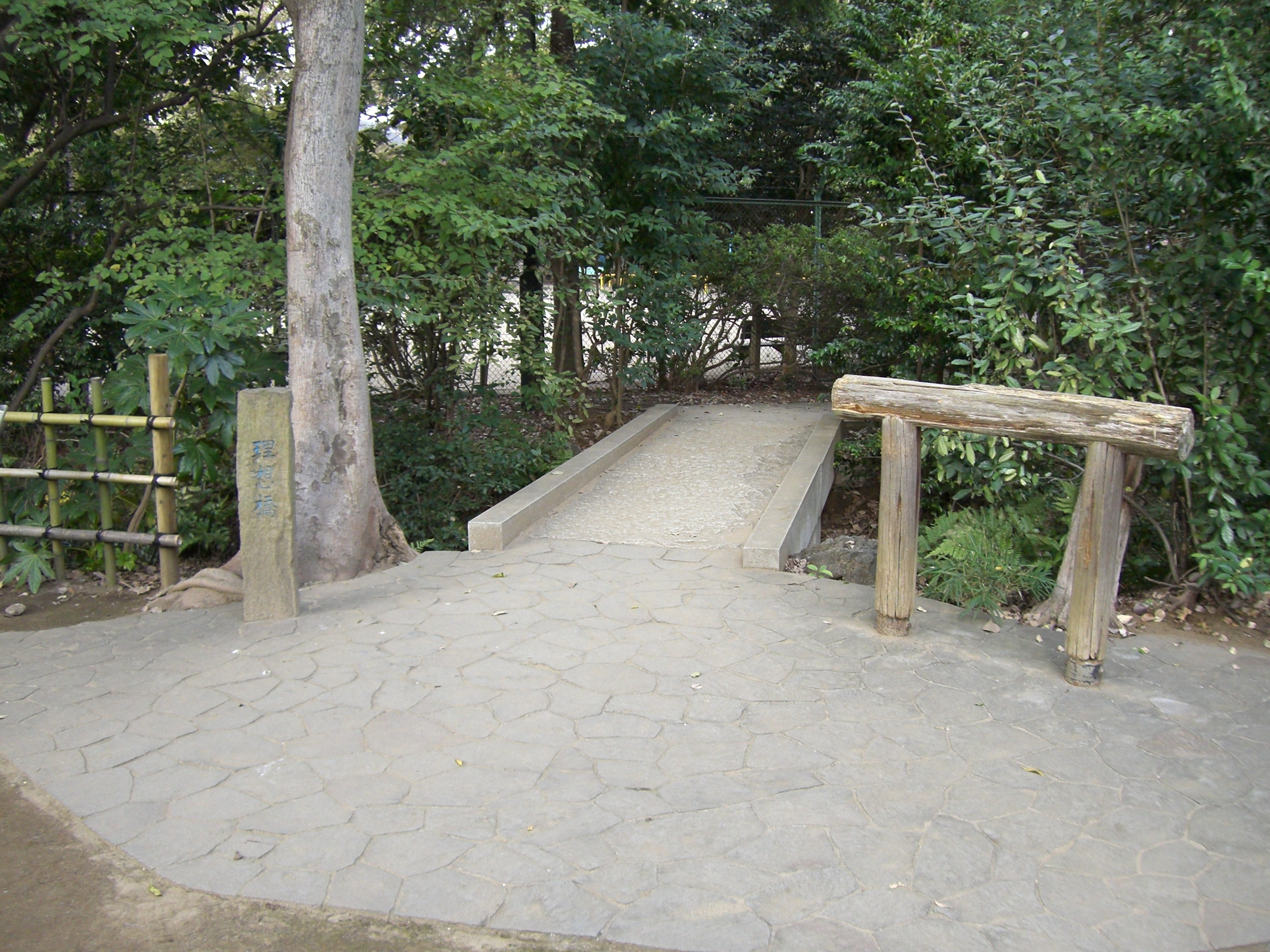
Bridge of the Ideal (Risōkyō)

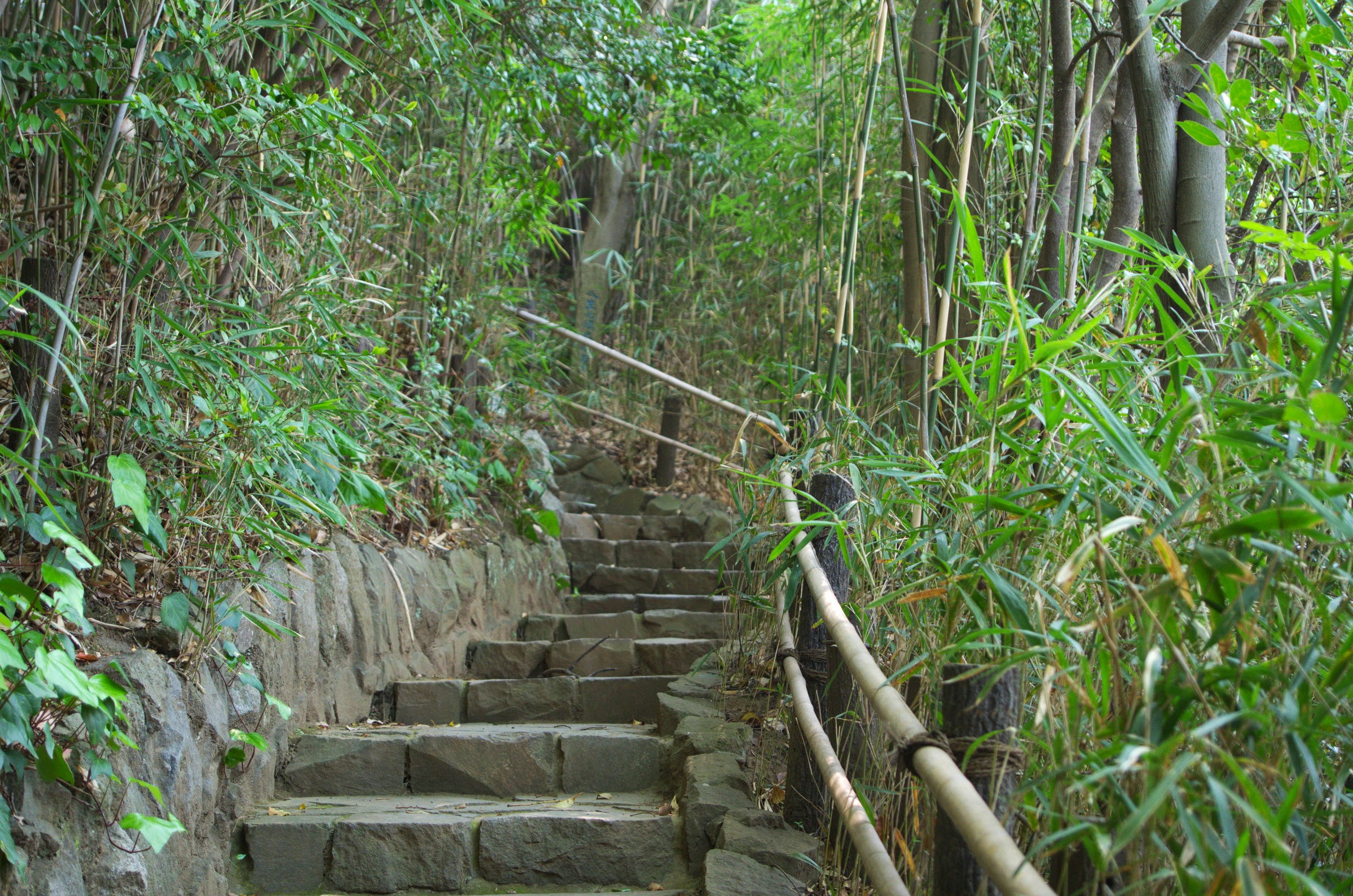
Upstairs from the Junction of Dualism (Nigenku)

== Literature ==
Schulzer, Rainer, ed. Guide to the Temple Garden of Philosophy (Toyo University Press, 2019). ISBN 978-4-908590-07-8

== See also ==
- Parks and gardens in Tokyo
- National Parks of Japan
