= Masaru Nashimoto =

- Born: 1 December 1944; Nakano, Tokyo, Japan
- Died: 21 August 2010 (aged 65); Tokyo
- Occupation: Reporter
- Website: http://kyosyuku.net

Masaru Nashimoto (梨元 勝, Nashimoto Masaru; 1 December 1944 – 21 August 2010) was a Japanese reporter who specialized in covering show-business gossip and scandals. He was born in Nakano, Tokyo.

== Career ==
After graduating from Hosei University in 1968, Nashimoto first worked as a magazine reporter for the publisher Kodansha. He became a reporter for a TV Asahi show in 1976, covering celebrity gossip and scandals. His catchphrase was "kyoshuku desu" (sorry to bother you) when questioning show business celebrities. He served as a guest professor at Hakodate University from 2000 to 2004.

== Lawsuits ==
In 2002, Nashimoto, together with the Tokyo Sports newspaper, was successfully sued by actor Mayo Kawasaki over insinuations that he had been involved in an extra-marital relationship.

== Illness and death ==
Nashimoto announced in June 2010 that he had been diagnosed with lung cancer. He died in a Tokyo hospital on 21 August 2010, aged 65.

== Works ==
- Nashimoto, Masaru (October 2009). 酒井法子隠された素顔 [Noriko Sakai - the Hidden True Face]. Japan: East press. ISBN 978-4781602783.
- Nashimoto, Masaru (September 2010). 絶筆 梨元です、恐縮です。―ぼくの突撃レポーター人生録 [Final Work: Sorry to Bother You, My name's Nashimoto - A Record of my Life as an Offensive Reporter]. Japan: Tembo Books. ISBN 978-4885462191.
