= Nakano, Tokyo =

Nakano-ku 中野
- Special ward
- Nakano City
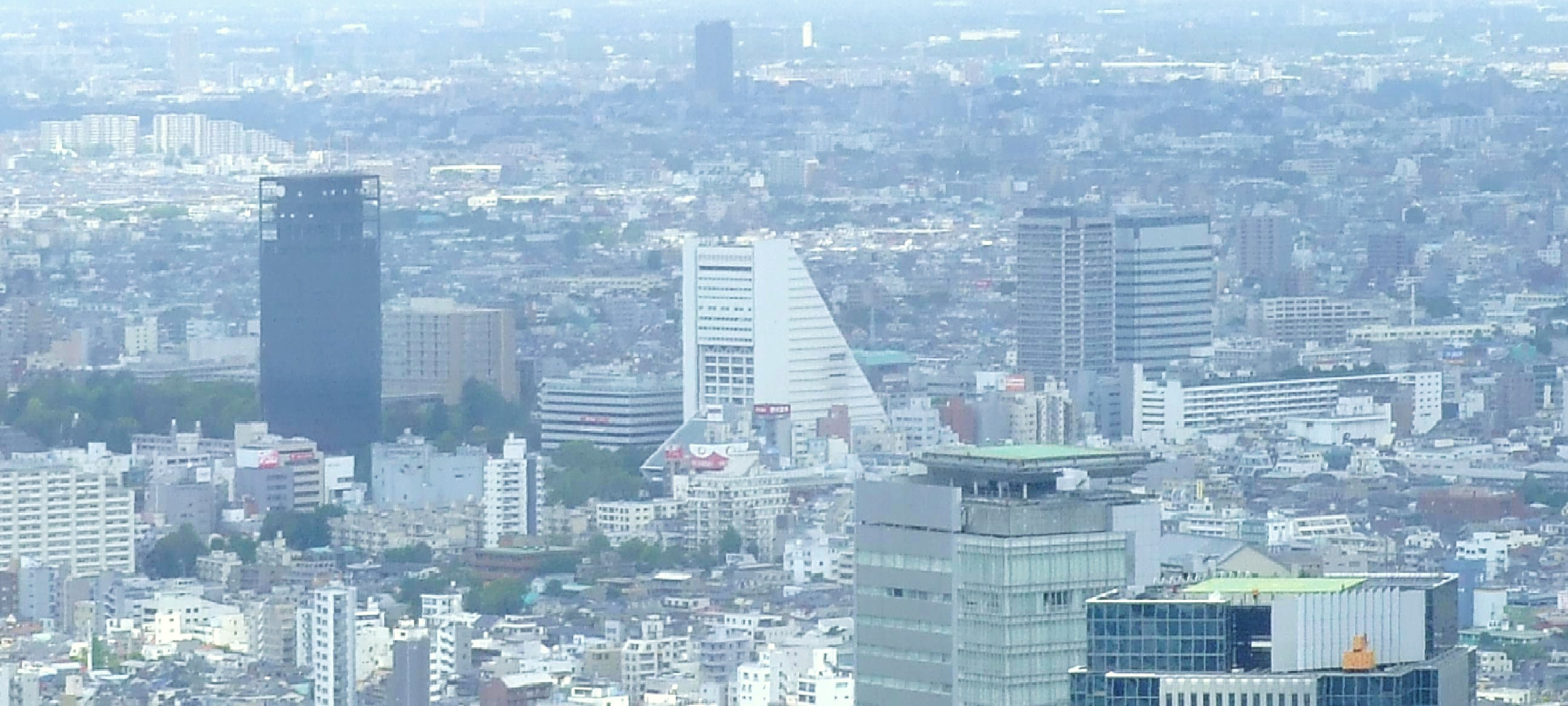
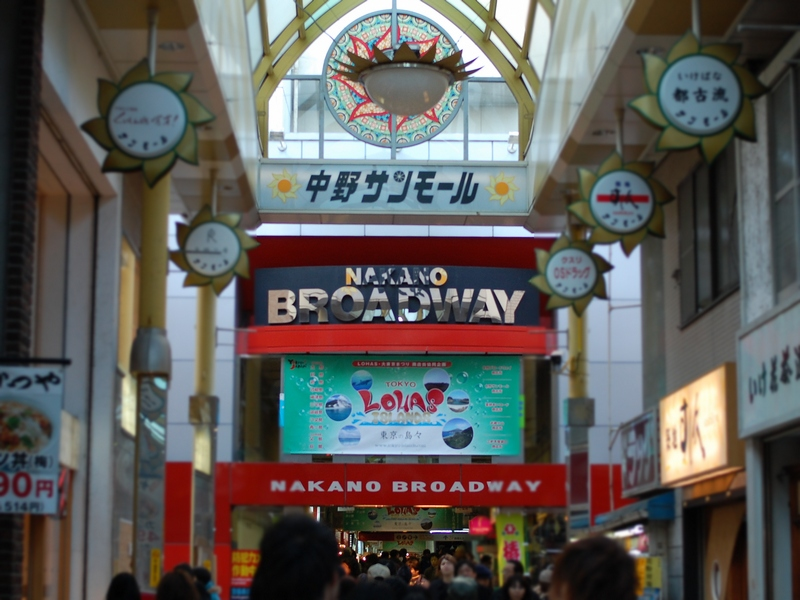
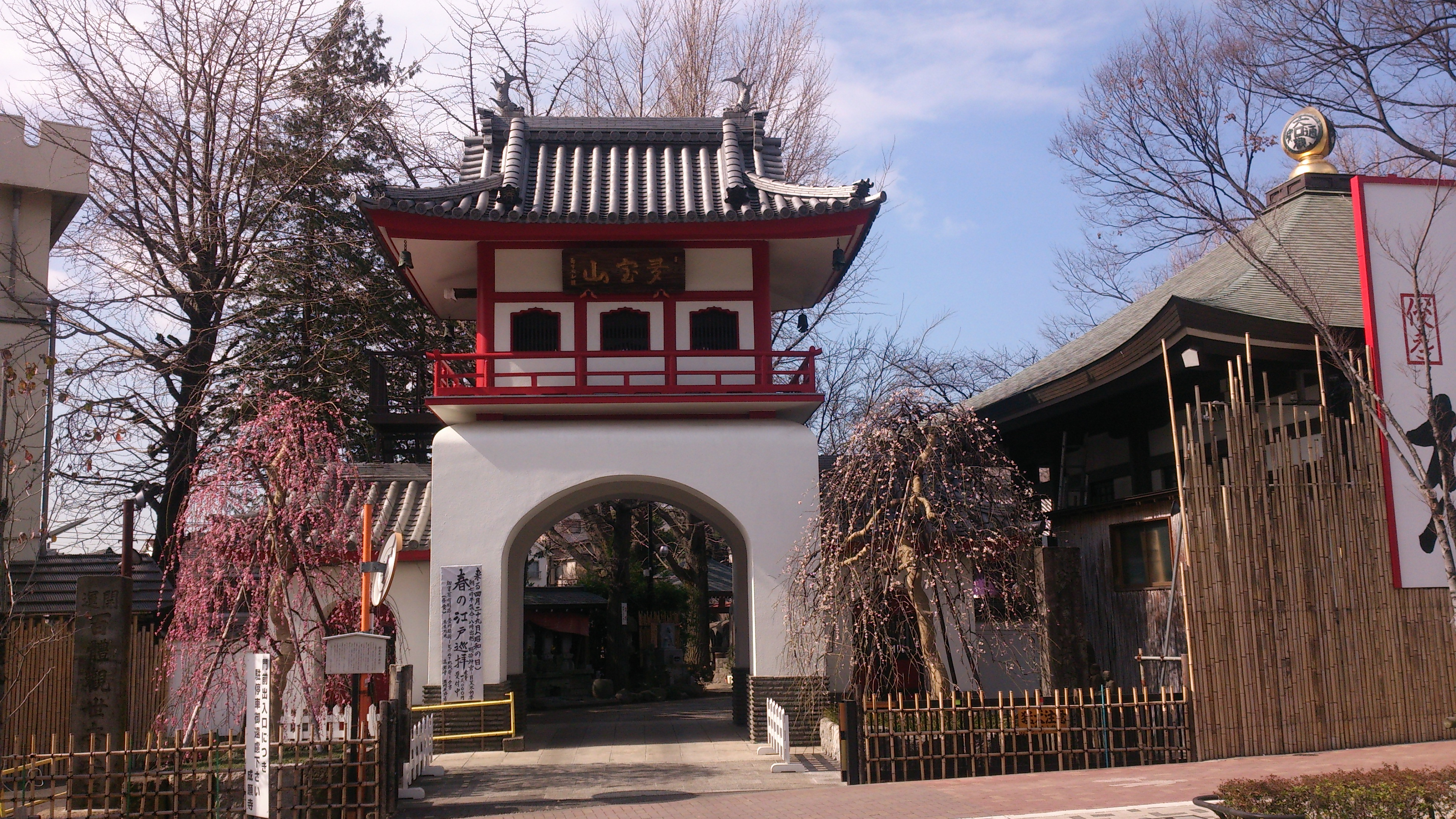
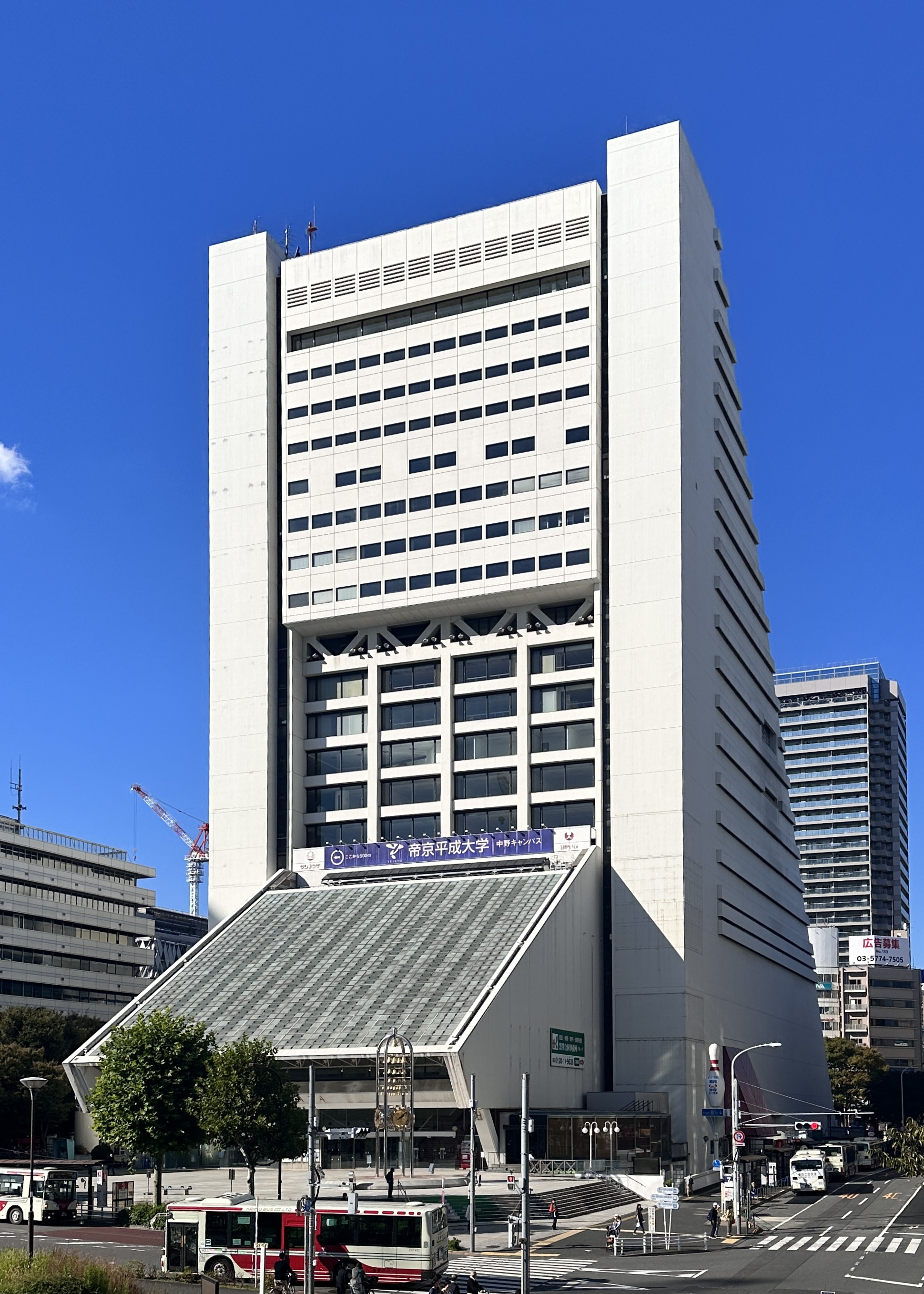
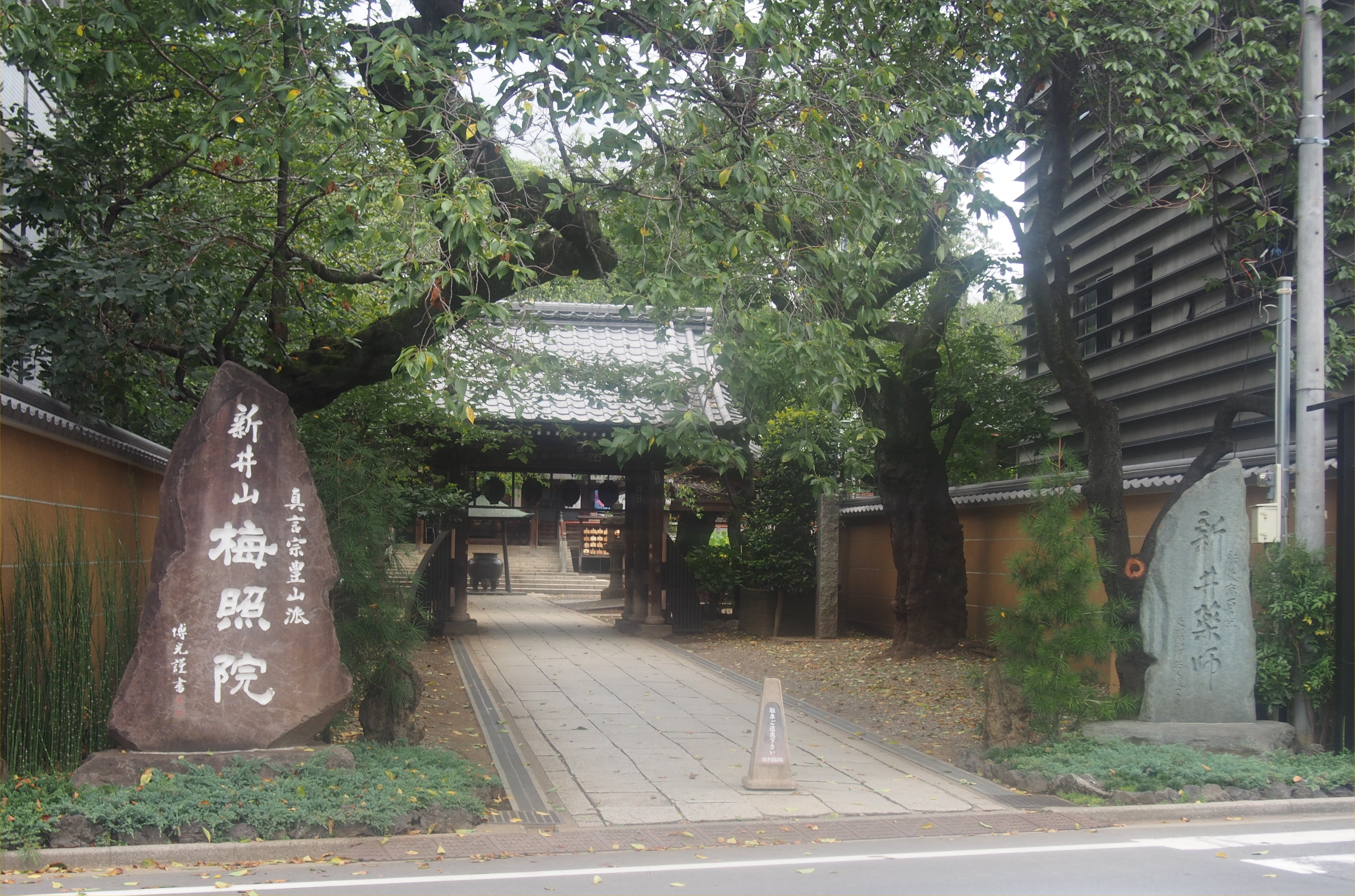
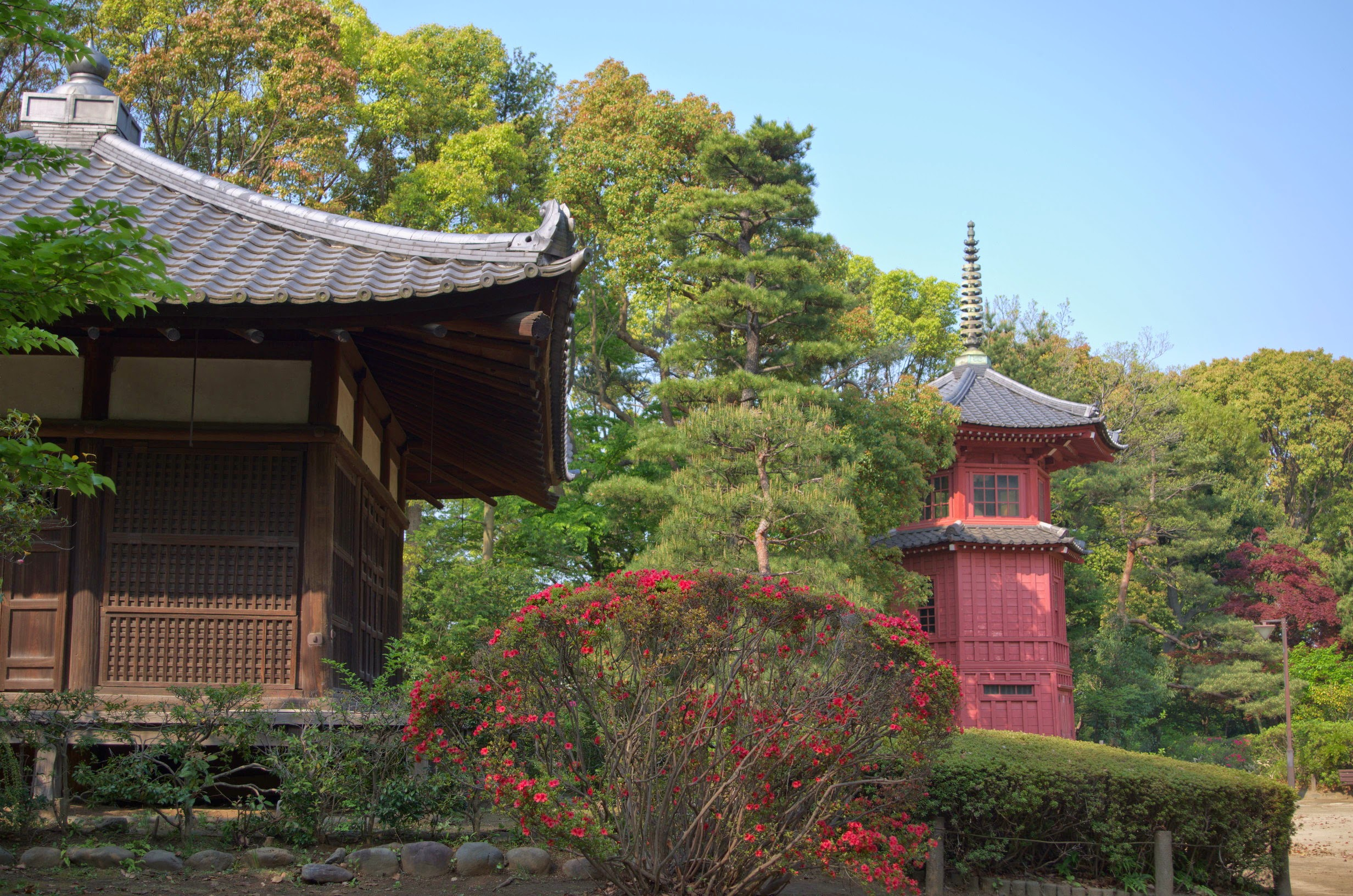
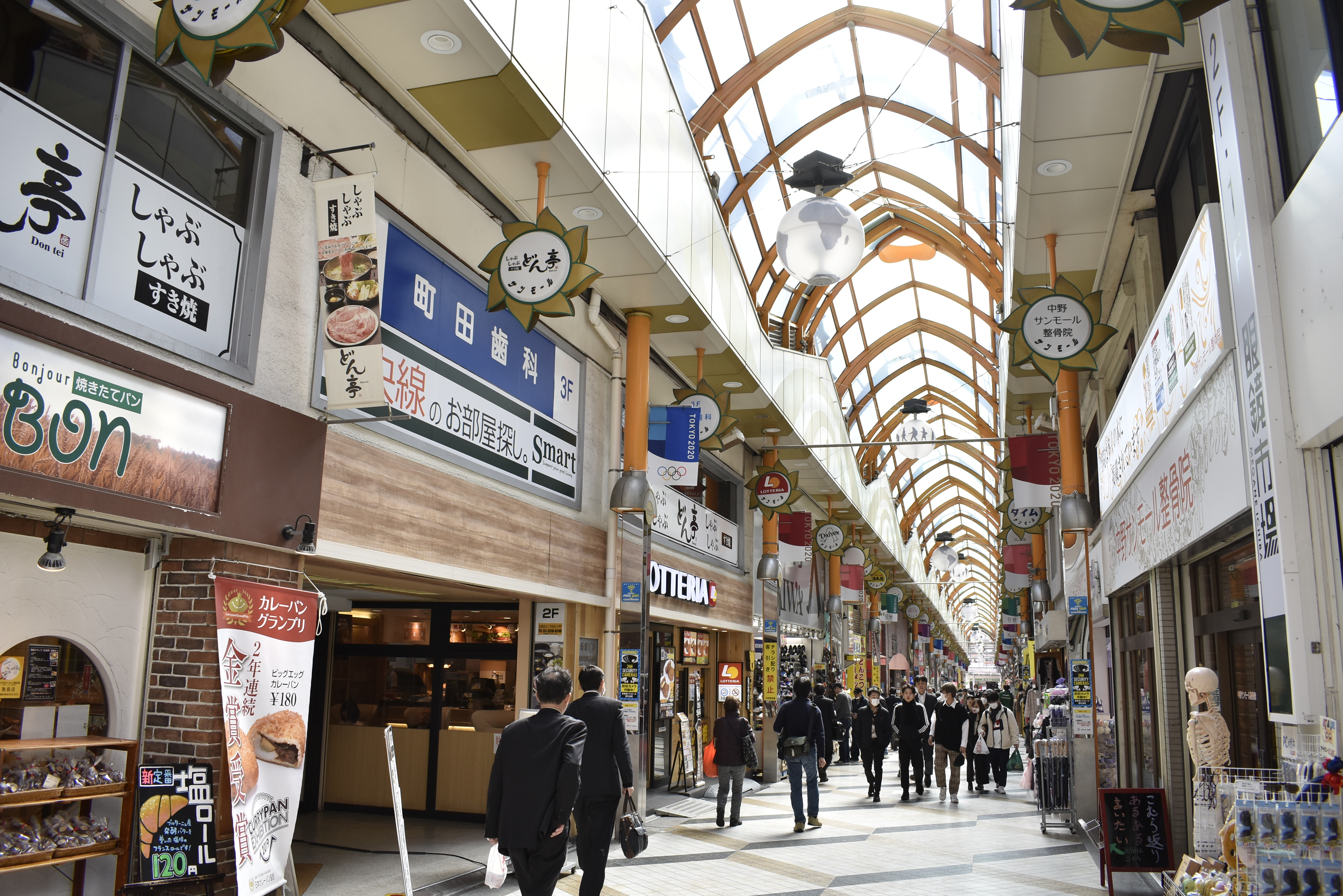
- Skyline around Nakano Station Nakano Broadway Jougan-ji Temple Nakano Sunplaza Araiyakushi Baishoin Temple Tetsugaku-dō Park Nakano Sun Mall

- Flag Seal

- Location of Nakano in Tokyo Metropolis

- Location in Japan
- Coordinates: 35°42′26.63″N 139°39′49.81″E
- Country: Japan
- Region: Kantō
- Prefecture: Tokyo Metropolis
- First official recorded: early 15th century
- As Tokyo City: October 1, 1932
- As Special ward of Tokyo: July 1, 1943

Government
  - Mayor: Naoto Sakai

Area
  - Total: 15.59 km^{2} (6.02 sq mi)

Population (October 1, 2020)
  - Total: 344,880
  - Density: 22,121/km^{2} (57,290/sq mi)
- Time zone: UTC+09:00 (JST)
- City hall address: 4-8-1 Nakano, Nakano, Tokyo; 164-8501
- Website: www.city.tokyo-nakano.lg.jp
- Symbols
- Flower: Azalea
- Tree: Castanopsis

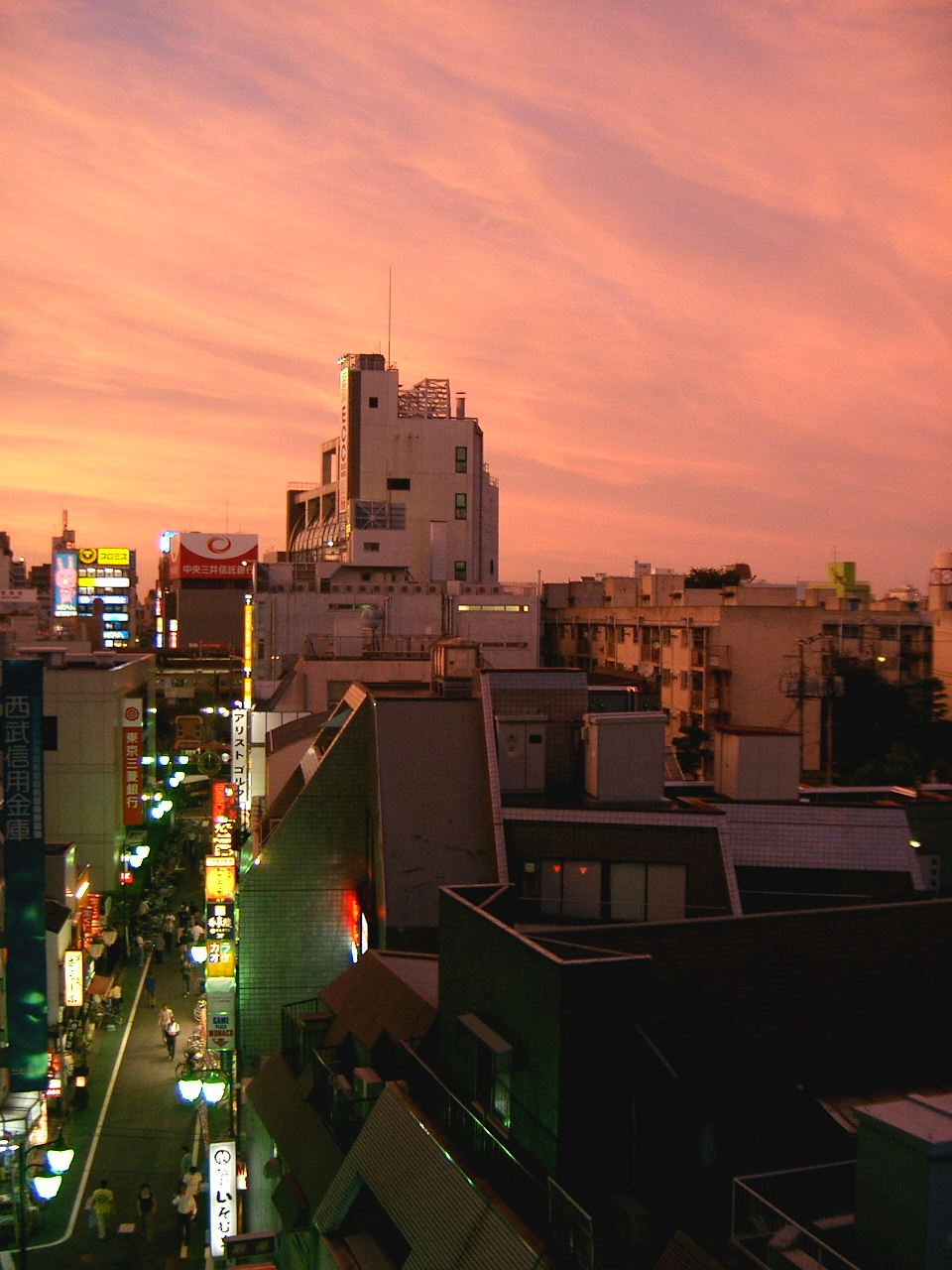
Sunset over Nakano, with Nakano Broadway in the distance

Nakano (中野; Japanese pronunciation: [nä̀.kä́.nó̞]) is a special ward in the Tokyo Metropolis in Japan. The English translation of its Japanese self-designation is Nakano City (中野, Nakano-ku; [nä̀.kä́.nó̞.kɯ̈̀]).

As of January 1, 2024, the ward has an estimated population of 337,377, and a population density of 21,640 persons per km^{2}. The total area is 15.59 km^{2}. Nakano is the most densely populated city in Japan.

== History ==
The ward was founded on October 1, 1932, when the towns of Nogata and Nakano were absorbed into the former Tokyo City as Nakano Ward. The present administration dates from March 15, 1947, when the Allied occupation reformed the administration of Tokyo-to.

- 1447: Ōta Dōkan defeated Toshima Yasutsune in a battle here.
- 1606: The Naruki Kaidō, predecessor of today's Ōme Kaidō (a road to Ōme) was established.
- 1695: In connection with the Shorui Awaremi no Rei (a law for the protection of animals), a facility for keeping wild dogs opened.
- 1871: The twelve villages that comprise present-day Nakano became part of Tokyo Prefecture.
- 1889: The Kofu Railway opens. The forerunner of today's Chūō Main Line included a station at Nakano en route from Shinjuku to Hachioji.
- 1897: Nakano becomes a village.
- 1932: Tokyo City expands to encompass the district that included Nakano.
- 1943: With the abolition of Tokyo City, Nakano becomes part of Tokyo-to.
- 1947: Nakano becomes one of the special wards under the new system.
- 1961: The Tokyo subway system extends to Nakano.
- 1973: Construction of Nakano Sun Plaza near Nakano Station reaches completion.
- 2016: Murder of Jiang Ge

== Demographics ==
Historical population
Year	Pop.	±%
1920	29,198	—
1930	134,098	+359.3%
1940	214,117	+59.7%
1945	124,011	−42.1%
1950	213,461	+72.1%
1960	351,360	+64.6%
1970	378,723	+7.8%
1980	345,733	−8.7%
1990	319,687	−7.5%
2000	309,526	−3.2%
2010	314,750	+1.7%
2020	344,880	+9.6%
Source: Censuses (Note: For years prior to 1930, figures cover the area of present-day Meguro-ku.)

== Districts and neighborhoods ==
Nakano Area

- Chūō
- Higashinakano
- Honchō
- Minamidai
- Nakano
- Yayoimachi

Nogata Area

- Arai
- Eharachō
- Ekoda
- Kamisaginomiya
- Kamitakada
- Maruyama
- Matsugaoka
- Nogata
- Numabukuro
- Saginomiya
- Shirasagi
- Wakamiya
- Yamatochō

== Geography ==
Five special wards surround Nakano: Shinjuku, Suginami, Nerima, Shibuya, and Toshima. It lies just west of the bustling Shinjuku area.

Rivers include the Kanda, Myosho-ji and Zenpuku-ji Rivers, and the Aratama Waterway.

== Places ==
- Nakano Sun Plaza: concert hall, hotel facilities
- Arai Yakushi Shingon Buddhist temple
- Nakano Broadway: otaku building (several floors of arcades, manga, anime, idol, music, toy and subculture specialty shops, as well as a well-regarded Namco arcade)
- GRIPS International House, apartment for foreign students studying at the National Graduate Institute for Policy Studies

== Education ==
=== Public schools ===
Metropolitan senior high and combined junior-senior high schools are operated by the Tokyo Metropolitan Government Board of Education.

- Fuji High School and Junior High School
- Minorigaoka High School
- Musashigaoka High School
- Nakano Technical High School
- Saginomiya High School
- Yotsuya Commercial High School

Municipal kindergartens, elementary schools, and junior high schools are operated by the Nakano City Board of Education.

Municipal junior high schools:

- No. 2 Junior High School (第二中学校)
- No. 5 Junior High School (第五中学校)
- No. 7 Junior High School (第七中学校)
- Kita Nakano Junior High School (北中野中学校)
- Meiwa Junior High School (明和中学校)
  - Merger of No. 4 Junior High School (第四中学校) and No. 8 Junior High School (第八中学校).
- Midorino Junior High School (緑野中学校)
- Minami Nakano Junior High School (南中野中学校)
- Nakano Junior High School (中野中学校)
- Nakano Higashi Junior High School (中野東中学校)
  - Merger of No. 3 Junior High School (第三中学校) and No. 10 Junior High School (第十中学校).

Municipal elementary schools:

- Egota Elementary School (江古田小学校)
- Ehara Elementary School (江原小学校)
- Hakuo Elementary School (白桜小学校)
- Heiwa no Mori Elementary School (平和の森小学校)
- Kami Saginomiya Elementary School (上鷺宮小学校)
- Keimei Elementary School (啓明小学校)
- Kitahara Elementary School (北原小学校)
- Midorino Elementary School (緑野小学校)
- Mihato Elementary School (美鳩小学校)
  - Formed by the merger of Wakamiya Elementary (若宮小学校) and Yamato Elementary (大和小学校)
- Minamidai Elementary School (南台小学校)
  - Formed by the merger of Niiyama Elementary (新山小学校) and Tada Elementary (多田小学校)
- Minamino Elementary School (みなみの小学校)
  - Formed by the merger of Nakano Shinmei Elementary (中野神明小学校) and Niiyama Elementary (新山小学校)
- Momozono No. 2 Elementary School (桃園第二小学校)
- Musashidai Elementary School (武蔵台小学校)
- Nakano No. 1 Elementary School (中野第一小学校)
  - Merger of Monozono Elementary School (桃園小学校) and Mukodai Elementary School (向台小学校)
- Nakano Hongo Elementary School (中野本郷小学校)
- Nishi Nakano Elementary School (西中野小学校)
- Reiwa Elementary School (令和小学校)
  - Merger of Arai Elementary School (新井小学校) and Kamitakada Elementary School (上高田小学校)
- Saginomiya Elementary School (鷺宮小学校)
- Toka Elementary School (桃花小学校)
- Tonoyama Elementary School (塔山小学校)
- Yato Elementary School (谷戸小学校)

Kindergartens:

- Higashi Nakano Kindergarten (ひがしなかの幼稚園)
- Kamisagi Kindergarten (かみさぎ幼稚園)

=== Private schools ===
- Horikoshi Gakuen High School
- Hosen Gakuen Junior and Senior High School - Has coeducational and girls' only sections
- Jissen Gakuen Junior and Senior High School
- Meiji Nakano Junior and Senior High School
- Meisei High School
- Nippon Wellness High School
- Nitobe Bunka Gakuen Junior and Senior High School
- Otsuma Nakano Junior and Senior High School - Girls' school
- Toa Gakuen High School

=== Colleges and universities ===
- Teikyo Heisei University Nakano Campus
- Tokyo Polytechnic University
- Meiji University Nakano Campus
- University of Tokyo Nakano campus
- Kokusai Junior College

== Transportation ==
=== Rail ===
Nakano Ward is served by the JR East Chūō and Sobu lines, the Seibu Shinjuku Line, the Tokyo Metro Tozai Line and Tokyo Metro Marunouchi Line, and the Toei Oedo Line.

- JR East
  - Chūō Line (Rapid), Chūō-Sōbu Line: Higashi-Nakano and Nakano Stations
- Seibu Railway
  - Seibu Shinjuku Line: Arai Yakushi-mae, Numabukuro, Nogata, Toritsu-Kasei, Saginomiya Stations
- Tokyo Metro
  - Marunouchi Line: Shin-Nakano, Nakano-Sakaue Stations
    - Honancho Branch Line: Nakano-Fujimicho, Nakano-Shimbashi, Nakano-Sakaue Stations
  - Tozai Line: Nakano, Ochiai (although the station is in Shinjuku, some entrances are in Nakano) Stations
- Tokyo Metropolitan Bureau of Transportation:
  - Toei Oedo Line: Nakano-Sakaue, Higashi-Nakano, Shin-egota Stations

=== Bus ===
A complicated bus network is constructed throughout Nakano Ward because most train lines only run east and west.

- Kanto bus
- Toei bus
- Kokusai Kogyo bus
- Keio bus

=== Roads ===
Shuto Expressway:

- C2 Central Circular Route (Nakano-chōjabashi exit)

Prefectural road:

- Tokyo Metropolitan Route 8 (Mejiro-dōri Ave., Shin-Mejiro-dōri Ave.)
- Tokyo Metropolitan Route 439 (Senkawa-dōri Ave.)
- Tokyo Metropolitan Route 440 (Shin-Ōme-kaidō Ave.)
- Tokyo Metropolitan Route 25 (Waseda-dōri Ave.)
- Tokyo Metropolitan Route 433 (Ōkubo-dōri Ave.)
- Tokyo Metropolitan Route 4 (Ōme-kaidō Ave.)
- Tokyo Metropolitan Route 14 (Hōnan-dōri Ave.)
- Tokyo Metropolitan Route 317 (Yamate-dōri St.; 6th Beltway)
- Tokyo Metropolitan Route 420 (Nakano-dōri St.)
- Tokyo Metropolitan Route 318 (Kannana-dōri St.; 7th Beltway)
- Tokyo Metropolitan Route 427 (Nakasugi-dōri St.)

== Business and entertainment ==
- Nakano-minamiguchi ekimae shōtengai – an outdoor arcade.
- Soft On Demand – a Japanese adult video group of companies has its headquarters in Nakano.
- MAPPA - a Japanese animation studio has its head office in Nakano.
- TMS Entertainment - a Japanese animation studio owned by Sega Corporation has its headquarters in Nakano.

=== Benza series ===
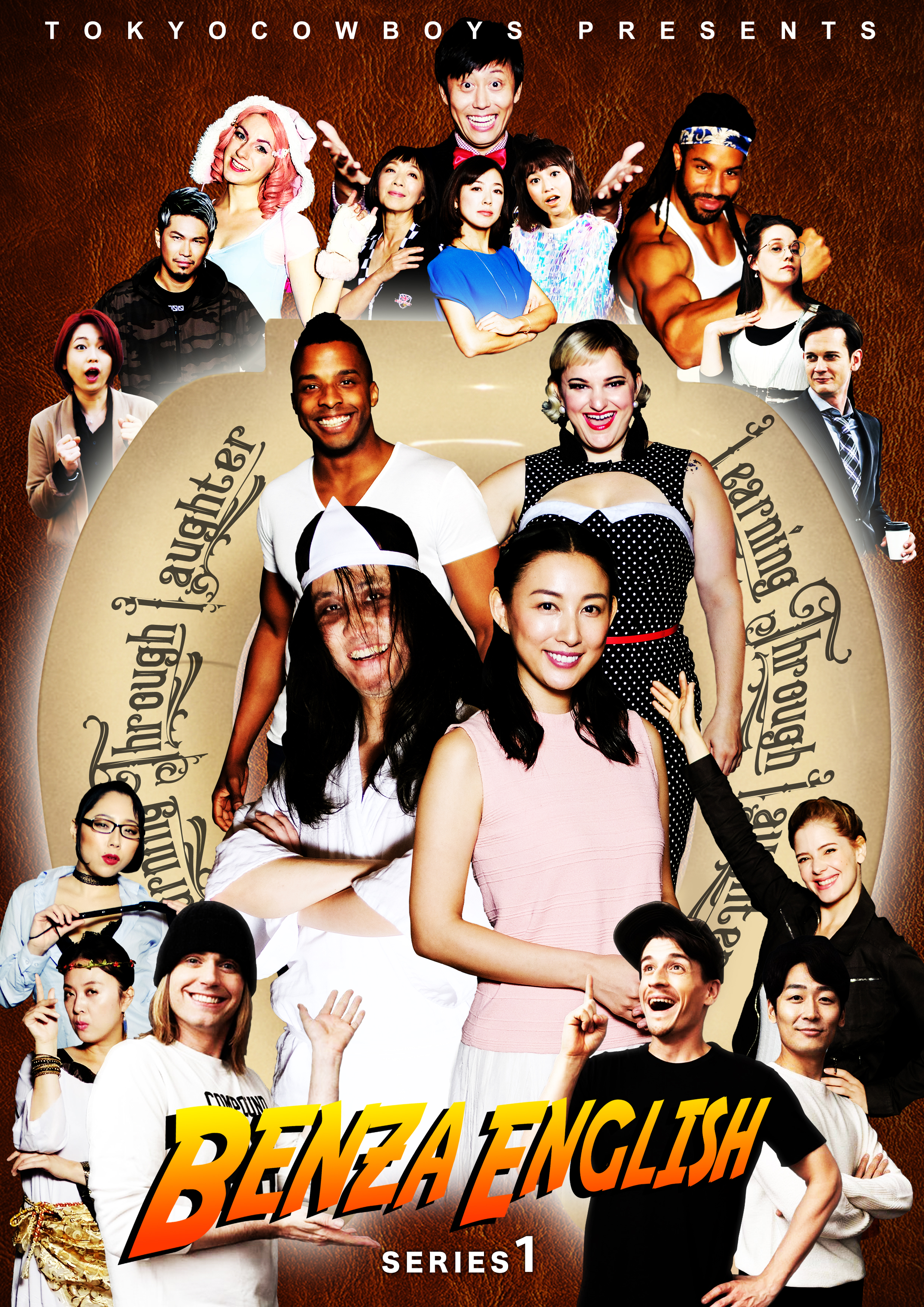
Promotional art for Benza English, a television show that takes place in Higashi Nakano

The Benza is a 2019 Amazon Prime Video series about two foreigners (Christopher McCombs and Kyle Card) who are trying to fix their broken toilet seat (便座, benza) and are suddenly tasked with saving the world. The series takes place entirely in Higashi Nakano. Benza English is a 2020 spin-off series that also takes place in Higashi Nakano. The Benza RPG is a 2020 video game adaption available on iOS, Android, and Steam.

== Notable people ==
- Ryuichi Sakamoto, composer and musician
- Kanako Yanagihara, comedian
- Mayumi Kojima, singer and songwriter
- Marika Matsumoto, voice actress, actress
- Shoko Sawada, singer and songwriter
- Yuji Tanaka, comedian
- El Lindaman, Japanese professional wrestler
- Yuhi Sekiguchi, Japanese racing driver
- Daigo, Japanese singer-songwriter, actor, talent, and voice actor
- Akiyoshi Nakao, Japanese actor
- Eiji Iijima, Japanese professional shogi player, ranked 7-dan
- Wataru Kamimura, Japanese professional shogi player, ranked 5-dan
- Tsunemi Kubodera, Japanese zoologist (National Museum of Nature and Science)
- Rieko Miura, Japanese actress, voice actress, singer and former member of the J-pop girlgroup Coco
- Masaru Nashimoto, Japanese show-business and gossips reporter
- Makoto Sasaki, Japanese professional shogi player, ranked 7-dan
- Takahiro Sonoda, Japanese classical pianist
- Michiko Yamamoto, Japanese writer and poet (Real Name: Michiko Furuya, Nihongo: 古屋道子, Furuya Michiko)
- Michiyo Yasuda, Japanese animator and colour designer
- Yoko Yamamoto, Japanese actress
- Hideo Kachi, Japanese musician (Real Name: Kachi Hidenori, Nihongo: カチヒデノリ, Hidenori Kachi)
- Kazushi Hagiwara, Japanese mangaka and the creator of Bastard!!
- Kenji Ohtsuki, Japanese rock musician and Seiun Award-winning writer
- Mayumi Kojima, Japanese Shibuya-kei musician
- Shoko Nakagawa, Japanese tarento (media personality), actress, voice actress, illustrator, MC and singer
- Kanako Yanagihara, Japanese actress, comedian, and tarento
- Masao Kobayashi, Japanese politician, member of the Democratic Party of Japan and member of the House of Councillors in the Diet (national legislature)
- Kentaro Shigematsu, Japanese football player (Kamatamare Sanuki, J3 League)
- Mitsuya Kurokawa, Japanese guitarist
- Mayumi Itsuwa, Japanese vocalist, composer, lyricist, and keyboardist
- Masatō Ibu, Japanese actor and voice actor
- Kiyoshiro Imawano, Japanese rock musician, lyricist, composer, musical producer, and actor (Real Name: Kiyoshi Kurihara, Nihongo: 栗原 清志, Kurihara Kiyoshi)
- Ray Fujita, Japanese actor and musician
- Shoko Sawada, Japanese singer-songwriter, reporter, and radio personality
- Tochisakae Atsushi, former sumo wrestler
- Takahiro Yamaguchi, Japanese former soccer player
- Christopher McCombs, American actor and tarento
- Tetsuzo Fuwa, Japanese communist politician
