= Alexander W. Hunter =

American actor (born 1988)

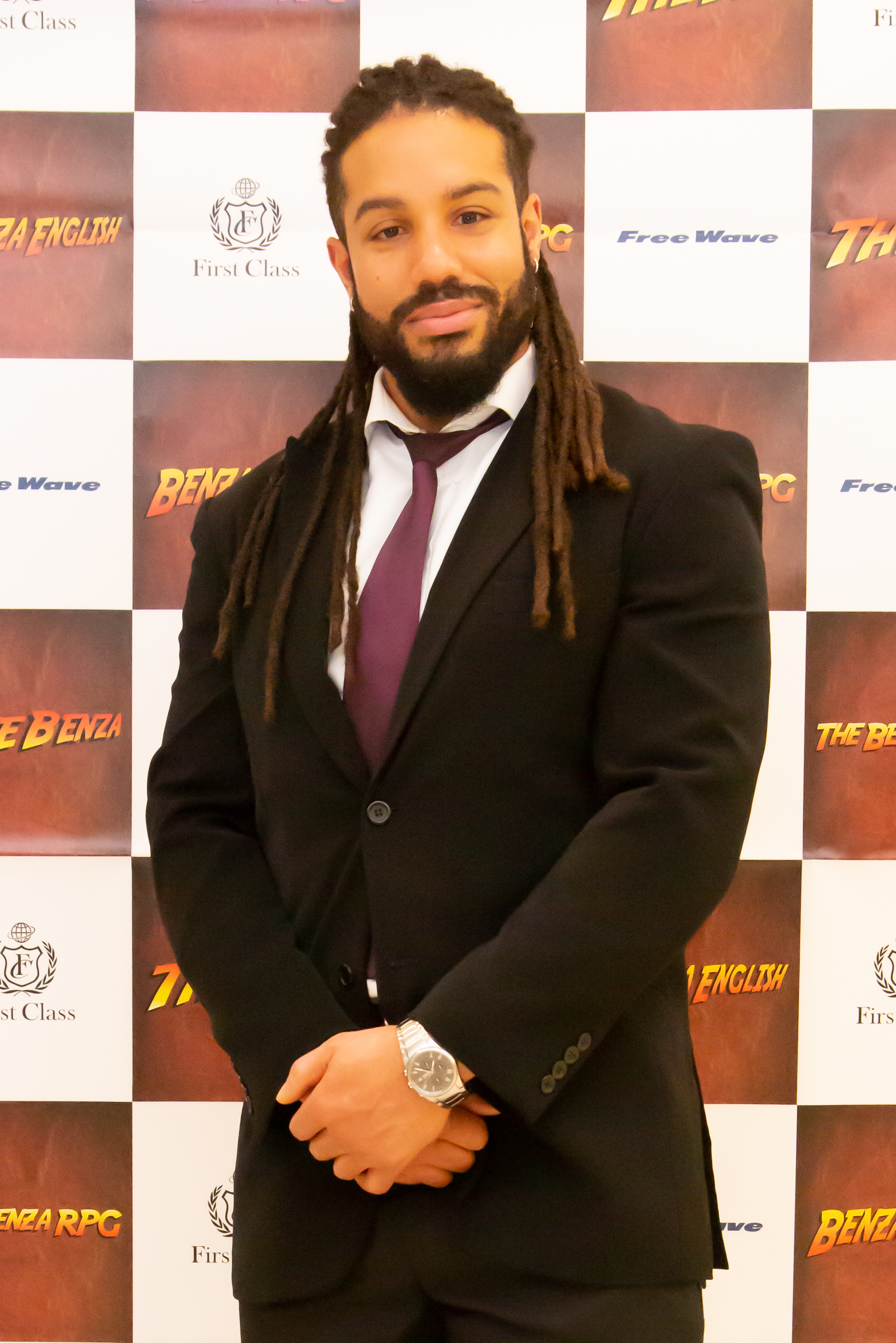
- Born: Alexander Windham Hunter; 3 May 1988 (age 38); Redmond, Washington, U.S.
- Education: Western Washington University
- Occupations: Actor, voice actor, model
- Parent: Al Hunter (American football)

Alexander Windham Hunter (born 3 May 1988) is an American actor, voice actor and model. He is known for his role of David in the Japanese on demand series The Benza and its spin off series Benza English on Amazon Prime Video. He is also known for his voice acting work for his role as Ultraman Ken in the Ultraman series Ultra Galaxy Fight: The Absolute Conspiracy.

== Early life ==
Alexander Hunter was born in Redmond, Washington, and spent his childhood moving with his father Seattle Seahawk's former running back Al Hunter (American football) across the western United States, including Kent, Federal Way, Milton, and Sparks, Nevada, before returning to Olympia, Washington, and completing his senior year in Shelton.

Hunter participated in sports such as American football, basketball, boxing, and kickboxing, and developed an early interest in video games and anime, which led to a broader fascination with Japanese culture. He began studying Japanese in high school and later earned a Bachelor of Arts in Japanese Studies at Western Washington University.

Hunter initially attended Whitworth University in Spokane before transferring to Western Washington University, where he retired from college football and became involved in performing arts through theater-major roommates. He spent six months in Japan as part of a study abroad program. Following his graduation in 2011, he returned to Japan in 2012, working first as a school teacher in Nishimera before transitioning into the entertainment industry.

== Career ==
As a bilingual performer, Hunter has appeared in numerous Japanese TV, film, video games, commercials, and theater productions.

He is best known for his role as David in the Amazon Prime Video comedy series The Benza and its spin-off Benza English. He also voiced the character in the accompanying video game The Benza RPG. In addition to his work on the series, Hunter has appeared in a number of Japanese television educational shows, including Omotenashi no Kiso Eigo on NHK Educational TV, where he played the regular role of Logan, and Nogizaka Cinemas: STORY of 46 on Fuji Television's on-demand service FOD. In 2020, Hunter won the "Rising Star" award at Seoul Webfest 2020 for his role as David in Benza English.

In film, Hunter portrayed Owen Scott in the 2019 romantic drama Little Nights, Little Love, and appeared in 1446: An Eternal Minute, as well as in supporting roles in High & Low: The Movie (2016) and its sequel End of Sky (2017).

As a voice actor, Hunter provided the English-language voice of Ultraman Ken in Ultra Galaxy Fight: The Absolute Conspiracy, and has contributed to narration and voiceover projects, including the Tokyo Dome’s TenQ Space Museum.

Hunter also works as a reporter and has been featured on the NHK World travel show Trails to Oishii Tokyo as well as Getting Dirty in Japan with The Benza co-stars Janni Olsson and Christopher McCombs. He additionally writes a semi-regular gardening column in The Empowerment Network magazine.

In 2024, Hunter moved to Sydney, Australia where he continues to work in entertainment including a role in the upcoming feature film Echo 8 Beyond and the role of Toby in the play A Behanding in Spokane at Flow Studios 88

He was represented by Free Wave Co., Ltd in Tokyo, Japan.

== Filmography ==
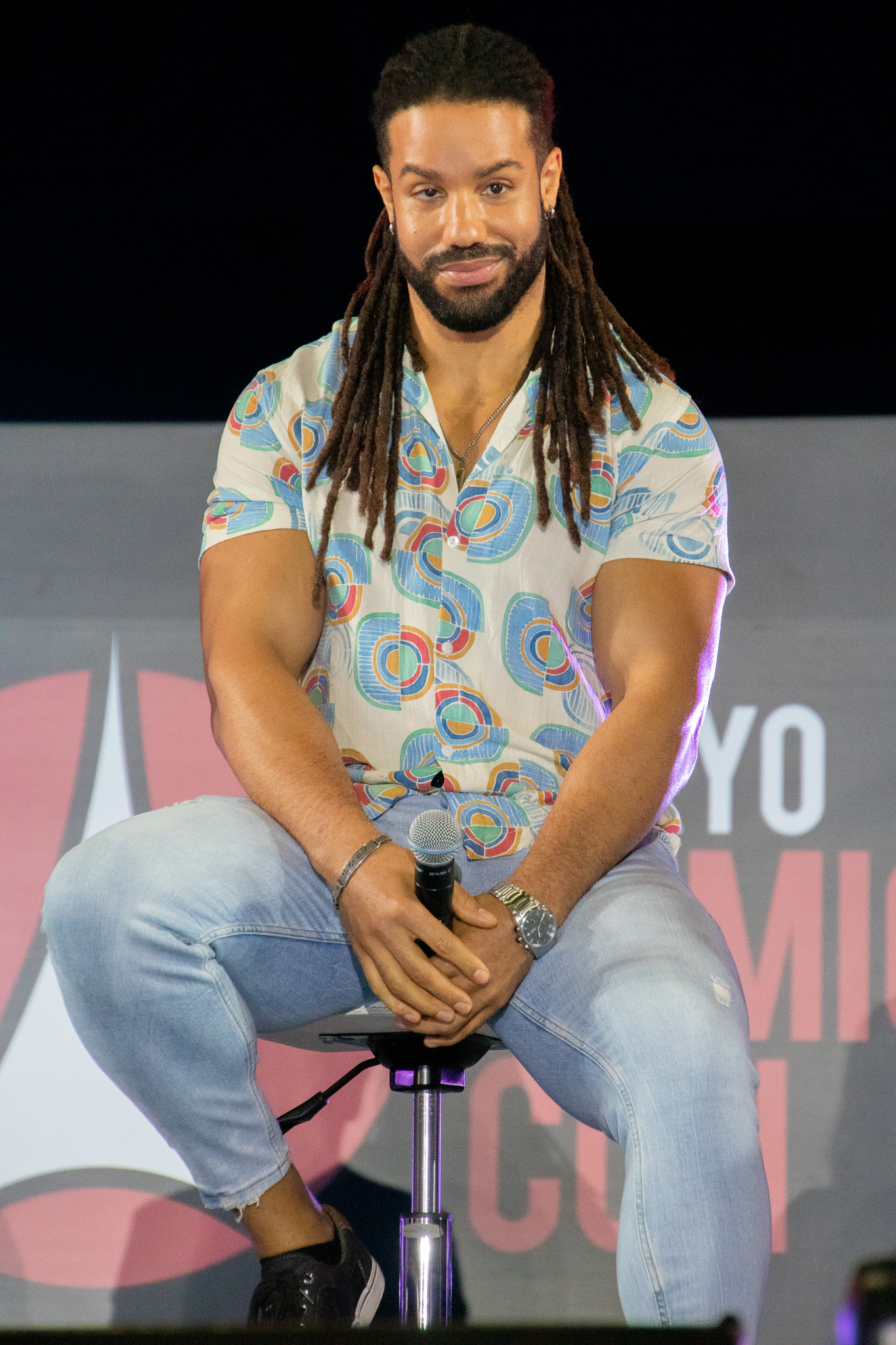
Hunter at Tokyo Comic Con 2022

=== Television ===
Year	Title	Role	Notes	Ref(s)
2018	Omotenashi No Kiso Eigo (おもてなしの基礎英語)	Logan		
2019–present	The Benza	David		
2020	Nogizaka Cinemas: Story of 46 (乃木坂シネマズ〜STORY of 46)	Avatar		
2020	Benza English	David		
2020	(おもてなし 即レス英会話)	Dion		
2023	Trails to Oishii Tokyo	Self	Reporter	
2025-present	Getting Dirty in Japan (ゲッティング・ダーティ・イン・ジャパン)	Self	Reporter	

=== Web series ===
Year	Title	Role	Notes	Ref(s)
2021	Ultra Galaxy Fight: The Absolute Conspiracy	Ultraman Ken		

=== Film ===
Year	Title	Role	Notes	Ref(s)
2016	High&Low The Movie			
2017	High&Low The Movie 2 / End of Sky			
2019	Little Nights, Little Love	Owen Scott		
2016	1446: An Eternal Minute	John		
2024	Aichaku	Shadow Customer	Voice Over	
2026	Echo 8 Beyond	The Tip	Post Production	

=== Music videos ===
Year	Artist	Title	Notes
2016	Mamoru Miyano	"Shout!"	
2020	The Oral Cigarettes	"Dream in Drive"	

=== Video games ===
Year	Title	Role	Notes	Ref(s)
2021	The Benza RPG	David		

=== Theater ===
Year	Production	Theater	Role	Ref(s)
2022	Dragon Bowl	Space Zero	Leonardo Goodman	
2025	A Behanding in Spokane	FLOW STUDIOS 88 CAMPERDOWN	Toby	
