= Free Wave =

Japanese talent agency

Free Wave CO., Ltd
- Native name: 株式会社フリー・ウエイブ
- Type: Kabushiki gaisha (Joint-stock company)
- Industry: Service industry (entertainment)
- Genre: Tarento management, actors, actresses, musical artists, comedians, entertainment management, commercial and television
- Founded: February, 1992
- Headquarters: NK Building 1st Floor, 3-Chome 19-10, Ikejiri, Setagaya, Tokyo, Japan; ZIP 154-0001,
- Area served: Japan
- Owner: Mutsumi Takahashi
- Website: f-w.co.jp

Free Wave Co., Ltd (株式会社フリー・ウエイブ) is a Japanese talent agency headquartered in Setagaya, Tokyo, specializing in foreign performers. Established in February 1992, the company began as a dance agency and has since expanded into seven divisions, including models, narrators/voice actors, cultural talents, actors, extras, singers/musicians, and dancers/performers. As of its 25th anniversary, Free Wave had registered over 2,500 foreign talents from more than 100 nationalities.

== History ==
Free Wave Co., Ltd. was founded in February 1992 by Mutsumi Takahashi in Setagaya, Tokyo. Initially focused on foreign dancers, Free Wave later expanded into other talent categories. Around ten years after its founding, the company launched a modeling division.

By its 25th anniversary, Free Wave reported representing more than 2,500 talents from over 100 countries, including models, narrators, actors, dancers, musicians, and performers.

Takahashi has stated that personal relationships with clients and talent have been a focus of the company's management philosophy.

== Philanthropy ==
Free Wave is listed as a donor by Japan Platform (ジャパン・プラットフォーム) in connection with relief efforts following the 2011 Tōhoku earthquake and tsunami.

The company was also listed as a supporting organization in the Tokyo Metropolitan Chapter of the Japanese Red Cross Society's Tsunagu Project. As part of the project, Free Wave received a certificate of appreciation from the Japanese Red Cross Society.[9] Takahashi commented on the importance of individual participation in disaster recovery efforts.

== Public Incidents ==
In early 2024, Free Wave represented Karolina Shiino (椎野カロリーナ), the winner of the 2024 Miss Nippon Grand Prix beauty pageant. The agency publicly responded after Shūkan Bunshun revealed that Shiino had an extramarital affair with a married man. Free Wave initially denied the allegations but later confirmed that Shiino had continued the relationship after learning his marital status. Following further review, Shiino requested the termination of her contract, which Free Wave accepted.

Shiino subsequently relinquished her Miss Nippon title. The case received coverage in both Japanese and international media, and Free Wave issued a public statement regarding the contract termination, emphasizing the agency’s adherence to professional conduct.

== Notable talents ==
- Christopher McCombs
- Janni Olsson
- Guy Perryman
- Ananda Jacobs
- Kyle Card
- Diana Garnet
- Maxwell Powers
- Shizuka Anderson
- Yves Lafontaine
- Eric Kelso
- Paula Berwanger
- Brandon Francis
- Robert Belgrade
- Peter von Gomm

== Former talents ==
- Karolina Shiino
- Paul Jackson (bassist)
