= Getting Dirty in Japan =

- Domestic poster for Getting Dirty in Japan
- Also known as: ゲッティング・ダーティ・イン・ジャパン
- Genre: Adventure travel
- Created by: Christopher McCombs; Janni Olsson
- Directed by: Raito Nishizaka; Michael Williams
- Starring: Janni Olsson; Christopher McCombs; Emika Kamieda; Masahito Kawahata; Haku Inko
- Theme music composer: Takahiro Nomiya
- Opening theme: "Waiting to be Seen" by Fossilize
- Country of origin: Japan
- Original languages: English; Japanese
- No. of seasons: 2
- No. of episodes: 12

Production
- Executive producer: Christpher McCombs
- Producers: Janni Olsson; Masahito Kawahata (s. 2); Haku Inko (s. 1)
- Running time: 20 minutes

Original release
- Network: Amazon Prime Video; Tubi

Getting Dirty in Japan (ゲッティング・ダーティ・イン・ジャパン) is a Japanese adventure tourism television series made by Tokyo Cowboys and is hosted by Swedish outdoor specialist and reporter Janni Olsson with Christopher McCombs as a co-host. The series is available on Amazon Prime Video in Japan and Tubi in North America.

== Program synopsis ==
In the first season, Olsson and her team including Japanese tarento Haku Inko, American actor Christopher McCombs, British director Michael Williams, and Japanese director Raito Nishizaka challenge two activities introduced by Olsson as part of a theme at the start of each episode. Featured activities include surfing, fishing, kayaking, paragliding, and camping.

At the end of each episode, Olsson and McCombs rate the activities with Olsson evaluating as an outdoor enthusiast and McCombs evaluating as someone who is not very interested in the outdoors. Episodes are completely unscripted in order to preserve the reality of each activity.

From the second season, Japanese Idol Emika Kamieda replaced Haku Inko as the studio MC. In addition, between outdoor activities, a cooking corner was introduced that is co-hosted by Olsson and new cast member Masahito Kawahata.

== Production details ==
Olsson, an outdoor reporter based out of Tokyo, Japan, was tired of Japanese outdoor television shows that were not painting an honest picture of outdoor activities. She believed that many activities were either being played up as too easy or too difficult for ratings. She wanted to create a television show that gave a more realistic look at outdoor activities in Japan.

McCombs, Inko, Nishizaka, Williams and Olsson had all previously worked together on the Amazon Prime Video series The Benza and its spin-off series Benza English. Between the first and second season of The Benza, Olsson approached McCombs initially about starting a YouTube channel, but McCombs convinced her to make the show into a streaming series instead and came on as an executive producer.

Olsson stated that her targets for the show are not only current outdoor enthusiasts, but also women who are interested in trying an outdoor sport or activity as well as people who are not comfortable with the outdoors. One of her goals was to try to help the people who are not comfortable with the outdoors find points that they could enjoy on each of the adventures.

Preproduction began in 2020 with the pilot episode being shot in Chiba, Japan during the summer. Production continued on the first season from winter of 2021 and continued until spring of 2022 with episodes being shot in Yamanashi, Ibaraki, and Tokyo.

Production began on the second season in spring of 2024 with the shooting predominantly taking place over the summer months. Emika Kamieda joined as the studio mc after getting to know Olsson and McCombs on the set of Tokyo Cowboy's feature film Aichaku replacing Haku Inko. Masahito Kawahata worked with Olsson and McCombs on The Benza and Benza English. He was brought in by Olsson to appear with her in a cooking segment that was shot in a kitchen studio.

In 2026, Olsson released Fika With a View, a companion book featuring Swedish fika and seasonal recipes, with recipes from the book also prepared on Getting Dirty in Japan.

== Theme music ==
The theme song, "Waiting to be Seen" was performed by Fossilize with lyrics by Christopher McCombs and music by Takahiro Nomiya. It was released as a single on June 5, 2023, and reached number four on the Japanese iTunes soundtrack chart as well as number five on the Swedish iTunes soundtrack chart.

Digital single

1. "Waiting to be Seen" – 3:18
2. "Waiting to be Seen (Remix)" – 4:32

== Cast ==
=== Season 1 ===
- Janni Olsson
- Christopher McCombs
- Haku Inko
- Raito Nishizaka
- Michael Williams

=== Season 2 ===
- Janni Olsson
- Christopher McCombs
- Emika Kamieda
- Masahito Kawahata
- Raito Nishizaka
- Michael Williams
- Alexander W. Hunter (Guest reporter)

== Staff ==
=== Season 1 ===
- Director: Raito Nishizaka, Michael Williams
- Executive Producer: Christopher McCombs
- Producer: Haku Inko, Janni Olsson
- Associate Producer: Masahito Kawahata
- Sound Producer: Takahiro Nomiya
- Japanese Translation: Masahito Kawahata
- English Translation: Christopher McCombs, Janni Olsson
- English Subtitles: Jeff Cisneros, Heather Payer-Smith, Eda Sterner

=== Season 2 ===
- Director: Raito Nishizaka, Michael Williams
- Executive Producer: Christopher McCombs
- Producer: Janni Olsson, Masahito Kawahata
- Associate Producer: Karen Callahan
- Sound Producer: Takahiro Nomiya
- Japanese Translation: Masahito Kawahata
- English Translation: Christopher McCombs, Janni Olsson
- English Subtitles: Jeff Cisneros, Heather Payer-Smith, Eda Sterner

== Episodes ==
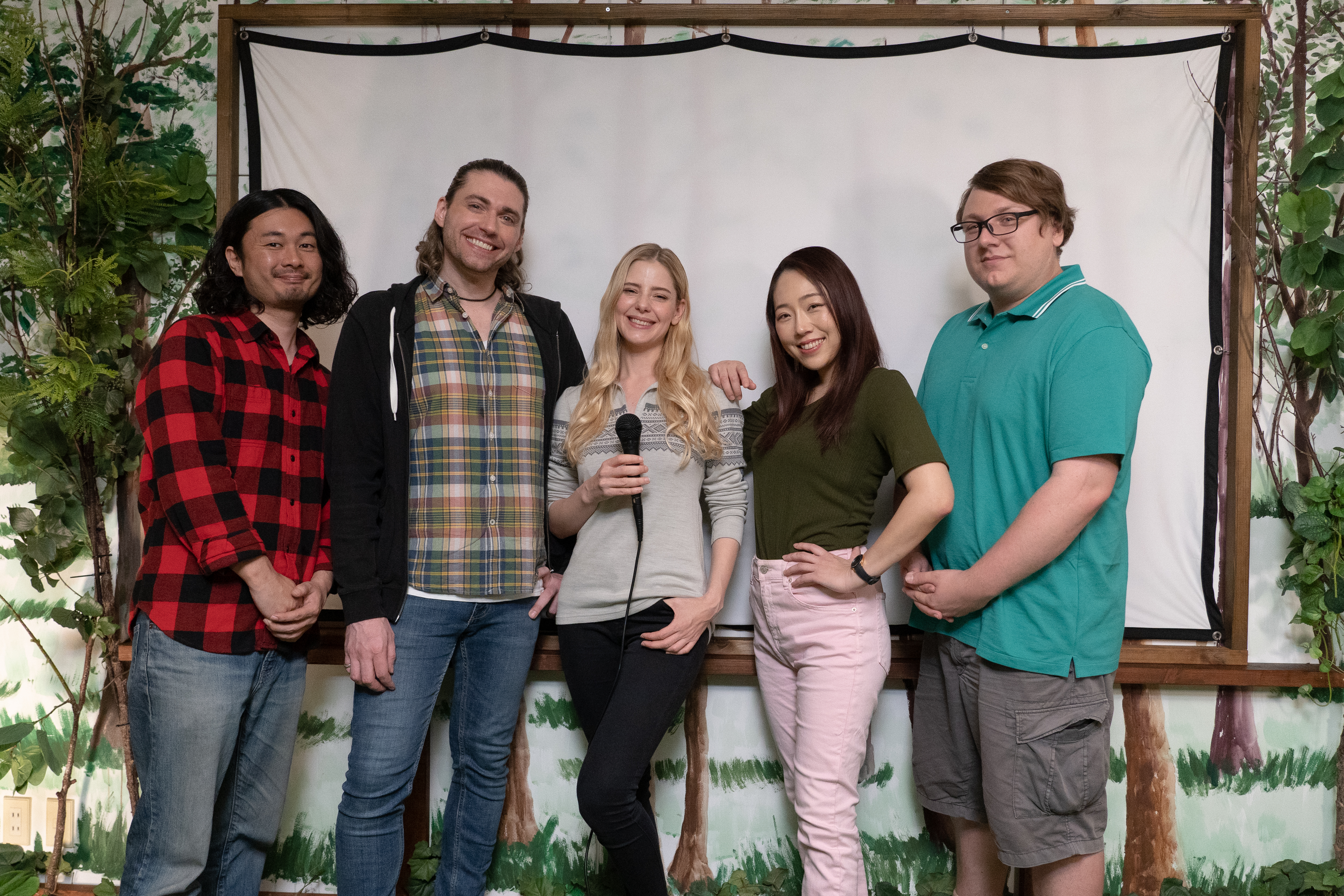
Nishizaka, McCombs, Olsson, Inko, and Williams at a promotional event for Getting Dirty in Japan.

=== Season 1 (2023) ===
#	Title	Directed by
1	"Getting Started"	Raito Nishizaka
2	"Becoming Tarzan"	Michael Williams
3	"Getting Wet"	Michael Williams
4	"Something New"	Raito Nishizaka
5	"Getting Dirty"	Raito Nishizaka
6	"A Surprise Finish"	Michael Williams

=== Season 2 (2025) ===
#	Title	Directed by
1	"A New Departure"	Raito Nishizaka, Michael Williams
2	"Getting a Grip"	Raito Nishizaka, Michael Williams
3	"Getting Dirty with Friends"	Raito Nishizaka, Michael Williams
4	"Taking it Easy"	Raito Nishizaka, Michael Williams
5	"Getting Perspective"	Raito Nishizaka, Michael Williams
6	"A Change of Plans"	Raito Nishizaka, Michael Williams

== Reception ==
Getting Dirty in Japan currently has a review average of 4.9/5.0 on Amazon Prime Video of Japan and a 9.8/10 rating on IMDb as of August 2023. The show has been reviewed favorably in Japanese mass media, especially the unscripted nature and the counterpoint of having someone who is not interested in the outdoors also reviewing the activities.
