= Raito Nishizaka =

Japanese film director (born 1985)

- 西坂來人
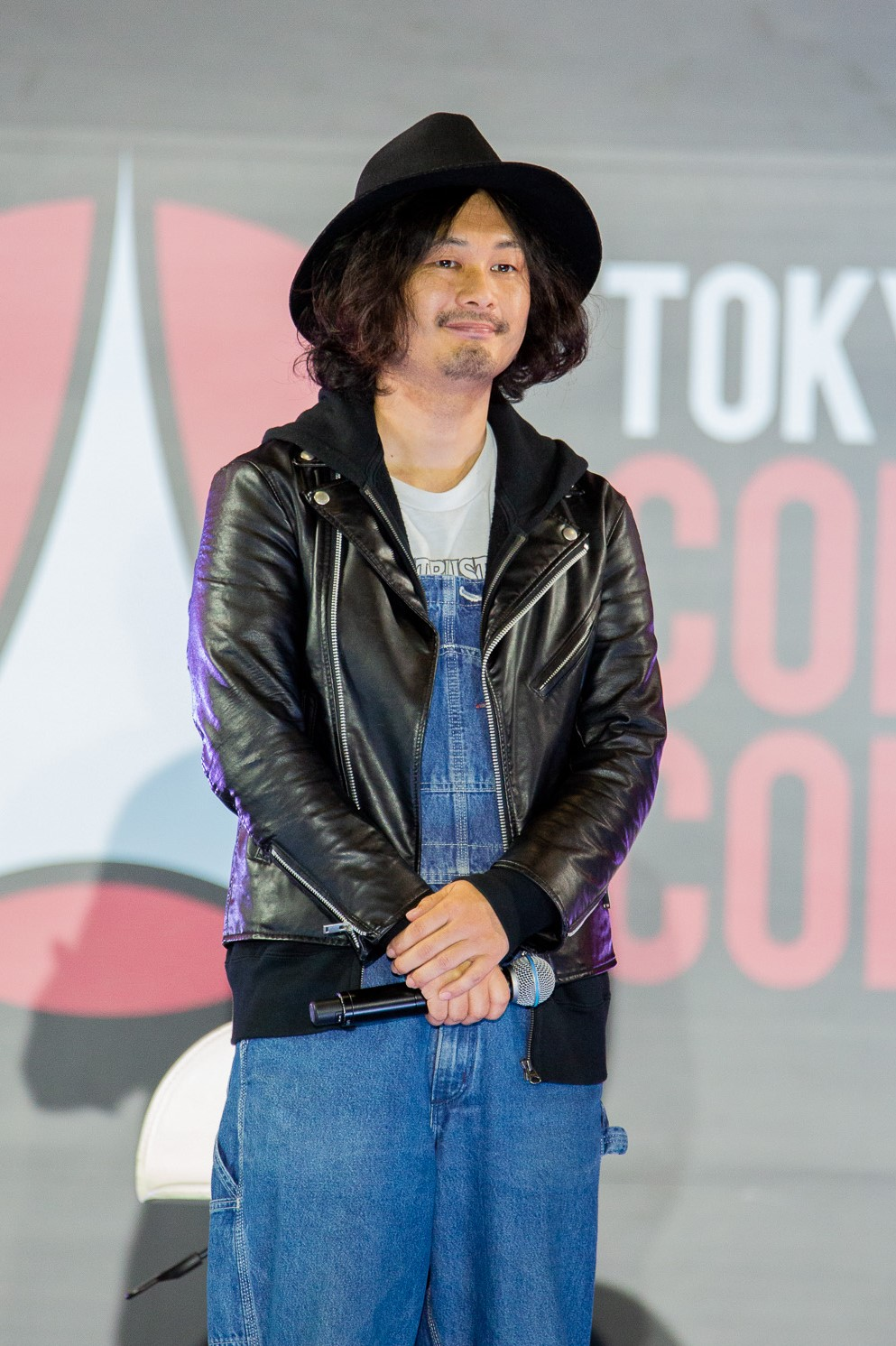
- Nishizaka at Tokyo Comic Con 2022
- Born: 4 December 1985 (age 40); Fukushima, Japan
- Other name: Nishizaka Raito
- Occupation: Director
- Notable work: Aichaku; The Benza; Getting Dirty in Japan

Raito Nishizaka (西坂來人, Nishizaka Raito; born 4 December 1985) is a Japanese director and illustrator known for his work on the Japanese feature film Aichaku and the Japanese comedy series The Benza and travel documentary series Getting Dirty in Japan.

== Early life ==
Nishizaka was born in Fukushima, Japan. In order to escape domestic violence by his father, he spent the fifth and sixth grades at Soma Aiikuen, a children's home in Sōma, Fukushima Prefecture. During his stay at the orphanage, he was deeply affected by the stories of child abuse and the harsh situations many of the young people faced after leaving the orphanage. He was returned to his mother soon after he entered junior high school.

Upon graduating high school, Nishizawa joined a newspaper scholarship program that allowed him to attend school while delivering newspapers. He used this scholarship to enter the directing course at Nikkatsu Art Academy, a film school in Tokyo. While in school, he directed a short film, “Like Back Then,” which won the Excellence Award at the West Tokyo Film Festival.

== Career ==
After graduation, he worked as an art assistant for special effects films and TV programs before becoming a freelance film director and illustrator including several picture books.

In 2014, he joined the Tokyo-based production company Tokyo Cowboys. In 2018, Nishizaka notably directed the short film version of the Amazon Prime Video comedy series The Benza that would go on to become the series' pilot episode. He additionally directed the entire first series of The Benza as well as episodes of the second series and the spin-off series Benza English. Nishizaka also directed several episodes of Tokyo Cowboy's 2023 travel documentary series Getting Dirty in Japan, which features several of the cast members and staff from The Benza including Janni Olsson and Christopher McCombs.

In 2023, Nishizaka co-directed with frequent collaborator Michael Williams his first feature film, Aichaku, which was released on Amazon Prime Video in 2025.

Nishizaka continues to work as an illustrator and has released several children's picture books as well as providing artwork for The Benza RPG, a retro-RPG spin-off of The Benza.

== Philanthropy ==
Affected by his time in foster care as a child, Nishizaka continues to promote issues surrounding the foster care system and child abuse in Japan through his work.

"Railroad Switch," a short film he produced and directed in 2018, depicts the story of several people who grew up in orphanages and issues they face with society. "Mother and Daughter," a short film Nishizaka directed in 2025, also looks at the cycle of generational abuse. He also lectures about the importance of providing support for young people who have left foster care and those who cannot rely on their parents.

In 2019, he began producing a YouTube program called “The Three Flags” with Masako Yamamoto and Satoshi Brojan who also experienced growing up in orphanages. The point of "The Three Flags" is to continue to increase awareness about social issues surrounding the foster care system in Japan as well as other social issues focusing on children.

== Filmography ==
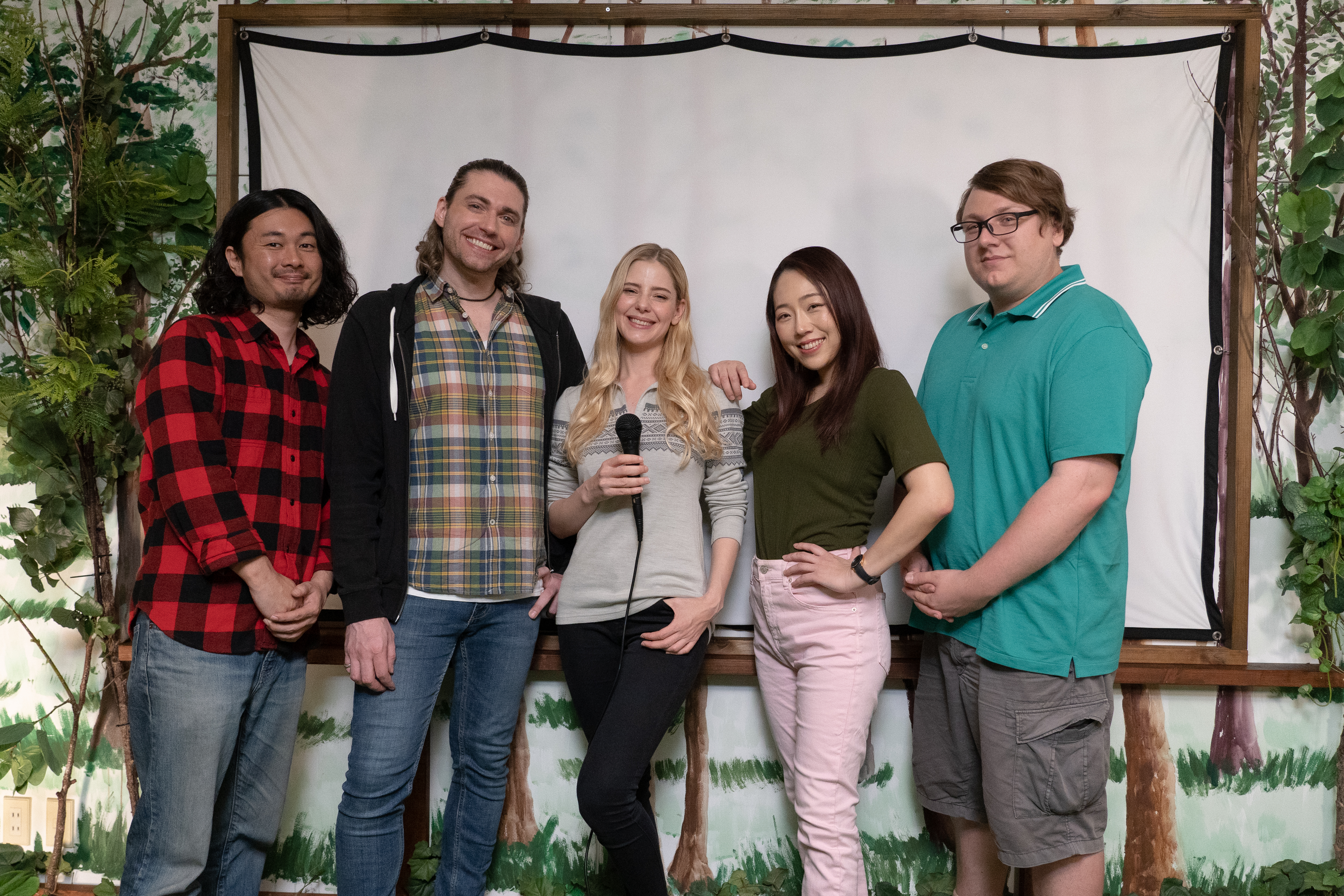
Nishizaka at the premiere of Getting Dirty in Japan 2023

=== Television ===
Year	Title	Notes	Ref
2019	The Benza Series 1		
2020	Benza English	Co-directed with Michael Williams	
2022	The Benza Series 2	Episodes 1, 2, 6, 7	
2023	Getting Dirty in Japan Series 1	Episodes 1, 2, 5	
2025	Getting Dirty in Japan Series 2	Co-directed with Michael Williams	

=== Short films ===
Year	Title	Notes	Ref
2018	Railroad Switch		
2025	Mother and Daughter		

=== Feature films ===
Year	Title	Notes	Ref
2018	The Wheel	Omnibus film, directed "The Sister"	
2024	Aichaku	Co-directed with Michael Williams	

=== Video Games ===
Year	Title	Notes	Ref
2022	The Benza RPG	Opening scene	

== Illustration ==
=== Video Games ===
Year	Title	Notes	Ref
2022	The Benza RPG	Monster Design, Battle Sprites	
