= Christopher McCombs =

American actor

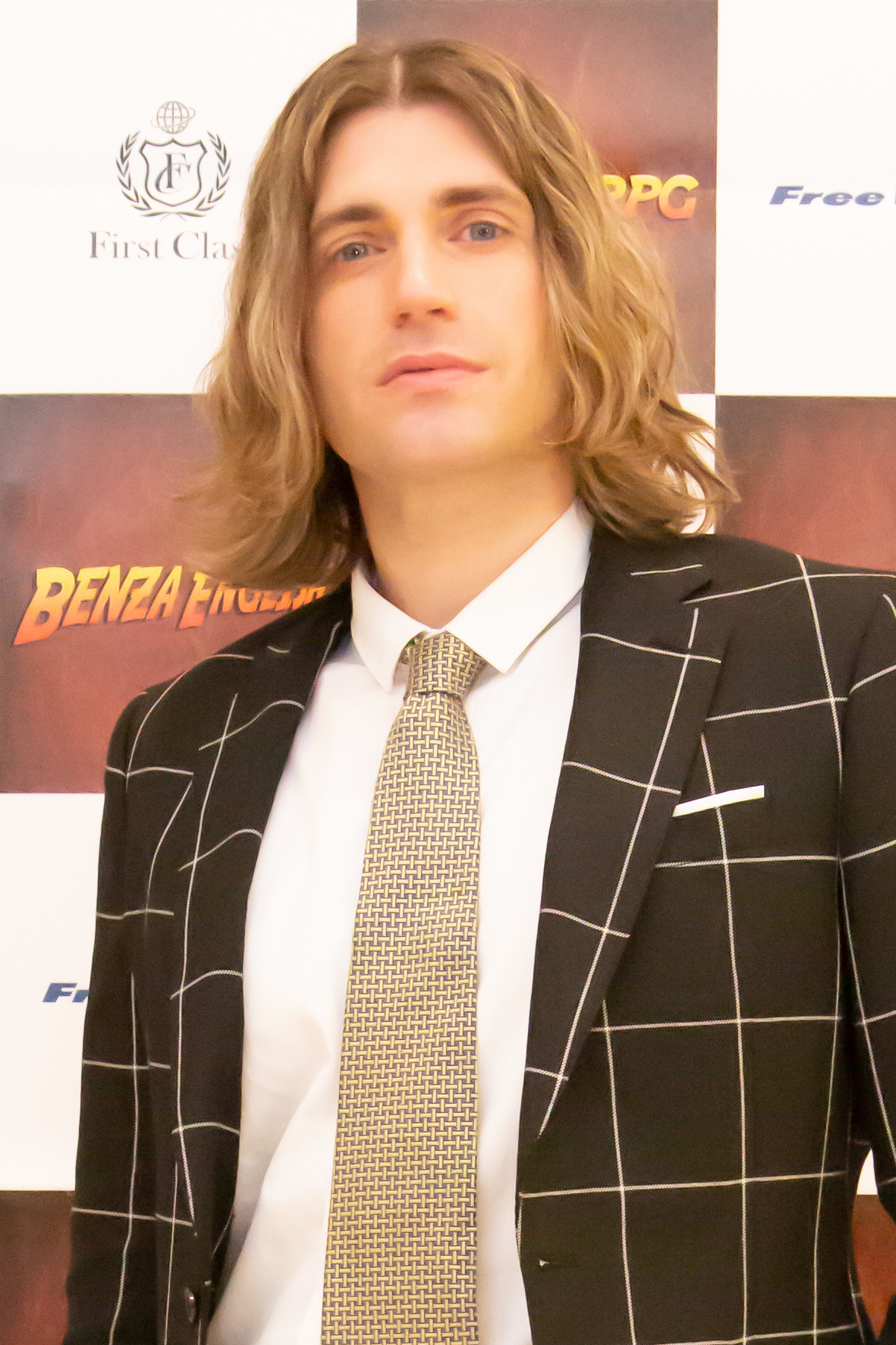
- Born: Christopher Brian McCombs; 25 August 1980 (age 46); Geneva, Ohio, U.S.
- Education: College of Southern Nevada
- Occupations: Actor, model, writer
- Years active: 1995–present
- Notable work: Aichaku; The Benza; Getting Dirty in Japan
- Parent(s): Karen Callahan; David McCombs
- Relatives: Matthew McCombs (brother)

Christopher Brian McCombs (born 25 August 1980) is an American actor, producer, writer, and television presenter based in Japan, known for his bilingual work in Japanese and English media. He is the creator, co-writer, producer, and star of the Amazon Prime Video series The Benza and its spin-off Benza English, and executive produced and appeared in the travel series Getting Dirty in Japan. He additionally co-wrote, produced, and starred in the feature film Aichaku. He is also known for his work on Japanese television, including regular appearances on NHK Educational TV programs and TV Asahi’s Kodawari Navi, as well as for portraying Hoteye in the stage adaptation of Fairy Tail. McCombs has received acting awards at international film festivals including the Formosa International Film Festival in Taiwan.

== Early life ==
McCombs was born in Geneva, Ohio, and moved to Cleveland with his mother, teacher Karen Callahan, at a young age. From childhood, he began performing in local church shows and plays. In middle school, he was encouraged to join a high school production of a musical by a director he had worked with as a child. He began acting and modeling professionally at the age of fifteen while still in high school, after his gifted education teacher urged him to audition. He started touring with a theater troupe at the same age and described this time as "probably the most informative experience of my young life."

He credits his father, David McCombs, for his interest in the Japanese language. When he was a child, his father purchased a Super Famicom for him and his brother Matthew, which led McCombs to play video games in Japanese, including Final Fantasy V and Trials of Mana. This early exposure later motivated him to study the language formally, a pursuit he described as “a form of childhood wish fulfillment.”

== Career ==
McCombs continued modeling in Las Vegas, Nevada and has stated that he used his modeling income to study Japanese, initially with a private tutor before enrolling at the College of Southern Nevada and the University of Las Vegas. About a year into his studies, a magazine he had modeled for offered him work as a reporter in Tokyo, Japan where basic Japanese skills were required. After a week in Japan, he realized he could build a career there and quickly secured agency representation. He relocated permanently in 2010 and soon transitioned to television, securing a regular role on MX Television's Go Ji Ni Muchu in 2012–2013. He became a familiar face on NHK Educational programs, appearing on EiEiGo!, Shigoto no Kiso Eigo, and Omotenashi no Kiso Eigo.

In 2016, McCombs appeared in both Chinese and Japanese stage productions of Fairy Tail, playing Hoteye. He also maintained a successful modeling career in Japan, featuring in magazines like Rolling Stone Japan, GQ Japan, and ELLE, and working for brands such as Tommy Hilfiger and Houston.

From 2015 onward, he expanded his presence in entertainment, appearing in stage musicals, drama CDs, and voice work in commercials, even charting on Billboard Japan as a voice actor.

From 2017, McCombs hosted Television Asahi’s Kodawari Navi weekly and frequently appeared on NHK1’s Bento Expo. He also reported for NHK World’s JTrip Japan.

In 2020, he joined Nippon TV’s morning show ZIP! and continued appearances on NHK Educational programs including Onishi Hiroto’s Basic English Recipes and English Conversation Feelinglish!.

In the streaming space, McCombs played Michael in Netflix’s original series Followers (2020). He also created and stars in the Amazon Prime Video series The Benza (2019) and its spin-off Benza English (2020), both of which he co-writes and produces. In 2021, he expanded into gaming with the release of The Benza RPG, for which he wrote the story and dialogue.

In 2023, McCombs executive produced and appeared in the Amazon Prime Video travel series Getting Dirty in Japan, which explores outdoor adventure and local culture in Japan.

In 2024, he co-wrote, produced, and starred in his feature film debut, the gay romance drama Aichaku which was released in April of 2025 on Amazon Prime Video in Japan.

In 2026, McCombs appeared as a presenter and model in Japanese watch manufacturer Seiko’s “The Presage Museum” project, an online series exploring Japanese aesthetics and traditional arts connected to the Presage watch line. As part of the project, he interviewed Japanese calligrapher Goshow in a feature examining Japanese calligraphy, craftsmanship, and design philosophy.

McCombs has also written lyrics for songs used in Tokyo Cowboys productions, including "Waiting to Be Seen", the theme song for Getting Dirty in Japan, and "A Feeling I Get" from the soundtrack of Aichaku. "Waiting to Be Seen" and "A Feeling I Get" peaked at numbers five and four respectively on the Japanese iTunes soundtrack songs chart.

McCombs is currently represented in Japan by Free Wave Co., Ltd.

=== Tokyo Cowboys ===
In 2015, McCombs founded the Tokyo-based independent production company Tokyo Cowboys with the aim of creating more inclusive and representative roles for both foreign and Japanese performers in Japanese entertainment, regardless of race, gender, or sexual orientation. McCombs serves as both producer and head scriptwriter for the company.

Initially focused on short films—such as the award-winning LGBT short The Actor and the Model— Tokyo Cowboys expanded into serialized content in 2019 with the launch of The Benza on Amazon Prime Video, followed by its spin-off series Benza English. In 2023, McCombs executive produced and appeared in the company’s first non-narrative streaming series, Getting Dirty in Japan, also released via Amazon Prime Video Japan. Tokyo Cowboys’ first feature film, Aichaku, was released in 2025.

In a 2025 interview, McCombs described the production team as “a network of entertainers from all over the world based out of Tokyo.” He explained that Tokyo Cowboys aims to create entertainment that reflects the diversity within Japan while also honoring its culture and traditions. “Tokyo Cowboys is an idea,” he said. “It is a suggestion of how Japanese and foreign entertainers can work together to create something distinct.” He emphasized the company's desire to make viewers feel welcome, regardless of where they're watching from.

== Filmography ==
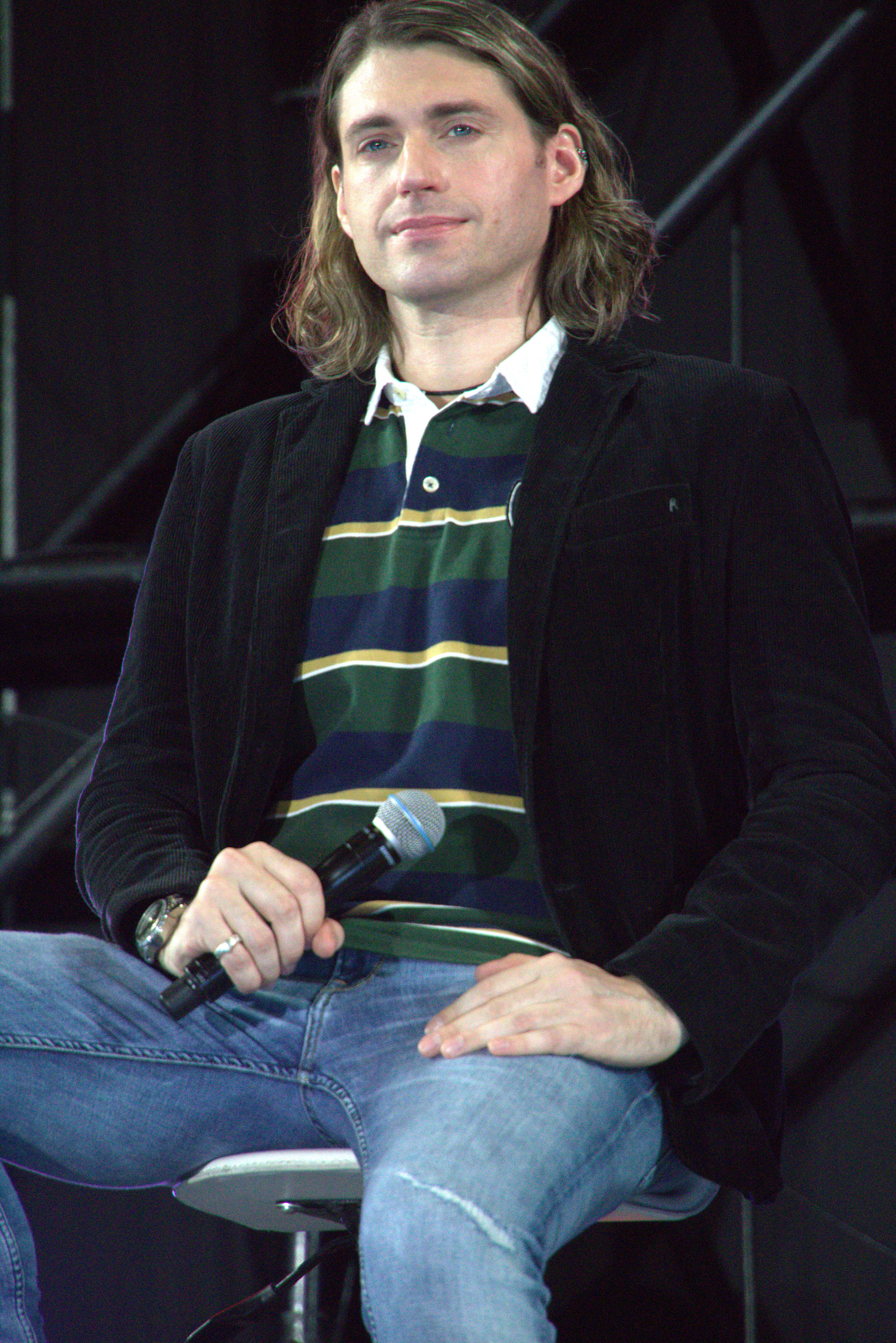
Christopher McCombs at Tokyo Comic Con 2022

=== Television ===
Year	Title	Role	Notes	Ref(s)
2012	Gojinimuchuu (五時に夢中)	Self	Reporter	
2015	EieiGo! (エイエイGo)	Various Roles		
2016	Watashi no Uchi ni wa, Nan'nimo Nai (わたしのウチには、なんにもない)	Purse		
2017	Shigoto No Kiso Eigo (仕事の基礎英語)	Various Roles		
2017–2025	Kodawari Navi (こだわりナビ)	DJ Chris	Presenter	
2018	Omotenashi No Kiso Eigo (おもてなしの基礎英語)	Matthew		
2018	Tokyo Eye 2020 (Hands-on Fun in Asakusa)	Self		
2019–2023	Bento Expo	Self	Studio commentator	
2019–present	The Benza	Chris	Creator and producer	
2020	Benza English	Chris	Creator and producer	
2020	Followers	Michael		
2021–2023	Onishi Hiroto's Basic English Recipe (大西泰斗の英会話☆定番レシピ)	Self	Studio commentator	
2023–present	Getting Dirty in Japan (ゲッティング・ダーティ・イン・ジャパン)	Self	Reporter and executive producer	
2023–2025	English Conversation Feelinglish (英会話フィーリングリッシュ)	Paul		
2024	Legendary Games Chronicle: Final Fantasy	Self	Narrator	
2025	Aidma no Hōsoku (アイドマの法則)	Chris	Presenter	
2025	Dive in Tokyo (Gotanda – An Eclectic Town of Hills and Valleys)	Self	Reporter	

=== Film ===
Year	Title	Role	Notes	Ref(s)
2013	The Secret-Sharer (カサブランカの探偵)	Alfred		
2014	Miracle: Devil Claus' Love and Magic	Carlos		
2015	Nagasaki: Memories of My Son	Charles Sweeney		
2016	Live Fantasy Fairy Tail	Hoteye		
2024	Aichaku	Lucas		
2025	Peleliu: Guernica of Paradise	Soldier	Voice	

=== Music Videos ===
Year	Artist	Title	Notes
2010	RHYMESTER	"Walk This Way"	
2010	ViViD	"Across The Border"	
2010	FTISLAND	"Brand-new days"	
2011	AISHA	"I Wanna Rock You"	
2011	Kylee	"NEVER GIVE UP!"	
2011	lecca	"Familia!" (ファミリア！)	
2011	DJ MAKIDAI feat. Happiness	"Really Into You"	
2011	Unicorn	"Pig Pig (Butabuta)" (ぶたぶた)	
2011	ONE OK ROCK	"NO SCARED"	
2012	Crystal Kay	"Delicious Friday" (デリシャスな金曜日)	
2012	Namie Amuro	"Hot Girls"	
2013	Hiromi	"Lucky☆Girl" (ラッキー☆ガール 〜恋のLA・LA・LA〜)	
2014	Sandaime J Soul Brothers from EXILE TRIBE	"C.O.S.M.O.S. ~Cosmos~" (C.O.S.M.O.S. 〜秋桜〜)	
2016	JESSE and The BONEZ	"To a Person That May Save Someone"	
2017	Edge of Blacksmiths	"Remnant of the War"	
2017	GALNERYUS	"Ultimate Sacrifice"	
2019	The Lethal Weapons	"Hoppy de Happy" (ホッピーでハッピー)	

=== Video games ===
Year	Title	Role	Notes	Ref(s)
2021	The Benza RPG	Chris	Writer	

=== Theater ===
Year	Production	Theater	Role	Ref(s)
2016	Fairy Tail	Sunshine Theater	Hoteye	

== Reception ==
McCombs's work as an actor, writer, and producer has attracted attention in both Japanese and international media. Writing about The Benza, Soranews24 praised the series for drawing humor from McCombs's real-life experiences as a foreigner in Tokyo, noting that it was inspired by everyday encounters such as “navigating Shinjuku Station and communication mix-ups at cafés”. Model Bible highlighted that, beyond comedy, McCombs produced the series to challenge stereotypes about foreigners in Japanese media, remarking that the show “actively works to shift perceptions of what foreign actors can represent on screen”.

The Benza RPG, written entirely by McCombs, earned praise for its accessible yet humor-driven design. SoraNews24 noted that “a ton of subtle and not-so-subtle jokes” are embedded throughout the characters’ dialogue, ensuring that “you’ll have plenty of laughs along the way.” Tokyo Weekender similarly remarked: “Just as the show wants to be a place where people can come together to share a laugh, the game has been created so that all gamers, be they beginner or veteran, can pick up and enjoy this turn-based RPG.” Writing for Pocket Gamer, Cameron Bald praised the project's charm and humor, describing it as “a very solid turn-based JRPG with an over-the-top hilarious story that is sure to get a few laughs out of you throughout its runtime.”

His work on the travel program Getting Dirty in Japan, co-hosted with Janni Olsson, also received notice for presenting Japan's outdoors in an accessible and humorous way while spotlighting cultural and environmental themes.

McCombs's work in the feature film Aichaku also received critical attention. Italy's Taxidrivers called Aichaku “a love story … very sweet and tender” (una storia d'amore ... molto dolce e tenera) and praised the performances, writing: “The two actors played their roles very well … making them seem real” (I due attori hanno interpretato benissimo i loro ruoli ... facendoli sembrare reali). The article also highlighted moments where McCombs's character, a foreigner in rural Japan, “even feels dehumanized … they treat Lucas like an animal in a zoo” (si sente persino disumanizzato ... trattano Lucas come se fosse una sorta di animale in uno zoo). Similarly, Shangay highlighted that the film “manages to present emotional and complex relationships with sensitivity” (“logra presentar relaciones emocionales y complejas con sensibilidad”).

== Awards ==
Able to perform in both Japanese and English, McCombs has won several awards for his acting. Most notably, he won Best Actor for his role in the Japanese short film The Actor and the Model at Formosa Festival of International Film in Taiwan as well as the Rising Star award at the 2018 Seoul Webfest in Korea and the Best Actor award at the 2019 edition for his leading role in the television series The Benza.
