= Followers (TV series) =

Japanese series

- Genre: J-Drama
- Directed by: Mika Ninagawa
- Starring: Miki Nakatani; Elaiza Ikeda; Mari Natsuki; Yuka Itaya; KOM_I; Mika Nakashima; Tadanobu Asano; Shuhei Uesugi; Nobuaki Kaneko; Hidekazu Mashima; Show Kasamatsu; Yutaro
- Country of origin: Japan
- Original language: Japanese
- No. of seasons: 1
- No. of episodes: 9

Production
- Camera setup: Single-camera

Original release
- Network: Netflix
- Release: February 27, 2020

Followers is a Japanese J-Drama television series and the first drama series by the director Mika Ninagawa. The series premiered on Netflix on February 27, 2020.

== Plot ==
The series revolves around the pulsating capital of Tokyo with all its life, colors, fashion and ambition as well as the fascinating lifestyle of the women living there. Limi Nara is a famous and successful fashion photographer who has advanced her career with photographs of modern Tokyo, capturing the changes in the city and its people. She leads a confident and independent life both privately and professionally. In contrast to her is the young actress Natsume Hyakuta, who is constantly having problems in her private and professional life in search of self-confidence and her own identity.

But that changes suddenly one day when Limi publishes a photograph of Natsume on Instagram. Natsume's life and that of those around her collide in blooming Tokyo as they try to defend their standing and status while following their hearts, dreams and social networks. All of these women are trying to find their own way to happiness and love.

== Cast and characters ==
- Miki Nakatani as Limi Nara
- Elaiza Ikeda as Natsume Hyakuta
- Mari Natsuki as Eriko Tajima
- Yuka Itaya as Akane Gunjyo
- KOM_I as Sunny
- Yutaro as Nori
- Mika Nakashima as Sayo
- Tadanobu Asano as Tamio Mochizuki
- Shuhei Uesugi as Hiraku Noma
- Nobuaki Kaneko as Yuruco
- Hidekazu Mashima as Hiroshi Wada
- Show Kasamatsu as Sueo
- Tomoya Oku as Rui Tajima
- Aki Yashiro as Yoko
- Christopher McCombs as Michael

A number of Japanese and South Korean media figures also make cameos as themselves, including Daoko, I.M, Hiroyuki Igarashi, Hyungwon, Joohoney, Don Kashima, Kihyun, Minhyuk, Miyavi, Kiko Mizuhara, Rola, Ryo Ryusei, Erika Sawajiri, Shownu, Tina Tamashiro, Hiroshi Tanahashi, Anna Tsuchiya, Naomi Watanabe, and Yu Yamada.

== Episodes ==
No.	Title	Directed by	Written by	Original release date
1	"Hashtag"	Mika Ninagawa	Yuri Kanchiku & Kouta Ooura & Mika Ninagawa	February 27, 2020
2	"Login"	Mika Ninagawa	Yuri Kanchiku & Kouta Ooura & Mika Ninagawa	February 27, 2020
3	"Search"	Mika Ninagawa	Yuri Kanchiku & Kouta Ooura & Mika Ninagawa	February 27, 2020
4	"Flaming"	Mika Ninagawa	Yuri Kanchiku & Kouta Ooura & Mika Ninagawa	February 27, 2020
5	"Bug"	Mika Ninagawa	Yuri Kanchiku & Kouta Ooura & Mika Ninagawa	February 27, 2020
6	"Freeze"	Mika Ninagawa	Yuri Kanchiku & Kouta Ooura & Mika Ninagawa	February 27, 2020
7	"Favorite"	Mika Ninagawa	Yuri Kanchiku & Kouta Ooura & Mika Ninagawa	February 27, 2020
8	"Reboot"	Mika Ninagawa	Yuri Kanchiku & Kouta Ooura & Mika Ninagawa	February 27, 2020
9	"Follower"	Mika Ninagawa	Yuri Kanchiku & Kouta Ooura & Mika Ninagawa	February 27, 2020
