= Shizuka Anderson =

Canadian-Japanese actress and TV presenter

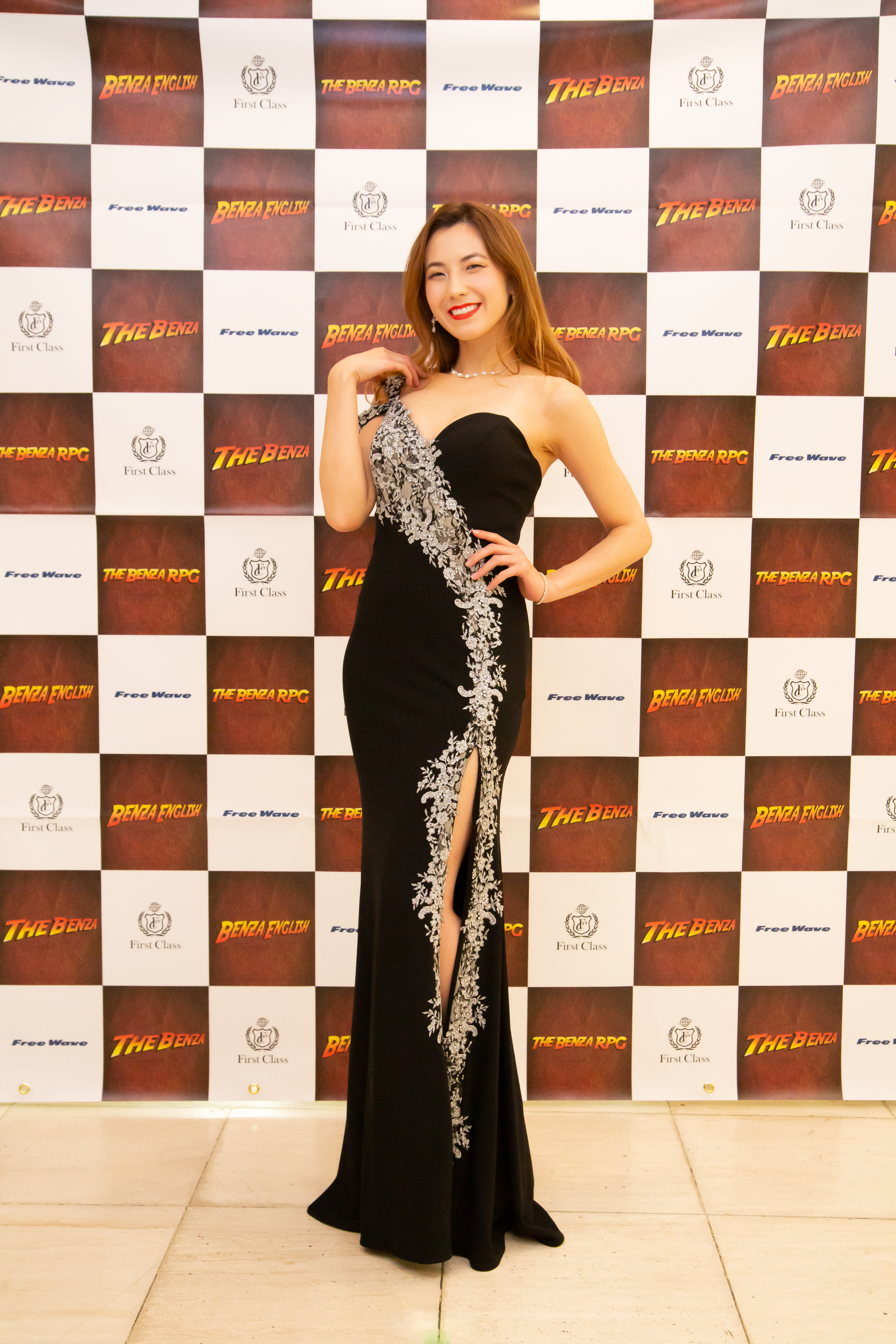
- Born: Shizuka Rachel Anderson; 30 October 1991 (age 34); Edmonton, Canada
- Education: Sophia University
- Occupations: Actress, Model, Television Presenter

Shizuka Anderson (born 30 October 1991) is a Canadian-Japanese actress, television presenter, and model. Anderson starred in the role of Pipon on the Japanese children's television program, Piponza ABC!, and later appeared in the same role on the BBC spin-off series, Eigo no Ohanashi CBeebies. She is also known for playing the role of Carol on the Amazon Prime Video series, Benza English and The Benza. She has hosted and reported for the NHK World television programs J-Flicks and Journeys in Japan.

Anderson was a finalist in the 2020 Miss World Japan beauty pageant and won the title of "Japan Traditional Culture".

== Early life ==
Anderson was born in Edmonton, Canada. Her father is Canadian and her mother is Japanese. She lived in Canada until the age of 18, when she moved to Japan for university at the suggestion of her grandparents. Anderson studied in the Faculty of Liberal Arts at Sophia University.

== Career ==
Anderson made her television debut in 2012 as the title character of the Kids Station television series, Piponza ABC. She performed as the same character in a concert series with characters from other Kids Station children's programs and later co-starred with Gota Watabe in the BBC spin-off, Eigo no Ohanashi CBeebies, which also aired on Kids Station. She made a return to acting in 2020 in the recurring role of Carol in the Amazon Prime Video Series The Benza and Benza English. She additionally voiced her character Carol in the video game adaption, The Benza RPG.

Anderson has additionally worked as a reporter and television show host. She co-hosted Tokyo Extra, a television program that aired live on TBS and YouTube, with Marty Friedman. She has additionally hosted YouTube videos for Tokyo Creative, Best Ever Food Review Show, and Rock Fujiyama. Anderson has also made appearances on NHK World, reporting on episodes of Journeys in Japan and as the host of J-Flicks.

In addition to television, Anderson co-hosted the educational NHK Radio 2 program, “Kōkōkōza Communication Eigo II” where she performed under her middle name, Rachel.

Anderson was selected as a Miss World Japan Finalist in 2020 and won the Japan Traditional Culture title at the competition.

In 2021, Anderson was featured on The Today Show with Hoda Kotb and Jenna Bush Hager in a segment introducing Tokyo leading up to the Tokyo Olympics. She currently works as an ambassador for “EAT! MEET! JAPAN” and is the host of a Youtube channel called Japan by Food.

== Filmography ==
=== Television ===
Year	Title	Role	Notes	Ref(s)
2012	Piponza ABC	Pipon		
2012	Eigo No O Hanashi CBeebies	Pipon		
2015	Tokyo Extra	Self	Host	
2019–present	Journeys in Japan	Self	Reporter	
2019	J-Flicks	Self	Host	
2020	Benza English	Carol		
2020–present	The Benza	Carol		

=== Video games ===
Year	Title	Role	Notes	Ref(s)
2022	The Benza RPG	Carol		

=== YouTube ===
Year	Title	Role	Notes	Ref(s)
2019–present	Japan by Food	Hostess		
