= Al Hunter (American football) =

American football player (born 1955)

No. 24
- Position: Running back

Personal information
- Born: February 21, 1955 (age 71); Greenville, North Carolina, U.S.
- Listed height: 5 ft 11 in (1.80 m)
- Listed weight: 195 lb (88 kg)

Career information
- High school: J.H. Rose (Greenville)
- College: Notre Dame
- Supplemental draft: 1977: 4th round

Career history
- Seattle Seahawks (1977–1980)

Awards and highlights
- National champion (1973)

Career NFL statistics
- Rushing attempts: 180
- Rushing yards: 715
- Rushing average: 4
- Rushing touchdowns: 4
- Receptions: 27
- Receiving yards: 331
- Stats at Pro Football Reference

Alfonse Hunter (born February 21, 1955) is an American former professional football player who was a running back who played four seasons for the Seattle Seahawks of the National Football League (NFL) from 1977 to 1980. Hunter played high school football at Junius H. Rose High School in North Carolina before playing collegiately for the Notre Dame Fighting Irish, who was the national championship in 1973. Hunter was the first player selected in an NFL supplemental draft.

== Personal life ==
Hunter settled in the Pacific Northwest with his wife and three children including American actor and model Alexander W. Hunter.
