= The Benza RPG =

2020 video game

- Developer: Guilherme Martins
- Publisher: Tokyo Cowboys
- Director: Guilherme Martins
- Producer: Christopher McCombs
- Programmers: Guilherme Martins; Christopher McCombs
- Artists: Raito Nishizaka; Aver Hamilton II; Caterina Rocchi; Iris Benoit
- Writer: Christopher McCombs
- Composers: Takahiro Nomiya; Yonamine Akinori; Marcus L-Spade Johnson
- Engine: RPG Maker MV
- Platforms: Microsoft Windows macOS; Android (operating system) iOS
- Release: iOS; October 1, 2020; Windows and Mac; November 1, 2020; Android; November 12, 2020
- Genre: Role-playing
- Mode: Single-player

The Benza RPG is a 2020 role-playing video game that takes place in the world of the Japanese on demand comedy series The Benza and its spin-off series Benza English. It was released in 148 countries via the iOS app store and shortly after on Steam and Android devices. The plot takes place between Benza English and the second series of The Benza. The story and dialog were entirely written by series creator Christopher McCombs.

== Gameplay ==
The player primarily takes control of Chris and Kyle as they explore a retro-rpg version of Higashi Nakano. Many locations and characters from The Benza and Benza English are featured within the game. Gameplay is divided between story, battle, and exploration. The combat system is turn based and features an on screen turn counter. The player also has the ability to swap characters in and out of battle at any time via the “Switch” battle command.

== Plot ==
Chris (Christopher McCombs) and Kyle (Kyle Card) are about to head to the set for their first day of work on series 2 of The Benza when Inko Sensei (Haku Inko) appears. She uses a dark magic to turn all of Higashi Nakano into a retro RPG and kidnaps Lee. Chris and Kyle must battle through fifty floors of their Japanese school with their friends Alena (Janni Olsson), Stephanie (Hannah Grace), David (Alexander W. Hunter), and more to put a stop to Inko Sensei's evil plan.

== Development ==
The Benza RPG was developed by indie game creator Guilherme Martins in collaboration with The Benza and Benza English’s production company Tokyo Cowboys. Development began in 2020. The Benza director Raito Nishizaka and cast member Aver Hamilton II (Hamilton) provided original art work along with Italian manga artist Caterina Rocchi and French artist Iris Benoit.

Series creator Christopher McCombs provided the story and the game dialog. He is quoted on the gaming news site TheGG as saying, “We realized while making series one in 2018 that The Benza and its world were perfect to turn into a video game.”

The game was formally announced in an article about Benza English on SoraNews by Christopher in June 2020.

Though initially released only with English language support, The Benza RPG was updated with Japanese language support and translation in June 2021.

== Musical score ==
Twenty nine original songs were created for “The Benza RPG” by various artists, including Marcus L Spade Johnson and Yonamine Akinori. The Benza and Benza English Sound Producer - Takahiro Nomiya - oversaw sound production of the game. Six of the songs on the soundtrack were performed by the main cast.

== Cast ==
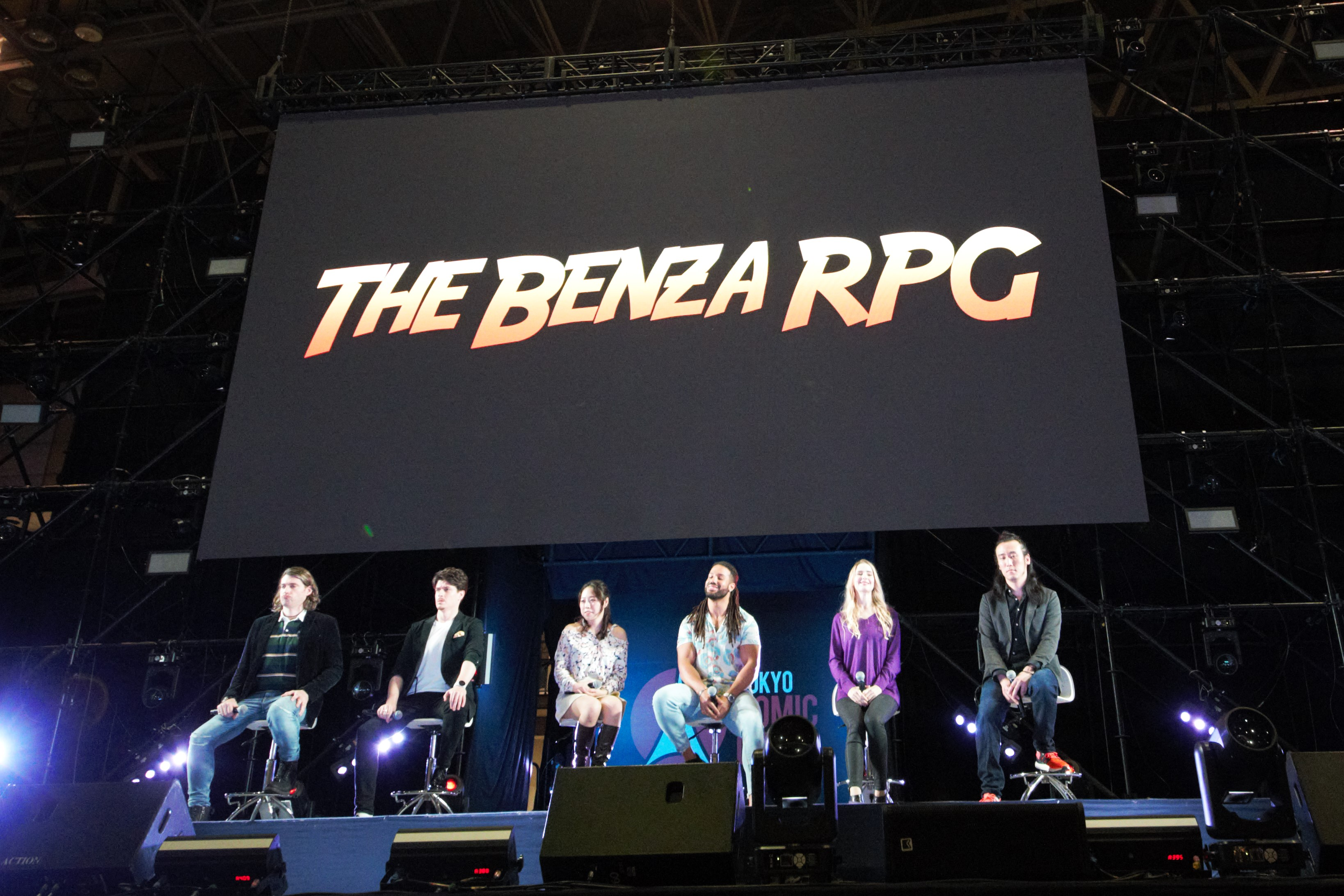
The Benza RPG at Tokyo Comic Con 2022

The main cast from the original series The Benza returned to provide voice acting for The Benza RPG. Over 280 original lines of dialog were recorded for the game.

- Christopher McCombs as Chris
- Kyle Card as Kyle
- Haku Inko as Inko Sensei
- Michiko Noguchi as Za
- Masahito Kawahata as Tamura
- Hannah Grace as Stephanie
- Alexander W. Hunter as David
- Janni Olsson as Alena
- Kaori Ikeda as Kaori
- Maria Papadopoulou as Maria
- Aver Hamilton III as Hamilton
- Min Lee Kuk as Lee
- Kosuke Imai as Kosuke
- Stuart O as Mr. O
- Christopher Nishizawa as Rebel Fairy
- Safiya Quinley as Ice Fairy
- Anya Floris as Queen's Guard
- Shayna Magnuson as Shayna
- Bob Werley as Bob
- Justin Leeper as Justin
- David Mashiko as Tomo

== Reception ==
The game has been received positively, with 4.9 stars on the Apple App Store and 5 stars on the Amazon Android App Store. The Metacritic user review score is 10. In regards to the game, pop-culture website SoraNews 24 said:

“Since this retro RPG is based on a comedy web series, there are also a ton of subtle and not-so-subtle jokes scattered throughout the characters’ dialogue. The quest is a serious one, but you'll have plenty of laughs along the way.”

Tokyo based news site Tokyo Weekender also notes:

“Just as the show wants to be a place where people can come together to share a laugh, the game has been created so that all gamers, be they beginner or veteran, can pick up and enjoy this turn-based RPG.”
