= Maxwell Powers =

American voice actor (born 1983)

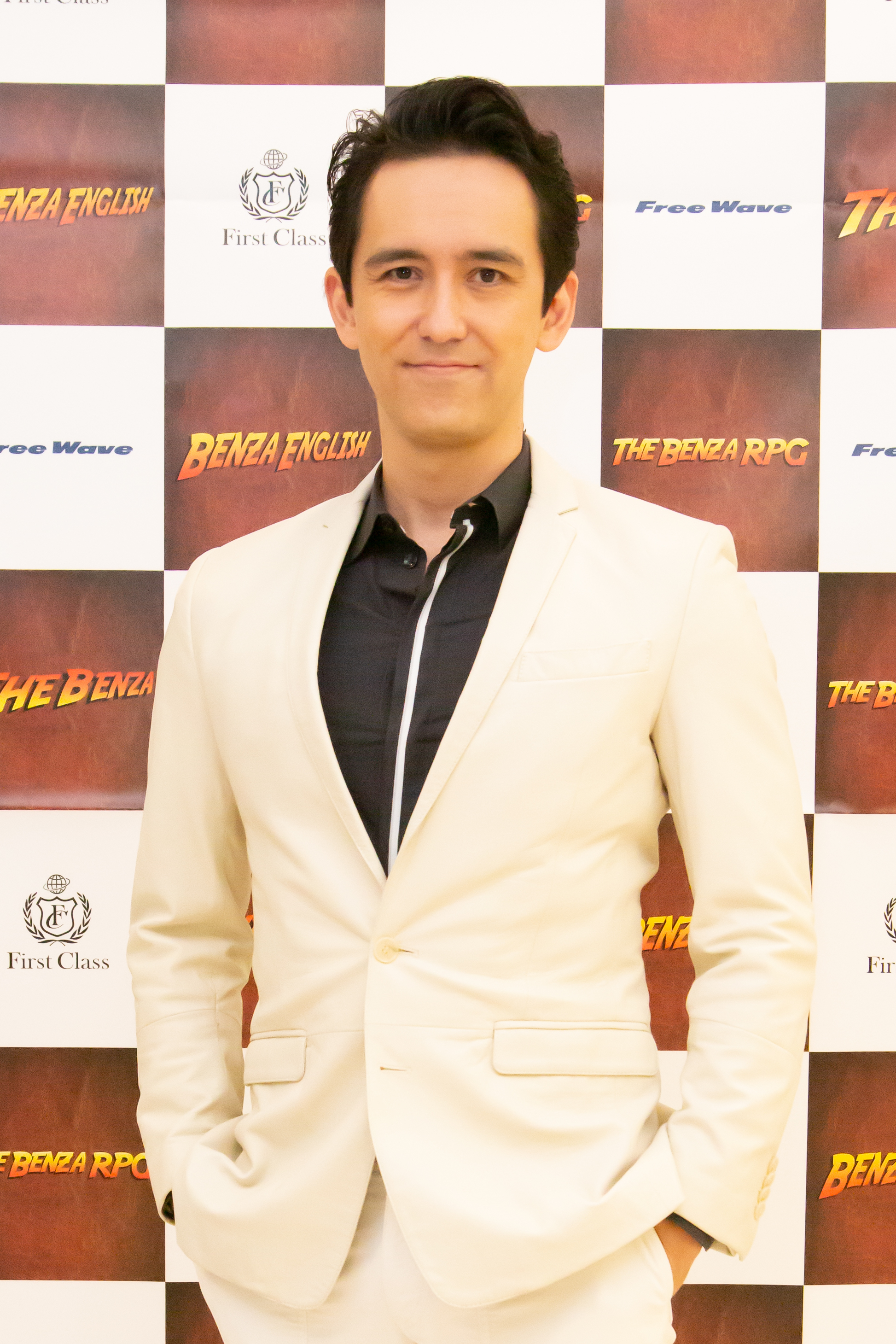
- Maxwell Powers at the premiere of The Benza Series 2
- Born: December 27, 1983 (age 42); Oakland, California, U.S.
- Occupation: Voice actor
- Years active: 2005–present
- Website: www.maxpowervoice.com

Maxwell Powers (born December 27, 1983) is an American voice actor. Known for his work in Kabaneri of the Iron Fortress, Shinkansen Henkei Robo Shinkalion, Pokémon, and Ultraman Trigger: New Generation Tiga. Powers is also known for his live action work as the host of the NHK Educational TV program VocabRider (2016–present) and as a host for NHK World-Japan's Catch Japan. Most recently, Powers was a presenter at the 2020 Paralympic Games closing ceremony.

== Early life ==
Powers began studying Japanese from the age of 15, and was awarded the Japanese Ministry of Education, Culture, Sports, Science and Technology's scholarship to attend a Japanese university in 2003. He began his professional career as a translator working in manga and anime. In 2006, Powers was hired to supervise a narrator for a recording and was requested by the director to replace the original narrator. After finishing the recording, the director encouraged Powers to pursue a career in narration and voice acting.

== Career ==
Powers was cast in NHK Educational TV’s radio program Kiso Eigo as a host from 2007 until 2014.

In 2016, he was cast as the lead in NHK Educational TV’s television series, radio show, and smartphone application VocabRider. Co-starring Wakana Aoi, Minami Hamabe, Hiyori Sakurada, Powers was responsible for providing explanations of the English language in Japanese. He has additionally worked as a reporter for NHK World's Catch Japan.

As a voice actor, he is primarily known for his work in Japanese anime and video games. Powers has played Suzuki in the television series, video game, and movie version of Kabaneri of the Iron Fortress (2016) and is the announcer in the movie Kuroko's Basketball The Movie: Last Game (2017). Powers currently voices the recurring character Rotom Drone in the television series Pokémon, Sergeant Verde Buster Gundam in SD Gundam Heroes(2021), and Genbu in the Shinkansen Henkei Robo Shinkalion anime series Shinkalion(2018), Shinkalion Z(2021) and Shinkalion the Movie(2019).

He also voices the characters of Ultraman Max and Ultraman Mebius in the live action movie Ultraman Ultra Galaxy Fight The Absolute Conspiracy(2020), and the transformation system voice in the television series Ultraman Trigger New Generation Tiga(2021).

Powers has also worked as an MC for various MMA tournaments from 2009 including World Victory Road's Sengoku Raiden Championship (SRC) and for Aniplex Online Fest. He presented onstage at the 2020 Paralympic Games closing ceremony.

In 2021, Powers joined the cast of the Amazon Prime Video on-demand series The Benza in the recurring role of Max.

== Filmography ==
=== Television ===
Year	Title	Role	Notes	Ref(s)
2009 - 2010	Gojinimuchuu (五時に夢中)	Self		
2016–Present	VocabRider	VobabRider Max	Regular	
2018–Present	Washoku World Challenge	Host/Announcer		
2019–Present	Catch Japan	Host	Regular	
2021–Present	The Benza	Max	Recurring	

List of voice acting performances in television shows
Year	Title	Role	Notes	Source
2016	Kabaneri of the Iron Fortress	Suzuki		
2016	Yo-kai Watch	Announcer Yo-kai		
2018	Shinkansen Henkei Robo Shinkalion	Genbu		
2020	Tomica Kizuna Mode Combine Earth Granner	System Voice		
2021	Pokémon	Rotom Drone		
2021	Ultraman Trigger: New Generation Tiga	Devices Voice		
2021	SD Gundam Heroes	Sergeant Verde Buster Gundam		
2025	My Hero Academia: Vigilantes	Narration		

=== Film ===
Year	Title	Role	Notes	Ref(s)
2011	Salvage Mice (サルベージマイス)	Mob Boss	Voice over	
2013	The Liar and His Lover (film) (彼女は嘘を愛しすぎてる)	Master of Ceremonies		
2017	Let's Go Jets! (チア団！)	Announcer	Voice over	
2018	Over Drive (オーバードライブ)	Race Announcer		
2021	Masquerade Night	Master of Ceremonies		

=== Video games ===
List of voice acting performances in video games
Year	Title	Role	Notes	Source
2008	Space Invaders Get Even	Various Characters		
2011	Tekken Tag Tournament 2	System Voice		
2015	Time Crisis 5	Wild Fang		
2016	The King of Fighters XIV	Main System Voice		
2016	Mystery Chronicles: One Way Heroics	Keyton		
2018	Kotodaman	Genbu		
2019	Last Cloudia	Various Characters		
2022	The King of Fighters XV	System Voice		
2022	Azure Striker Gunvolt 3	Asimov (English version)		
2023	Little Goody Two Shoes	Gustav, Father Hans		
2024	Like a Dragon: Infinite Wealth	Dwight Méndez (Japanese version; English dialogue)		
2024	Gitadora: Galaxy Wave	System Voice		
2025	Inazuma Eleven: Victory Road	Donny Summerfield (English version), System Voice		
2026	Marvel Tōkon: Fighting Souls	Male System Voice		
