= Kyle Card =

Canadian actor

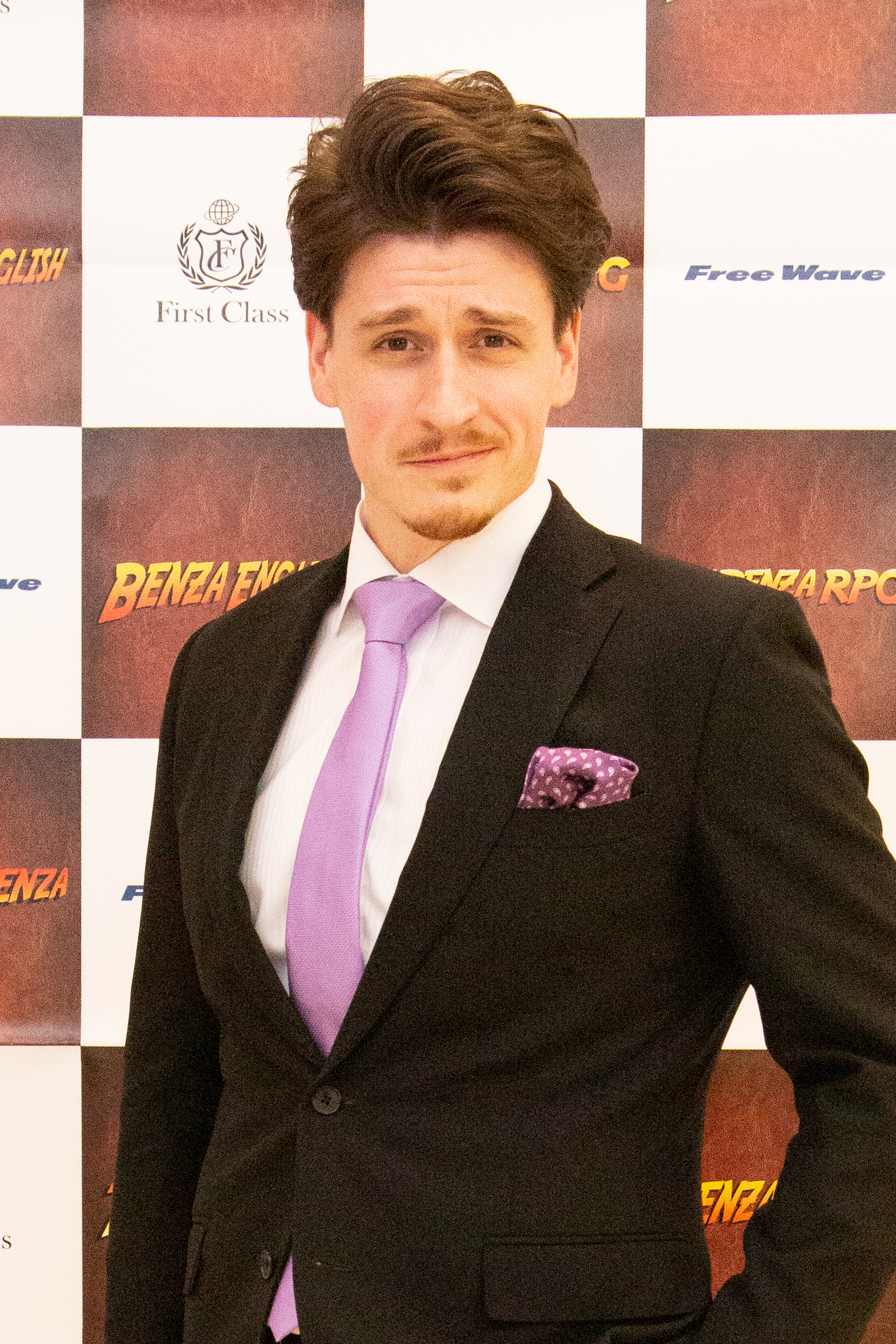
- Kyle Card at the Benza English Premiere
- Born: Kyle Lawrence Card; 27 July 1985 (age 40); British Columbia, Canada
- Occupations: Actor, television reporter
- Years active: 2011–present

Kyle Lawrence Card (born July 27, 1985) is a Canadian actor and television reporter. Card is best known for his role of Kyle in the Japanese on demand series The Benza and spin-off series Benza English on Amazon Prime Video. He also works as a reporter for multiple NHK World programs, including Journeys in Japan, Trails to Oishii Tokyo, and Tokyo Eye 2020. Card is fluent in Japanese and has won awards for his acting abilities in it.

== Early life ==
Card was born in British Columbia, Canada. From the age of six he developed an interest in Japanese culture after watching the animated film Akira on television. This led him to study the Japanese language in university. He participated in a one-year exchange program to Tokyo in 2005 when he was 20 years old.

== Career ==
Card moved back to Japan in 2011 to pursue an acting career in the Japanese entertainment industry. His first regular television job was the live news show Goji ni Muchuu! on the TokyoMX network, a position he maintained for two years. He has also worked as a reporter on the NHK World programs Journeys in Japan, Trails to Tsukiji and Tokyo Eye 2020.

Card has appeared in various video games including The Evil Within 2 and Death Stranding as a 3D motion-capture performer. As an actor, Card appeared on NHK-E Television’s EiEiGo! as a regular cast member through the show’s entire duration.

Currently, he stars as Kyle in The Benza and Benza English on Amazon Prime Video, and worked as a voice actor for the video game tie-in The Benza RPG.
