= The Benza =

Japanese web TV series

- Genre: Sitcom
- Created by: Christopher McCombs
- Directed by: Raito Nishizaka; Michael Williams
- Starring: Christopher McCombs; Kyle Card; Haku Inko; Michiko Noguchi; Masahito Kawahata; Janni Olsson; Lee Min Kuk; Alexander W. Hunter; Hannah Grace; Kaori Ikeda; Maxwell Powers
- Theme music composer: Takahiro Nomiya
- Opening theme: "The Benza Theme" by Takahiro Nomiya
- Country of origin: Japan
- Original language: Japanese
- No. of seasons: 2
- No. of episodes: 13

Production
- Executive producer: Jeff Cisneros
- Producers: Christopher McCombs; Kristi Woodward
- Production locations: Nakano, Tokyo, Japan
- Running time: 20-35 minutes
- Production company: Tokyo Cowboys

Original release
- Release: April 9, 2019

The Benza is a Japanese web television comedy that premiered on Amazon Prime Video via Prime Video Direct in April 2019 in the United States, United Kingdom, and Japan. It then premiered in Germany in July 2019. It is currently available in over 130 countries via Amazon Prime Video and Plex.

The series follows Kyle (Kyle Card) and Chris (Christopher McCombs) as they try to figure out how their toilet seat (便座, benza) broke and prevent the end of the world. The six episode first season was filmed entirely on location in Tokyo, Japan by director Raito Nishizaka. The seven episode second season was released in Japan via Amazon Prime Video in December 2021 and was directed by Raito Nishizaka and Michael Williams. The entire series was written by series creator Christopher McCombs.

== History ==
"The Benza" began as a Japanese short film that was partially inspired by true events. Pre-production began in early 2018 and the short film premiered in Tokyo, Japan on April 6 of the same year. After receiving several awards from various film festivals around the world including Best Comedy at Mediterranean Film Festival in Italy, Rising Star for main cast Christopher McCombs and Best Pilot at Seoul Web Fest in 2018, Tokyo Cowboys received an offer from Korean mobile service KT mobile to create a series based on the short film.

The first series began shooting in September 2018 and wrapped filming in mid-December. Post production continued into mid-January 2019.

The second series of The Benza held its world premiere at MCM Comic Con Birmingham in November 2021 and held its domestic premiere in Tokyo, Japan at Nakano Zero on December 11, 2021.

Series creator Christopher McCombs said on UK news site Otaku News, ""The Benza" has been in the works for over a year and I am so happy we can finally sit back and enjoy it with everyone. It's so important to take a step back and laugh so that we can get back to the important things in life. "The Benza" is the perfect way to take a break, smile, and refresh." Lead actress Haku Inko added, "We set out to make an outrageous comedy and I think we did, but it's not finished until we hear your laughter. It's such a lovely idea that people all over the world might be laughing together about "The Benza.""

== Cast ==
=== Main ===
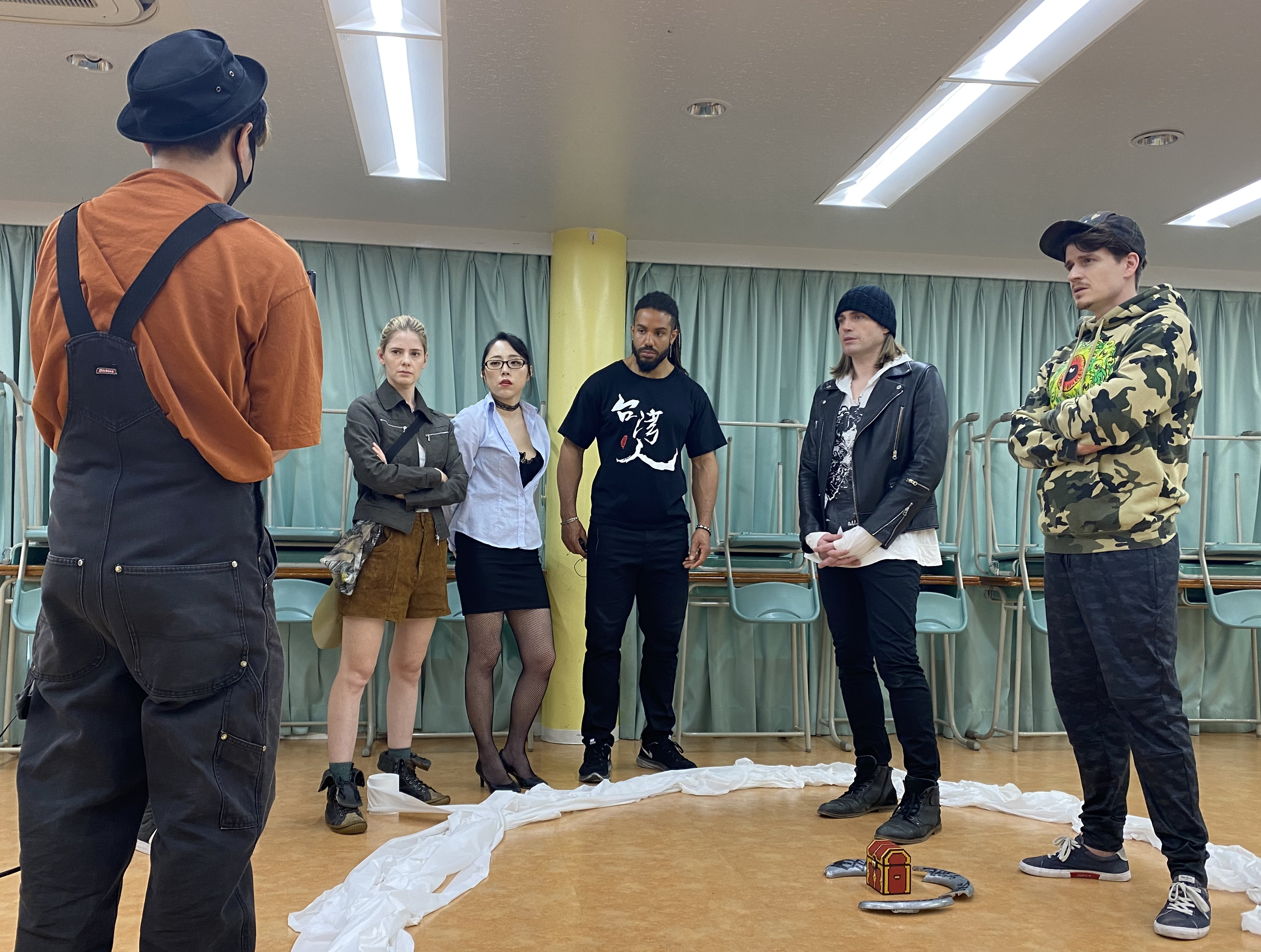
Christopher McCombs, Kyle Card, Janni Olsson, Alexander Hunter, and Haku Inko on the set of The Benza

- Kyle Card as Kyle
- Christopher McCombs as Chris
- Haku Inko as Inko-sensei
- Michiko Noguchi as Noguchi and Za
- Masahito Kawahata as Tamura
- Janni Olsson as Alena
- Lee Min Kuk as Lee
- Alexander W. Hunter as David (Season 2)
- Hannah Grace as Stephanie (Season 2)
- Kaori Ikeda as Kaori (Season 2)

=== Recurring ===
- Kosuke Imai as Kosuke
- Maria Papadopoulou as Maria (Season 2)
- Shizuka Anderson as Carol (Season 2)
- Maxwell Powers as Max (Season 2)

== Episodes ==
=== Series overview ===
Season	Episodes	Originally released	
Season	Episodes	First released	Last released
1	6	April 10, 2019	May 20, 2019
2	7	December 21, 2020	March 7, 2022

=== Season 1 (2019) ===
No. overall	No. in season	Title	Directed by	Written by	Original release date
1	1	"The Benza"	Raito Nishizaka	Christopher McCombs	April 10, 2019
Chris and Kyle wake up to find that their toilet seat is broken. After trying to figure out who might have broken the toilet seat, they realize they don't know how to say toilet seat in Japanese. They flashback to a lesson with Inko Sensei where they learn the Japanese word for toilet seat, "benza". After searching for a store that sells toilet seats unsuccessfully, they run into Noguchi San carrying one and find out that she bought it from a store called Shamito. After arriving there, Chris and Kyle succeed in find a toilet seat, but are speechless when the store staff, Tamura, asks them what kind of toilet seat they need.
2	2	"The Benza 2: Final Benza"	Raito Nishizaka	Christopher McCombs	April 11, 2019
Tamura leaves Chris and Kyle to get their toilet seat, and is attacked and left for dead. Hearing his screams, Chris and Kyle find him dying behind Shimato. He reveals that he is part of a group of people destined to protect this world from being invaded by another world called Ben, and that either Chris or Kyle is The Chosen One. Handing over a key, he asks The Chosen One to find the Final Benza and protect it. He dies before making it clear which one of them is The Chosen One. Trying to find more information about the Final Benza, Chris and Kyle arrive at Noguchi's Café and encounter Alena Treasurehunter, who insists they speak with her upon seeing the key.
3	3	"The Benza 3: Turbo Hyper Benza"	Raito Nishizaka	Christopher McCombs	April 30, 2019
Alena reveals to Chris and Kyle that she has a matching key to theirs. She is also after the Final Benza, but does not know what it is. Before leaving, she gives Kyle a magic shard. Inko Sensei listens in on their conversation and tries to get information out of Chris and Kyle via a game show. She eventually takes them to the office and explains that they need to find three magic shards that will lead to the Final Benza. Inko Sensei takes the first magic shard and leaves her office. As Chris and Kyle begin to doubt her intentions, Tamura appears as a ghost and warns them that they cannot trust one of the women that they met that day.
4	4	"The Benza 4: Championship Benza"	Raito Nishizaka	Christopher McCombs	May 7, 2019
After listening to Tamura unsuccessfully try to describe the woman that they cannot trust, Chris and Kyle begin to look for the magic shards. Chris recalls seeing one in Noguchi's Café and they decide to follow her home. Upon arriving at her apartment with Alena, they are shocked to see that her apartment is lavishly decorated in a very unusual style. After finding the second magic shard, Noguch San appears as Za and explains that she is really a prophet from another dimension living in Noguchi San's body. She tells Chris and Kyle the location of the final magic shard and warns them that she only sees one of them returning. Chris and Kyle head to the location of the final shard with Alena and Inko Sensei.
5	5	"The Benza 5: Fight For The Benza"	Raito Nishizaka	Christopher McCombs	May 15, 2019
Chris, Kyle, Alena and Inko Sensei arrive at a house that was used by refuges from Ben. A skeleton monster appears and shows them that he has the final magic shard. After splitting up to look for it, Inko Sensei manipulates Kyle into believing that he is The Chosen One. Alena reveals to Chris that they have met before and is interrupted by Inko Sensei before she can explain where. After splitting up again, Inko Sensei manipulates Chris into believing he is The Chosen One as well. Working together to capture the skeleton monster, Alena retrieves the final magic shard. They take the mask off of the skeleton monster and are shocked to see who it really is.
6	6	"The Benza 6: Grandmaster Benza"	Raito Nishizaka	Christopher McCombs	May 20, 2019
Having collected the final magic shard from Za, who was the skeleton monster, Chris, Kyle, Alena, and Inko Sensei prepare to return to Inko Sensei's office. Chris and Kyle have a large fight before leaving. Tamura appears at Za's apartment and she sends him after Chris and Kyle fearing for their safety. At Inko Sensei's office, Inko Sensei prepares the magic ritual to combine the three shards and reveals that she is actually from Ben. Chris and Kyle refuse to cooperate with her, and Alena reveals that she is actually working with Inko Sensei. Kyle still refuses to hand over the final shard and Chris decides to side with Inko Sensei and Alena. He takes the final magic shard from Kyle and combines it with the other two. To everyone's surprise, the Final Benza appears. After Alena uses her key to open it, Chris and Kyle reveal that they were only pretending to fight and were on to Inko Sensei all along. While trying to escape from Inko Sensei, they run into a narrow hallway where Chris tells Kyle that Kyle is The Chosen One and gives him the second key. Kyle escapes and Chris remains to distract Inko Sensei and is captures. Returning home, Kyle uses the second key to unlock the Final Benza and disappears.

=== Season 2 (2021) ===
No. overall	No. in season	Title	Directed by	Written by	Original release date
7	1	"The Benza 7: New Age of Benza"	Raito Nishizaka	Christopher McCombs	December 11, 2021
Chris and Kyle have disappeared from their share house. David and Stephanie look for them to no avail. After talking with Kaori, they decide to check Noguchi’s Cafe. Talking with the puppet cafe clerk - Tomo - he says he hasn’t seen either of them or Noguchi. Finding a receipt on the floor for Shimato, they go to the DIY store and find Tamura’s ghost. Chris is woken up from a dream in Inko Sensei’s office, where she tries to torture him. Alena sees this and goes to report the news to Tamura, Stephanie, David and Kaori. Meanwhile, Kyle lands in Ben and meets with Za.
8	2	"The Benza 8: Children of the Benza"	Raito Nishizaka	Christopher McCombs	December 11, 2021
Kyle and Za talk in Ben and he is tasked with finding his share house. Upon arriving, the house is completely empty and no one is around. Outside, he sees who he thinks is Stephanie, but she is actually the evil Ben counterpart of Stephanie. Surrounded by the Ben Stephanie and Ben Tamura, Kyle is knocked out and taken to the real Inko Sensei’s hideout, where he also meets the Ben equivalent of David. They are known as the openers. Ben Stephanie reveals to the Ben versions of Kaori, Alena and Chris that Kyle has arrived in their word. They are known as the closers. Inko Sensei teaches Kyle about the two different worlds. Za meets up with them and warns them that something feels off. The group are ambushed by the closers and a fight takes place. Inko sensei takes the final benza from Kyle and leaves him for dead, as the closers move in and kidnap him.
9	3	"The Benza 9: Ultimate All-Star Benza"	Michael Williams	Christopher McCombs	December 11, 2021
After class, David and Stephanie distract Inko Sensei so Alena can try to rescue Chris from her office. The plan fails as Inko Sensei comes into the office and Alena hides. Inko Sensei teaches Chris about the 5 generals of Ben. Meanwhile in Ben, Kyle is tortured by the generals. Upon Kyle revealing that he is the chosen one, Chris talks with him one on one. Kyle tells the story of the first time he met Chris and how the two refuse to speak English with each other to encourage their Japanese. Ben Chris doesn’t relent and goes off to hunt the closers. Za appears to Kyle and he asks questions about Chris’ whereabouts. Za goes between the two worlds asking questions to both Chris and Kyle. Upon returning to Ben, Mr. O appears from behind her and zaps her with electricity. Using the last of her energy, she returns to Chris and transforms back into Noguchi who has no knowledge of what has happened. Alena tries to stop Noguchi from escaping, but gets hit by Inko Sensei.
10	4	"The Benza 10: Generation Benza"	Michael Williams	Christopher McCombs	December 28, 2021
The closers enter the openers base and rescue Kyle. Upon telling them that Za has died, Inko Sensei shows no emotion. Tamura appears to David and Stephanie in the share house telling them that Noguchi, Chris and Alena have been kidnapped by Inko Sensei. Kosuke interrogates the three, but is interrupted by Maria and Max. Maria steals the key from Alena’s pocket. After Kosuke and Maria leave, Max talks with Chris. The two share a drink and are interrupted by Carol entering the room. Noguchi tries to explain the situation to Carol, but she doesn’t understand Japanese. A Benza English segment starts, where Hamilton remembers being tortured by Inko Sensei in the past. After Noguchi tells Carol in English that the three have been kidnapped by Inko Sensei, Carol runs off to get help. Max follows her, to make sure she doesn’t run into Maria. Using a sharp playing card, Alena breaks her bonds and goes to untie Chris and Noguchi. She reveals that she used to go by the name Janni and tells the story of when Chris had previously helped her after Maria had bullied her at Japanese school. Kosuke was listening to the story and decides to help them escape, in part because he feels that something has changed about Inko Sensei. Max gives Chris the encouragement to lead the group in lieu of Kyle and they confront Inko Sensei. She reveals that she wants to stay in this world. Meanwhile in Ben, the real Inko Sensei explains what would happen if the two worlds were to collide, but is interrupted by the openers.
11	5	"The Benza 11: Infinite Benza"	Michael Williams	Christopher McCombs	March 7, 2022
Inko Sensei casts a magic spell on a toilet seat so they can see a portal into Ben. The Openers and Closers face off against each other, and it’s revealed that the Openers believe that toilet seats should be left open, and the Closers believe that they should be closed. Upon hearing this, Kyle tries to open the Final Benza to go back to his world, but it won’t open. This is because Inko Sensei had closed it earlier making her the person in control of it. Back in Higashi Nakano, Inko Sensei and Kosuke discuss how to correctly use the Final Benza, but those in Ben reveal that they can hear everything being said. Ben Inko Sensei smashes the Final Benza, which opens the portal between the two worlds. After escaping, the people in Higashi Nakano split up. Alena will try and get the key back from Maria needed to restore the Final Benza. Tamura will go into Ben to find Kyle. Kaori will try and find Noguchi. David, Carol and Max will try and stop people coming through the portal. Chris will work with Inko Sensei and Kosuke to prepare the magic needed to close the Final Benza. Ben Tamura retrieves the broken Final Benza and gives it to Kyle. He is attacked by Ben Stephanie just as Tamura appears. The two Tamuras merge into Super Tamura and distract Ben Stephanie with their long hair. Kyle attacks her from behind and knocks her out. Kyle and Super Tamura escape to Higashi Nakano with Ben Chris behind them. Upon his arrival, Inko Sensei senses Ben Chris and has Kosuke return to her. She leaves Chris with her magical spell book and instructs him to finish the spell while she stops Ben Chris. Kyle appears with the broken Final Benza and works with Chris to ready the spell. As Inko Sensei battles Ben Chris on the stage, Alena successfully retrieves the key from Maria with help from Justin the Treasure Hunter from Benza English. Kaori and Noguchi are attacked by Mr. O, but Za gives Noguchi the ability to teleport. She and Kaori are able to defeat Mr. O and escape. David and the others fight to protect the school, and David saves Carol from Ben Alena with the help of Ben David. After getting the two magic keys together, Chris and Kyle are attacked by Ben Inko Sensei and saved by Max and Carol who traveled from the future using a magic bento. Chris and Kyle then use the magic keys to repair the Final Benza, sending all the people of Ben back to their world. Just as everyone begins to relax, Super Tamura announces that he wants everyone to gather on the stage as they know who was behind everything.
12	6	"The Benza 12: United By Benza"	Raito Nishizaka	Christopher McCombs	March 7, 2022
Chris, Kyle, Alena, Inko Sensei, Noguchi, Kaori, and David all gather on the stage of the school theater to wait for Tamura. He appears and tells them that he knows who killed him. He first accuses Inko Sensei, but Noguchi explains that she couldn't have done it. Tamura then accuses Noguchi, but she proves her innocence. Tamura next turns to Alena, but David proves that she couldn't be the killer. After David and Kaori each prove their innocence, it is revealed that the killer was Maria and that she has kidnapped Stephanie. She demands that they hand the Final Benza over to her within 24 hours or she will kill Stephanie and end the world.
13	7	"The Legend of the Casting of Stephanie"	Raito Nishizaka	Christopher McCombs	December 21, 2020
(Amazon of Japan exclusive episode) Za appears and begins to tell the story of how the role of Stephanie was cast. The scene changes to actress Hannah Grace receiving a phone call. She is informed that she is to audition for the part of Stephanie in a new television show called “The Benza”. She immediately heads to the audition where the audition staff, Masahito Kawahata, rapidly gives her confusing instructions. After mispronouncing her name, Janni Olsson summons Hannah to the audition room where Christopher McCombs, Kyle Card, Haku Inko and director Raito Nishizaka are waiting. Hannah is given an American flag bikini and when asked to change, she protests. Chris and the others are angry with her. Hannah asks permission to give her portrayal of how she invasions the character of Stephanie. Hannah then performs the song “Kimi No Hikari” side by side with the character Stephanie. After her audition finishes, she leaves the room dressed as Stephanie. Alexander Hunter enters after her, and everyone is convinced that he is the right actor to play Stephanie. Returning to Za narrating, the characters Chris and Kyle enter and explain that the story is incorrect and Za is twisting facts. Za scolds them for taking so long to make series 2 of “The Benza” and disappears leaving Chris and Kyle to apologize to the audience.

== Reception ==
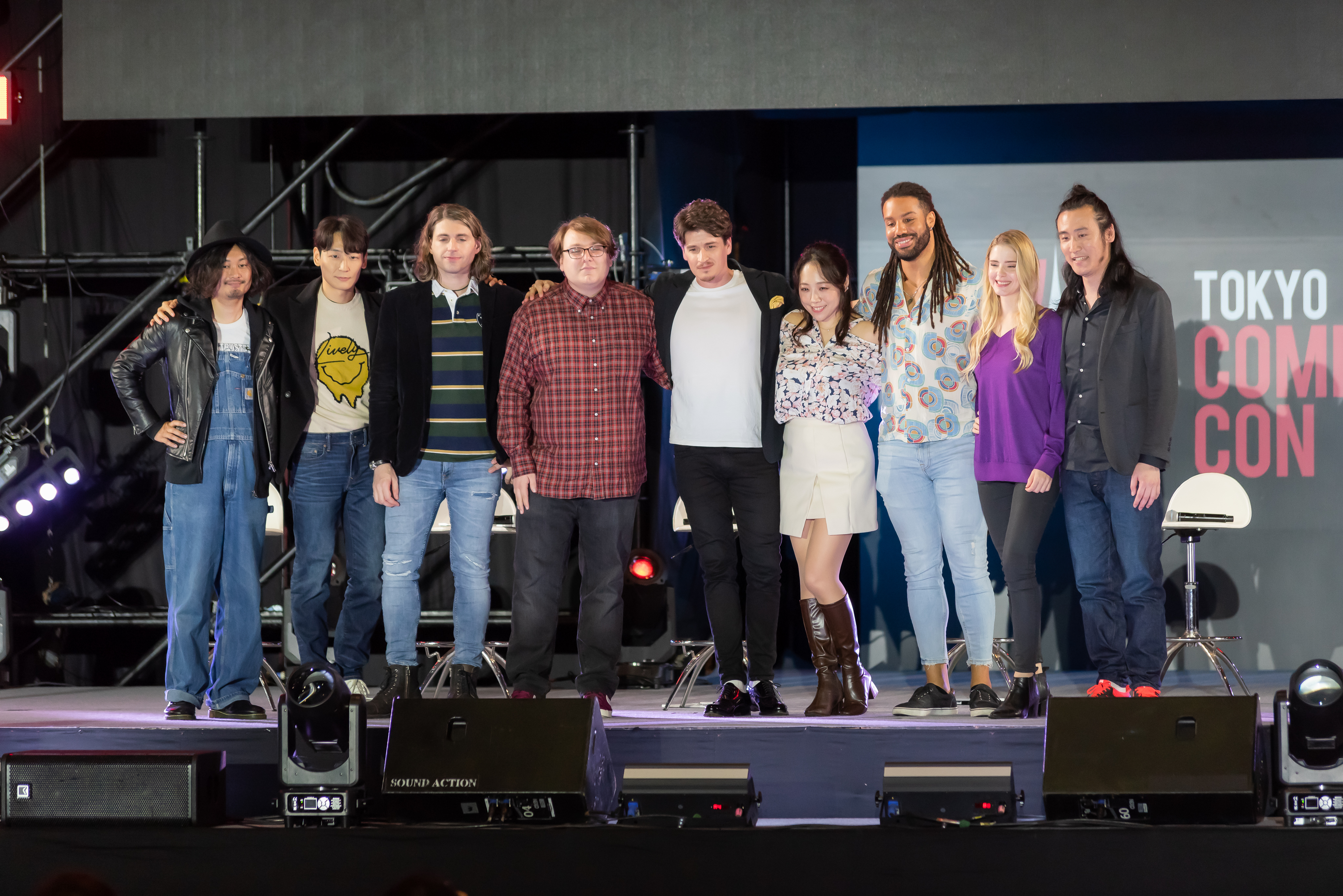
The Benza Tokyo Comic Con 2022

The Benza has been over all well received and maintains an over 4 point score on Amazon Prime Video in America, Germany, Japan, and U.K.

Sora News24 writer Master Blaster wrote, "Full of literal toilet humor and heart, this Amazon Prime series is a breath of fresh air." Master Blaster continues, "But what really stands out about The Benza is that it depicts foreigners in Japan as normal people rather than the stereotypes we are used to seeing on Japanese TV." Speaking about the international cast he says, "With a nice balance of Japanese and foreign performers, the result is a series that is able to poke fun at each other without ever being demeaning."

== Spin-Off ==
In 2019, it was announced that "The Benza" receive a spin-off series called "Benza English". Production began in late 2019, and the series was released in April 2020. The series features minor characters from "The Benza" appearing in larger roles along with the original series' main cast, and is set in an English learning television show that takes place in the world of "The Benza".

In 2020, a spin-off retro rpg video game called "The Benza RPG" was announced. It was initially released for iOS platforms in October 2020 and takes place between "Benza English" and series two of "The Benza". The player primarily plays as Chris and Kyle as they try to save Higashi Nakano from Inko Sensei and save Lee who has been kidnapped. The Benza RPG is currently available for iOS and Android devices as well as for PC and Mac via Steam in Japanese and English. Plans for a Nintendo Switch port were announced by Christopher McCombs via Steam in December 2021.

== Awards and honors ==
The following are nominations and awards that have been earned by the cast and crew of The Benza for series 1 in 2019:

Award	Category	Nominee(s)	Result
Festigious International Film Festival	Best Web Series	The Benza	Won
Festigious International Film Festival	Best Ensemble	The Benza	Won
Festigious International Film Festival	Best Song	The Benza "Running Around"	Won
Eurasia International Monthly Film Festival	Best Web Series	The Benza	Won
Seoul Webfest	Best Comedy	The Benza	Nominated
Seoul Webfest	Best Guest Star	Kaori Ikeda	Nominated
Seoul Webfest	Best Supporting Actress	Janni Olsson	Won
Seoul Webfest	Best Director	Raito Nishizaka	Nominated
Seoul Webfest	Best Actor	Christopher McCombs	Won
Seoul Webfest	Best Actress	Haku Inko	Nominated
Florence Film Awards	Best Web/Television Award	The Benza	Won
New Jersey Web Fest	Best Duo	Christopher McCombs and Kyle Card	Won
New Jersey Web Fest	Best Theme Song	The Benza	Nominated
New Jersey Web Fest	Best Fantasy Comedy	The Benza	Nominated
New Jersey Web Fest	Best Supporting Actress	Haku Inko	Nominated
Cult Critics Film Festival	Best Supporting Actor	Masahito Kawahata	Won
Asia Web Awards	Best Actor	Kyle Card	Won
International Online Webfest	Best Original Soundtrack	"The Benza" Series 1 Soundtrack, Takahiro Nomiya	Won

The following are awards that have been earned by the cast and crew of The Benza during its short film iteration in 2018:

Category	Nominee(s)	Result
Festigious 2018 Best Duo	Christopher McCombs and Kyle Card	Won
Seoul Webfest 2018 Best Rising Star	Christopher McCombs	Won
Seoul Webfes 2018 Best Pilot	The Benza	Won
Comedy World Network Int. Film Festival 2018 Best Short Film	The Benza	Won
MedFF 2018 Best Comedy	The Benza	Won
Unko Film Festival 2018 Best Picture	The Benza	Won
Asia South East-Short Film Festival 2018 Best Comedy	The Benza	Won
