= The Lethal Weapons =

Japanese rock and synthpop duo

- Origin: Japan
- Genres: rock, synthpop
- Years active: 2019–present
- Labels: Iromon Record
- Members: Cyborg Joe (サイボーグジョー); Ai-kid (アイキッド)

The Lethal Weapons (ザ・リーサルウェポンズ) is a rock/synthpop duo based in Japan, consisting of vocalist Cyborg Joe and producer-composer Ai-kid, who also plays the guitar and keyboard for the duo. Their works are largely influenced by Japanese and American music scene, films, and games from the 1980s to 1990s. They are mainly active on YouTube.

== History ==
Their first music video "80s Action Star" was uploaded on YouTube on January 26, 2019. They released their first album "Back To The 80's" digitally on April 1, 2019, which subsequently reached #19 on Oricon Japan Weekly Digital Album Ranking, as well as #43 on Billboard Japan Weekly Hot Albums chart.

== Discography ==
=== Albums ===
| Year | Album details |
|---|---|
| 2019 | Back to the 80's: Released: April 1, 2019; Label: IROMON RECORD; Format: Digital |
