= Benza English =

Japanese On Demand TV series

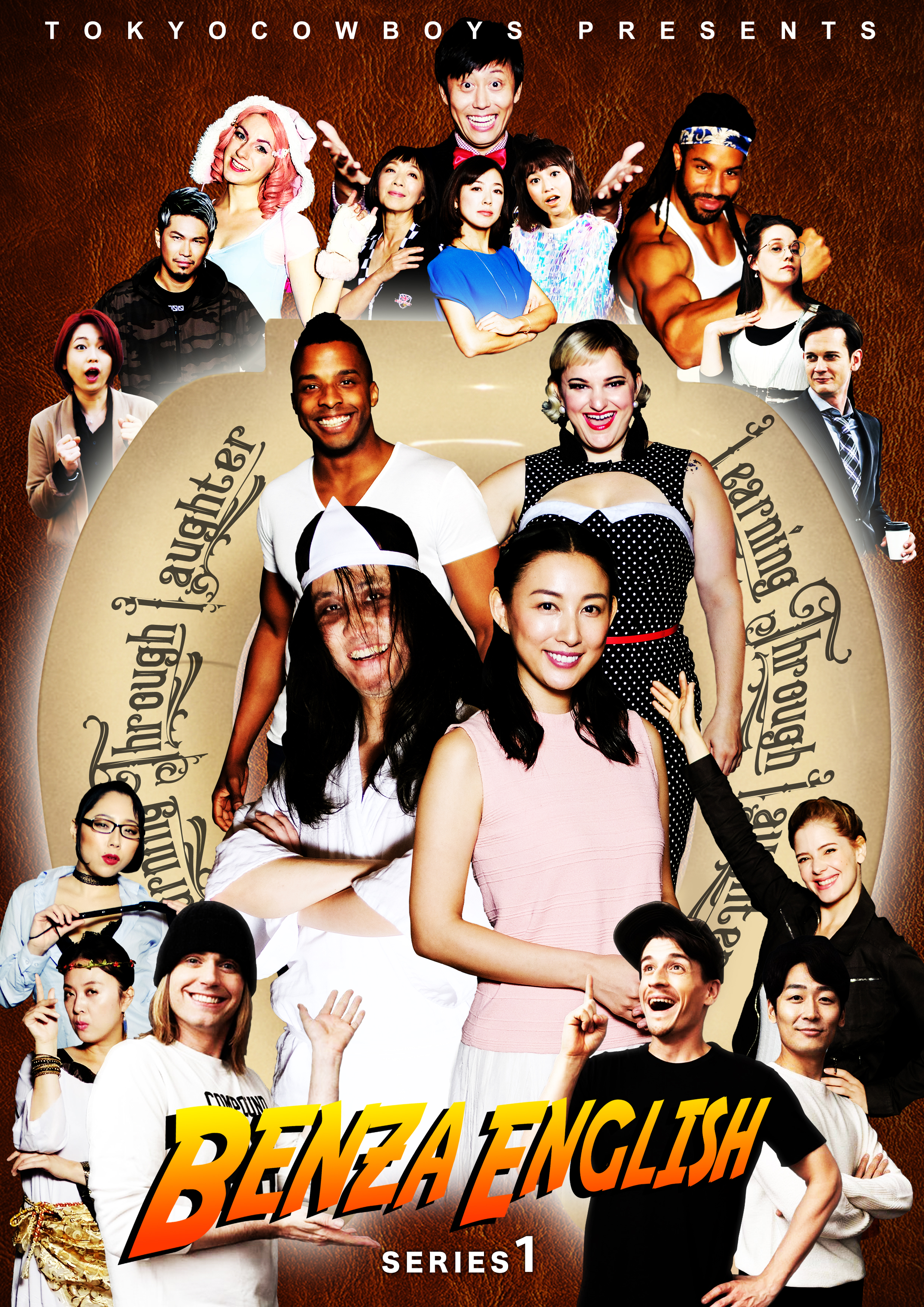
- Genre: Sitcom
- Created by: Christopher McCombs
- Directed by: Raito Nishizaka, Michael Williams
- Starring: Kaori Ikeda; Maria Papadopoulou; Aver Hamilton II; Masahito Kawahata; Christopher McCombs; Kyle Card; Haku Inko; Michiko Noguchi; Janni Olsson; Lee Min Kuk; Hannah Grace; Alexander W. Hunter
- Theme music composer: Takahiro Nomiya
- Opening theme: "Rise Above it" by Takahiro Nomiya
- Country of origin: Japan
- Original languages: Japanese, English
- No. of seasons: 1
- No. of episodes: 8

Production
- Producers: Christopher McCombs; Kristi Woodward; Haku Inko
- Production locations: Nakano, Tokyo, Japan
- Running time: 25 minutes
- Production company: Tokyo Cowboys

Original release
- Release: April 9, 2020

Benza English is a Japanese on demand comedy series that premiered on Amazon Prime Video via Prime Video Direct in April 2020 in the United States, United Kingdom, and Japan. Shortly after, it began streaming in seventy additional territories.

The show is a spin-off of the Japanese on demand comedy series The Benza, and features Kyle (Kyle Card) and Chris (Christopher McCombs) as well as many other returning characters from the original show. The main plot follows Kaori (Kaori Ikeda) who receives a mysterious offer to become the host of her own English language show and takes place between "The Benza" series 1 and series 2. The eight-episode season was filmed entirely on location in Tokyo, Japan by co-directors Raito Nishizaka and Michael Williams.

== History ==
"Benza English" began as a corner in episode 4 of series 1 of The Benza, where Kaori Ikeda appeared as the host of an English educational show that helps characters by teaching inappropriate English. The spin-off series was formally announced on the 26th of August in 2019 after Christopher McCombs won Best Actor and Janni Olsson won Best Supporting Actress for their roles of Chris and Alena respectively in the original series at Korea's Seoul Webfest.

Michael Williams was brought in to co-direct with returning director Raito Nishizaka. Talking about the experience working with Raito Nishizaka with Asia Film Festival, Michael said, "Working in tandem with Raito was perfect. With both of us directing together, "Benza English" is an unprecedented show, combining Japanese and English humor together." Actress Haku Inko (Inko Sensei) was additionally promoted to Line Producer at the start of the production.

Creator and Producer Christopher McCombs said on Japanese news site Soranews, "With "The Benza", we focused on what life in Tokyo is like for a foreigner against the backdrop of a hyper-realistic comedy. With "Benza English", we focused on the Japanese entertainment industry in general against the backdrop of a chaotic English language learning show."

== Plot ==
Kaori (Kaori Ikeda) is the host of an English language show that takes place in the world of The Benza. She is assisted by Maria (Maria Papadopoulou) and Hamilton (Aver Hamilton) who introduce English phrases. The ghost Tamura (Masahito Kawahata) occasionally appears to explain difficult grammar. Each episode focuses on a different theme and utilizes different characters from The Benza, like Inko Sensei (Haku Inko) and Alena Treasurehunter (Janni Olsson), to help introduce additional words and phrases related to the lesson. The Benza main characters Chris (Christopher McCombs) and Kyle (Kyle Card) end each episode with a recap of the lesson.

== Cast ==
- Kaori Ikeda as Kaori
- Maria Papadopoulou as Maria
- Aver Hamilton II as Hamilton
- Kyle Card as Kyle
- Christopher McCombs as Chris.
- Haku Inko as Inko-sensei.
- Michiko Noguchi as Noguchi.
- Masahito Kawahata as Tamura.
- Janni Olsson as Alena.
- Lee Min Kuk as Lee.
- Alexander W. Hunter as David.
- Hannah Grace as Stephanie.
- Shizuka Anderson as Carol.

== Episodes ==
No.	Title	Directed by	Written by	Original release date
1	"Beginnings"	Raito Nishizaka & Michael Williams	Christopher McCombs	March 20, 2020
Bob gets to an office for his first day of work, only for the Japanese staff to be confused as to why he’s there. Kaori with the help of Maria, Fanny Deep and Hiromi gives them advice as to how to get him to leave their office.
2	"Burns"	Raito Nishizaka & Michael Williams	Christopher McCombs	March 31, 2020
Things go wrong on the set of Shayna Sanpo, as Japanese actress Risa forgets her lines and is chewed out by Shayna. Kaori, Hamilton, Inko Sensei and Kosuke come up with some burns for Risa to use against Shayna.
3	"Drunk"	Raito Nishizaka & Michael Williams	Christopher McCombs	April 16, 2020
Noguchi comes across a Japanese woman - Carol - who has seemingly forgot all Japanese and can only speak English. It’s clear to her that she must be drunk. Kaori, Maria, Za and DJ Ace 1 come up with phrases Noguchi can use to help the woman get home.
4	"Fart"	Raito Nishizaka & Michael Williams	Christopher McCombs	April 16, 2020
Shooting on Shayna Sanpo gets interrupted, as a customer in a Korean restaurant farts on the host. Kaori, Maria, Fanny Deep and Hiromi help him out by making up excuses to cover up his fart.
5	"Sleep"	Raito Nishizaka & Michael Williams	Christopher McCombs	May 6, 2020
Bob is asleep at the office. Tomoko and Tatsuya try to wake him to no avail. Kaori, Hamilton, Naito and Hiro try to make English phrases to wake him up.
6	"Pick Up Lines"	Raito Nishizaka & Michael Williams	Christopher McCombs	May 6, 2020
Kaori is tricked out of the studio and tries to introduce herself to a handsome man in a cafe. Maria, Hamilton, Risa and Hiro help out from the studio creating pick up lines for her to use.
7	"Getting Fired"	Raito Nishizaka & Michael Williams	Christopher McCombs	December 27, 2020
After firing Hamilton and Maria, Mr. O enters as Kaori’s new assistant. Hamilton gets interviewed by Bob for a job, much to Tomoko’s dismay. Hiro and Aoi help create lines to fire Bob from the office, however Mr. O’s advice is much harsher than Hamilton and Maria, causing Bob to break down.
8	"Apologies"	Raito Nishizaka & Michael Williams	Christopher McCombs	December 30, 2020
Risa and Shayna come to blows again on the set of Shayna Sanpo. Seeing that she’s hurt, Risa goes against the advice given by Mr. O and decides to apologize. Mr. O reveals himself to be a demon sent from Ben to ruin the show. Za sends him back to Ben and Kaori goes to speak with Hamilton, Maria and Tamura where they all apologize to each other.

== Reception ==
Japan Times writer Matt Schley wrote, “Like the main series, “Benza English” pokes fun at Japan and its occasionally awkward relationship with its non-Japanese population, though it just as often turns the tables. The fourth-wall-breaking characters even have some choice words for viewers who gave the original “The Benza” one-star reviews online."

== Awards and honors ==
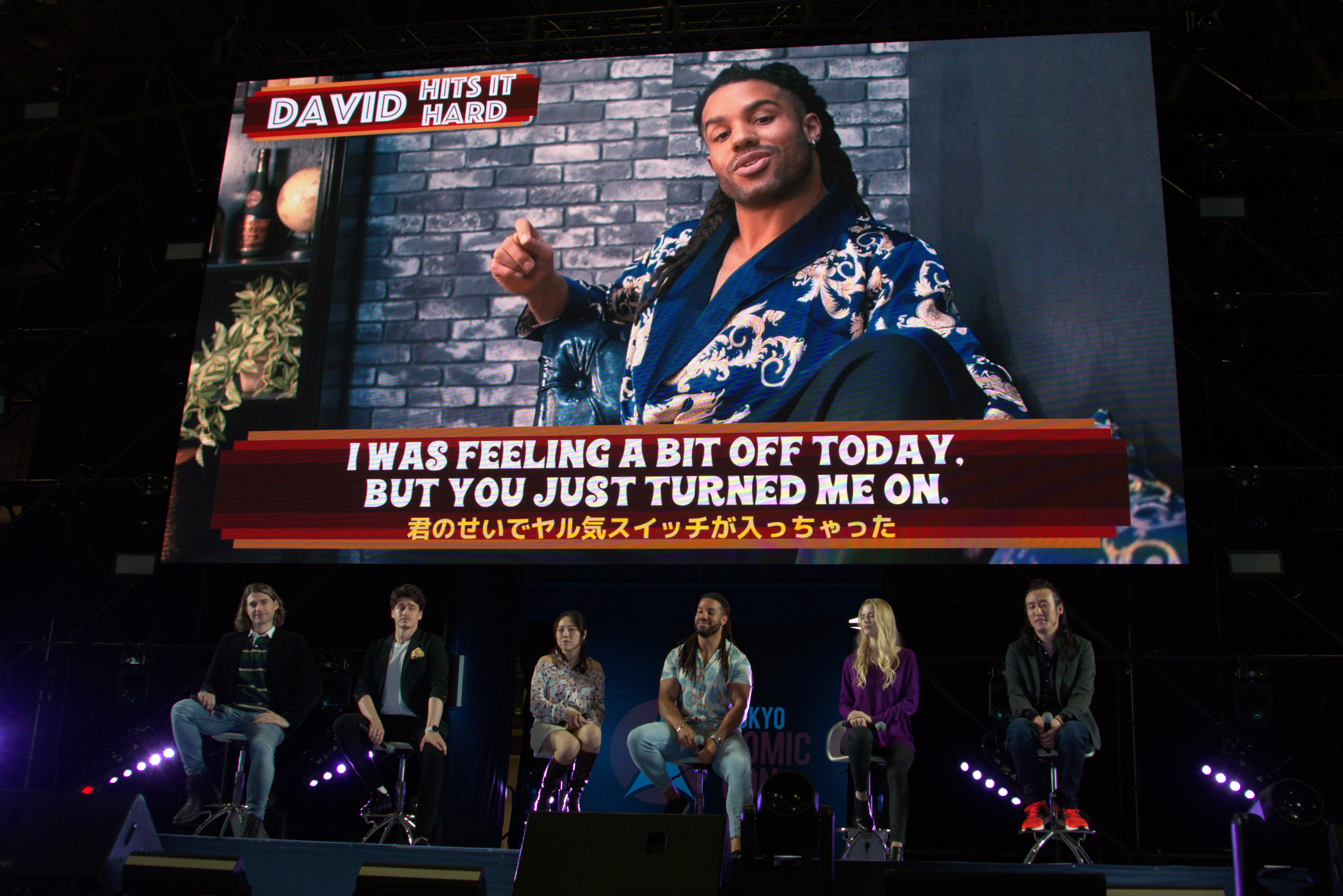
David Hits it Hard from Benza English at Tokyo Comic Con

The following are awards that have been earned by the cast and crew of "Benza English" series 1 in 2020:

Award	Category	Nominee(s)	Result
Cult Critics Film Festival	Best Supporting Actress	Maria Papadopoulou	Won
Cult Critics Film Festival	Best Television Series	Benza English	Won
Festigious Film Festival	Best Television Series	Benza English	Won
Seoul Webfest	Best Guest Star	Naito Satoko	Won
Seoul Webfest	Rising Star	Alexander W. Hunter	Won
Asian Cinematography Awards	Best Web Drama	Benza English	Won
Eurasia International Monthly Film Festival	Best Web Episode	Benza English	Won
Oniros Film Awards	Best Ensemble Award	Benza English Cast	Won
DMOFF 2020	Best Web Series	Benza English	Won
DMOFF 2020	Festival Choice Award	Benza English	Won
Druk International Film Festival	Best Television Series	Benza English	Won
Druk International Film Festival	Best Supporting Actor	Aver Hamilton II	Won
Asia Web Awards	Best Comedy Actress	Kaori Ikeda	Won
Asia Web Awards	Best Supporting Actor	Min Lee Kuk	Won

== Spin-off series ==
In 2020, a spin-off retro rpg video game called The Benza RPG was announced. It was initially released for iOS platforms in October 2020 and takes place between Benza English and series two of The Benza. The player primarily plays as Chris and Kyle as they try to save Higashi Nakano from Inko Sensei and save Lee who has been kidnapped.
