= Tokyo Weekender =

English publication in Japan

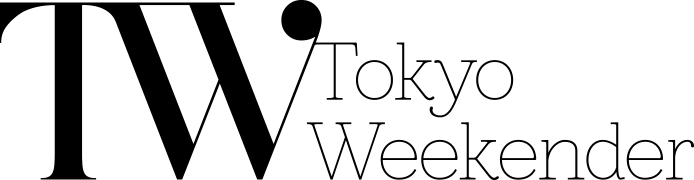
- Editor-in-chief: Nick Narigon
- Categories: Lifestyle, culture, travel, events
- Frequency: Monthly
- Publisher: ENGAWA Co., Ltd.
- Founded: 1970; 56 years ago
- Company: ENGAWA
- Country: Japan
- Based in: Tokyo, Japan
- Language: English
- Website: tokyoweekender.com

Tokyo Weekender is an English-language magazine published in Japan, founded in 1970 by Corky Alexander and Susan Scully. Initially published bi-monthly, Tokyo Weekender is now published monthly.

== History ==
Tokyo Weekender was co-founded by Korean War veteran Millard "Corky" Alexander and Susan Scully, previously co-workers at Pacific Stars and Stripes. It was the first free regular English publication in Japan. It used to come inside the Friday edition of the English Daily Yomiuri. After Corky died, the publication was taken over by his daughter and son-in-law before being relaunched by Caroline Pover. In 2008 Tokyo Weekender was purchased by Bulbouscell Media Group. In 2015, Bulbouscell Media Group was bought by the PR Agency Sunny Side Up Inc., and later merged with ENGAWA K.K., an SSU group company which was established in late 2015. In April 2020, Tokyo Weekender hired editor in chief Nick Narigon, who replaced Annemarie Luck.

Tokyo Weekender was featured on Japanese news channel NHK and NHK World when the publication celebrated its 40th anniversary in 2010.

== Columnists ==
- The editorial team includes Annemarie Luck, Lisa Wallin and Nicholas Narigon.
- The Creative Director of the magazine is Liam Ramshaw.
- Tokyo Weekender's features writer is Matthew Hernon.
- The longest-running contributor to the magazine was Bill Hersey until his death in 2018. His weekly column on parties was published for over 40 years and lives on with David Schneider's TW Social column.
- Other contributors have included Ian de Stains OBE, formerly of the British Chamber of Commerce in Japan and Japanese broadcaster NHK.
