= Janni Olsson =

Swedish television presenter (born 1985)

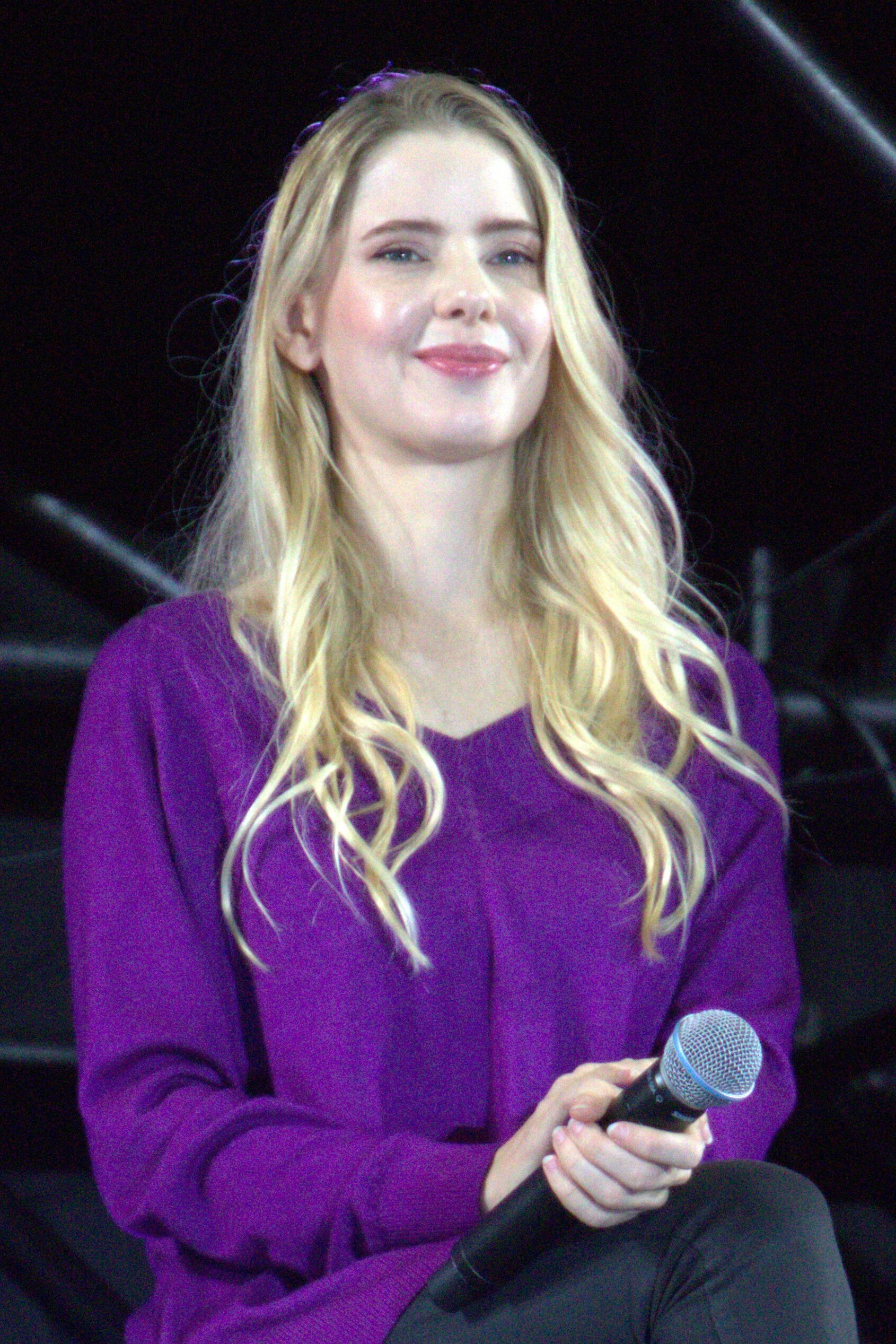
- Born: 22 March 1985 (age 41); Gothenburg, Sweden
- Occupations: TV host, actress, model, outdoor columnist
- Years active: 2015–present
- Employer: Free Wave Co. Ltl.
- Notable work: Getting Dirty in Japan; The Benza; Benza English
- Relatives: Christian Olsson (brother)

Janni Olsson (born 22 March 1985), also known in Japan as the "Swedish Outdoor Girl" (スウェーデンのアウトドアガール), is a Swedish television presenter, actress, and outdoor journalist based in Japan. She is best known as the co-creator and host of the travel and adventure series Getting Dirty in Japan, which has been distributed internationally on Amazon Prime Video. As an actress, she appeared in the award-winning comedy series The Benza and its spin-off Benza English as Alena. She has also worked as a reporter for NHK World-Japan’s food and culture program Trails to Oishii Tokyo as well as Cycle Around Japan. In addition to her television career, Olsson has written for outdoor magazines including BE-PAL and PEAKS. She has also appeared across Japanese media such as commercials, radio programs, and stage productions. She works as a producer and writer, contributing to cross-cultural projects between Sweden and Japan.

== Early life ==
Olsson was born in Sweden and grew up with a strong interest in outdoor activities, spending much of her childhood camping, hiking, and exploring nature with her family.

Alongside her outdoor interests, she trained in martial arts, particularly Wing Chun which she continued to practice for 13 years.

After a five week backpacking trip in Japan with her brother Christian Olsson, she developed an interest in Japanese culture. When she came back home she started studying Japanese language at the University of Gothenburg (Göteborgs Universitet).

Olsson moved to Tokyo in 2012 where she initially studied as an exchange student at Tokyo Gakugei University before beginning her career in television, film, and fashion.

== Career ==
=== Acting ===
Janni Olsson began her entertainment career after being scouted while studying as an exchange student at Tokyo Gakugei University. Before moving into Japanese media, she had worked as a theme-park mascot in Sweden. In 2018, she joined the Tokyo Cowboys production of the web series The Benza as the character Alena. The series premiered internationally on Amazon Prime Video in 2019, and for her performance she won Best Supporting Actress at the 2019 Seoul Webfest. She later appeared in the spin-off Benza English.

In addition to television, she has acted in musicals and other stage productions in Tokyo, appeared in commercials, and provided voice work for video games such as The Benza RPG.

=== Reporting and Presenting ===
Olsson’s breakthrough as a reporter came when she joined NHK World–Japan’s food and culture program Trails to Oishii Tokyo (then known as Trails to Tsukiji) in 2016, despite having no prior media experience. She went on to contribute as a reporter to other NHK programs such as Cycle Around Japan, Journeys in Japan, and BOSAI: Be Prepared, and has appeared as a presenter on lifestyle shows like Dive in Tokyo. In 2025, she also appeared on OgiYahagi no Happy Camper, where she introduced Nordic approaches to camping.

=== Writing and Journalism ===
Alongside her television career, Olsson has built a reputation as a writer and outdoor journalist. She is a regular contributor to Japanese outdoor magazines such as BE-PAL and PEAKS, writing about hiking, camping, and other adventure sports. In 2023, she contributed a column to Liniere magazine about her experiences in Tromsø, Norway, and she has appeared in features about Scandinavian lifestyles, including Nordic holiday traditions, sauna culture, and Swedish interior decorating.

Olsson has also spoken publicly about the Swedish tradition of fika, explaining that it is “not only about drinking coffee and eating sweets, but about taking a moment to connect with others and appreciate the environment around you.” She highlights that the custom reflects the Swedish approach to outdoor life, where social connection and nature are equally valued.

In December 2020, she appeared on the NHK program Sekai wa Hoshii Mono ni Afureteiru, where she discussed Swedish culture alongside sumo wrestler Tochinoshin.

Olsson released Fika With a View, an e-book exploring Swedish fika, outdoor living, and seasonal recipes in August 2026.

=== Producing and Other Media Work ===
In addition to acting and reporting, Olsson co-produces and hosts the travel and adventure series Getting Dirty in Japan, which launched in 2023 on Amazon Prime Video. The show combines outdoor experiences with cultural exploration and reflects her own interest in nature. She has also participated in cross-cultural projects linking Sweden and Japan and continues to make guest appearances on radio programs such as NHK, JFN, and InterFM, where she talks about travel, culture, and the outdoors.

Olsson is currently represented in Japan by Free Wave CO., Ltd.

== Personal life ==
Olsson is based in Tokyo, Japan. In addition to her media career, she is active in a variety of outdoor sports including hiking, bouldering, and camping, interests she frequently documents in her writing and television work. Because of her regular contributions to outdoor publications and her public promotion of outdoor activities, she has been nicknamed the "Swedish Outdoor Girl" (スウェーデンのアウトドアガール) in Japan. She has described spending time in nature as an important balance to her professional activities.

== Filmography ==
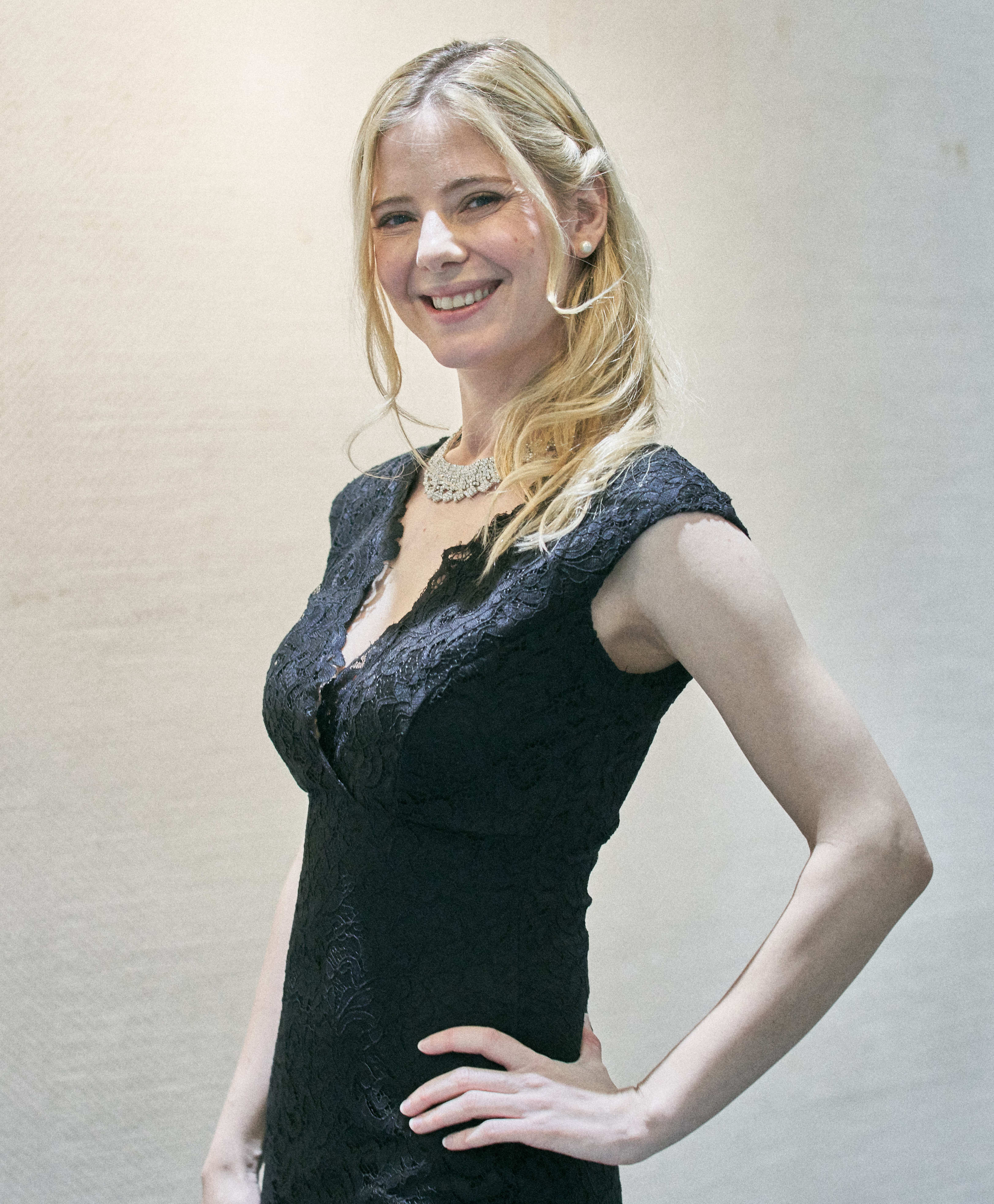
Janni Olsson Benza English Premiere

=== Television ===
Year	Title	Role	Notes	Ref(s)
2016–Present	Trails to Oishii Tokyo (former Trails to Tsukiji)	Self	Reporter	
2017	Doki Doki! ワールドTV	Self	Reporter	
2017-2018	Yojimo!Shibugoji (四時も!シブ五時)	Self		
2018	J-Trip Plan	Self	Reporter	
2018	Tokyo Eye 2020	Self	Reporter	
2018	Prime News Evening (プライムニュース イブニング)	Self	Reporter	
2019	Nippon hyakumeisan special (にっぽんの百名⼭スペシャル)	Self	Reporter, Special Guest	
2019	The Benza	Alena Treasurehunter		
2020	Benza English	Alena Treasurehunter		
2020	At One with Nature National Parks of Japan	Self	Reporter	
2020	Sekai ga hoshii mono ni afureteiru (世界はほしいモノにあふれている)	Self		
2022	Asagaya Apartment （阿佐ヶ谷アパートメント）	Self		
2022–Present	BOSAI: Be Prepared	Self	Reporter	
2022	Gojinimuchuu (5時に夢中!)	Self		
2022-2023	Waruiko atsumare (ワルイコあつまれ)			
2023	The Masterfully Marbled World of Japanese Wagyu Beef	Self	Reporter	
2023	CYCLE AROUND JAPAN	Self	Reporter	
2023	Journeys in Japan "Amami Oshima: Beauty in the Rain"	Self	Reporter	
2023	Getting Dirty in Japan (ゲッティング・ダーティ・イン・ジャパン)	Self	Host, Producer & Creator	
2023	Nippon Hyakumeizan (にっぽんの百名⼭)	Self	Reporter, Special Guest	
2024	Gaikokujin ga erabu nihon no onsenchi sousenkyo (外国人が選ぶ好きな日本の温泉地総選挙)	Self	Special Guest	

== Magazine ==
Year	Title	Role	Notes	Ref(s)
2023	Outdoor Japan Issue 87 「Getting Dirty in Japan」		Interview	
2023	NHK Publishing 「スウェーデンの人が英語も話せる理由は？【英会話タイムトライアル】」		Interview	
2022	Liniere Aug Issue「Outdoor with Nordic Style 北欧スタイルに学ぶ自然に親しむアウトドア」		Interview & Model	
2022	TRANSIT Issue 56「いつか泊まりたい、世界の山の宿」		Writer	
2022	English Journal March Issue「世界で輝く女性たちの言葉」		Interview	
2022	Anan March Issue 「私たちが見てきた世界と日本のSDGs」		Interview	
2022	GOODSPRESS Oct Issue 「キャンプ&アクティビティに取り入れたい"アウトドア・フィーカ"【趣味と遊びの秘密基地ギア】」		Interview	
2022	Be-Pal Oct Issue		Model	
2021	週刊新潮【異邦人のグルメ】Issue 96		Interview	
2021	Liniere Dec issue「北欧から届いた暮らしのアイデア」		Interview & Model	
2021	PAPERSKY Nov Issue 「Old Japanese Highway歩いて旅する、日本の古道 祖谷街道トレイル」		Model	
2019	BE-PAL Dec Issue 「本格的北欧式サウナに北欧ガールが入ってみた！」		Interview & Model	
2019	BE-PAL Aug Issue 「ヤンニ・オルソンの北欧アウトドアのススメ」		Writer & Model	
2019	BE-PAL May Issue		Cover Model & interview	
2019	PEAKS March Issue 「日本で見つけた登山の魅力と癒やし」		Interview	
2017	GARVY Oct/Nov Issue 「 全身で自然と戯れるボルダリング×キャンプ 」		Model	
2017	GARVY Sep Issue 「ヤンニのアウトドア日記・燕岳・北燕を歩く」		Writer & Model	
2017	GARVY April Issue 「服と冒険とガール・スリルと春を探して西伊豆林道ドライブ」		Model	

=== Magazine Serialisation ===
Year	Title	Role	Notes	Ref(s)
2017	GARVY （ガルヴィ）	Writer & Model		
2018–Present	BE-PAL （ビーパル）	Writer & Model		
2023	Liniere （リンネル）	Writer & Model		

== Radio ==
Year	Title	Role	Notes	Ref(s)
2023	NHK Radio 英会話タイムトライアル	Navigator		
2023	FM Yokohama The Burn	Interview		
2023	FM Yokohama SUNSTAR WEEKEND JOURNEY	Interview		

== Musical ==
Year	Title	Role	Notes	Ref(s)
2019	SIGNS!	Various Roles		

== Video games ==
Year	Title	Role	Notes	Ref(s)
2021	The Benza RPG	Alena Treasurehunter	Voice Actor	

== Awards ==
Year	Award	Category	Role	Result	Ref.
2019	Festigious International Film Festival	Best Ensemble Cast	Alena – The Benza	Won	
2019	Festigious International Film Festival	Best Original Song "Running Around"	Self – The Benza Soundtrack	Won	
2019	Seoul Webfest	Best Supporting Actress	Alena – The Benza	Won	
