= TMS Entertainment =

Japanese animation studio

TMS Entertainment Co., Ltd.
- Logo used since 2012 (Note: The logo's style has been in use since 2000.)

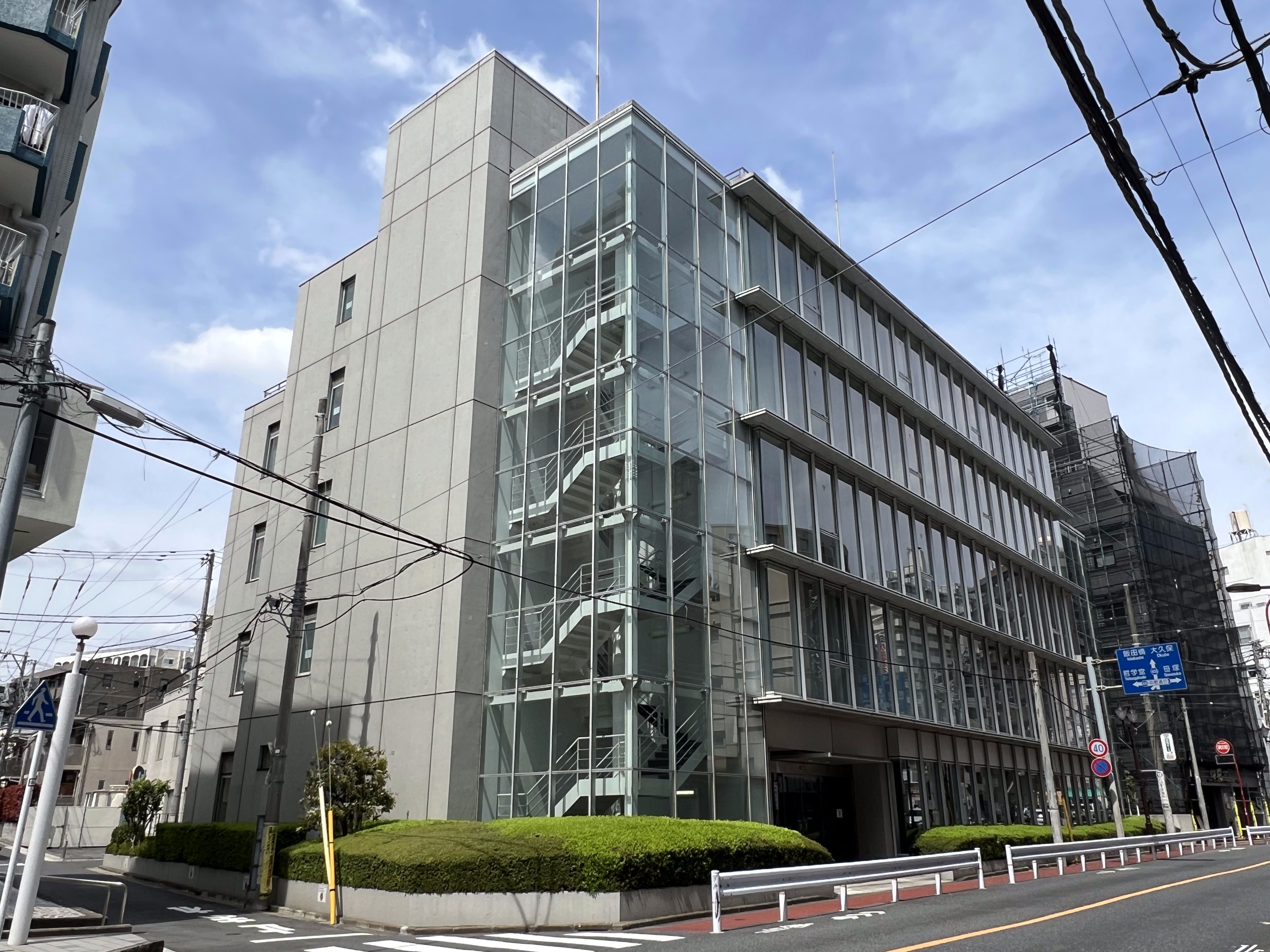
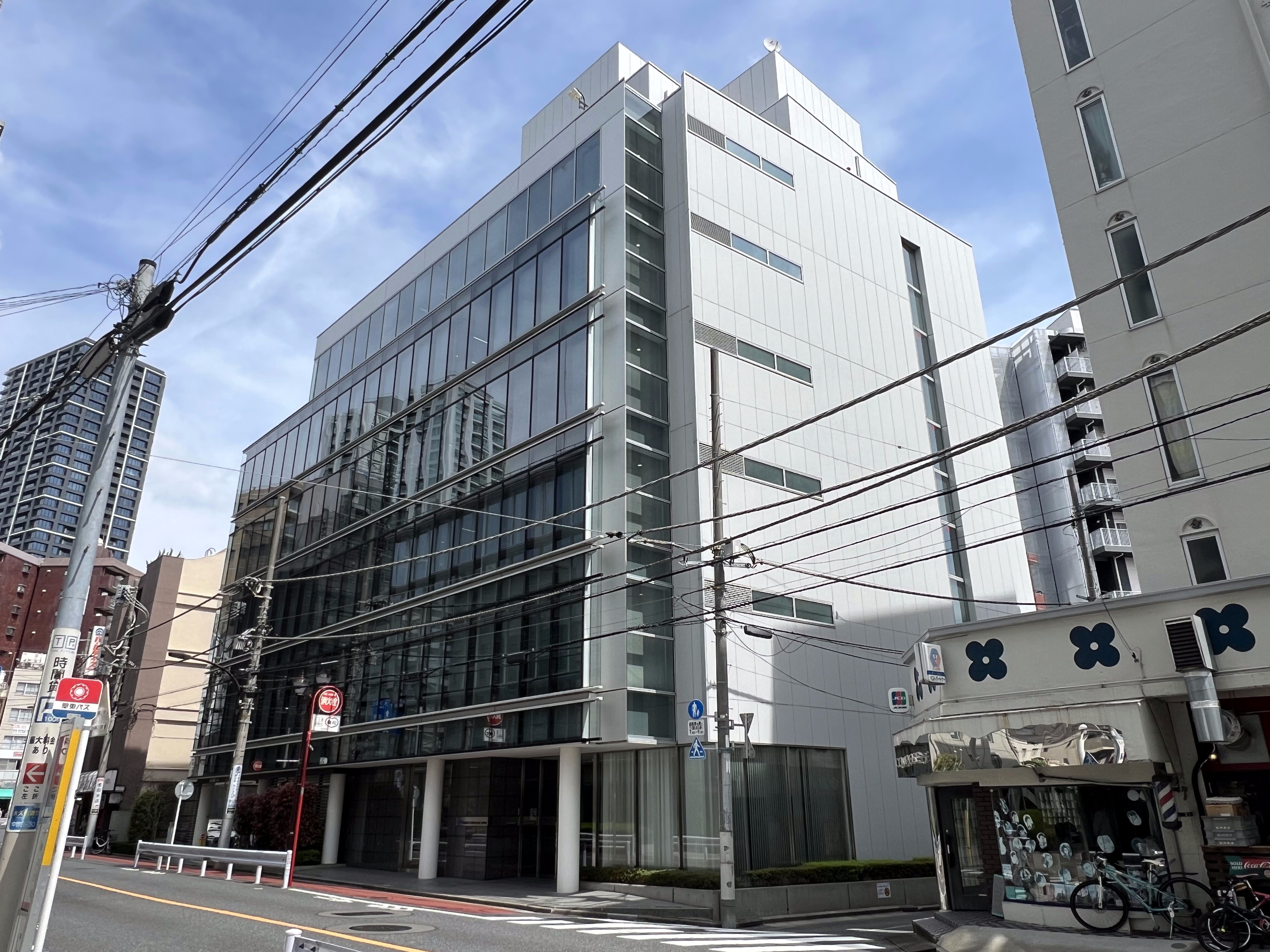
- Headquarters in Nakano, Tokyo
- Native name: 株式会社トムス・エンタテインメント
- Romanized name: Kabushiki-gaisha Tomusu Entateinmento
- Formerly: Asahi Gloves Manufacturing Co., Ltd. (1946); Kyokuichi Knitting & Weaving Co., Ltd. (1946–1957); Kyokuichi Shine Industries Co., Ltd. (1957–1991); Kyokuichi Corporation (1991–1999); TMS Entertainment, Ltd. (1999–2012)
- Type: Subsidiary
- Industry: Anime
- Predecessor: Tokyo Movie Shinsha
- Founded: October 22, 1946; 80 years ago (as Asahi Gloves)
- Headquarters: Nakano, Nakano, Tokyo (Note: Headquarters), Japan
- Number of locations: Chūō, Nakano, Tokyo, (Note: Studio) Japan
- Area served: Worldwide
- Key people: Yukio Sugino (chairman); Tadashi Takezaki (president and CEO)
- Number of employees: 372 (As of March 2026) (Not including subsidiaries)
- Parent: Sega Sammy Holdings (2004–2015); Sega Group Corporation (2015–2021); Sega Corporation (2021–present)
- Divisions: Telecom Animation Film
- Subsidiaries: Toon Harbor Works; TMS Music; TMS Entertainment USA; TMS Entertainment Europe
- Website: www.tms-e.co.jp/global/

TMS Entertainment Co., Ltd. (Japanese: 株式会社トムス・エンタテインメント, Hepburn: Kabushiki-gaisha Tomusu Entateinmento), formerly known as the Kyokuichi Corporation, (Note: Japanese: 株式会社キョクイチ, Hepburn: Kabushiki-gaisha Kyokuichi) is a Japanese animation studio owned by Sega Corporation based in Nakano, Tokyo with its offices in Nakano and its studios in Chūō.

TMS is one of the oldest and most renowned animation studios in Japan, known for its numerous anime franchises such as Detective Conan, Lupin the Third, D.Gray-man, and Anpanman. Aside from animation production, the company also handles program sales and character licensing.

TMS Entertainment is the animation business company of the Sega Group and a well-established animation studio with its origins in Tokyo Movie. Originally established in 1946 as a textile manufacturer, the company entered animation when they merged with animation studio Tokyo Movie Shinsha to start an animation production business, known as the Kyokuichi Tokyo Movie (Note: キョクイチ東京ムービー, Kyokuichi-Tōkyō Mūbī) division or TMS-Kyokuichi Corporation (TMS-K). (Note: Originally, TMS stood for Tokyo Movie Shinsha.)

Tokyo Movie Shinsha was one of the five major studios in the early days of Japanese animation, producing and/or animating a string of popular works from the 1960s to the 1970s, including Obake no Q-Tarō, Star of the Giants, Moomin, Attack No. 1, Tensai Bakabon, Lupin the 3rd Part I, Aim for the Ace!, and Gamba no Bouken.

TMS has studios 1 through 7 under its production headquarters, each with a nickname for the work they are involved in, such as Studio 1, 3xCube, Trois Studios, Rogue Studio, and Double Eagle. Each studio has its own production and management staff, including producers and production assistants. As for animators, each studio contracts them on a work-by-work basis. However, head creators sometimes have exclusive contracts and are given their own desks within the company to work on.

In addition to its own studios, TMS has wholly owned animation studios such as Telecom Animation Film, TMS Jinni's (former Jinni's Animation Studio) and Toon Additional Pictures.

Throughout the 1980s and the 1990s, TMS and its subsidiaries, Telecom Animation Film and South Korea-based Seoul Movie, animated for various companies, including DiC, Disney Television Animation, Warner Bros. Animation, Marvel Films Animation, Studio Ghibli, Madhouse, Production I.G, Sunrise, Bones, ShoPro, Shogakukan Music & Digital Entertainment among others, Since the early 2000s, TMS itself has no longer supplied animation services to Western studios due to increasingly demanding costs, although there have been a few exceptions such as Green Lantern: First Flight (2009) and Superman vs. The Elite (2012). While it still produces feature films, these films are primarily spinoffs from existing anime properties, which include the likes of Anpanman and Detective Conan.

== History ==
=== Prehistory of TMS Entertainment (Kyokuichi) ===
In 1946, Asahi Glove Manufacturing Co., Ltd. (アサヒ手袋製造株式会社, Asahi Tebukuro Seizō Kabushiki-gaisha) was founded in Nagoya, Aichi Prefecture and the trade name was soon changed to Kyokuichi Knitting & Weaving Co., Ltd. (旭一編織株式会社, Kyokuichi Amiori Kabushiki-gaisha).

The company changed its name to Kyokuichi Co., Ltd. (株式会社キョクイチ, Kabushiki-gaisha Kyokuichi) in 1947, and then to Kyokuichi Shine Industries Co., Ltd. (旭一シャイン工業株式会社, Kyokuichi Shain Kōgyō Kabushiki-gaisha) in 1957, and was listed on the Nagoya Stock Exchange.

The company established Shine Mink Co., Ltd. in Sapporo, Hokkaido in 1961, opened a mink breeding farm and began its fur business in 1962, and merged with Shine Mink in 1974 to form the Mink Division.

In 1989, Kyokuichi Shine Industries was acquired by Watchman Group, a mass retail group of watches and home appliances, and changed its business format to entertainment business.

=== Prehistory of TMS Entertainment (Tokyo Movie and Tokyo Movie Shinsha) ===
Tokyo Movie Co., Ltd.
- Native name: 株式会社東京ムービー
- Romanized name: Kabushiki-gaisha Tōkyō Mūbi
- Type: Private (1964–1976); Subsidiary (1976–1993)
- Industry: Anime; Animated series
- Founded: 1964; 62 years ago
- Founder: Yutaka Fujioka
- Defunct: 1993
- Fate: Absorbed into Tokyo Movie Shinsha
- Successor: Tokyo Movie Shinsha
- Headquarters: Kamitakada, Nakano, Tokyo, Japan
- Owner: Tokyo Movie Shinsha (1976–1993)
- Number of employees: 235 (2020)

Tokyo Movie Shinsha Co., Ltd.
- Native name: 株式会社東京ムービー新社
- Romanized name: Kabushiki-gaisha Tōkyō Mūbi Shinsha
- Type: Private (1976–1991); Subsidiary (1991–1995)
- Industry: Anime; Animated series
- Founded: June 1976; 50 years ago
- Founder: Yutaka Fujioka
- Defunct: November 1, 1995
- Fate: Merged with Kyokuichi
- Successor: Kyokuichi Tokyo Movie Division/TMS-Kyokuichi
- Headquarters: Kamitakada, Nakano, Tokyo, Japan
- Owner: Sega Enterprises (1991–1995)
- Number of employees: 235 (2020)
- Subsidiaries: Telecom Animation Film; TMS Photo

In 1964, Yutaka Fujioka, a former staff of the puppet theater company Hitomi-za (人形劇団ひとみ座, Ningyō Gekidan Hitomi-za), established the animation studio Tokyo Movie Co., Ltd. (Note: 株式会社東京ムービー, Tōkyō Mūbī) with investment from Tokyo Broadcasting System.

Inspired by the broadcast of the first domestically produced animated TV series Astro Boy on Fuji Television the previous year, TBS encouraged Fujioka, who was working at Tokyo Ningyo Cinema (東京人形シネマ, Tōkyō Ningyō Shinema), the film production division of Hitomi-za, which had produced puppet theater programs for the station, to establish a studio.

The studio's first production was an animated adaptation of Osamu Tezuka's Big X. However, because all the staff came from puppet theater backgrounds and were unfamiliar with animation, the studio suffered a huge loss and fell into financial crisis.

In order to restore management, the studio received capital participation from the TV production company Kokusai Hōei (formerly Shintoho). Fujioka, the founder of the company, was demoted to director and head of the production department, and Rokuzo Abe of Kokusai Hōei was appointed as the new president.

In 1965, Fujioka established A Production to rebuild the production system, and Tokyo Movie formed a business alliance with A Production as an actual animation production company. Fujioka approached Daikichirō Kusube, who had left Toei Animation and was working as a freelancer, and by making him the representative of A Production, he succeeded in inviting talented Toei creators such as Tsutomu Shibayama, Yoshio Kabashima, and Keisuke Morishita. Fujioka also welcomed Isao Takahata, Hayao Miyazaki, Yasuo Ōtsuka, and Yōichi Kotabe, who had been forced out of Toei for overspending on The Great Adventure of Horus, Prince of the Sun.

Early directors, such as Tadao Nagahama and Masaaki Ōsumi, were all from puppet theater companies with no animation experience, but they produced a series of hits, including Obake no Q-Tarō, Star of the Giants, and Attack No. 1. Thanks to them, Tokyo Movie became independent from Kokusai Hōei in 1971, and Fujioka returned as president. The studio continued to produce a string of hits thereafter, including Tensai Bakabon, Lupin the 3rd Part I, Aim for the Ace!, and Gamba no Bouken.

Fujioka invested in Madhouse when it was founded in 1972.

In 1975, Tokyo Movie established Telecom Animation Film to train animators who could draw full animations.

Feeling the limitations of the Japanese animation business, Fujioka dreamed of expanding to the United States and making full animation films that could compete with Disney. However, since limited animation, which had been adopted and developed by Osamu Tezuka, was the mainstream in Japan, he planned to establish a new animation studio that would handle full animation and use it as a base to produce joint Japanese-US animated films.

Fujioka chose the legendary American comic strip Little Nemo as the basis for his animated film, and began acquiring the film rights in 1977. Telecom received over 1,000 applications for its employee recruitment, and Fujioka hired 43 people with no animation production experience. Rather than hiring animators with limited animation production experience, Fujioka chose to hire inexperienced amateurs and train them to become first-class animators who could draw full animations. Telecom invited Sadao Tsukioka, who was considered a genius, as a lecturer for the first year, and Yasuo Ōtsuka the following year.

In June 1976, Tokyo Movie spun off its sales division to establish Tokyo Movie Shinsha Co., Ltd., (Note: 株式会社東京ムービー新社, Kabushiki gaisha Tōkyō Mūbī Shinsha; lit. 'Tokyo Movie New-company') and the original Tokyo Movie was absorbed into it. Kusube and A Production terminated its business alliance with Tokyo Movie, changed its name to Shin-Ei Animation, and began its own path.

In the summer of 1978, Fujioka acquired the film rights to Little Nemo. However, due to difficulties in raising funds and securing staff, production was slow to begin, so Telecom produced TV series and movies under Ōtsuka, including Lupin the 3rd Part II. Ōtsuka approached Hayao Miyazaki and Isao Takahata, with Miyazaki directing the second Lupin the 3rd film, The Castle of Cagliostro, and Takahata directing Jarinko Chie.

Fujioka frequently invited Hollywood film professionals to screen the two films to promote the production capabilities of Telecom and Japanese animation industry, which at the time was underrated in the United States. These films attracted attention, especially among young animators, including John Lasseter. The event also drew an unexpected response, with Telecom receiving requests to produce a TV series from countries outside the U.S., including Italy.

In the U.S., the studio took on subcontracting work for production companies such as Disney, Warner Bros., and Filmation, and became proficient in the art of full animation.

In the early 1980s, Tokyo Movie Shinsha (TMS) began working on international co-productions by big-name directors with the goal of expanding overseas. TMS partnered with the French (later American) company DiC as an overseas subcontractor to produce animation for the company in 1980. (Note: This partnership would last until 1986, when DiC opened its own Japan-based animation facility known as K.K. DIC Asia (later Creativity & Development Asia) in 1983, for animation production on its shows in order to bypass overseas animation subcontractors.) Two Japanese-French co-productions, Ulysses 31 (Note: Nagahama died during production, making this his last work.) in 1981, directed by Tadao Nagahama, and Lupin VIII (Note: The story depicts the future of the world of Lupin III, and features the descendants of the Lupin family.) in 1982, directed by Rintaro, were produced in cooperation with DIC.

TMS began production of the Japanese-Italian co-production TV series Sherlock Hound in 1981 at the request of RAI, the Italian national public broadcasting company. The series was directed by Hayao Miyazaki and animated by Telecom Animation Film. However, the collaboration was dissolved after six episodes were produced, and the remaining 20 episodes were subsequently financed by Japanese companies. Kyosuke Mikuriya took over as director, and with Telecom leaving to focus on the film Nemo, TMS outsourced the animation to the fledgling studio Gallop. Osamu Dezaki directed the largest number of animated co-productions, including Mighty Orbots, (Note: Mighty Orbots was the first time a Japanese animation studio had received an order directly from an American TV station without going through an American production company.) Bionic Six, and Sweet Sea. (Note: Initially, Space Cobra was reported in Japanese anime magazines as a Japanese-Italian co-production, but when production actually began, that story was dropped.)

In the spring of 1981, Fujioka received an investment from Lake, a consumer finance company, and established Kineto TMS, a U.S. incorporated company, to begin full-scale production of the film Little Nemo: Adventures in Slumberland.

The initial production budget was reported to be about 3.6 billion yen (16 million dollars at the exchange rate in 1981). Under Fujioka's grand order to produce a world-class animation film, creators from Japan and abroad were assembled. Many prominent figures were involved in the production, including Hayao Miyazaki, Isao Takahata, Osamu Dezaki, Yasuo Ōtsuka, Ray Bradbury, Jean Giraud (Mœbius), and Chris Columbus. However, the production ran into difficulties due to various crosscurrents between Japan and the U.S. Miyazaki and Takahata, who were originally slated to direct the film, dropped out of the project, and the staff was replaced one by one in the following years.

In 1982, Fujioka secured the cooperation of Frank Thomas and Ollie Johnston from Disney's Nine Old Men. In the summer of that year, at their invitation, Miyazaki, Takahata, Ōtsuka, and other Japanese staff members visited the U.S. under the guise of training. While the Japanese staff members were greatly inspired by the two during their training, when the two saw the sketches drawn by Miyazaki, they said there was nothing they could teach them.

Young American animators who had heard rumors of the Nemo production also came to Kineto TMS to sell themselves, including John Lasseter and Brad Bird, who reportedly met Miyazaki there for the first time. Bird brought in his own film and unofficially drew several image boards. Fujioka succeeded in meeting George Lucas and asked him to be the American producer, but he declined, saying he was busy with the new Star Wars and Indiana Jones films, and instead recommended Gary Kurtz, who was also a producer on Star Wars. Fujioka from Japan was appointed line producer, and Kurtz from the United States was appointed film producer.

Kurtz recommended Ray Bradbury as the screenwriter, and the project got underway. When the Japanese production team was handed the first draft of Bradbury's screenplay, they wondered if it was too philosophical to be entertaining. Miyazaki presented various ideas for the script to Kurtz, but he never adopted them. (Note: Miyazaki later reused them for Nausicaä of the Valley of the Wind and Princess Mononoke.)

Kurtz was executive-producing Return to Oz for Disney at this time and spent most of his time in London and New York, visiting the site of Nemo in Los Angeles only once a month, and then for just a couple of hours in the afternoon. Due to conflicts with Kurtz, Miyazaki resigned from Telecom in November 1982, and Takahata in March 1983. Kurtz's dictatorship continued, and the project went astray. The directors changed one after another, and the team went all to bits. The production budget of 4.5 billion yen (19 million dollars at the 1984 rate) ran out before the animation work began, and the project was suspended in August 1984.

In June 1988, TMS dissolved its own production division, Tokyo Movie, and absorbed it; Tokyo Movie would continue as a TMS subsidiary until 1993.

Fujioka resumed production after securing an additional investment of 1 billion yen (6.9 million dollars at the 1987 rate) from Lake in 1987 and terminated his contract with Kurtz and took full responsibility for the film, becoming executive producer himself. The film was completed in 1988 and released in Japan in July 1989, and received mixed reviews, it ended up grossing around 900 million yen (7 million dollars at the 1988 rate) at the box office. It was released in the United States in 1992 in 2,300 theaters and sold 4 million videos, but the production costs were not recouped. The film took about seven years to complete (it took 10 years for the U.S. release), and production costs eventually rose to 5.5 billion yen (43.3 million dollars at the 1992 rate).

The main staff changed constantly, and later left behind a vast number of ideas, designs, and sketches submitted by various creators, (Note: There is an anecdote about an American staff member who later saw Miyazaki's sketch and sternly asked those involved why they did not adopt it.) scenarios by Bradley, Columbus, most of which were never used, and others, and pilots in three versions: Sadao Tsukioka's version, Yoshifumi Kondō and Kazuhide Tomonaga's version, and Osamu Desaki's version.

It was an unprecedented project in the history of Japanese animation, but it ended in failure, and Fujioka took responsibility for it, relinquished all rights related to Tokyo Movie, and retired from the industry. Although Fujioka's ambitions ended in failure, Nemo left a great legacy, laying the foundation for the subsequent expansion of Japanese animation into the American market and also pioneering exchanges between Japan and the US in animation, such as the relationship between Miyazaki and the Nine Old Men. The composition of members at Telecom Animation Film for animated feature films directed by Hayao Miyazaki and Isao Takahata also served as a stepping stone for the transfer of Toei Animation's feature film production techniques to Studio Ghibli.

=== History of TMS Entertainment ===
Kyokuichi Co., Ltd. opened its first amusement arcade in 1991, and joined the Sega Group in 1992 through a business alliance with Sega and Sega Toys.

On November 1, 1995, Sega absorbed Tokyo Movie Shinsha into Kyokuichi, with Kyokuichi as the surviving company. In conjunction with this merger, Kyokuichi made Telecom Animation Film and TMS Photo, which were subsidiaries of Tokyo Movie Shinsha, its own subsidiaries. Kyokuichi established a Tokyo branch office and launched its animation production division, Tokyo Movie Division. The name of the company was credited as Kyokuichi Tokyo Movie in the anime works produced at that time, however international prints used the TMS-Kyokuichi name.

In 1996 the Los Angeles studio was established.

On January 1, 2000, Kyokuichi changed its name to TMS Entertainment Co., Ltd. The name Tokyo Movie remained as the name of the animation production division and as the brand name for animation production.

In 2003, the company completely withdrew from the textile business. Since then, animation production and amusement arcade operations were the two mainstays of its business.

In 2003, American brokerage group Merrill Lynch became the second-largest shareholder in TMS Entertainment after acquiring a 7.54 percent stake in the studio. Merrill Lynch purchased the stake purely for investment purposes and had no intention of acquiring control of the firm's management.

In 2005, Sega Sammy Holdings acquired a 50.2% stake in TMS Entertainment, making it a subsidiary.

In 2006, the Tokyo branch was reorganized as the Tokyo headquarters and merged with the Head Office in Nagoya, Aichi Prefecture. The headquarters then moved to Shinjuku, Tokyo. The Los Angeles studio was reorganized as TMS ENTERTAINMENT, USA, INC.

In February 2007, TMS Entertainment announced the completion of its fourth Tokyo studio (Building D) in Nakano, Tokyo. The company stated that Shinjuku would thereafter serve as the base for its corporate division and Nakano as the base for its production division.

In 2008, the company withdrew from the amusement arcade business and concentrated its business on animation production.

In 2010, TMS Entertainment was delisted and became a wholly owned subsidiary of Sega Sammy Holdings through a share exchange.

In 2011, the credits for Detective Conan were changed to TMS Entertainment, and animation production under the Tokyo Movie name ended.

In November 2012, TMS relocated its headquarters to Nakano, Tokyo.

TMS Entertainment took a stake in Jinni's Animation Studio, a VFX and CG production company, in 2013 and made it a group company in 2015. With that, the company name was changed to TMS Jinni's.

In November 2013, a new studio was completed in Nakano, Tokyo.

In April 2015, the Sega Sammy Holdings was reorganized to form the new Sega Group. TMS Entertainment became a wholly owned subsidiary of the newly established Sega Holdings.

Marza Animation Planet moved from being part of Sega Holdings to being part of TMS Entertainment in April 2017. TMS Entertainment transferred all of the digital content planning, development, and production business owned by its subsidiary TOCSIS to Marza Animation Planet in April 2019.

In July 2021, TMS Entertainment announced the launch of the Unlimited Produce Project. The project is characterized by its focus on collaboration with outside studios to strengthen production operations such as planning, production, business, and promotion of works. The first project is Resident Evil: Infinite Darkness, which was distributed worldwide on Netflix from July 8, 2021, and was produced in collaboration with CG studio Quebico.

In April 2023, Marza Animation Planet moved from under TMS Entertainment to under its parent company, Sega.

In 2024, TMS Entertainment transferred the 3DCG video production business of its subsidiary TMS Jinni's to its subsidiary Toms Photo through a company split.

== Subsidiaries and divisions ==
The company has numerous animation subsidiaries and internal sub-divisions. Those include:

- TMS Entertainment USA, Inc.: Established in 1996 as the Los Angeles studio division. In 2006, it was renamed to TMS Entertainment USA, Inc.
- TMS Entertainment Europe SAS: Established in 2001 as the Paris studio division. In 2022, it was renamed to TMS Entertainment Europe SAS.
- TMSLab (トムスラボ): On April 26, 2022, TMS Entertainment Co., Ltd. announced the establishment of TMS-Lab (原作工房TMS-Lab), where 'TMS' stands for 'Theme, Message, Story'. The associate web site went operational on April 21, 2022. On December 22, 2022, it was renamed to TMSLab(トムスラボ), and the web site was relocated.
- Tokyo Movie Online (東京ムービーONLINE): On October 19, 2005, TMS Entertainment Co., Ltd. announced the establishment of Tokyo Movie Online video subscription platform.
- Tokyo Movie (東京ムービー(トウキョウムービー)): On December 22, 2005, TMS Entertainment Co., Ltd. announced the beginning of the Tokyo Movie service for EZweb users, effective on the same day.
- TMS MUSIC UK LTD.: Established on January 15, 2007.
- TMS MUSIC HK LTD.: On February 14, 2007, TMS Entertainment Co., Ltd. announced the establishment of TMS MUSIC HK LTD., to be established in March 2007.
- AG Bowl(エージーボウル): On April 21, 2008, TMS Entertainment Co., Ltd. announced the establishment of AG Bowl bowing facility in Ishioka, Ibaraki, to be opened 5 days later.
- Anpanman Digital LLP: On June 11, 2008, TMS Entertainment Co., Ltd. announced the establishment of Anpanman Digital LLP (アンパンマンデジタルLLP) with Nippon Television and Froebel-Kan Co., Ltd., with each founding member invested 100 million yen, to be established 5 days later.
- Telecom Animation Film Co., Ltd. (Japanese: 株式会社テレコム・アニメーションフィルム, Hepburn: Kabushiki-gaisha Terekomu Animēshon Firumu), a studio established on May 19, 1975. It first started as a subcontracting company for its parent, but has since become the leading animation studio behind the more recent Lupin the Third titles. The studio has also produced series like Chain Chronicle: The Light of Haecceitas, Orange, and Phantasy Star Online 2: The Animation.
- Marza Animation Planet Inc. (Japanese: 株式会社マーザ・アニメーションプラネット, Hepburn: Kabushiki gaisha Māza Animēshonpuranetto), a CG studio formerly a part of Sega and known for producing Space Pirate Captain Harlock, Resident Evil: Vendetta, and the 2020 Sonic the Hedgehog film. In 2023, Marza moved back into the Sega fold.
- V1 Studio (Japanese: ヴィーワンスタジオ, Hepburn: Vīuwan Sutajio), a studio most known for co-producing the Detective Conan films since the 16th movie and the 2nd season (and OVAs) of Kamisama Kiss.
- Double Eagle (Japanese: だぶるいーぐる, Hepburn: Daburuīguru), a studio most known for co-producing ReLIFE, Nana Maru San Batsu, and The Thousand Musketeers.
- 8PAN (Japanese: エイトパヌ, Hepburn: Eito Panu), a studio best known for co-producing Bakuon!!, D.Gray-man Hallow, and Dr. Stone.
- 3xCube (Japanese: スリーキューブ, Hepburn: Surīkyūbu), a studio known for producing The Pilot's Love Song, My Monster Secret, Sweetness and Lightning, and Megalobox.
- Studio Sakimakura (Japanese: スタジオさきまくら, Hepburn: Sutajio Sakimakura), a studio founded in March 2011, and known for producing the second half of the first season of Cardfight!! Vanguard and Brave 10.
- Trois Studio (Japanese: トロワスタジオ, Hepburn: Torowa Sutajio), a studio that produced Lupin III: Goodbye Partner, the 27th film special for the Lupin the Third franchise.
- Seoul Movie, a South Korean animation studio based in Seoul, established in 1990 and closed sometime in the late 2000s.

== Productions ==
=== Television series ===
==== 1960s ====
Title	Broadcast network(s)	Year(s)	Episodes	Note(s)
Big X	TBS	August 3, 1964 – September 27, 1965	59	Adapted from Osamu Tezuka's original manga, which was serialized in Shueisha's Shonen Book from 1963 to 1966.
Obake no Q-tarō	TBS	August 29, 1965 – June 28, 1967	96	Adapted from Fujiko Fujio's original manga, which was serialized in Shogakukan's Weekly Shonen Sunday from 1964 to 1966.
Perman	TBS	April 2, 1967 – April 14, 1968	54	Adapted from Fujiko Fujio's original manga, which was serialized in Shogakukan's Weekly Shonen Sunday from 1967 to 1968.
Kyojin no Hoshi	Yomiuri TV	March 30, 1968 – September 18, 1971	182	Adapted from the manga by Ikki Kajiwara and Noboru Kawasaki, which was serialized in Kodansha's Weekly Shonen Magazine from 1966 to 1971.
Kaibutsu-kun	TBS	April 21, 1968 – March 23, 1969	49	Adapted from Fujiko Fujio's original manga, which was serialized in Shonen Gahosha's Shonen Gaho from 1965 to 1969.
Umeboshi Denka	TBS	April 1 – September 23, 1969	26	Original series
Roppō Yabure-kun	Nagoya Broadcasting Network	April 28 – September 26, 1969	110	Adapted from Saga Sen's story of the same name.
Moomin	Fuji TV	October 5, 1969 – December 27, 1970	65	Adapted from Tove Jansson's book of the same name.
Attack No. 1	Fuji TV	December 7, 1969 – November 28, 1971	104	Adapted from Chikako Urano's original manga, which was serialized in Shueisha's Margaret manga magazine for female readers from 1968 to 1970.

==== 1970s ====
Title	Broadcast network(s)	Year(s)	Episodes	Note(s)
Chingō Muchabe	TBS	February 15 – March 22, 1971	51	
Shin Obake no Q-Tarō	Nippon TV; Yomiuri TV	September 1, 1971 – December 27, 1972	70	Adapted from Fujiko Fujio's original manga, which was serialized in Shogakukan's Shogakukan Learning Magazine from 1971 to 1973.
Tensai Bakabon	Nagoya Broadcasting Network; Nippon TV	September 25, 1971 – June 24, 1972	40	Adaptation from Fujio Akatsuka's original manga, which was serialized in Kodansha's Weekly Shonen Magazine and Shogakukan's Weekly Shonen Sunday manga magazines for boys from 1967 to 1976.
Lupin The Third Part I	Nippon TV	October 24, 1971 – March 26, 1972	23	Adapted from Monkey Punch's original manga, which was serialized in Futabasha's Weekly Manga Action manga magazine for adult male readers from 1967 to 1969.
Akado Suzunosuke	Fuji TV	April 5, 1972 – March 28, 1973	52	Adapted from Tsunayoshi Takeuchi's original manga, which was serialized in Shonen Gahosha's Shonen Gaho from 1954 to 1965.
Dokonjō Gaeru	ABC	October 7, 1972 – September 28, 1974	103	Adapted from Yasumi Yoshizawa's original manga, which was serialized in Shueisha's Weekly Shonen Jump manga magazine from 1970 to 1976.
Jungle Kurobee	Mainichi Broadcasting System	March 2 – September 28, 1973	31	Adapted from Fujiko Fujio's original manga.
Kōya no Shōnen Isamu	Fuji TV	April 4, 1973 – March 27, 1974	52	Adapted from the manga by Soji Yamakawa and Noboru Kawasaki, which was serialized in Shueisha's Weekly Shonen Jump from 1971 to 1974.
Karate Baka Ichidai	NET	October 3, 1973 – September 25, 1974	47	Adapted from Ikki Kajiwara's original manga, which was serialized in Kodansha's Weekly Shonen Magazine from 1971 to 1977.
Aim for the Ace!	Mainichi Broadcasting System	October 5, 1973 – March 29, 1974	26	Adapted from Sumika Yamamoto's original manga in Shueisha's Margaret manga magazine for female readers from 1973 to 1980. Co-production with Madhouse.
Samurai Giants	Yomiuri TV	October 7, 1973 – September 15, 1974	46	Adapted from the manga by Ikki Kajiwara and Kou Inoue in Shueisha's Weekly Shonen Jump from 1971 to 1974. Co-production with Madhouse.
Judo Sanka	Nippon TV	April 1 – September 30, 1974	27	Adapted from the manga by Ikki Kajiwara and Hiroshi Kaizuka in Shogakukan's Weekly Shonen Sunday from 1972 to 1975.
First Human Giatrus	ABC	October 5, 1974 – March 27, 1976	77	Adapted from Shunji Sonoyama's manga which was serialized from 1965 to 1975 in Jitsugyo no Nihon Sha's Weekly Manga Sunday, in 1966 alone in Gakken's Gakushuu Magazine, and Shogakukan's Gakunen Magazine in 1974.
Gamba no Bouken	Nippon TV	April 7 – September 29, 1975	26	Co-production with A Production.
Ganso Tensai Bakabon	Nippon TV	October 6, 1975 – September 26, 1977	103	Second adaptation of Tensai Bakabon. Last Tokyo Movie anime to be co-produced with A Production.
Hana no Kakarichō	TV Asahi	October 3, 1976 – March 27, 1977	25	
Glacier Warrior Gaislugger	TV Asahi	April 12, 1977 - August 30, 1977	20	Based on manga by Shotaro Ishinomori. Co-produced with Toei Company, another rare instance where Toei used another studio for its production, rather than its own Toei Animation studio. The only time they would work together with TMS.
Shin Kyōjin no Hoshi	Yomiuri TV; Nippon TV	October 1, 1977 – September 30, 1978	52	Adapted from the manga by Ikki Kajiwara and Noboru Kawasaki, which was serialized in Kodansha's Weekly Shonen Magazine from 1976 to 1979.
Nobody's Boy: Remi	Nippon TV	October 2, 1977 – October 1, 1978	51	Adapted from the novel Sans Famille (1878) by Hector Malot co-production with Madhouse.
Lupin III Part II	Nippon TV	October 3, 1977 – October 6, 1980	155	Second installment of Lupin III, and the most prolific in the franchise's history.
Treasure Island	Nippon TV	October 8, 1978 – April 1, 1979	26	Adapted from the novel by Robert Louis Stevenson. co-production with Madhouse.
New Aim For the Ace	Nippon TV	October 14, 1978 – March 31, 1979	25	Continuation of Aim for the Ace!
Shin Kyōjin no Hoshi 2	Yomiuri TV; Nippon TV	April 14 – September 29, 1979	23	Second adaptation of Shin Kyojin no Hoshi.
The Rose of Versailles	Nippon TV	October 10, 1979 – September 3, 1980	40	Adapted from Riyoko Ikeda's original manga in Shueisha's Margaret from 1972 to 1973.

==== 1980s ====
Title	Broadcast network(s)	Year(s)	Episodes	Note(s)
Mū no Hakugei	Yomiuri TV	April 4 – September 26, 1980	26	Original series
New Tetsujin-28	Nippon TV	October 3, 1980 – September 25, 1981	51	Second adaptation of Mitsuteru Yokoyama's manga, which was serialized in Kobunsha's Shonen manga magazine from 1956 to 1966. Adapted into English as The New Adventures of Gigantor.
Ashita no Joe 2	Nippon TV	October 13, 1980 – August 31, 1981	47	Continuation of the second half of the events of Tetsuya Chiba's original manga, which was serialized in Kodansha's Weekly Shonen Magazine from 1968 to 1973.
Ohayo! Spank	TV Asahi	March 7, 1981 – May 29, 1982	63	Adapted from the original manga by Shun'ichi Yukimuro and Shizue Takanashi, which was serialized in Kodansha's Nakayoshi manga magazine for girls from 1979 to 1982.
Shin Dokonjō Gaeru	NTV	September 7, 1981 – March 29, 1982	30	Second adaptation of Dokonjō Gaeru.
Ulysses 31	France 3 (France)	October 3, 1981 – November 30, 1982	26	co-production with DIC Audiovisuel
Six God Combination Godmars	Nippon TV	October 2, 1981 – December 24, 1982	64	Adapted from Mitsuteru Yokoyama's manga titled Mars, which was serialized in Shonen Captain from 1976 to 1977.
Jarinko Chie	MBS	October 3, 1981 – March 25, 1983	65	Adapted from Etsumi Haruki's original manga, which was serialized in Manga Action from 1978 to 1997.
Tonde Mon pe	ABC	June 5, 1982 – April 2, 1983	42	
Ninjaman Ippei	Nippon TV	October 4 – December 27, 1982	13	
Space Cobra	Fuji TV	October 7, 1982 – May 19, 1983	31	Adapted from the manga, Space Adventure Cobra, by Buichi Terasawa, which was serialized in Shueisha's Weekly Shonen Jump from 1978 to 1984.
Lady Georgie	TV Asahi	April 9, 1983 – February 25, 1984	45	
The Super Dimension Century Orguss	MBS	July 3, 1983 – April 8, 1984	35	Second installment of Big West's Super Dimension trilogy, the other two of which, Macross and The Southern Cross are produced by Studio Nue, in association with Tatsunoko Production. The only Super Dimension series which was not adapted into Robotech by Harmony Gold USA.
Cat's Eye	Nippon TV	July 11, 1983 – July 8, 1985	73	Adapted from Tsukasa Hojo's manga of the same name, which was serialized in Shueisha's Weekly Shonen Jump from 1981 to 1985.
Lupin III Part III	Yomiuri TV	March 3, 1984 – December 25, 1985	50	
God Mazinger	Nippon TV	April 5 – October 23, 1984	23	
Mighty Orbots	ABC Television Network	September 8 – December 15, 1984	13	co-production with MGM Television and Intermedia Entertainment
Sherlock Hound	TV Asahi; Rai 1	November 6, 1984 – May 21, 1985	26	Co-production with the Italian public broadcasting corporation Rai
Onegai! Samia Don	NHK	April 2, 1985 – February 4, 1986	39	Adapted from the novel Five Children and It (1902) by E. Nesbit.
Robotan	Yomiuri TV	January 6 – September 20, 1986	33	Second adaptation of Morita Kenji's original manga.
Honey Bee in Toycomland (Bug-tte Honey)	Nippon TV	October 3, 1986 – September 25, 1987	51	Based on the Adventure Island video game by Hudson Soft.
Anpanman	Nippon TV	October 3, 1988 – present		

==== 1990s ====
Title	Broadcast network(s)	Year(s)	Episodes	Note(s)
Mischievous Twins: The Tales of St. Clare's	Nippon TV	January 5 – November 2, 1991	26	Adapted from St. Clare's books by Enid Blyton.
Kinkyū Hasshin Saver Kids	TV Tokyo	February 19, 1991 – February 18, 1992	50	Original series
Reporter Blues	NHK	October 3 – November 8, 1991	52	Original series
Chie-chan Funsenki: Jarinko Chie	MBS	October 19, 1991 – September 22, 1992	39	An adaptation of the first series, with different characters and an alternate setting.
I and Myself: The Two Lottes	Nippon TV	November 9, 1991 – September 5, 1992	29	Adapted from the novel, Lottie and Lisa by Erich Kästner
Tetsujin 28 FX	Nippon TV	April 5, 1992 – March 30, 1993	47	Second adaptation of Tetsujin 28-gou.
Boku no Patrasche	Nippon TV	October 10, 1992 – March 27, 1993	26	Adapted from the novel A Dog of Flanders (1872) by Ouida.
Soccer Fever	NHK	April 4, 1994 – March 27, 1995	51	Original series
Red Baron	Nippon TV	April 5, 1994 – March 28, 1995	49	A remake of the 1973 live-action series Super Robot Red Baron.
Magic Knight Rayearth	Yomiuri TV	October 17, 1994 – March 13, 1995	20	Adapted from the manga by Clamp, which was serialized in Kodansha's Nakayoshi manga magazine for female readers from 1993 to 1996.
Magic Knight Rayearth II	Yomiuri TV	April 10 – November 27, 1995	29	Second season of Magic Knight Rayearth.
Virtua Fighter (anime television series)	TV Tokyo	October 9, 1995 – June 27, 1996	35	Adapted from Sega's fighting video game series of the same name.
Kaitō Saint Tail	TV Asahi	October 12, 1995 – September 12, 1996	43	Adapted from Megumi Tachikawa's original manga, which was serialized in Nakayoshi from 1994 to 1996.
Case Closed/Detective Conan	Nippon TV; Yomiuri TV	January 8, 1996 – present		Adapted from the manga by Gosho Aoyama since 1994, has been serialized in Shogakukan's Weekly Shonen Sunday.
B't X	TBS	April 6 – September 21, 1996	25	Adapted from Masami Kurumada's original manga, which was serialized in Kadokawa's Shōnen Ace from 1994 to 2000.
Wankorobe	TV Tokyo	October 6, 1996 – March 30, 1997	26	Adapted from manga of the same name by Yuriko Abe, which was serialized in Nakayoshi from 1975. Co-produced with Ajiado.
Devil Lady	MBS	October 10, 1998 – May 8, 1999	26	Adapted from Go Nagai's manga of the same name, which was serialized in Kondansha's Weekly morning from 1997 to 2000.
Monster Farm: Enbanseki no Himitsu	TBS	April 17, 1999 – March 25, 2000	48	Adapted from Tecmo's Monster Rancher video game franchise.
Cybersix	TV Tokyo	September 6 – November 29, 1999	13	Adapted from Carlos Meglia's comic strip of the same name.
Gozonji! Gekko Kamen-kun	TV Tokyo	October 3, 1999 – March 26, 2000	25	
Karakurizōshi Ayatsuri Sakon	Animax; WOWOW	October 8, 1999 – March 31, 2000	26	Adapted from manga of the same name by Takeshi Obata and Masaru Miyazaki, which was serialized in Shueisha's Weekly Shōnen Jump from 1995 to 1996.
Shūkan Storyland	Nippon TV	October 14, 1999 – September 13, 2001	56	Original series

==== 2000s ====
Title	Broadcast network(s)	Year(s)	Episodes	Note(s)
Monster Farm: Densetsu e no Michi	TBS	April 1 – September 30, 2000	25	Adapted from Tecmo's Monster Rancher video game franchise.
Tottoko Hamtaro	TV Tokyo	July 7, 2000 – March 31, 2006	296	Adapted from Ritsuko Kawai's manga of the same name, which was serialized in Shogakukan's Ciao from 1997 to 2000.
Shin Megami Tensei: Devil Children		October 7, 2000 – September 29, 2001	50	Adapted from Atlus's Megami Tensei franchise
Project ARMS	TV Tokyo	April 7 – September 29, 2001	26	Adapted from the manga of the same name by Kyoichi Nanatsuki and Ryōji Minagawa, which was serialized in Shogakukan's Weekly Shonen Sunday from 1997 to 2002.
Project ARMS: The 2nd Chapter	TV Tokyo	October 6, 2001 – March 30, 2002	26	The second chapter of Project ARMS.
Secret of Cerulean Sand	WOWOW	January 5 – June 29, 2002	26	Co-production with Telecom Animation Film
Cheeky Angel	TV Tokyo	April 7, 2002 – March 30, 2003	50	Adapted from Hiroyuki Nishimori's manga of the same name, which was serialized in Shogakukan's Weekly Shonen Sunday from 1999 to 2003.
The Star of the Giants		October 23, 2002 – January 15, 2003	13	Adapted from the manga by Ikki Kajiwara and Noboru Kawasaki, which was serialized in Kodansha's Weekly Shonen Magazine from 1966 to 1971.
Sonic X	TV Tokyo	April 6, 2003 – March 28, 2004	78	Adapted from Sega's Sonic the Hedgehog video game franchise, particularly, the events of Sonic Adventure 1 and 2, with additional characters not seen in the games.
Umeyon Ekisu		May 2 – July 27, 2003	13	Original series
Rumic Theater	TV Tokyo	July 6 – September 28, 2003	13	Adapted from Rumiko Takahashi's manga of the same name, which was serialized in Shogakukan's Big Comic Original from 1987.
Kousetsu Hyaku Monogatari	CBC	October 4 – December 27, 2003	13	Adapted from Natsuhiko Kyogoku's short stories titled The Wicked and the Damned: A Hundred Tales of Karma.
Mermaid Forest	TV Tokyo	October 5 – December 21, 2003	11	Adapted from Rumiko Takahashi's manga of the same name, which was serialized in Shogakukan's Shōnen Sunday Zōkan and Weekly Shōnen Sunday from 1984 to 1994.
PoPoLoCrois (2nd Series)		October 5, 2003 – March 28, 2004	26	Adapted from Yohsuke Tamori's manga of the same name, which was serialized in The Asahi Shimbun Company's The Asahi Shimbun Student Newspaper from 1984.
Uninhabited Planet Survive!	NHK	October 16, 2003 – October 28, 2004	52	Original series. Made by TMS's subsidiary, Telecom Animation Film, and co-produced with Madhouse.
Aishiteruze Baby	Animax	April 3 – October 9, 2004	26	Adapted from Yōko Maki's manga of the same name, which was serialized in Shueisha's Ribon from 2002 to 2005.
Monkey Punch Manga Katsudō Daishashin	WOWOW	August 1, 2004 – June 25, 2005	12	Adapted from various short stories that were created by Monkey Punch.
Gallery Fake	TV Tokyo	January 9 – September 25, 2005	37	Adapted from Fujihiko Hosono's manga of the same name, which was serialized in Shogakuan's Weekly Big Comic Spirits (1992–2005, 2012, 2016) and Big Comic Zokan (2017–present)
Buzzer Beater	WOWOW	February 5 – April 30, 2005	13	Adapted from Takehiko Inoue's manga of the same name, which was serialized in Shueisha's Monthly Shōnen Jump from 1996 to 1998.
Mushiking: King of the Beetles	TV Tokyo	April 6, 2005 – March 29, 2006	52	Adapted from Sega's card game of the same name.
Glass Mask	TV Tokyo	April 6, 2005 – March 29, 2006	51	Adapted from Suzue Miuchi's manga of the same name, which was serialized in Hakusensha's Hana to Yume from 1976.
The Snow Queen	NHK	May 22, 2005 – February 12, 2006	36	Adapted from Hans Christian Andersen's fairy tale of the same name.
Angel Heart	Nippon TV	October 4, 2005 – September 26, 2006	50	Adapted from Tsukasa Hojo's manga of the same name, which was serialized in Shinchosha's Weekly Comic Bunch from 2001 to 2010.
Fighting Beauty Wulong	TV Tokyo	October 10, 2005 – March 26, 2006	25	Adapted from Yūgo Ishikawa's manga of the same name, which was serialized in Shogakukan's Weekly Young Sunday from 2002 to 2007.
Kakutou Bijin Wulong: Rebirth	TV Tokyo	April 2 – October 1, 2006	25	Second season of Fighting Beauty Wulong.
D.Gray-man	TV Tokyo	October 3, 2006 – September 30, 2008	103	Adapted from Katsura Hoshino's manga of the same name, which has been serialized across Shueisha's Jump line of manga magazines for young boys, beginning with Weekly Shonen Jump from 2004 to 2009, and Jump SQ as of 2019.
Pururun! Shizuku-Chan	TV Tokyo	October 7, 2006 – September 29, 2007	51	Adapted from Q-LiA's children's book series.
Kenichi: The Mightiest Disciple	TV Tokyo	October 8, 2006 – September 30, 2007	50	Adapted from Syun Matsuena's manga of the same name, which was serialized in Shogakukan's Weekly Shonen Sunday manga magazine from 2002 to 2014.
Bakugan Battle Brawlers	TV Tokyo	April 5, 2007 – March 27, 2008	52	Original series. Co-production with Teletoon, Nelvana, Japan Vistec, Spin Master Entertainment, Sega Toys and Sega.
Kaze no Shōjo Emily	NHK	April 7 – September 29, 2007	26	Adapted from Lucy Maud Montgomery's novel of the same name.
Buzzer Beater (Season 2)	Nippon TV; Yomiuri TV	July 4 – September 26, 2007	13	Second season of Buzzer Beater.
Mameushi-kun	Television Kanagawa	October 6, 2007 – September 27, 2008	52	
Pururun! Shizuku-chan Aha	AT-X	October 7, 2007 – September 28, 2008	51	Second season of Pururun! Shizuku-Chan
Noramimi	Tokyo MX	January 9 – March 26, 2008	12	Adapted from Kazuo Hara's manga of the same name, which was serialized in Shogakukan's Monthly Ikki from 2002 to 2009.
Itazura na Kiss	TBS	April 5 – September 25, 2008	25	Adapted from Kaoru Tada's manga of the same name, which was serialized in Shueisha's Bessatsu Margaret from 1990 to 1999.
Telepathy Shōjo Ran	NHK	June 21 – December 20, 2008	26	Adapted from Atsuko Asano's novel of the same name.
Scarecrowman	Animax	July 3 – December 25, 2008	26	Original series
Live On Cardliver Kakeru	TV Tokyo	October 5, 2008 – September 27, 2009	51	
Mamegoma	Chiba TV	January 10 – December 26, 2009	51	Based on San-X's series of seal characters.
Examurai Sengoku		January 11 – June 25, 2009	24	
Genji Monogatari Sennenki	Fuji TV	January 16 – March 27, 2009	11	Adapted from Waki Yamato's manga of the same name, which was serialized in Kondansha's Mimi from 1979 to 1993. Co-production with Tezuka Productions.
Rose O'Neill Kewpie	WOWOW	December 2, 2009 – May 26, 2010	26	

==== 2010s ====
Title	Broadcast network(s)	Year(s)	Episodes	Note(s)
Bakugan Battle Brawlers: New Vestroia	TV Tokyo	March 2, 2010 – March 5, 2011	52	Second season of Bakugan Battle Brawlers.
Lilpri	TV Asahi; AT-X; TV Tokyo	April 4, 2010 – March 27, 2011	51	Adapted from the Sega's arcade game of the same name.
Cardfight!! Vanguard	TV Asahi; AT-X; TV Tokyo	January 8, 2011 – March 31, 2012	65	Original series. Spawn the Cardfight!! Vanguard franchise in the later future.
Bakugan Battle Brawlers: Gundalian Invaders	TV Tokyo	April 3, 2011 – January 22, 2012	39	Third season of Bakugan Battle Brawlers.
Battle Girls: Time Paradox	AT-X; TV Tokyo	April 5 – June 28, 2011	13	Adapted from the Heiwa's pachinko game series.
Brave 10	Animax	January 8 – March 25, 2012	12	Adapted from Kairi Shimotsuki's manga of the same name.
Zetman	Tokyo MX	April 3 – June 26, 2012	13	Adapted from Masakazu Katsura's manga of the same name, which was serialized in Shueisha's Weekly Young Jump from 2002 to 2014.
Lupin the Third: The Woman Called Fujiko Mine	Nippon TV	April 5 – June 28, 2012	13	Adapted from Monkey Punch's original manga, which was serialized in Futabasha's Weekly Manga Action manga magazine for adult male readers from 1967 to 1969. Co-production with Po10tial.
Cardfight!! Vanguard: Asia Circuit-hen	TV Tokyo	April 8, 2012 – January 2, 2013	39	Sequel of Cardfight!! Vanguard.
Kamisama Kiss	TV Tokyo	October 2 – December 25, 2012	13	Adapted from Julietta Suzuki's manga of the same name, which was serialized in Hakusensha's Hana to Yume from 2008 to 2016.
Bakumatsu Gijinden Roman	AT-X; TV Tokyo	January 8 – March 26, 2013	12	Adapted from CR Ginroku Gijinden Roman pachinko game.
Cardfight!! Vanguard: Link Joker-hen	TV Tokyo	January 13, 2013 – March 2, 2014	59	Sequel of Cardfight!! Vanguard: Asia Circuit.
Anisava		August 26, 2013 – January 13, 2014	13	Co-production with DLE
Yowamushi Pedal	AT-X; TV Tokyo	October 8, 2013 – July 1, 2014	38	Adapted from Wataru Watanabe's manga of the same name, which was serialized in Akita Shoten's Weekly Shōnen Champion from 2008.
The Pilot's Love Song	AT-X; Tokyo MX	January 6 – March 31, 2014	13	Adapted from Koroku Inumura's light novel of the same name, which was serialized in Shogakukan's Gagaga Bunko from 2009 to 2011.
Cardfight!! Vanguard Legion Mate	TV Tokyo	March 9 – October 19, 2014	33	Sequel of Cardfight!! Vanguard: Link Joker.
Hero Bank	TV Tokyo	April 7, 2014 – March 30, 2015	51	Adapted from game of the same name by Sega.
Gugure! Kokkuri-san	AT-X; TV Tokyo	October 6 – December 22, 2014	12	Adapted from Midori Endō's manga of the same name, which was serialized in Square Enix's Gangan Joker from 2011 to 2016.
Yowamushi Pedal: Grande Road	TV Tokyo	October 7, 2014 – March 31, 2015	24	Second season of Yowamushi Pedal.
Sega Hard Girls	Animax; Tokyo MX; Tochigi TV	October 8 – December 24, 2014	13	Adapted from a collaboration between ASCII Media Works' Dengeki Bunko imprint and Sega.
Cardfight!! Vanguard G	BS Japan; TV Tokyo	October 26, 2014 – October 4, 2015	48	Sequel of Cardfight!! Vanguard: Legion Mate.
Kamisama Kiss◎	Animax	January 6 – March 31, 2015	12	Second season of Kamisama Kiss.
My Monster Secret	TV Tokyo; TVO; TVQ; TVh; TVA; TSC; AT-X	July 7 – September 29, 2015	13	Adapted from Eiji Masuda's manga of the same name, which was serialized in Akita Shoten's Weekly Shōnen Champion from 2013 to 2017.
Lupin the Third Part 4	Nippon TV	October 2, 2015 – March 18, 2016	24	Fifth installment of the Lupin III series created by Monkey Punch.
Cardfight!! Vanguard G: GIRS Crisis-hen	Crunchyroll; Daisuki; YouTube	October 11, 2015 – April 10, 2016	26	The first half of the second season of Cardfight!! Vanguard G series.
Bakuon!!	Animax; Sun TV; Tokyo MX	April 5 – June 21, 2016	12	Adapted from Mimana Orimoto's manga of the same name, which was serialized in Akita Shoten's Young Champion Retsu from 2011.
Cardfight!! Vanguard G: Stride Gate-hen	TV Tokyo	April 17 – September 25, 2016	24	The second half of the second season of Cardfight!! Vanguard G series.
Kamiwaza Wanda	TBS	April 23, 2016 – March 25, 2017	47	Adapted from Maeda-kun's manga of the same name, which was serialized in Shogakukan's CoroCoro Ichiban from 2016.
ReLIFE	Tokyo MX; GYT; GTV; BS11; AT-X	July 2 – September 24, 2016	13	Adapted from Sō Yayoi's manga of the same name, which was serialized in Earth Star Entertainment's Comico Japan from 2013 to 2018.
Orange	Tokyo MX; AT-X; BS11; TVA; ABC; TSB	July 4 – September 26, 2016	13	Adapted from Ichigo Takano's manga of the same name, which was serialized in Shueisha's Monthly Action from 2012 to 2022.
Bananya	Sun TV	July 4 – September 26, 2016	13	Original series
Sweetness and Lightning	Tokyo MX; Yomiuri TV; BS11	July 5 – September 20, 2016	12	Adapted from Gido Amagakure's manga of the same name, which was serialized in Kondansha's Good! Afternoon from 2013 to 2018.
D.Gray-man Hallow	TV Tokyo	July 5 – September 27, 2016	13	Sequel to D.Gray-man anime series
Pittanko! Nekozakana		October 2, 2016 – September 17, 2017	50	Original series
Ohayou! Kokekkou-san		October 2 – September 17, 2016	50	Original series
Kimoshiba		October 2 – December 25, 2016	13	Original series
Trickster		October 4, 2016 – March 28, 2017	24	Original series. Co-production with Shin-Ei Animation.
Nobunaga no Shinobi		October 4, 2016 – March 28, 2017	26	Adapted from Naoki Shigeno's manga of the same name, which was serialized in Hakusensha's Young Animal from 2008.
All Out!!		October 7, 2016 – March 31, 2017	25	Co-production with Madhouse.
Yowamushi Pedal: New Generation	TV Tokyo	January 10, 2017 – June 26, 2017	25	Third series in the Yowamushi Pedal franchise; Third adaptation of the Yowamushi Pedal series appearing in Akita Shoten's shōnen manga magazine Weekly Shōnen Champion by Wataru Watanabe; published by Akita Shoten
Clean Freak! Aoyama-kun	Tokyo MX; Yomiuri TV; BS11	July 2, 2017 – September 17, 2017	12	Adapted from Taku Sakamoto's manga of the same name.
Fastest Finger First	Nippon TV	July 4, 2017 – September 19, 2017	12	Based on the manga of the same name appearing in Kadowkawa Shoten's monthly seinen magazine Young Ace by Iqura Sugimoto; published by Kadokawa Shoten; co-production with Double Eagle
Yowamushi Pedal: Glory Line	TV Tokyo	January 8, 2018 – June 25, 2018	25	Fourth series in the Yowamushi Pedal franchise; Forth adaptation of the Yowamushi Pedal series appearing in Akita Shoten's shōnen manga magazine Weekly Shōnen Champion by Wataru Watanabe; published by Akita Shoten
Megalobox	TBS; BS-TBS	April 6, 2018 – June 29, 2018	13	
The Thousand Musketeers	Tokyo MX; Sun TV; TVA; BS11	July 3, 2018 – September 25, 2018	13	Adapted from Miki Daichi's manga of the same name.
Space Bug/The Journey Home		–		
Between the Sky and Sea	Tokyo MX	October 4, 2018 – December 20, 2018		An adaptation of the mobile video game of the same name by ForwardWorks
Bakugan: Battle Planet	TV Tokyo/YouTube; Teletoon/YTV (Canada)	December 31, 2018 – March 1, 2023	169	A reboot of the Bakugan) franchise by Sega Toys and Spin Master; co-production with Spin Master Entertainment and Nelvana
Meiji Tokyo Renka	Tokyo MX	January 9, 2019 – March 27, 2019	12	Based on the visual novel mobile game of the same name by Mages; published by Dwango
Fruits Basket	TV Tokyo; Crunchyroll & FunimationNow (United States)	6 April 2019 – 29 June 2021	63	An adaptation of the manga series of the same name by Natsuki Takaya; co-production with Apex Inc., and Funimation
Cinderella Nine	TV Tokyo	April 7, 2019 – July 7, 2019	12	An anime adaptation of the free-to-play mobile game of the same name by Akatsuki and Kadokawa
Dr. Stone	Tokyo MX; KBS; SUN; BS11; TVh; TBC; TVA; TVQ	July 5, 2019 – June 25, 2026	24	Also known as Dr Stone: Stone Wars for season 2, Dr. Stone: New World for season 3 and Dr. Stone: Science Future for the 4th & final season.; An adaptation of the manga series of the same name written by Riichiro Inagaki and illustrated by Boichi

==== 2020s ====
Title	Broadcast network(s)	Year(s)	Episodes	Note(s)
Bakugan: Armored Alliance	Amazon Prime Video	April 3, 2020 – March 26, 2021	52	Second season of Bakugan: Battle Planet.
Rent-A-Girlfriend	MBS; TBS	July 11 – September 26, 2020	12	Adapted from Reiji Miyajima's manga of the same name, which was serialized in Kondansha's Weekly Shōnen Magazine from 2017.
Burning Kabaddi	TV Tokyo; TV Osaka; TV Aichi; AT-X	April 3 – June 19, 2021	12	Adapted from Hajime Musashino's manga of the same name.
Megalobox 2: Nomad	Tokyo MX	April 4, 2021 – June 27, 2021	13	A sequel to Megalobox
Seirei Gensouki: Spirit Chronicles	TV Tokyo	July 6, 2021 – present	24	Based on the light novel series of the same name by Yuri Kitayama and illustrated by Riv; Renewed for season 3
Lupin the 3rd Part 6	Nippon TV	October 10, 2021 – March 27, 2022	24 + Episode 0	Seventh installment of the Lupin III series created by Monkey Punch.
Insect Land		–		
Detective Conan: Zero's Tea Time	Tokyo MX; ytv; BS Nippon	April 5 – May 10, 2022	6	
Detective Conan: The Culprit Hanzawa	Tokyo MX; ytv; BS Nippon	October 4 – December 20, 2022	12	
Yowamushi Pedal: Limit Break	NHK General TV	October 8, 2022 – March 25, 2023	25	
High Card	Tokyo MX	January 9, 2023 – March 25, 2024	12	co-production with Sammy Corporation, Studio Hibari and Kadokawa
I Got a Cheat Skill in Another World and Became Unrivaled in The Real World, Too	Tokyo MX; BS11; KBS Kyoto; SUN	April 7 – June 30, 2023	13	Animated by Millepensee. Adapted from Miku's light novel of the same name, which was serialized in Fujimi Shobo's Fujimi Fantasia Bunko from 2018.
Rent-A-Girlfriend 3rd Season	Crunchyroll	July 8 – September 30, 2023	12	The anime adapted chapters 104 through 167 of the Rental-a-Girlfriend manga.
Undead Unluck	MBS; TBS	October 7, 2023 – March 23, 2024	24	Animated by David Production. Adapted from Yoshifumi Tozuka's manga of the same name, which was serialized in Shueisha's Weekly Shōnen Jump from 2020.
The Seven Deadly Sins: Four Knights of the Apocalypse	TBS	October 8, 2023 – March 31, 2024	24	Animated by Telecom Animation Film. The sequel of The Seven Deadly Sins by Nakaba Suzuki which was serialized in Kondansha's Weekly Shōnen Magazine from 2021.
Rinkai!	Tokyo MX; BS Fuji	April 9 – June 25, 2024	12	
Blue Box	TBS; Netflix	October 3, 2024 – March 27, 2025	25	Animated by Telecom Animation Film. Adapted from Kouji Miura's manga of the same name, which was serialized in Shueisha's Weekly Shōnen Jump from 2021.
Honey Lemon Soda	Fuji TV (+Ultra)	January 9 – March 27, 2025	12	Animated by J.C.Staff. Adapted from Mayu Murata's manga of the same name, which was serialized in Shueisha's Ribon from 2015.
Sakamoto Days	TV Tokyo; Netflix	January 11 – March 22, 2025	11	Adapted from Yuto Suzuki's manga of the same name, which was serialized in Shueisha's Weekly Shōnen Jump from 2020.
Rent-A-Girlfriend Season 4	Crunchyroll	July 5 – September 20, 2025	12	Adapted from chapters 168-214 of the Rental-a-Girlfriend manga.
Sakamoto Days Part 2	TV Tokyo; Netflix	July 15 – September 23, 2025	11	Second cour of Sakamoto Days.
Magic Knight Rayearth	TV Asahi	October 7, 2026 – present	21	Animated by E&H Production. Reboot of the 1994 series of the same name
Shiba Inu Rooms		2027		Adaptated from the manga series.

=== Feature films ===
Title	Director(s)	Distributor	Year(s)	Note(s)
Kyojin no Hoshi: Chizome no Kesshōsen			July 26, 1969	
Kyojin no Hoshi: Ike Ike Hyūma			December 20, 1969	
Star of the Giants: Big League Ball	Tadao Nagahama	Toho	March 21, 1970	Third feature film compilation of two episodes from Star of the Giants, respectively episode 70 "Hidari Mon no Yokoku Houmuran", and episode 77 "Hanagata Sutemi no Chousen".
Attack No. 1: The Movie	Eiji Okabe	Toho	March 21, 1970	
Attack No. 1: Revolution	Eiji Okabe	Toho	August 1, 1970	
Star of the Giants: The Fateful Showdown	Tadao Nagahama	Toho	August 1, 1970	Fourth feature film compilation of two episodes from Star of the Giants, respectively episode 79 "Ourusutaa no Deki Goto", and episode 83 "Kizu Darake no Houmuin".
Attack No. 1: World Championship	Eiji Okabe	Toho	December 19, 1970	
Attack No. 1: Immortal Bird	Eiji Okabe	Toho	March 17, 1971	
Panda! Go, Panda!	Isao Takahata	Toho	December 17, 1972	featurette
Panda! Go, Panda!: The Rainy Day Circus	Isao Takahata	Toho	March 17, 1973	featurette
Lupin III	Sōji Yoshikawa	Toho	December 16, 1978	First animated feature film in Monkey Punch's Lupin III franchise; later subtitled Lupin vs. the Clone in Japanese and The Mystery of Mamo in English.
Aim for the Ace!	Osamu Dezaki	Toho	September 8, 1979	Feature film adaptation of Aim for the Ace!; acts as a complete alternate retelling of the events already established in the manga and anime.
Ganbare!! Tabuchi-kun!!	Tsutomu Shibayama	Toho-Towa	November 10, 1979	Adapted from the manga of the same series by Hisaichi Ishii, which was featured Futabasha's Weekly Manga Action magazine from 1978 to 1979; followed by two more films based on the same manga.
Lupin III: The Castle of Cagliostro	Hayao Miyazaki	Toho	December 15, 1979	Second animated feature film in Monkey Punch's Lupin III franchise, as well as Hayao Miyazaki's theatrical directorial debut.
Nobody's Boy: Remi	Osamu Dezaki, Yoshio Takeuchi	Toho	March 15, 1980	Feature film compilation of the events of Nobody's Boy: Remi.
Ganbare!! Tabuchi-kun!! 2: Gekitō Pennant Race	Tsutomu Shibayama	Toho-Towa	May 3, 1980	Second film based on the manga Ganbare!! Tabuchi-kun!!, by Hisaichi Ishii.
Makoto-chan	Tsutomu Shibayama	Toho	July 26, 1980	Adapted from the manga of the same name by Kazuo Umezu, which was serialized in Shogakukan's Weekly Shonen Sunday from 1976 to 1981.
Ganbare!! Tabuchi-kun!! Hatsu Warai 3: Aa Tsuppari Jinsei	Tsutomu Shibayama	Toho-Towa	December 13, 1980	Third film based on the manga Ganbare!! Tabuchi-kun!!, by Hisaichi Ishii.
Chie the Brat	Isao Takahata	Toho	April 11, 1981	Adapted from the manga of the same name by Etsumi Haruki, which was serialized in Futabasha's Weekly Manga Action from 1978 to 1997.
Ashita no Joe 2	Osamu Dezaki	Toho	July 4, 1981	Feature film compilation of the events of Ashita no Joe 2.
Manga Hana no Kakarichō	Noboru Ishiguro, Minoru Okazaki	Shochiku	November 28, 1981	
Manzai Taikouki	Ryuji Sawada, Hideo Takayashiki	Shochiku	November 28, 1981	
Ohayō! Spank	Shigetsugu Yoshida	Toho-Towa	March 13, 1982	Feature film adaptation of Ohayō! Spank.
Space Adventure Cobra: The Movie	Osamu Dezaki	Toho-Towa	July 3, 1982	One-time feature film adaptation of Space Adventure Cobra; covers the events of the manga's first major story arc.
Star of the Giants	Satoshi Dezaki, Tadao Nagahama		August 21, 1982	Feature film adaptation of Star of the Giants; acts as a complete alternate retelling of the events already established in the manga and anime.
God Mars: The Movie	Tetsuo Imazawa		December 18, 1982	Feature film compilation of the events of Six God Combination Godmars.
Pro Yakyū o 10-bai Tanoshiku Miru Hōhō	Kiyoshi Suzuki, Tsutomu Shibayama, Osamu Kobayashi	Toho-Towa	April 29, 1983	Adapted from the book of the same name by Takenori Emoto, which was originally published by KK Bestsellers from 1982.
Golgo 13: The Professional	Osamu Dezaki	Toho-Towa	May 28, 1983	Adapted from the manga of the same name by Takao Saito, which, since 1968, has been serialized in Shogakukan's Big Comic manga magazine for adult male readers.
Boukenshatachi: Gamba to 7-biki no Naka Ma	Shinzo Azaki		March 4, 1984	Feature film compilation of the events of Gamba no Bouken.
Meitantei Holmes: Aoi Ruby no Maki / Kaitei no Zaihō no Maki	Hayao Miyazaki	Toei Company	March 11, 1984	First feature film compilation of two episodes from Sherlock Hound, respectively episode 5 "The Adventure of the Blue Carbuncle", and episode 9 "Treasure Under the Sea". Released in Japanese cinemas alongside Topcraft's Nausicaä of the Valley of the Wind, a film also directed by Miyazaki.
Lupin III: Legend of the Gold of Babylon	Seijun Suzuki, Shigetsugu Yoshida	Toho	July 13, 1985	Third animated feature film in Monkey Punch's Lupin III franchise.
Meitantei Holmes: Mrs. Hudson Hitojichi Jiken / Dover Kaikyō no Daikūchūsen!	Hayao Miyazaki	Toei Company	August 2, 1986	Second feature film compilation of two episodes from Sherlock Hound, respectively episode 4 "Mrs. Hudson is Taken Hostage", and episode 10 "The White Cliffs of Dover". Released in Japanese cinemas alongside Studio Ghibli's Castle in the Sky, a film also directed by Miyazaki.
Treasure Island	Yoshio Takeuchi, Osamu Dezaki		May 9, 1987	Feature film compilation of the events of Treasure Island.
Akira	Katsuhiro Otomo	Toho	July 16, 1988	Adapted from the manga of the same name by Katsuhiro Otomo, who also serves as the film's director, which was serialized in Kodansha's Weekly Young Magazine from 1982 to 1990.
Let's Go! Anpanman: The Shining Star's Tear	Akinori Nagaoka	Shochiku-Fuji Ltd.	March 11, 1989	First animated feature film in the Anpanman franchise.
Onegai! Samia-don		Shochiku-Fuji Ltd.	March 11, 1989	Feature film adaptation of Onegai! Samia-don.
Robotan		Shochiku-Fuji Ltd.	March 11, 1989	Feature film adaptation of Robotan.
Little Nemo: Adventures in Slumberland	Masami Hata, William Hurtz	Toho-Towa (Japan), Hemdale Film Corporation (US, Canada)	July 15, 1989 (Japan), August 21, 1992 (US, Canada)	Japanese-American co-production. Adapted from the comic strip, Little Nemo in Slumberland by Winsor McCay which was serialized in The New York Herald from 1905 to 1913.
Ojisan Kaizō Kōza	Tsutomu Shibayama	Nippon Herald Films	February 24, 1990	
Let's Go! Anpanman: Baikinman's Counterattack	Akinori Nagaoka	Shochiku-Fuji Ltd.	July 14, 1990	
The Adventures of Gamba and Otters	Shunji Ōga	Kyodo Film	July 20, 1991	First feature film adaptation of Gamba no Bouken.
Let's Go! Anpanman: Fly! Fly! Chibigon	Akinori Nagaoka	Shochiku-Fuji Ltd.	July 20, 1991	
Let's Go! Anpanman: The Secret of Building Block Castle	Akinori Nagaoka	Shochiku-Fuji Ltd.	March 14, 1992	
Let's Go! Anpanman: Nosshi the Dinosaur's Big Adventure	Akinori Nagaoka	Shochiku-Fuji Ltd.	July 17, 1993	
Let's Go! Anpanman: The Lyrical Magical Witch's School	Akinori Nagaoka, Hiroyuki Yano	Shochiku-Fuji Ltd.	July 16, 1994	
Lupin III: Farewell to Nostradamus	Shunya Itō, Takeshi Shirato	Toho	April 22, 1995	Fourth animated feature film in Monkey Punch's Lupin III franchise.
Let's Go! Anpanman: Let's Defeat the Haunted Ship!!	Hiroyuki Yano	Shochiku-Fuji Ltd.	July 29, 1995	
Lupin III: Dead or Alive	Monkey Punch	Toho	April 20, 1996	Fifth animated feature film in Monkey Punch's Lupin III franchise.
Let's Go! Anpanman: The Flying Picture Book and the Glass Shoes	Akinori Nagaoka	Shochiku-Fuji Ltd.	July 13, 1996	
Case Closed: The Time Bombed Skyscraper	Kenji Kodama	Toho	April 19, 1997	First animated feature film in the Detective Conan/Case Closed franchise.
Let's Go! Anpanman: The Pyramid of the Rainbow	Shunji Ōga	Shochiku-Fuji Ltd.	July 28, 1997	
Case Closed: The Fourteenth Target	Kenji Kodama	Toho	April 18, 1998	
Let's Go! Anpanman: The Palm of the Hand to the Sun	Akinori Nagaoka	Shochiku-Fuji Ltd.	July 25, 1998	
Case Closed: The Last Wizard of the Century	Kenji Kodama	Toho	April 17, 1999	
Let's Go! Anpanman: When the Flower of Courage Opens	Toshiya Shinohara		July 24, 1999	
Case Closed: Captured in Her Eyes	Kenji Kodama	Toho	April 21, 2000	
Let's Go! Anpanman: The Tears of the Mermaid Princess	Akinori Nagaoka	Media Box; Tokyo Theatres	July 29, 2000	
Case Closed: Countdown to Heaven	Kenji Kodama	Toho	April 21, 2001	
Let's Go! Anpanman: Gomira's Star			July 14, 2001	
Hamtaro: Adventures in Ham-Ham Land	Osamu Dezaki	Toho	December 15, 2001	
Case Closed: The Phantom of Baker Street	Kenji Kodama	Toho	April 20, 2002	
Let's Go! Anpanman: The Secret of Roll and Roura's Floating Castle			July 13, 2002	
Hamtaro: The Captive Princess	Osamu Dezaki	Toho	December 14, 2002	
Detective Conan: Crossroad in the Ancient Capital	Kenji Kodama	Toho	April 19, 2003	
Let's Go! Anpanman: Ruby's Wish			July 12, 2003	
Hamtaro: Miracle in Aurora Valley	Osamu Dezaki	Toho	December 13, 2003	
Detective Conan: Magician of the Silver Sky	Yasuichiro Yamamoto	Toho	April 17, 2004	
Let's Go! Anpanman: Nyanii of the Country of Dream Cats			July 17, 2004	
Hamtaro and the Demon of the Picture Book Tower	Osamu Dezaki	Toho	December 23, 2004	
Detective Conan: Strategy Above the Depths	Yasuichiro Yamamoto	Toho	April 9, 2005	
Let's Go! Anpanman: Happy's Big Adventure			July 16, 2005	
Mushiking: The Road to the Greatest Champion	Shunji Ōga		December 17, 2005	
Detective Conan: The Private Eyes' Requiem	Yasuichiro Yamamoto	Toho	April 15, 2006	
Let's Go! Anpanman: Dolly of the Star of Life			July 15, 2006	
Mushiking Super Battle Movie: The Upgraded Armored Beetle of Darkness	Junpei Mizusaki	Shochiku	March 21, 2007	
Detective Conan: Jolly Roger in the Deep Azure	Yasuichiro Yamamoto	Toho	April 21, 2007	
Let's Go! Anpanman: Purun of the Bubble Ball	Hiroyuki Yano	Media Box; Tokyo Theatres	July 14, 2007	
Detective Conan: Full Score of Fear	Yasuichiro Yamamoto	Toho	April 19, 2008	
Let's Go! Anpanman: Rinrin the Fairy's Secret	Akinori Nagaoka	Media Box; Tokyo Theatres	July 12, 2008	
Detective Conan: The Raven Chaser	Yasuichiro Yamamoto	Toho	April 18, 2009	
Let's Go! Anpanman: Dadandan and the Twin Stars	Jun Kawagoe		July 4, 2009	
Detective Conan: The Lost Ship in the Sky	Yasuichiro Yamamoto	Toho	April 17, 2010	
Let's Go! Anpanman: Blacknose and the Magical Song	Hiroyuki Yano	Media Box; Tokyo Theatres	July 10, 2010	
Detective Conan: Quarter of Silence	Yasuichiro Yamamoto, Kobun Shizuno	Toho	April 16, 2011	
Let's Go! Anpanman: Rescue! Kokorin and the Star of Miracles	Hiroyuki Yano	Tokyo Theatres	July 2, 2011	
The Princess and the Pilot	Jun Shishido	Tokyo Theatres	October 1, 2011	co-production with Madhouse
Detective Conan: The Eleventh Striker	Kobun Shizuno	Toho	April 14, 2012	
Let's Go! Anpanman: Revive Banana Island	Hiroyuki Yano	Tokyo Theatres	July 7, 2012	
Detective Conan: Private Eye in the Distant Sea	Kobun Shizuno	Toho	April 20, 2013	
Let's Go! Anpanman: Fly! The Handkerchief of Hope	Hiroyuki Yano	Tokyo Theatres	July 6, 2013	
Lupin III vs. Detective Conan: The Movie	Hajime Kamegaki	Toho	December 7, 2013	
Dimensional Sniper	Kobun Shizuno	Toho	April 19, 2014	
Lupin III: Daisuke Jigen's Gravestone	Takeshi Koike		June 21, 2014	
Let's Go! Anpanman: Apple Boy and the Wishes For Everyone	Jun Kawagoe	Tokyo Theatres	July 5, 2014	
Detective Conan: Sunflowers of Inferno	Kobun Shizuno	Toho	April 18, 2015	
Let's Go! Anpanman: Mija and the Magic Lamp	Hiroyuki Yano	Tokyo Theatres	July 4, 2015	
Case Closed: The Darkest Nightmare	Kobun Shizuno	Toho	April 16, 2016	
Let's Go! Anpanman: Nanda and Runda of the Toy Star	Jun Kawagoe	Tokyo Theatres	July 2, 2016	
Orange: Future	Naomi Nakayama, Hiroshi Hamasaki		November 18, 2016	co-production with Telecom Animation Film
Lupin III: Goemon Ishikawa's Spray of Blood	Takeshi Koike		February 4, 2017	
Case Closed: The Crimson Love Letter	Kobun Shizuno	Toho	April 15, 2017	
Let's Go! Anpanman: Bulbul's Big Treasure Hunt	Hiroyuki Yano	Tokyo Theatres	July 1, 2017	
Case Closed: Zero the Enforcer	Yuzuru Tachikawa	Toho	April 13, 2018	
Let's Go! Anpanman: Shine! Kurun and the Star of Life	Hiroyuki Yano	Tokyo Theatres	June 30, 2018	
Detective Conan: The Fist of Blue Sapphire	Chika Nagaoka	Toho	April 12, 2019	
Lupin III: Fujiko Mine's Lie	Takeshi Koike		May 31, 2019	
Let's Go! Anpanman: Sparkle! Princess Vanilla of the Land of Ice Cream	Hiroyuki Yano	Tokyo Theatres	June 28, 2019	
Detective Conan: The Scarlet Bullet	Chika Nagaoka	Toho	April 16, 2021	
Let's Go! Anpanman: Fluffy Fuwari and the Cloud Country	Jun Kawagoe	Tokyo Theatres	June 25, 2021	
Detective Conan: The Bride of Halloween	Susumu Mitsunaka	Toho	April 15, 2022	
To Me, the One Who Loved You	Ken'ichi Kasai	Toei Company	October 7, 2022	
Resident Evil: Death Island	Eiichirō Hasumi	Kadokawa Corporation	July 7, 2023	co-production with Quebico
Daisuke Jigen	Hajime Hashimoto	Prime Video	October 13, 2023	co-production with Amazon MGM Studios
Detective Conan: The Million-dollar Pentagram	Chika Nagaoka	Toho	April 12, 2024	
Anpanman: Baikinman and Lulun in the Picture Book	Jun Kawagoe	Tokyo Theatres	June 18, 2024	
Detective Conan: One-eyed Flashback	Katsuya Shigehara	Toho	April 18, 2025	
Anpanman: Chapon's Hero!	Toshikazu Hashimoto	Tokyo Theatres	June 27, 2025	
Lupin the IIIrd the Movie: The Immortal Bloodline	Takeshi Koike	Toho Next	June 27, 2025	co-production with Telecom Animation Film
Detective Conan: Fallen Angel of the Highway	Takahiro Hasui	Toho	April 10, 2026	
To You in the Beyond	Junichi Wada	Shochiku	October 9, 2026	

=== Television films and specials ===
Title	Broadcast network(s)	Year(s)
Astro Boy vs. the Giants	Nippon TV	June 9, 1969
Bōchan	Fuji TV	June 13, 1980
Nijū-yon no Hitomi	Fuji TV	October 10, 1980
Sugata Sanshirō	Fuji TV	June 8, 1981
Son Goku: Silk Road o Tobu!!	Fuji TV	June 17, 1982
Let's Go! Anpanman: Santa Claus Disappears	Nippon TV	December 19, 1988
Lupin III: Bye Bye, Lady Liberty	Nippon TV	April 1, 1989
Let's Go! Anpanman: Anpanman and the Christmas Valley	Nippon TV	December 25, 1989
Lupin III: The Hemingway Papers	Nippon TV	July 20, 1990
Let's Go! Anpanman: Scoop the South Sea!	Nippon TV	August 26, 1990
Let's Go! Anpanman: Shine! Our Christmas Tree	Nippon TV	December 24, 1990
Lupin III: Napoleon's Dictionary	Nippon TV	August 9, 1991
Let's Go! Anpanman: The Mysterious Jingle	Nippon TV	December 23, 1991
Lupin III: From Russia with Love	Nippon TV	July 24, 1992
Let's Go! Anpanman: Delivered! Our Christmas	Nippon TV	December 21, 1992
Lupin III: Voyage to Danger	Nippon TV	July 23, 1993
Let's Go! Anpanman: The South Island's White Christmas	Nippon TV	December 20, 1993
Lupin III: Dragon of Doom	Nippon TV	July 29, 1994
Let's Go! Anpanman: The 2 Panna's Christmas	Nippon TV	December 19, 1994
Lupin III: The Pursuit of Harimao's Treasure	Nippon TV	August 4, 1995
Magic Knight Rayearth: Zokan go	Nippon TV	December 16, 1995
Let's Go! Anpanman: White Keito's Christmas	Nippon TV	December 25, 1995
Lupin III: The Secret of Twilight Gemini	Nippon TV	August 2, 1996
Let's Go! Anpanman: Anpanman and the Black Christmas	Nippon TV	December 13, 1996
Lupin III: Island of Assassins	Nippon TV	August 1, 1997
Let's Go! Anpanman: The Meringue Sisters' Christmas	Nippon TV	December 25, 1997
Lupin III: Tokyo Crisis	Nippon TV	July 24, 1998
Let's Go! Anpanman: Our Christmas Concert	Nippon TV	December 24, 1998
Lupin III: Da Capo of Love: Fujiko's Unlucky Days	Nippon TV	July 30, 1999
Let's Go! Anpanman: Anpanman and Your Merry Christmas	Nippon TV	December 23, 1999
Let's Go! Anpanman: Uncle Jam Has Disappeared	Nippon TV	February 21, 2000
Lupin III: Missed by a Dollar	Nippon TV	July 28, 2000
Let's Go! Anpanman: Anpanman's Christmas Show	Nippon TV	December 21, 2000
Lupin III: Alcatraz Connection	Nippon TV	August 3, 2001
Let's Go! Anpanman: Anpanman and Small Santa's Christmas	Nippon TV	December 20, 2001
Lupin III: Episode 0: The First Contact	Nippon TV	July 26, 2002
Let's Go! Anpanman: The Flame of Courage and Christmas	Nippon TV	December 19, 2002
Lupin III: Operation Return the Treasure	Nippon TV	August 1, 2003
Let's Go! Anpanman: Black Santa and the Nice Present	Nippon TV	December 25, 2003
Lupin III: Stolen Lupin ~The Copy Cat is a Midsummer's Butterfly~	Nippon TV	July 30, 2004
Let's Go! Anpanman: Anpanman and the Star of Christmas	Nippon TV	December 24, 2004
Lupin III: An Angel's Tactics – Fragments of a Dream Are the Scent of Murder	Nippon TV	July 22, 2005
Let's Go! Anpanman: Anpanman's Jin-Jin-Jingle Bells	Nippon TV	December 23, 2005
Lupin III: Seven Days Rhapsody	Nippon TV	September 8, 2006
Let's Go! Anpanman: Sing! Dance! Everybody's Christmas	Nippon TV	December 22, 2006
Lupin III: Elusiveness of the Fog	Nippon TV	July 27, 2007
Let's Go! Anpanman: Kokin-chan and the Christmas of Tears	Nippon TV	December 21, 2007
Lupin III: Sweet Lost Night ~Magic Lamp's Nightmare Premonition~	Nippon TV	July 25, 2008
Let's Go! Anpanman: Franken-Robo-kun's Surprised Christmas	Nippon TV	December 19, 2008
Lupin III vs. Detective Conan	Nippon TV	March 27, 2009
Let's Go! Anpanman: Do Your Best Creampanda! The Christmas Adventure	Nippon TV	December 25, 2009
Lupin III: The Last Job	Nippon TV	February 12, 2010
Magic Kaito	NNS (ytv)	April 17, 2010 – December 29, 2012
Let's Go! Anpanman: Red-Nosed Chappy - The Christmas of Courage	Nippon TV	December 24, 2010
Lupin III: Blood Seal - Eternal Mermaid	Nippon TV	December 2, 2011
Let's Go! Anpanman: Anpanman and Gomira's Christmas Castle	Nippon TV	December 23, 2011
Lupin III: Record of Observations of the East	Nippon TV	November 2, 2012
Let's Go! Anpanman: Doremifa Island's Christmas	Nippon TV	December 21, 2012
Lupin III: Princess of the Breeze - Hidden City in the Sky	Nippon TV	November 15, 2013
Let's Go! Anpanman: Shine! Tin Kid's Christmas Tree	Nippon TV	December 20, 2013
Let's Go! Anpanman: Anpanman and the Letter to Santa	Nippon TV	December 19, 2014
The Disappearance of Conan Edogawa: The Worst Two Days in History	Nippon TV	December 26, 2014
Let's Go! Anpanman: Baikinman and the Lovely Christmas Present	Nippon TV	December 18, 2015
Lupin III: Italian Game	Nippon TV	January 8, 2016
Case Closed Episode One: The Great Detective Turned Small	Nippon TV	December 9, 2016
Let's Go! Anpanman: Poppo's Christmas Twinkle	Nippon TV	December 23, 2016
Lupin III: Goodbye Partner	Nippon TV	January 25, 2019
Lupin III: Prison of the Past	Nippon TV	November 29, 2019

=== Original video animations ===
Title	Broadcast network(s)	Year(s)
2001 Nights		1987
The Fuma Conspiracy		December 1987
Ace o Nerae! 2: Stage 1–6		March 1988
The Untold Legend		June 1988
Ace o Nerae!: Final Stage		1989
Tengai makyo: Jiraiya Oboro Hen		July 1990
(Office Lady) Kaizō Kōza		November 1990
Katsugeki Shōjo Tanteidan		December 1990
Wizardry		February 1991
Shizuka Narudon		April 1991
Ozanari Dungeon		September 1991
Christmas Da! Minna Atsumare! (annual Christmas releases)		1992–present
Maps		1994
Otanjōbi Series		1995
Magic Knight Rayearth		July 1997
B't X NEO		August 1997
Glass Mask: Sen no Kamen o Motsu Shōjo		1998
Aoyama Gōshō Tanhenshū		1999
Karakuri no Kimi		2000
Let's Go! Anpanman: Song and Dance Fun		March 20, 2000
Hamtaro Premium (4 OVAs)		2002–2004
Return of the Magician		2002
Azusa, Otetsudai Shimasu!		2004
Saint Seiya: The Lost Canvas		2009–2011

=== Original net animations ===
Title	Broadcast network(s)	Year(s)	Notes
Susume! Gachimuchi Sankyoudai		June 2, 2010	
Joshikousei Nobunaga-chan!!		August 12, 2010 – February 10, 2012	
Detective Conan vs. Wooo		April 22 – June 23, 2011	This web short is an advertisement for the Wooo line of televisions in Japan.
Kubbe Kort Animasjon		April 24, 2013 – March 30, 2014	
Meitantei Conan: Toubousha Mouri Kogorou		April 30, 2014	
Kubbe no Ongakukai		October 8, 2014 – March 5, 2019	
Chichibu de Buchichi		March 30, 2018	with 8PAN
Baki	Netflix	June 25 – December 17, 2018	with Double Eagle
#Compass		August 10, 2018 – September 13, 2019	
Bakugan Battle Brawlers: Mechtanium Surge		September 7, 2018	
Bakugan: Battle Planet Short Anime	YouTube	April 18 – October 17, 2019	
Re:STARS		December 27, 2019 – March 20, 2020	
Baki: The Great Raitai Tournament Saga	Netflix	June 4, 2020	
Bakugan: Geogan Rising	Netflix	April 2, 2021 – March 18, 2022	
Resident Evil: Infinite Darkness	Netflix	July 8, 2021	With Quebico
Hanma Baki: Son of Ogre	Netflix	September 30, 2021	
Bakugan: Evolutions	YouTube; Netflix	February 6 – September 1, 2022	
Kanojo, Okarishimasu 2nd Season: Date Movie		May 25 – September 25, 2022	Studio provided by AQUA ARIS
Lupin Zero	HIDIVE	December 16, 2022 – January 13, 2023	
Lupin III vs. Cat's Eye	Amazon Prime Video	January 27, 2023	Crossover between Lupin The Third and Cat's Eye series.
Bakugan: Legends	YouTube; Netflix	March 1, 2023	Fifth and final season of Bakugan: Battle Planet.
Hanma Baki: Son of Ogre 2nd Season	Netflix	July 26 – August 24, 2023	
Hanma Baki vs. Kengan Ashura	Netflix	June 9, 2024	A crossover anime movie between Hanma Baki and Kengan Ashura.

=== Video games ===
Title	Developer	Contribution	Year
Cliff Hanger	Stern Electronics	Development (Note: As this game is a derivative work based on footage from the Lupin III films The Castle of Cagliostro and The Mystery of Mamo, TMS technically also contributed animation to the game. As part of their involvement, they were responsible for the game's title and certain character names, some of which were repurposed from an obscure English-subtitled release of Cagliostro. This version of the film, titled Cliff Hanger II: Cagliostro Castle, was only screened at select film festivals such as the World Science Fiction Convention in 1980 and FILMEX in 1982.)	1983
Don Quixote: A Dream in Seven Crystals	Premier International Corp.	Animation	1994
The Adventures of Batman & Robin	Clockwork Tortoise	Lost episode cutscenes	1995
Astal	Sega	Cutscenes	1995
Last Bronx	Sega AM3	Cutscenes	1996
Sakura Wars	Red Company; Sega CS2 R&D	Cutscenes	1996
Sonic Jam	Sonic Team	Man of the Year short	1997
Grandia	Game Arts	CG animation (as Telecom Animation Film Company)	1997
Burning Rangers	Sonic Team	Cutscenes	1998
Lupin the 3rd: Sage of the Pyramid	Asmik Ace Entertainment	Cutscenes	1998
Magic Knight Rayearth	Working Designs	Animation Production	1998
Kingdom Hearts	Square	outside contractor: animation supervisor (as Telecom Animation Film Company)	2002
PopoloCrois	G-artists; Sony Computer Entertainment	Animation	2005
Return to PopoloCrois	epics Marvelous AQL	Animation	2015
Tokyo Afterschool Summoners	LifeWonders	Opening Animation	2019

== Foreign production history ==
=== TMS Entertainment/Telecom Animation Film ===
Title	Broadcast network(s)	Year(s)
Mighty Orbots	ABC	September 8, 1984 – December 15, 1984
Sherlock Hound	Rai 1 / TV Asahi	November 6, 1984 – May 21, 1985
Sweet Sea		September 9, 1985
The Blinkins		April 5, September 6, November 29, 1986
Galaxy High School	CBS	September 13 – December 6, 1986
Little Nemo: Adventures in Slumberland		July 15, 1989
Reporter Blues	Rai 1 / NHK	1991–1996
Soccer Fever	Rai 1 / NHK	April 4, 1994 – April 3, 1995
Cybersix (Japanese-Canadian co-production with Network of Animation (NoA))	Teletoon / Kids Station / Telefe	September 6 – November 29, 1999

=== DIC Audiovisuel/DIC Entertainment ===
Title	Broadcast network(s)	Year(s)
Ulysses 31	FR3 / Nagoya Broadcasting Network	October 10, 1981 – April 3, 1982
Lupin VIII	unaired	1982 (unaired)
Inspector Gadget (Season 1)	Syndication	September 5, 1983 – November 13, 1985
The Littles	ABC	September 10, 1983 – November 2, 1985
Rainbow Brite	Syndication	June 27, 1984 – July 24, 1986
Heathcliff and the Catillac Cats	Syndication	September 3, 1984 – September 30, 1985
Here Come the Littles		May 24, 1985
The Real Ghostbusters	ABC	September 13, 1986 – October 5, 1991
Kissyfur	NBC	September 13, 1986 – August 25, 1990
Dennis the Menace	Syndication	September 22, 1986 – March 26, 1988
Sylvanian Families	Syndication	September 18 – December 11, 1987
ALF: The Animated Series	NBC	September 26, 1987 – January 7, 1989
Adventures of Sonic the Hedgehog	Syndication	September 6, 1993 – November 24, 1996

=== Disney Television Animation ===
Title	Broadcast network(s)	Year(s)
The Wuzzles	CBS	September 14 – December 7, 1985
Disney's Adventures of the Gummi Bears (Season 1 to 4)	NBC; ABC	September 14, 1985 – February 22, 1991
Fluppy Dogs	ABC	November 27, 1986
DuckTales (Season 1)	Syndication	September 18, 1987 – November 28, 1990
The New Adventures of Winnie the Pooh (Season 1 and half of Season 2)	The Disney Channel; ABC	January 17, 1988 – October 26, 1991
Chip 'n Dale Rescue Rangers (Season 1)	The Disney Channel; Syndication	August 27, 1988 – November 19, 1990
Gargoyles (Assistance for Walt Disney Animation Japan, "Hunter's Moon, Part 2")	Syndication; ABC	October 24, 1994 – February 15, 1997
Winnie the Pooh: Seasons of Giving (Assistance for Walt Disney Animation Australia)	Direct to Video	November 9, 1999
The Tigger Movie (Assistance for Walt Disney Animation Japan)		February 11, 2000

=== Warner Bros. Animation ===
Title	Broadcast network(s)	Year(s)
Tiny Toon Adventures	Syndication / Fox Kids	September 14, 1990 – May 28, 1995
Tiny Toon Adventures: How I Spent My Vacation	Direct to Video	March 11, 1992
Batman: The Animated Series	Fox Kids	September 5, 1992 – September 15, 1995
Animaniacs	Fox Kids / The WB	September 13, 1993 – November 14, 1998
Pinky and the Brain ("A Pinky and the Brain Christmas")	The WB	September 9, 1995 – November 14, 1998
The Sylvester and Tweety Mysteries (First season)	The WB	September 9, 1995 – December 18, 2002
Superman: The Animated Series	The WB	September 6, 1996 – February 12, 2000
Waynehead (Opening)	The WB	October 19, 1996 – May 17, 1997
The New Batman Adventures	The WB	September 13, 1997 – January 16, 1999
The Batman/Superman Movie: World's Finest	Direct to Video	October 4, 1997
Wakko's Wish	Direct to Video	December 21, 1999
Batman Beyond: Return of the Joker	Direct to Video	December 12, 2000
Green Lantern: First Flight	Direct to Video	July 28, 2009
Justice League: Doom	Direct to Video	February 28, 2012
Superman vs. The Elite	Direct to Video	June 12, 2012

=== Other productions ===
Title	Production company(s)	Year(s)
The New Adventures of Zorro	Filmation	September 12 – December 5, 1981
The Adventures of the Galaxy Rangers	Gaylord Entertainment Company	September 14 – December 11, 1986
Bionic Six	MCA Television	April 6 − November 12, 1987
Visionaries: Knights of the Magical Light	Sunbow Productions	September 21 – December 14, 1987
Fox's Peter Pan & the Pirates	Fox Children's Productions; Southern Star Productions	September 8, 1990 – September 10, 1991
Spider-Man: The Animated Series	Marvel Films Animation	November 19, 1994 – January 31, 1998
An American Tail 3: The Treasure of Manhattan Island	Universal Cartoon Studios	November 16, 1998

== See also ==
- Studio Ghibli, an animation studio founded by former TMS animators Hayao Miyazaki and Isao Takahata.
- Madhouse, an animation studio that was established with funding from TMS.
- Spectrum Animation, an animation studio founded by former TMS animators who helped animate several episodes of Batman: The Animated Series.
- Brain's Base, an animation studio founded by former TMS animators
- Oh! Production animation studio founded by TMS Entertainment.
