= Nogata =

There are a few different places in Japan named either Nogata (野方) or Nōgata (直方). They include the following:

- Nōgata, Fukuoka, a city in Fukuoka Prefecture
- Nogata, Tokyo, a district in Nakano, Tokyo
- Nogata, Kita-ku, Nagoya, a district in Kita-ku, Nagoya
- Nogata, Nakamura-ku, Nagoya, a district in Nakamura-ku, Nagoya
- Nogata, Ichinomiya, an area in Oku-chō, Ichinomiya, Aichi
- Nogata, Aisai, an area in Yamaji-chō, Aisai, Aichi
- Nogata, Yatomi, an area in Maegasu-chō, Yatomi, Aichi
- Nogata, Tōhaku, an area in Yurihama-chō, Tōhaku District
- Nogata, Soo, an area in Ōsaki-chō, Soo District
