= Arai, Tokyo =

District in Nakano, Tokyo, Japan

Coordinates: 35°42′53″N 139°39′46″E

Arai 新井
- Neighborhood
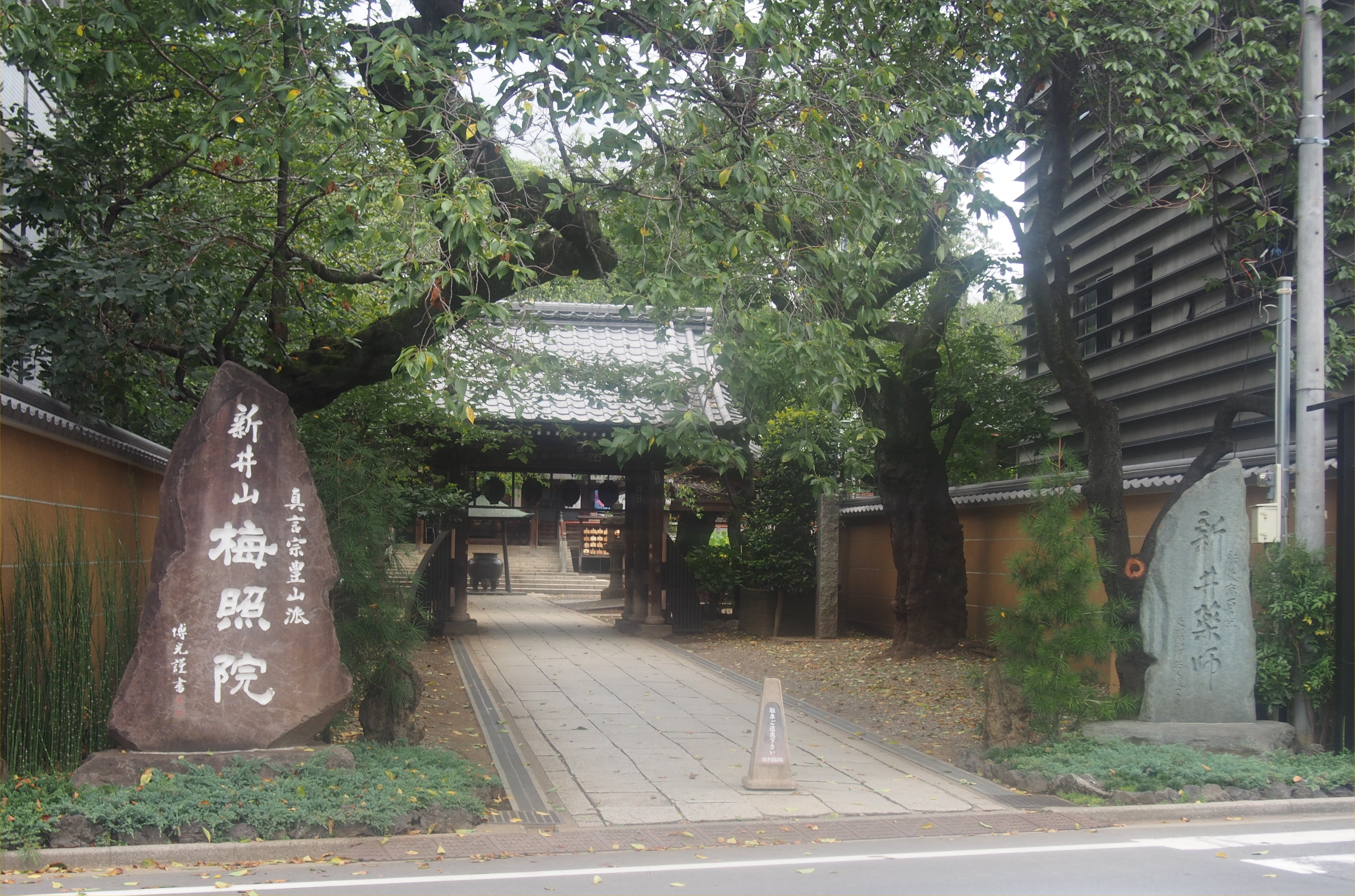
- Arai Yakushi Baishouin
- Interactive map of Arai
- Country: Japan
- Prefecture: Tokyo
- Special ward: Nakano

Population (1 October 2020)
  - Total: 18,431
- Time zone: UTC+09:00
- ZIP code: 165-0026
- Telephone area code: 03

Arai (新井) is a district of Nakano, Tokyo, Japan.

As of October 2020, the population of this district is 18,431. The postal code for Arai is 165-0026.

== Geography ==
Arai borders Numabukuro in the north, Kamitakada to the east, Nakano to the south, and Nogata to the west.

== Education ==
Nakano City Board of Education (中野区教育委員会) operates public elementary and junior high schools.

Schools in Arai:

- Heiwa-no-Mori Elementary School (中野区立平和の森小学校)

Areas zoned to Heiwa-no-Mori ES include all of 2-chome and part of 3-chome. Reiwa Elementary School (令和小学校)'s zone includes 4 and 5-chome and parts 1-chome and 3-chome. The rest of 1-chome is zoned to Momozono No. 2 Elementary (桃園第二小学校). No.5 Junior High School's zone includes all of 4 and 5-chome, and parts of 1 and 3-chome. Nakano Junior High School (中野中学校)'s zone includes parts of 1 and 2-chome. Midorino Junior High School (緑野中学校)'s zone includes parts of 2 and 3-chome.
