= Reporter Blues =

1991 Italian-Japanese animation television

レポーターブルース (Repōtā Burūsu)
- Anime television series
- Directed by: Kenji Kodama
- Produced by: Kazuhiko Yagiuchi; Kenji Mizunuma
- Written by: Marco Pagot; Gi Pagot
- Music by: Stelvio Cipriani (title music); Pino Massara (score music, Season 1); Mario Pagano (score music, Season 2)
- Studio: Tokyo Movie Shinsha
- Original network: RaiUno (Italy); NHK-BS2 (Japan)
- Original run: 1991 – 1996
- Episodes: 52

Reporter Blues (レポーターブルース, Repōtā Burūsu) is an Italian-Japanese animated television series written by Marco Pagot and Gi Pagot and directed by Kenji Kodama. It consists of 52 half-hour episodes. The first season was aired in France in 1991. The second season was aired in 1996.

The show was co-produced by RAI, Seoul Movie and Tokyo Movie Shinsha.

== Plot ==
France, 1920s or 1930s. A beautiful redhead, Antoinette "Tony" Dubois, becomes a journalist at La Voix de Paris. Tony has two passions: her cat Filippon and her saxophone which she uses to play jazz or blues. With her teammate the photographer Alain Pichet, Tony begins to frequent high society and cover important events. This is how she notices Madame Lapin, a rich woman at the head of a huge criminal cartel. Tony and Alain begin to investigate her activities to capture her. During their investigations, Tony and Alain will experience adventures in the four corners of Paris (at the Louvre, on the Eiffel Tower, at the Opéra Garnier), on the Normandy, aboard the Orient-Express, in Spain and even in America and meet many personalities of the time (Al Capone, Johnny Weissmuller, Coco Chanel, etc.).

== Characters ==
- Antoinette "Tony" Dubois: She is the main character. A newspaper reporter who moves to Paris and works on La Voix de Paris (The Voice of Paris)
- Alain Pichet: Photographer and partner of Tony
- Madame Lapin: A notorious criminal
- Monsieur Chailleau
- Inspecteur Calvignac
- Professeur

== Episodes (found in English so far) ==
- Ep. 27
- Ep. 28
- Ep. 29
- Ep. 30
- Ep. 31
- Ep. 32
- Ep. 33
- Ep. 34
- Ep. 35
- Ep. 36
- Ep. 37
- Ep. 48
- Ep. 49
  *none of these episodes have a title card

== Release ==
- Canal 9 Baba club Spain
- NHK satellite Japan
- RAI Italy
- Tooniverse Korea

== Music ==
The opening theme and the ending theme "We're going to Paris" both performed by the Italian singer Simona Patitucci. Music composed by the Italian musicians and composers Pino Massara and Stelvio Cipriani.
