= Soccer Fever =

Italian-Japanese anime television series

サッカーフィーバー (Sakkā Fībā)
- Genre: Sports
- Anime television series
- Directed by: Hitoshi Oda (Chief Director)
- Produced by: Tadahito Matsumoto
- Written by: Guerino Gentilini; Vittorio Schiraldi; Junichi Iioka
- Music by: Kiyoshi Suzuki; Mario Pagano
- Studio: Tokyo Movie Shinsha; RAI; REVER
- Original network: NHK-BS2 (Japan); Rai Uno (Italy)
- Original run: April 4, 1994 – April 3, 1995
- Episodes: 52

Soccer Fever (サッカーフィーバー) is a 1994 Italian-Japanese sports anime television series produced by Tokyo Movie Shinsha and RAI. It was broadcast by NHK and Rai Uno.

This anime is part of Eisei Anime Gekijō (衛星アニメ劇場). "Eisei Anime Gekijo" is an anthology program which broadcasts both new ongoing and older completed programs. It was started in 1990 and is broadcast by NHK-BS2.

== Plot ==
Soccer Fever revolves around a theatrical reiteration of all the stories that happened in the previous FIFA World Cups. It covers all the world cups from the 1930 edition which was held in Uruguay till the then most recent one in 1994 which was held in United States. It follows the stories revolving around the former world cup winners and the circumstances leading to their wins.

The main protagonist of the story is an ex-reporter by the name of Brian Thompson. He leads the audience into the great matches played by the various former world cup winners. In the middle we are also shown glimpses from Brian's youth. The show covers all the great players who lead their respective countries to world Cup glory.We also see the game brilliantly reborn through spectacular players like Franz Beckenbauer, Müller Gard, Eusebio and the greatest of them all, Diego Armando Maradona.
