= Nogata, Tokyo =

District in Nakano, Tokyo, Japan

Nogata 野方
- Neighborhood in Nakano
- Interactive map of Nogata
- Coordinates: 35.717°N 139.656°E
- Country: Japan
- Prefecture: Tokyo
- Special ward: Nakano

Population (1 October 2020)
  - Total: 21,573
- Time zone: UTC+09:00
- ZIP code: 165-0027
- Telephone area code: 03

Nogata (野方) is a district of Nakano, Tokyo, Japan.

As of October 2020, the population of this district is 21,573. The postal code for Nogata is 165-0027.

== Geography ==
Nogata borders Maruyama in the north, Arai and Numabukuro to the east, Nakano and Kōenji to the south, and Yamatochō, Wakamiya, and Saginomiya to the west.

== Education ==
Nakano City Board of Education (中野区教育委員会) operates public elementary and junior high schools.

Schools in Nogata:

- Kitahara Elementary School (中野区立北原小学校)

The zone for Kitahara Elementary includes 6-chome and parts of 3-5 chome. The zone for Heiwa-no-Mori Elementary School (平和の森小学校) includes parts of 1-2 and 3-chome. The zone for Keimei Elementary School (啓明小学校) includes parts of 1-2 and 5-chome. The zone of Midorino Elementary School (緑野小学校) includes a part of 4-chome.

Areas zoned to Midorino Junior High School (緑野中学校) include all of 3-4 and 6-chome, and parts of 2 and 5-chome. The zone of Nakano Junior High School (中野中学校) includes portions of 1 and 2-chome. The zone for Meiwa Junior High School (明和中学校) includes parts of 1-2 and 5-chome.
