= Nakano, Nakano, Tokyo =

District in Nakano, Tokyo, Japan

Nakano 中野
- Neighborhood in Nakano
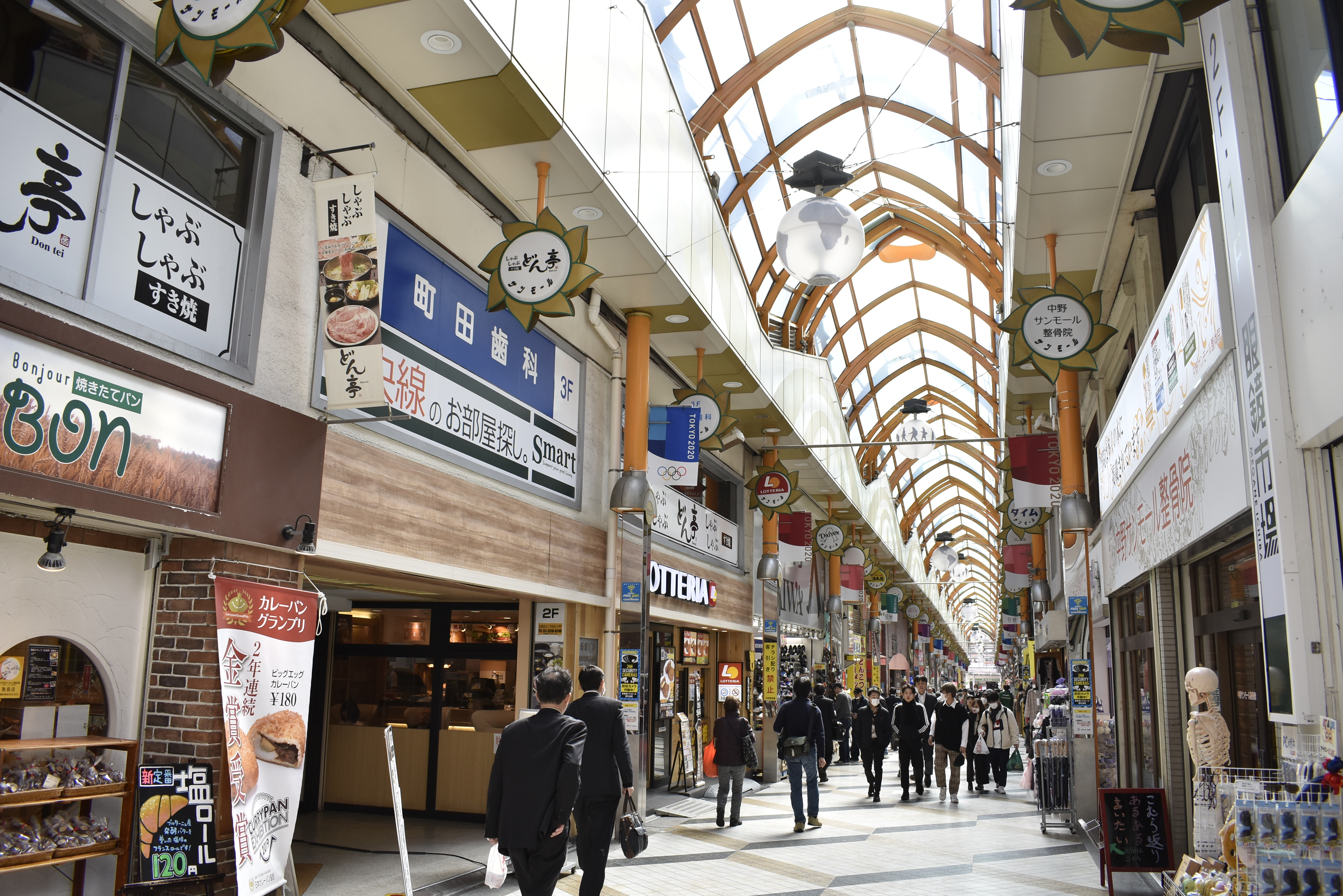
- Nakano Sun Mall
- Interactive map of Nakano
- Coordinates: 35°42′23″N 139°40′05″E
- Country: Japan
- Prefecture: Tokyo
- Special ward: Nakano

Population (1 October 2020)
  - Total: 27,358
- Time zone: UTC+09:00
- ZIP code: 164-0001
- Telephone area code: 03

Nakano (中野) is a district of Nakano, Tokyo, Japan.

As of October 2020, the population of this district is 27,358. The postal code for Nakano is 164-0001.

== Geography ==
Nakano borders Arai, Nogata, and Kamitakada in the north, Higashinakano to the east, Chūō to the south, and Kōenji to the west.

== Education ==
Nakano City Board of Education (中野区教育委員会) operates public elementary and junior high schools.

Public elementary and junior high schools in Nakano:

- Yato Elementary School (谷戸小学校)
- Momozono Daini (No. 2) Elementary School (桃園第二小学校)
- Nakano Higashi (East) Junior High School (中野東中学校)
- Nakano Junior High School (中野中学校)

1-chome is zoned to Yato Elementary. 2-3-chome are zoned to Toka Elementary School (桃花小学校). 4-chome is zoned to Heiwa-no-Mori Elementary School (平和の森小学校). 5-6-chome are zoned to Momozono Daini ES. 2-5 chome are zoned to Nakano JHS while 1 and 6 chome are zoned to Nakano Nigashi JHS.

== Gallery ==
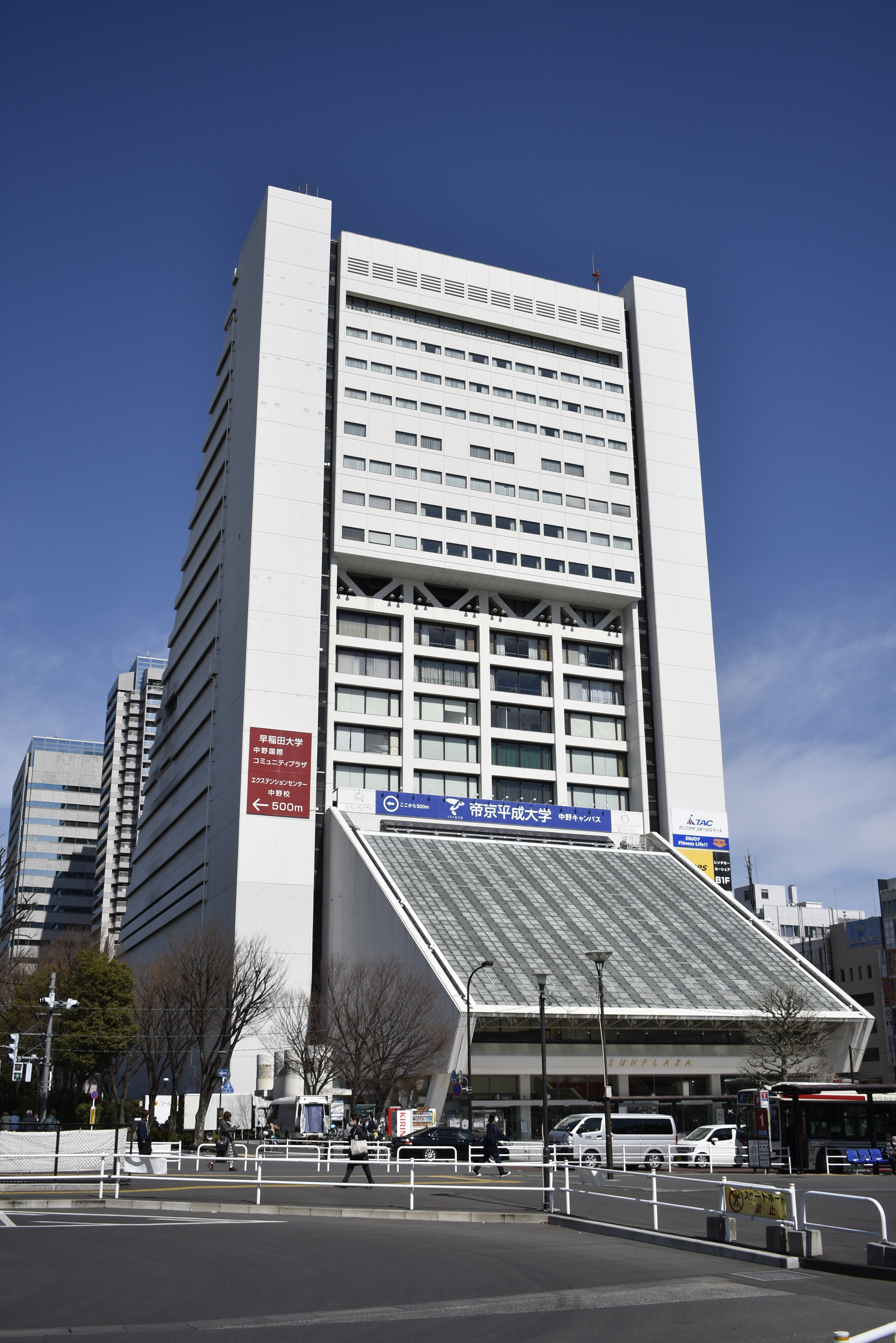
Nakano Sun Plaza

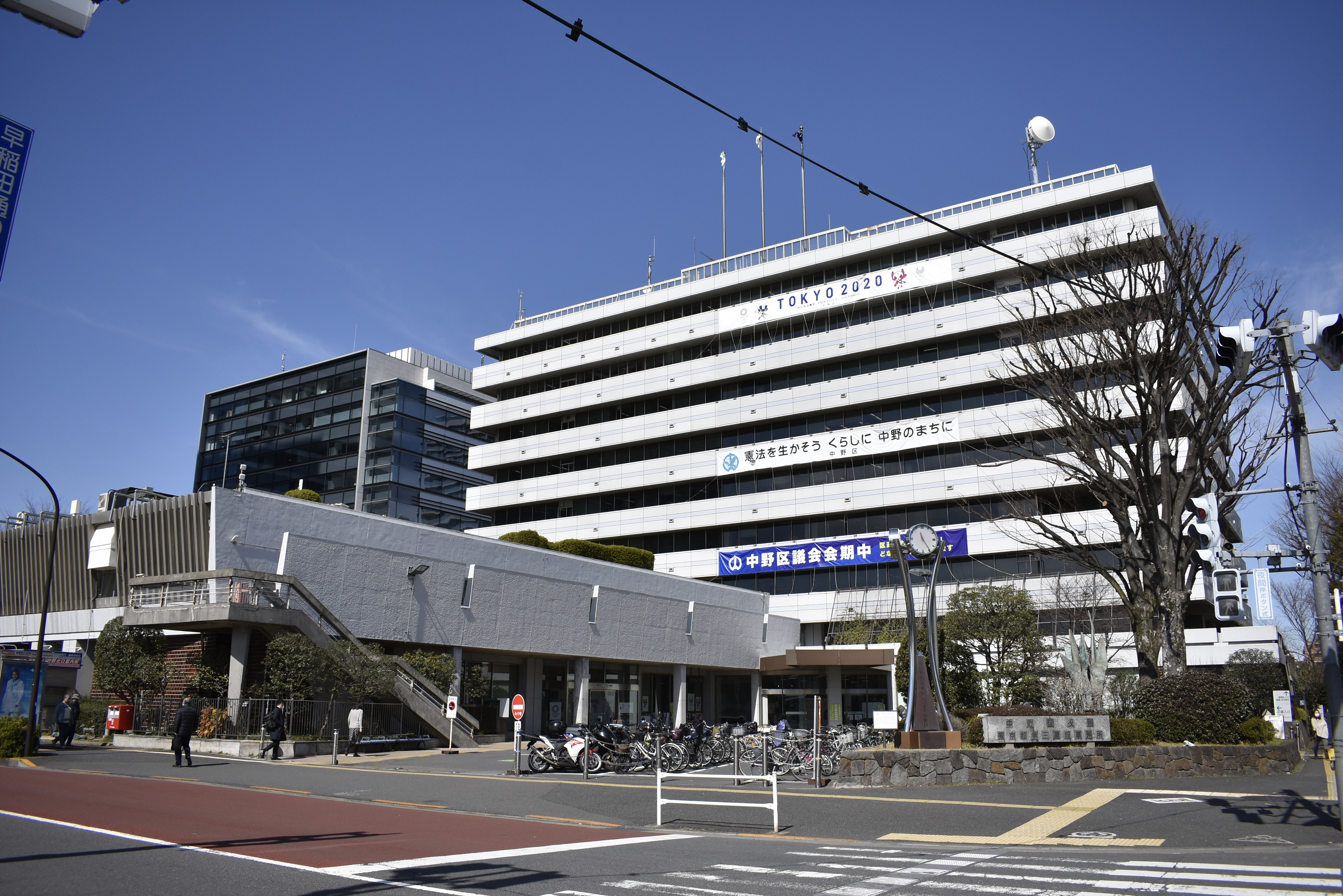
Nakano City Office

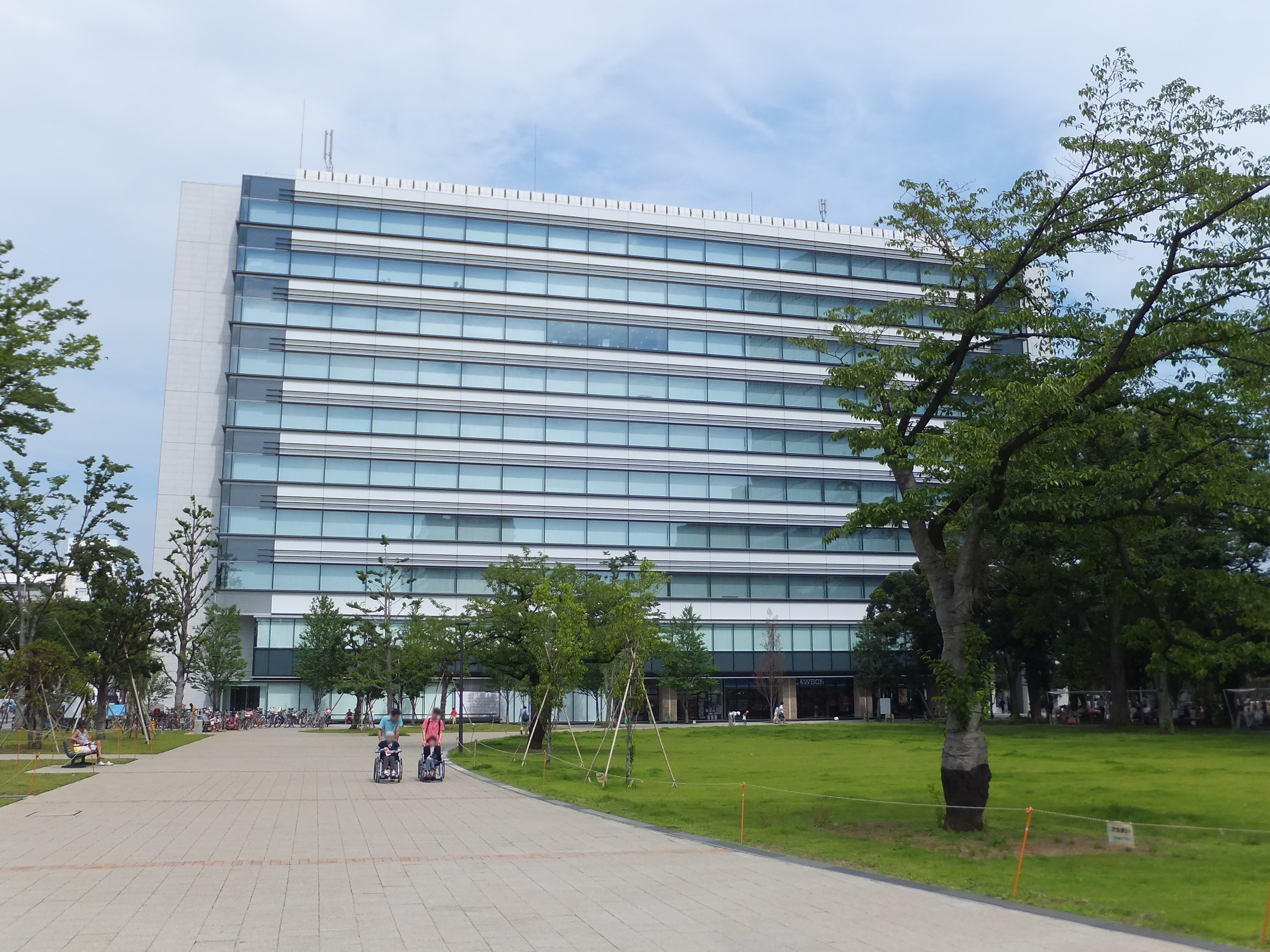
Nakano Central Park East

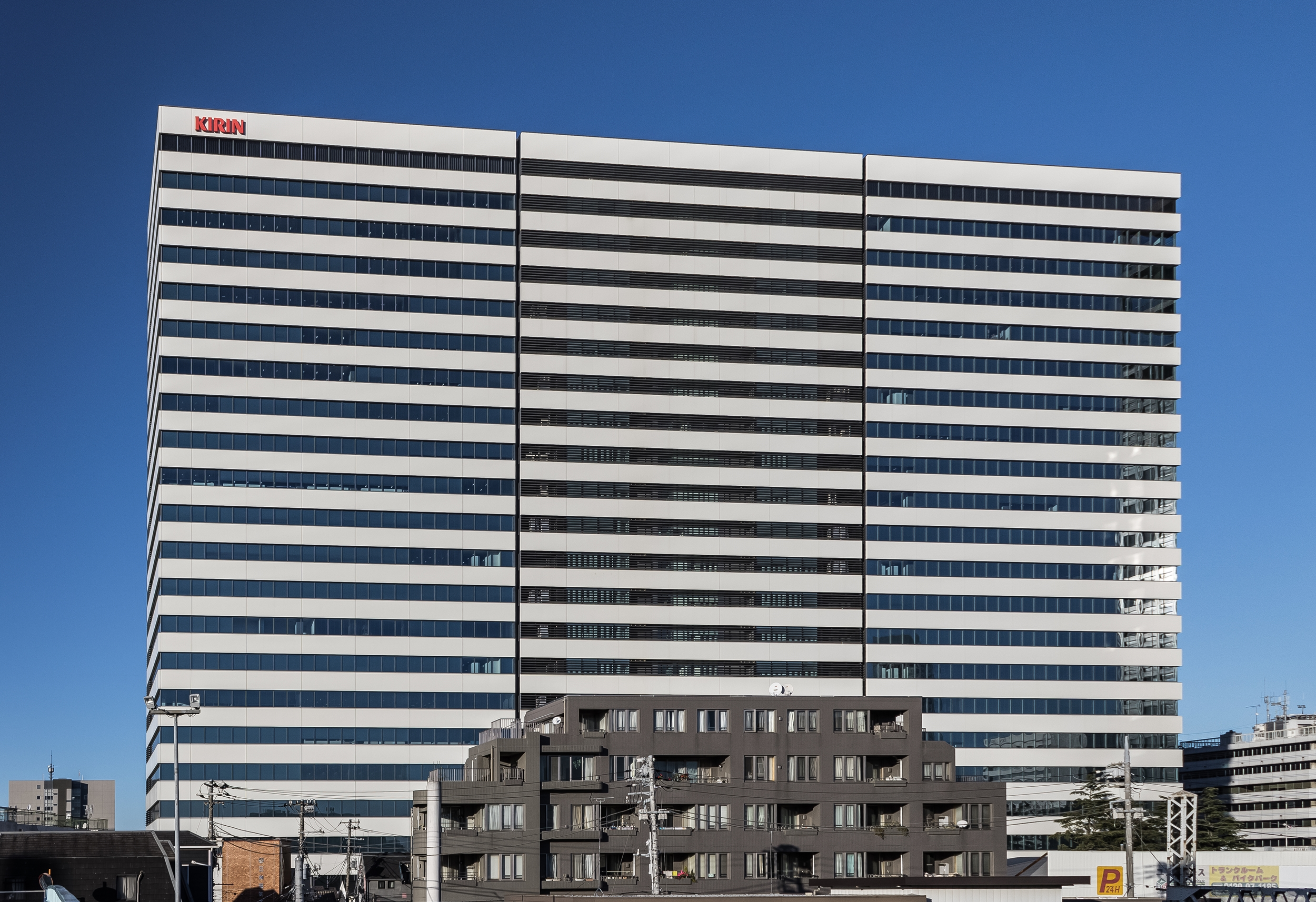
Headquarters of Kirin, Nakano Central Park South

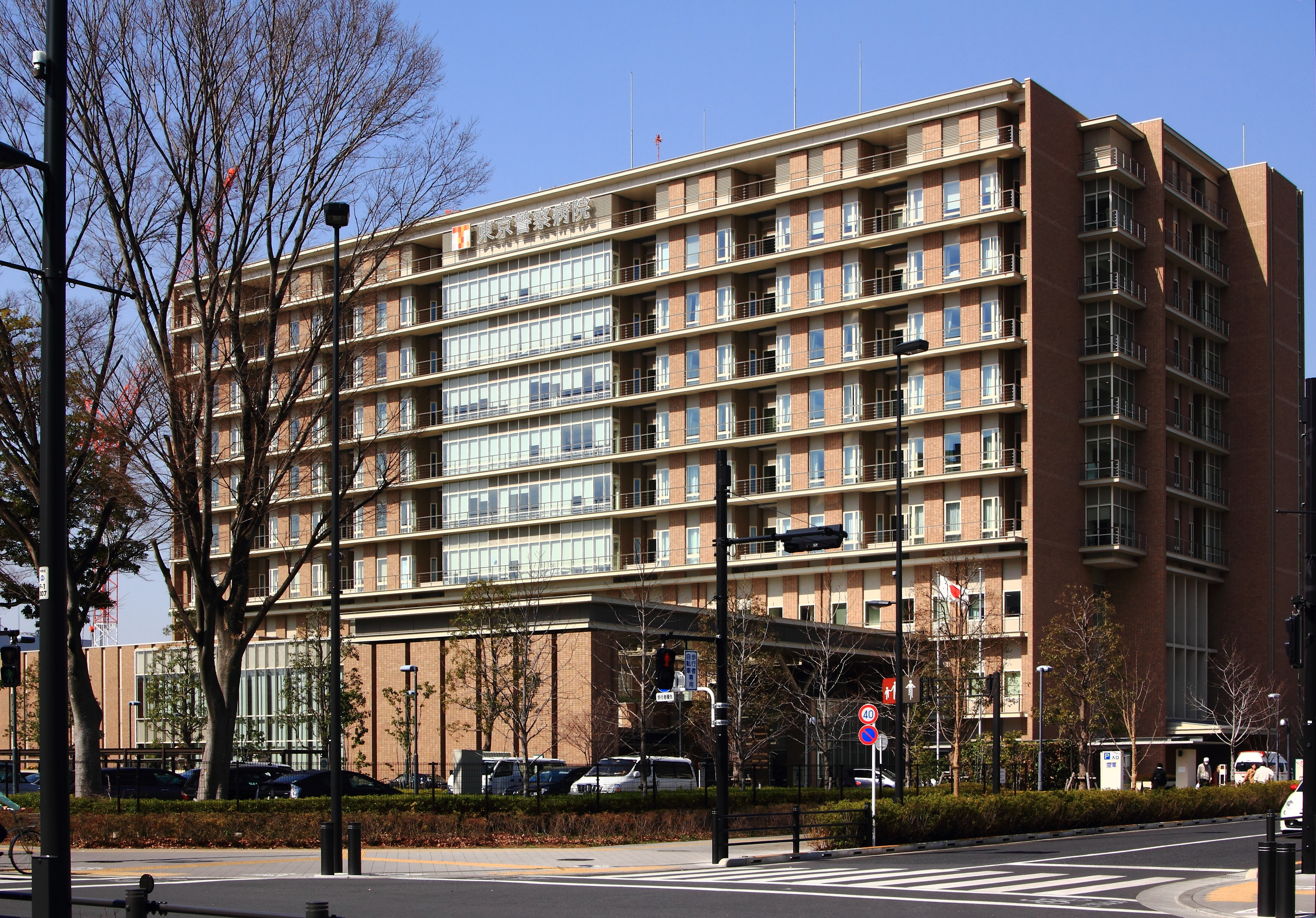
Tokyo Metropolitan Police Hospital

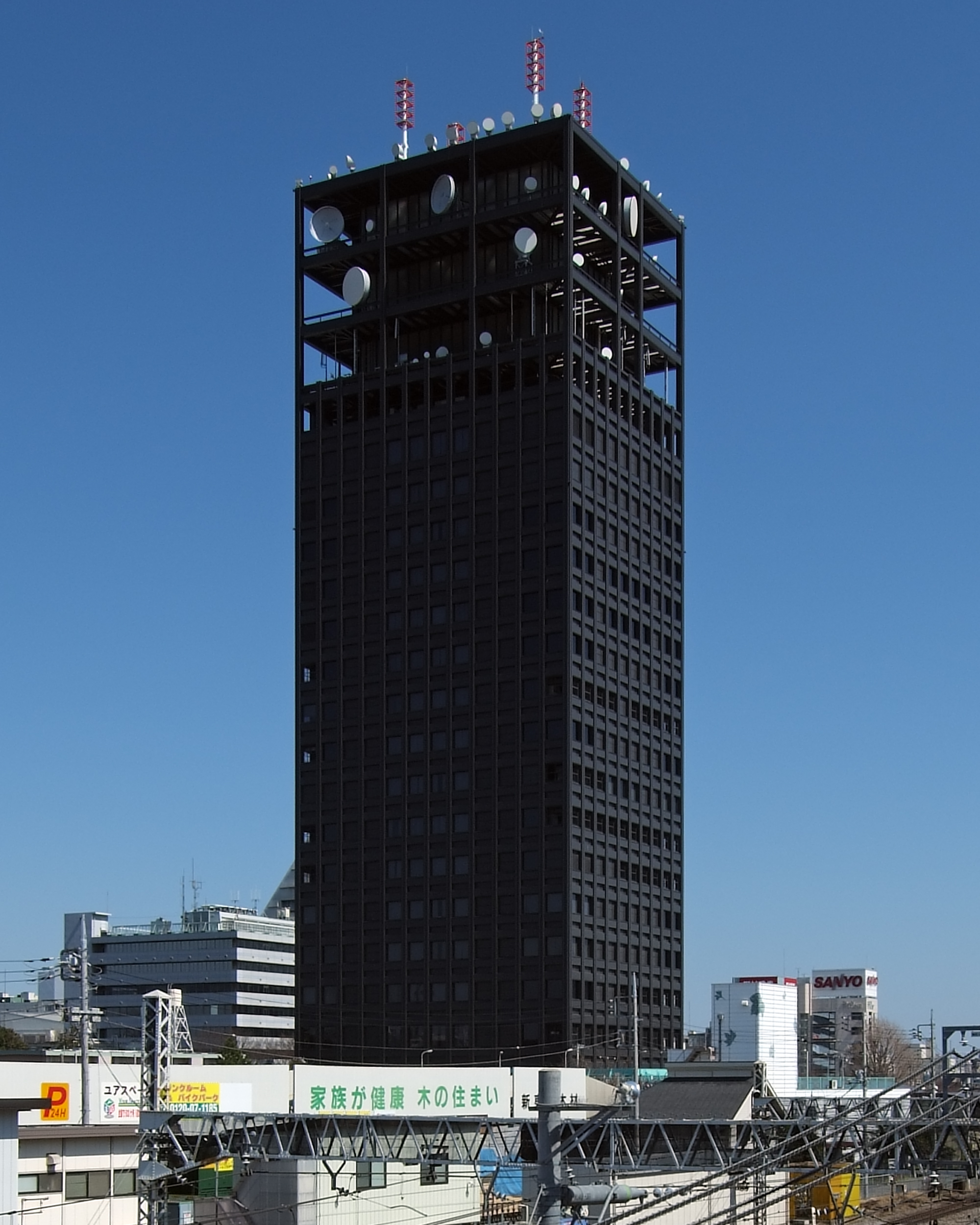
NTT Docomo Nakano Building

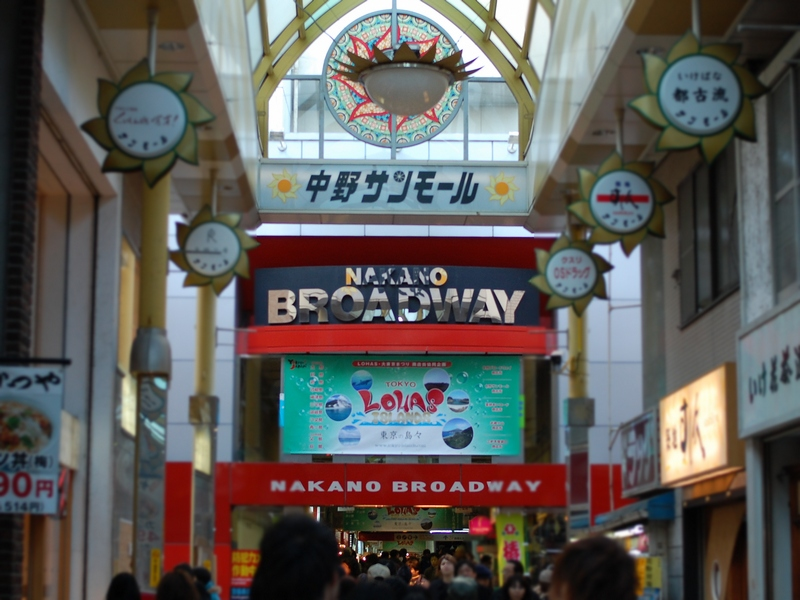
Nakano Broadway

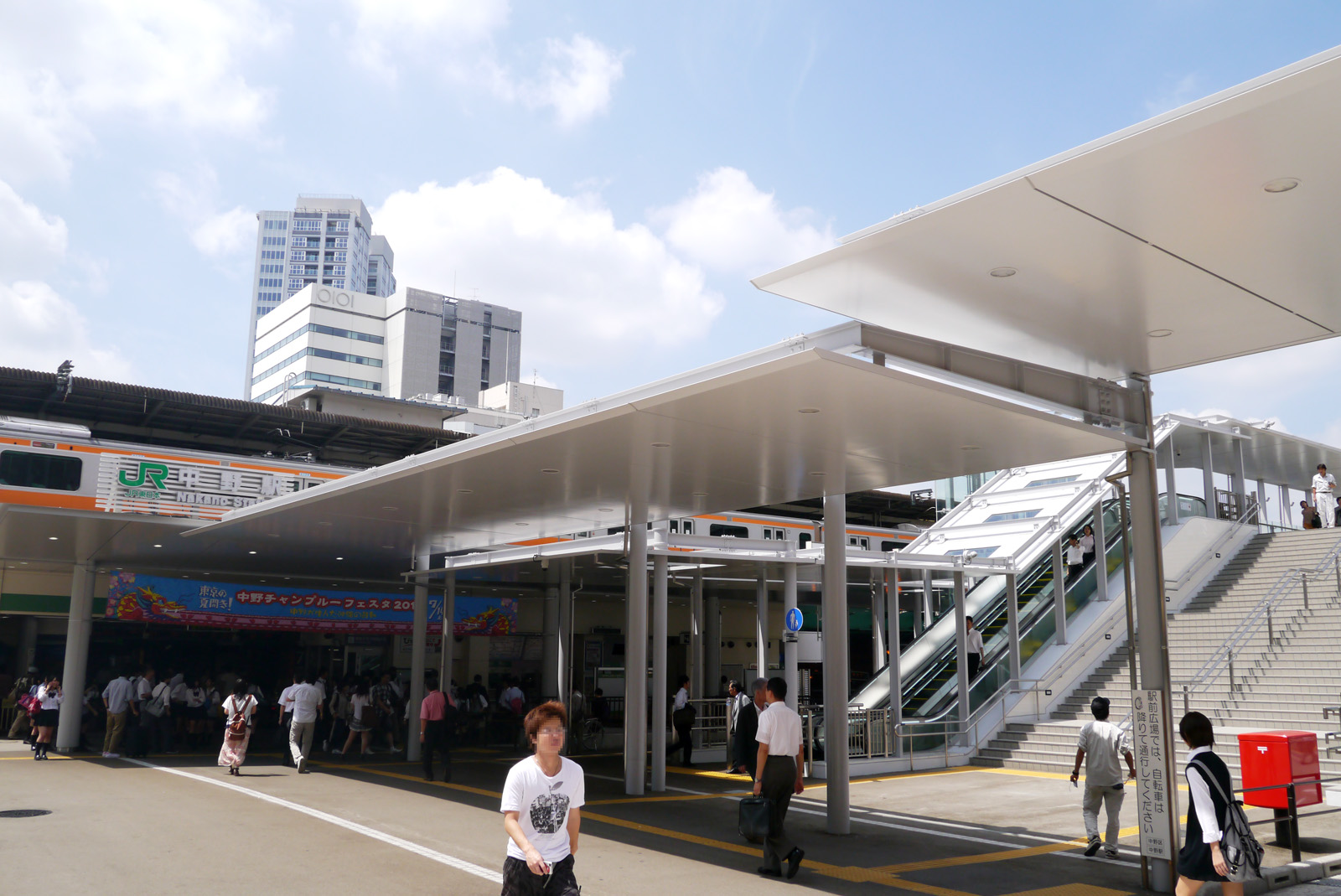
Nakano Station (North Exit)

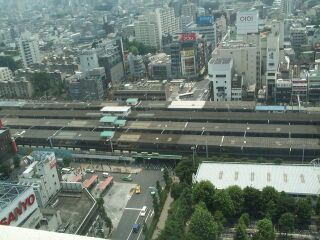
Nakano Station and Nakano Dori

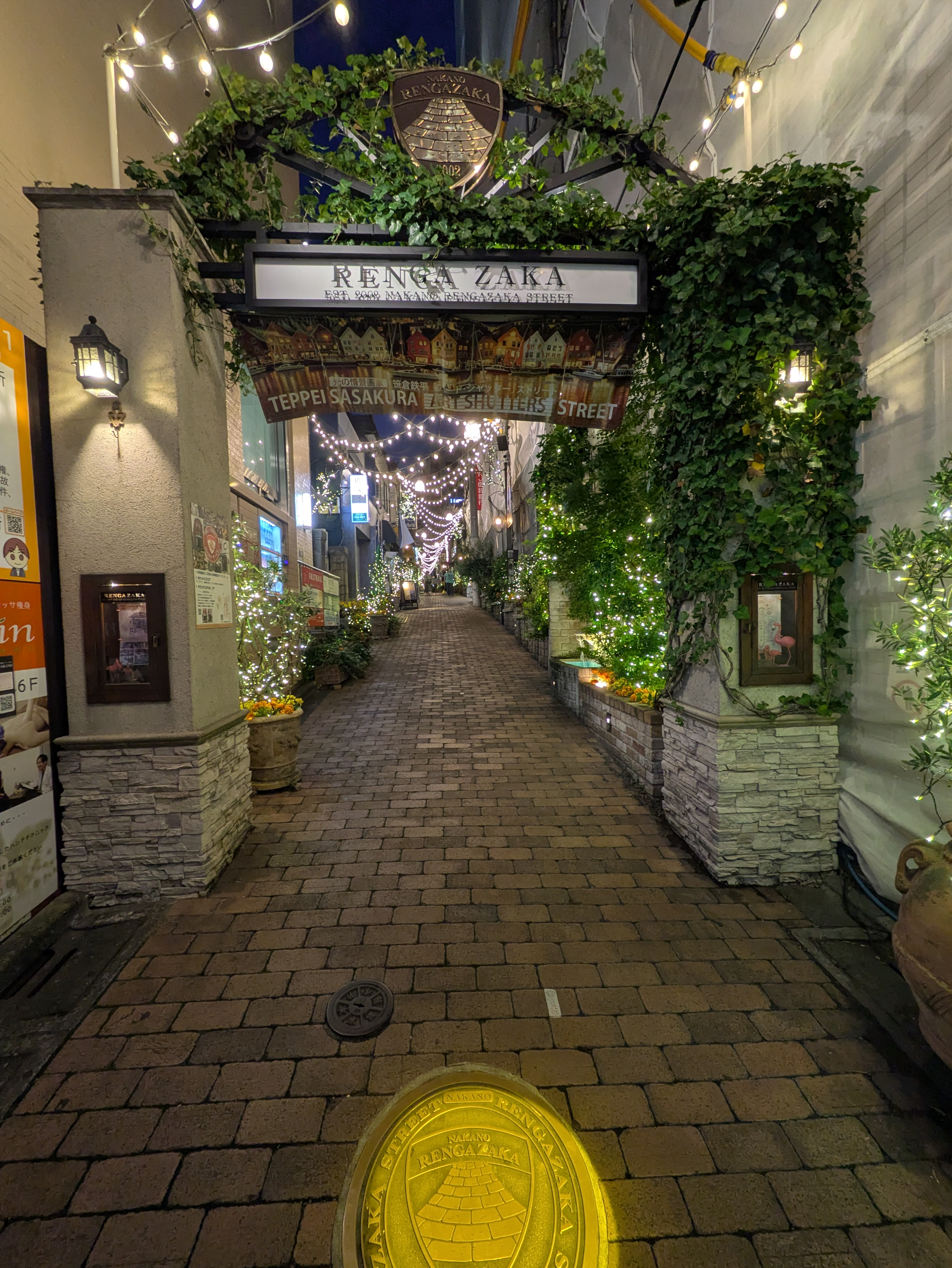
Renga zaka（2025年9月）
