= Beyblade (franchise) =

Japanese media franchise

- Logo of Beyblade X, the fourth and current iteration of the franchise
- Created by: Takara
- Original work: Beyblade (1999)
- Years: 1999–present

Print publications
- Comics: Beyblade; Metal Fight Beyblade; Metal Fight Beyblade Zero-G; Beyblade Burst; Beyblade X

Films and television
- Films: Beyblade: Fierce Battle; Metal Fight Beyblade vs the Sun: Sol Blaze, the Scorching Hot Invader
- Animated series: Beyblade; Beyblade: Metal Fusion; Beyblade Burst; Beyblade X

Beyblade is a Japanese media franchise that consists of toys, manga, anime television series and films, centered around the Beyblade toyline of battling spinning tops. Originally developed by Takara, it was first released in Japan in July 1999 along with a related manga series. Following Takara's merger with Tomy in 2006, Beyblades are now developed by Takara Tomy.

Beyblade has undergone four separate iterations, each with their own media continuity. The first series, known simply as Beyblade, ran from 1999 to 2004. The accompanying manga series was adapted into an anime series produced by Madhouse, which ran for three seasons. A film, Beyblade: Fierce Battle, was released in 2002. The second series, Beyblade: Metal Fusion (known as Metal Fight Beyblade in Japan), was introduced in 2008. Unlike the mostly plastic Beyblades in the original iteration, Beyblades released under the Metal Fusion series features components made of metal. Like before, an accompanying manga series was adapted into an anime, produced by Tatsunoko Production and SynergySP. Retroactively named Beyblade: Metal Saga, the anime comprises four seasons. An action-adventure film, Metal Fight Beyblade vs the Sun: Sol Blaze, the Scorching Hot Invader, premiered in 2010. The third iteration of Beyblade, Beyblade Burst, ran from 2015 to 2021. The fourth and current iteration, Beyblade X, began in 2023. A spinoff, BeyWheelz, was released in 2012.

== Toys ==
Beyblade is a line of spinning-top toys originally developed by Takara, first released in Japan in July 1999, along with a related manga series. Following Takara's merger with Tomy in 2006, Beyblades are now developed by Takara Tomy. Various toy companies around the world have licensed Beyblade toys for their own regions, such as Hasbro in most Western countries, Sonokong in South Korea, and Takara Tomy for most Eastern countries.

Both the toys and their names were inspired by the Beigoma, a traditional Japanese spinning top. The concept is similar to Battling Tops, another spinning top game developed in 1968. In 2002, Hasbro sold Beyblade toys internationally (under license from Takara). On July 12, 2008, Takara Tomy released Metal Fight: Beyblade, the second iteration of the toy. The third iteration, titled Beyblade Burst, was released by Takara Tomy on July 18, 2015. The fourth iteration of the toy line, Beyblade X, was released on July 15, 2023.

== Video games ==
- Beyblade (2001)
- Beyblade: Super Tournament Battle (2003)
- Beyblade X: Xone (2024)

== Manga ==
1. Beyblade – ran from September 1999 to July 2004.
2. Bakuten Shoot Beyblade: Rising – ran from July 15, 2016, to June 25, 2021.
3. Metal Fight Beyblade – ran from September 13, 2008, to February 15, 2012.
4. Metal Fight Beyblade Zero-G – ran from April 2012 to December 2012.
5. Beyblade Burst – ran from August 2015 to December 15, 2021.
6. Beyblade X – running since May 15, 2023.

== Anime ==
=== Television series and original net animation ===
Three anime seasons based on the first manga, three anime seasons based on the second manga, one anime season based on the third manga, six anime seasons based on the fourth manga and three anime season based on the fifth manga has been aired since 2001.

Series overview
| No. | Title | Episodes | Run |
Beyblade
| 1 | Beyblade | 51 | January 8, 2001 – December 24, 2001 |
| 2 | Beyblade V-Force | 51 | January 7, 2002 – December 30, 2002 |
| 3 | Beyblade G-Revolution | 52 | January 6, 2003 – December 29, 2003 |
Beyblade: Metal Saga
| 1 | Beyblade: Metal Fusion | 51 | April 5, 2009 – March 28, 2010 |
| 2 | Beyblade: Metal Masters | 51 | April 4, 2010 – March 27, 2011 |
| 3 | Beyblade: Metal Fury | 52 (Japanese version); 39 (English version) | April 3, 2011 – April 1, 2012 |
| 4 | Beyblade: Shogun Steel | 45 (Japanese version); 26 (English version) | April 8, 2012 – December 23, 2012 |
Spin-off series
| 1 | BeyWheelz | 13 | August 11, 2012 – October 6, 2012 |
| 2 | BeyWarriors: BeyRaiderz | 13 | January 4, 2014 – March 29, 2014 |
| 3 | BeyWarriors: Cyborg | 26 + 2 specials | October 18, 2014 – February 27, 2015 |
Beyblade Burst
| 1 | Beyblade Burst | 51 | April 4, 2016 – March 27, 2017 |
| 2 | Beyblade Burst Evolution | 51 | April 3, 2017 – March 26, 2018 |
| 3 | Beyblade Burst Turbo | 51 | April 2, 2018 – March 25, 2019 |
| 4 | Beyblade Burst Rise | 52 (Japanese version); 26 (English version) | April 5, 2019 – March 27, 2020 |
| 5 | Beyblade Burst Surge | 52 (Japanese version); 26 (English version) | April 3, 2020 – March 19, 2021 |
| 6 | Beyblade Burst QuadDrive | 52 (Japanese version); 26 (English version) | April 2, 2021 – March 18, 2022 |
| 7 | Beyblade Burst QuadStrike | 26 | April 3, 2023 – December 2, 2023 |
Beyblade X
| 1 | Beyblade X | 51 | October 6, 2023 – October 4, 2024 |
| 2 | Beyblade X | 49 | October 18, 2024 – October 3, 2025 |
| 3 | Beyblade X | 34 | October 24, 2025 – September 18, 2026 |
| Total | | 876 | January 8, 2001 – present |

=== Films ===
Two anime films have been aired: Beyblade: Fierce Battle and Metal Fight Beyblade vs the Sun: Sol Blaze, the Scorching Hot Invader.
