= Aki Kanada =

Japanese voice actress (born 1983)

- 金田 アキ
- Born: 18 August 1983 (age 43)
- Other name: Akkie (アッキー)
- Occupation: Voice actress
- Years active: 2005–present
- Notable work: Ginga Hagane in Beyblade: Metal Fusion; Lightnin in Bakugan: Battle Planet; Nyatoran in Healin' Good Pretty Cure

Aki Kanada (金田 アキ, Kanada Aki; born 18 August 1983) is a Japanese voice actress affiliated with Zynchro. She is known for voicing Ginga Hagane in Beyblade: Metal Fusion, Sasuke Akatsuki in Battle Spirits: Burning Soul, Makoto in Marvel Future Avengers, Lightnin in Bakugan: Battle Planet, and Nyatoran in Healin' Good Pretty Cure.

== Biography ==
Aki Kanada, a native of Shimoyama, Aichi (now part of Toyota, Aichi), was born on 18 August 1983. She decided to become a voice actress after hearing that her favorite manga series, Kodocha, would get an anime adaptation.

She voiced a younger Italy Veneziano in Hetalia: Axis Powers. She voiced Ginga Hagane in Beyblade: Metal Fusion and reprised her role in Metal Fight Beyblade vs the Sun: Sol Blaze, the Scorching Hot Invader (2010). In 2013, she voiced Connie in Line Offline Salaryman, a series of anime shorts focusing on the mascots of the Line app, and she starred as Apprentice in the anime short series Koroshiya-san: The Hired Gun.

In September 2015, it was announced that she would voice Yutaka Sasaki in Phantasy Star Online 2 anime adaptation. In 2017, she voiced Makoto in Marvel Future Avengers. In October that same year, she was cast as Rare Mita in Tokimeki Idol, a spin-off mobile game in the Tokimeki Memorial franchise.

In 2018, she voiced Mirai in Saint Seiya: Saintia Shō. In 2019, she voiced Ichika in Phantasy Star Online 2 Comic and Lightning in Bakugan: Battle Planet. In 2020, she voiced Nyatoran in Healin' Good Pretty Cure, the seventeenth installment of the Pretty Cure franchise. In 2021, she voiced Gokū Impulse Gundam in SD Gundam World Heroes.

== Filmography ==
=== Anime television ===
2005

- Idaten Jump, Gabu Samejima (Note: Credited as Akiyo Kanada (金田 晶代, Kanada Akiyo))

2008

- Natsume's Book of Friends, Takashi's aunt, housewife, schoolgirl, Tamiko's mother

2009

- Beyblade: Metal Fusion, Ginga Hagane
- Hetalia: Axis Powers, young Italy Veneziano

2012

- The Prince of Tennis II, Ken

2013

- Apprentice, Koroshiya-san: The Hired Gun

2014

- BeyWarriors: BeyRaiderz, Armes Navy

2015

- Battle Spirits: Burning Soul, Sasuke Akatsuki

2016

- Phantasy Star Online 2, Yutaka Sasaki

2017

- Marvel Future Avengers, Makoto

2018

- Persona 5: The Animation, Shinya Oda

2019

- Bakugan: Battle Planet, Lightning

2020

- Healin' Good Pretty Cure, Nyatoran

2021

- Scarlet Nexus, young Karen Travers

2024

- Dragon Ball Daima, Mini Krillin

2025

- Shangri-La Frontier 2nd Season, Stude

=== Films ===
2010

- Metal Fight Beyblade vs the Sun: Sol Blaze, the Scorching Hot Invader, Ginga Hagane

=== Video games ===
2011

- Yu-Gi-Oh! 5D's Tag Force 6, Carly Nagisa

2013

- Yu-Gi-Oh! Zexal World Duel Carnival, Tokunosuke Omoteura

2016

- Etrian Odyssey V, Syrik
- Persona 5, Shinya Oda
- Yu-Gi-Oh! Duel Links, Carly Nagisa

2018

- Tokimeki Idol, Rare Mita

2019

- Persona 5 Royal, Shinya Oda

=== Original net animation ===
2013

- Line Offline: Salaryman, Connie

2014

- Fastening Days, schoolboy, sales clerk A

2018

- Saint Seiya: Saintia Shō, Mirai

2019

- Phantasy Star Online 2 Comic, Ichika

2021

- SD Gundam World Heroes, Gokū Impulse Gundam
