= Beyblade (2001 video game) =

- Developer: Wavedge Co
- Publisher: Crave Entertainment
- Platform: PlayStation
- Release: 2001; September 2003 (EU)
- Genre: Action

Beyblade is a 2001 video game based on the Beyblade toy line and animated series.

== Gameplay ==
In the game, the player enters either a Tournament or a single Free Battle, launches a Beyblade by timing the pull of a ripcord meter, and then controls the spinning top inside the arena by steering with the analog stick, absorbing impact with a button press when collisions occur, and activating special Bit Beast attacks using the face buttons. A match is won by breaking the opponent's top, causing it to stop spinning, or knocking it out of the arena, and between battles the player can upgrade their Beyblade with different parts, launchers, and additional tops earned through play.

== Reception ==
Reception

Review scores
Publication	Score
IGN	1.5/10
Jeuxvideo	7/20
Official U.S. PlayStation Magazine	1.5/5

The Northern Echo called Beyblade a fun take on the beat' em up genre.

In September 2003, Atari reported Beyblade ranked number 1 in the largest european markets, according to GfK France, Chart Track, Media Control, Nielsen, Gamemania.
