= Beyblade Burst QuadDrive =

- Season 6
- Key Visual
- No. of episodes: 52 (Japanese version); 26 (English version)

Release
- Original network: YouTube (CoroCoroo, Takara Tomy)
- Original release: April 2, 2021 – March 18, 2022

Season chronology
- ← Previous; Burst Surge Next → Burst QuadStrike

Beyblade Burst QuadDrive, known in Japan as Beyblade Burst Dynamite Battle (ベイブレードバーストDB(ダイナマイトバトル), Beiburēdo Bāsuto Dainamaito Batoru) and as Beyblade Burst DB, is a 2021 original net animation series and the sixth season of Beyblade Burst. The series was produced by ADK Emotions and animated by OLM, and it began streaming in Japan on the CoroCoro and Takara Tomy YouTube channels on April 2, 2021. An English dub of the season premiered on Disney XD and DisneyNOW in the United States on December 4, 2021. The Japanese opening theme is "Clash! Dynamite Battle" by Noristry while the ending theme is an instrumental version of "Clash! Dynamite Battle". The English opening theme is "We're Your Rebels" by NateWantsToBattle while the ending theme is an instrumental version of "We're Your Rebels".

== Episode list ==
No. overall	No. in season	Japanese translated title / English dub title	Directed by	Written by	Original release date	English air date
258	1	"Demon King! Dynamite Belial!!" / The Dark Prince! And Destruction Belfyre! (Part 1); Transliteration: "Maō! Dainamaito Beriaru!!" (Japanese: 魔王！ ダイナマイトベリアル！！)	Dai Fukuyama; Takayuki Yamamoto	Toshimichi Ōkawa	April 2, 2021	December 4, 2021 (United States)
Months after the Ultimate Tag Series, Bashara Suiro and his sister Hanna venture into a haunted house. They watch as others exit the home screaming, but that doesn't stop Hanna's curiosity. Once inside, they experience many scary events, which eventually leads them to a room with a bey stadium. A small boy dressed in bat apparel named Bel Daizora appears. He calls himself "The King of Hell" and asks that people address him as the Dark Prince. His Beyblade is Destruction Belfyre Nexus Venture-2. It is smaller than a usual bey. Bashara, being a blader, accepts the challenge to battle. His Bey is Demise Spellscraper Metal Fusion 2B. At BC Sol, Valt Aoi is battling with other members when they notice something taking place on Beytube. Elsewhere, Lui Shirosagi is watching as well. After launching, Belfyre takes numerous hits, but because of its low center of gravity, it doesn't slow down. When Spellscraper begins to lose stamina, Bel attacks with Destruction Wrecker to burst his opponent. Free De La Hoya wonders if this is a new generation of Beys while Lui is intrigued in the new blader. Note: In the english dub, this is the first Beyblade episode to air following the death of Hasbro Chief Executive Officer, Brian Goldner.
259	2	"Belial vs. Longinus" / The Dark Prince! And Destruction Belfyre! (Part 2); Transliteration: "Beriaru Bāsasu Ronginusu" (Japanese: 魔王(ベリアル)VS絶対王者(ロンギヌス))	Dai Fukuyama; Takayuki Yamamoto	Toshimichi Ōkawa	April 2, 2021	December 4, 2021 (United States)
Reeling from his loss to Bel, Bashara is determined to get stronger and battle the Dark Prince one more time. But Ranzo Kiyama, an energetic Blader from Brazil, arrives on the scene with a similar goal in mind. Despite their differences, Bashara and Ranzo team up and make their way to Phantom's Gate to challenge the Dark Prince.
260	3	"Graveyard of Beys! The Gates of Hell!!" / Graveyard of Beys! Phantom's Gate! (Part 1); Transliteration: "Bei no Hakaba! Makai no Mon!!" (Japanese: ベイの墓場！ 魔界の門！！)	Mizuki Sasaki	Hideki Sonoda	April 9, 2021	December 5, 2021 (United States)
After Ranzo takes a surprise point from Bel, it's time for the Dark Prince to get serious. Determined to prove he can win, Bel challenges Ranzo not just to a battle, but to anything — eating, dishwashing, whatever they're in the middle of! Ranzo swore he won't go home until he defeates Bel, and at this rate, he might even leave.
261	4	"Sturm und Drang! Cyclone Ragnaruk!!" / Graveyard of Beys! Phantom's Gate! (Part 2); Transliteration: "Shippū Dotō! Saikuron Ragunaruku!!" (Japanese: 疾風怒涛！ サイクロンラグナルク！！)	Ryō Miyata	Hideki Sonoda	April 16, 2021	December 5, 2021 (United States)
262	5	"Mode Change! High & Low!!" / Changing Modes! Highs and Lows! (Part 1); Transliteration: "Mōdo Chenji! Hai Ando Rō!!" (Japanese: モードチェンジ！ ハイ&ロー！！)	Yūsuke Onoda	Toshimichi Ōkawa	April 23, 2021	December 11, 2021 (United States)
263	6	"Rival and Amigo!!" / Changing Modes! Highs and Lows! (Part 2); Transliteration: "Raibaru to Amīgo!!" (Japanese: ライバルとアミーゴ！！)	Yūma Suzuki	Toshimichi Ōkawa	April 30, 2021	December 11, 2021 (United States)
264	7	"Demon World Theatre! Bell vs. Valt!!" / Theater of the Abyss! Bel vs. Valt! (Part 1); Transliteration: "Makai Gekijō! Beru Bāsasu Baruto!!" (Japanese: 魔界劇場！ ベルVSバルト！！)	Dai Fukuyama	Hideki Sonoda	May 7, 2021	December 18, 2021 (United States)
265	8	"Counterattack! Dynamite Bomber!! / Counterattack! Destruction Wrecker!" / Theater of the Abyss! Bel vs. Valt! (Part 2); Transliteration: "Gyakushū! Dainamaito Bonbā!!" (Japanese: 逆襲！ ダイナマイトボンバー！！)	Takayuki Yamamoto	Hideki Sonoda	May 14, 2021	December 18, 2021 (United States)
266	9	"The Demon King Flies Onto the World Stage!!" / To the Skies! World Domination! (Part 1); Transliteration: "Maō Sekai ni Tobu!!" (Japanese: 魔王ッ世界に翔ぶ！！)	Yoshiyuki Kumeda	Hideki Sonoda	May 21, 2021	February 5, 2022 (United States)
267	10	"The Solitary Vanish Fafnir!!" / To the Skies! World Domination! (Part 2); Transliteration: "Kokō no Banisshu Fabuniru!!" (Japanese: 孤高のバニッシュファブニル！！)	Shin'ichi Fukumoto	Toshimichi Ōkawa	May 28, 2021	February 5, 2022 (United States)
268	11	"The Other Valkyrie!!" / The Other Valtryek! (Part 1); Transliteration: "Mō Hitotsu no Varukirī!!" (Japanese: もうひとつのヴァルキリー！！)	Ryō Miyata	Toshimichi Ōkawa	June 4, 2021	February 12, 2022 (United States)
269	12	"Belial's Upgrade!!" / The Other Valtryek! (Part 2); Transliteration: "Bājon Appu Beriaru!!" (Japanese: 改造強化(バージョンアップ)ベリアル！！)	Shigeru Yamazaki	Hideki Sonoda	June 11, 2021	February 12, 2022 (United States)
270	13	"Reversal Strategy! Belial vs. Fafnir!!" / Flipping the Script! Belfyre vs. Fafnir! (Part 1); Transliteration: "Gyakuten Sakusen! Beriaru Bāsasu Fabuniru!!" (Japanese: 逆転作戦！ ベリアルVSファブニル！！)	Mizuki Sasaki	Hideki Sonoda	June 18, 2021	February 19, 2022 (United States)
271	14	"Explosive Sword! Savior Valkyrie!!" / Flipping the Script! Belfyre vs. Fafnir! (Part 2); Transliteration: "Baku Ken! Seibā Varukirī!!" (Japanese: 爆剣！ セイバーヴァルキリー！！)	Yūsuke Onoda	Toshimichi Ōkawa	June 25, 2021	February 19, 2022 (United States)
272	15	"Roar of the Evil Dragon, Roar Bahamut!" / Dragon's Howl! Roar Balkesh! (Part 1); Transliteration: "Jaryū no Hōkō, Roa Bahamūto!" (Japanese: 邪竜の咆哮、ロアバハムート！)	Dai Fukuyama	Toshimichi Ōkawa	July 2, 2021	February 26, 2022 (United States)
273	16	"Crashing Awakening! Valkyrie vs. Valkyrie!!" / Dragon's Howl! Roar Balkesh! (Part 2); Transliteration: "Gekitotsu Kakusei! Varukirī Bāsasu Varukirī!!" (Japanese: 激突覚醒！ ヴァルキリーVSヴァルキリー！！)	Keisuke Warita	Hideki Sonoda	July 9, 2021	February 26, 2022 (United States)
274	17	"Flying Dynamite Battle Tour!" / Lift Off! The Great Aerial Tour! (Part 1); Transliteration: "Soratobu Dainamaito Batoru Tsuā!" (Japanese: 空飛ぶ爆裂(ダイナマイト)バトルツアー！)	Takayuki Yamamoto	Hideki Sonoda	July 16, 2021	March 5, 2022 (United States)
275	18	"Earthquake at the Sacred Grounds! Battle of Beigoma Academy!!" / Lift Off! The Great Aerial Tour! (Part 2); Transliteration: "Seichi Gekishin! Beigoma Gakuen no Tatakai!!" (Japanese: 聖地激震！ 米駒学園の闘い！！)	Yoshiyuki Kumeda; Jingu O	Toshimichi Ōkawa	July 23, 2021	March 5, 2022 (United States)
276	19	"Nova Clash! Bell vs. Rashad!!" / Novas Collide! Bel vs. Rashad! (Part 1); Transliteration: "Shinsei Gekitotsu! Beru Bāsasu Rashado!!" (Japanese: 新星激突！ ベルVSラシャド！！)	Ryō Miyata	Toshimichi Ōkawa	July 30, 2021	March 12, 2022 (United States)
277	20	"The Crimson Astral Spriggan!!" / Novas Collide! Bel vs. Rashad! (Part 2); Transliteration: "Kurenai no Asutoraru Supurigan!!" (Japanese: 紅の超星(アストラルスプリガン)！！)	Yūsuke Onoda	Hideki Sonoda	August 6, 2021	March 12, 2022 (United States)
278	21	"The Demon King Attacks! Bell vs. Free!" / The Dark Prince Strikes! Bel vs. Free! (Part 1); Transliteration: "Maō Shūgeki! Beru Bāsasu Furī!!" (Japanese: 魔王襲撃！ ベルVSフリー！！)	Mizuki Sasaki	Hideki Sonoda	August 13, 2021	March 19, 2022 (United States)
279	22	"Onigashima, Battle Royal!!" / The Dark Prince Strikes! Bel vs. Free! (Part 2); Transliteration: "Onigashima, Batoru Roiyaru!!" (Japanese: 鬼ヶ島、バトルロイヤル！！)	Shigeru Yamazaki	Toshimichi Ōkawa	August 20, 2021	March 19, 2022 (United States)
280	23	"The Demon King, Becomes a Servant!!" / Dark Prince One Day! Minion the Next! (Part 1); Transliteration: "Maō, Meshitsukai ni Naru!!" (Japanese: 魔王、召使いになる！！)	Takayuki Yamamoto	Toshimichi Ōkawa	August 27, 2021	March 26, 2022 (United States)
281	24	"Crimson Dance! Magma Ifrit!!" / Dark Prince One Day! Minion the Next! (Part 2); Transliteration: "Shinku no Mai! Maguma Ifurīto!!" (Japanese: 真紅の舞！マグマイフリート！！)	Keisuke Warita	Hideki Sonoda	September 3, 2021	March 26, 2022 (United States)
282	25	"Tyranny of the Eight-headed Dragon! Guilty Longinus!!" / Knight of Dragons! Guilty Luinor! (Part 1); Transliteration: "Yaryū no Bōkun! Giruti Ronginusu!!" (Japanese: 八(や)竜(りゅう)の暴君！ギルティロンギヌス！！)	Dai Fukuyama	Hideki Sonoda	September 10, 2021	April 2, 2022 (United States)
283	26	"The Battle at Onigashima's Summit!!" / Knight of Dragons! Guilty Luinor! (Part 2); Transliteration: "Onigashima Chōjō Batoru!!" (Japanese: 鬼ヶ島頂上決闘(バトル)！！)	Takeshi Shiga	Toshimichi Ōkawa	September 17, 2021	April 2, 2022 (United States)
284	27	"The Floating Demon King's Great Advance!" / MVP! Great Aerial Tour's Landing! (Part 1); Transliteration: "Ukare Maō no Dai Shingeki!" (Japanese: 浮かれ魔王の大進撃！)	Shigeki Awai	Toshimichi Ōkawa	September 24, 2021	April 9, 2022 (United States)
285	28	"The Decisive Aerial Battle! Dynamite battle!!" / MVP! Great Aerial Tour's Landing! (Part 2); Transliteration: "Kūchū Kessen! Dainamaito Batoru!!" (Japanese: 空中決戦！ダイナマイトバトル！！)	Yoshiyuki Kumeda	Hideki Sonoda	October 1, 2021	April 9, 2022 (United States)
286	29	"The Demon King's Resurrection! Dangerous Belial!!" / The Dark Prince Returns! Devastate Belfyre! (Part 1); Transliteration: "Maō Fukkatsu! Denjarasu Beriaru!!" (Japanese: 魔王復活！デンジャラスベリアル！！)	Ryō Miyata	Hideki Sonoda	October 8, 2021	May 22, 2022 (Australia); June 11, 2022 (United States)
287	30	"Advent of the High King of Light!!" / The Dark Prince Returns! Devastate Belfyre! (Part 2); Transliteration: "Hikari no Haō Kōrin!!" (Japanese: 光の覇王降臨！！)	Shigeki Awai; Jingu O	Toshimichi Ōkawa	October 15, 2021	May 22, 2022 (Australia); June 11, 2022 (United States)
288	31	"Halo! Greatest Raphael!!" / Ring of Light! Glory Regnar! (Part 1); Transliteration: "Kōrin! Gureitesuto Rafaeru!!" (Japanese: 光輪！グレイテストラファエル！！)	Yūsuke Onoda	Toshimichi Ōkawa	October 22, 2021	May 28, 2022 (Australia); June 18, 2022 (United States)
289	32	"Demon King vs. High King! The Strongest Team Playoff!!" / Ring of Light! Glory Regnar! (Part 2); Transliteration: "Maō Bāsasu Haō! Saikyō Chīmu Ketteisen!!" (Japanese: 魔王VS覇王！最強チーム決定戦！！)	Takayuki Yamamoto	Hideki Sonoda	October 29, 2021	May 28, 2022 (Australia); June 18, 2022 (United States)
290	33	"Reversal! Reversal!! Great Counterattack!!!" / Reversal! Reversal! Great Counterattack! (Part 1); Transliteration: "Gyakuten! Gyakuten! Dai Gyakushū!!!" (Japanese: 逆転！逆転！！大逆襲！！！)	Dai Fukuyama	Hideki Sonoda	November 5, 2021	May 29, 2022 (Australia); June 25, 2022 (United States)
291	34	"3rd Round! Battle Royal!!" / Reversal! Reversal! Great Counterattack! (Part 2); Transliteration: "Sādo Raundo! Batoru Roiyaru!!" (Japanese: 3rd ROUND(ラウンド)！総力戦(バトルロイヤル)！！)	Shigeru Yamazaki	Toshimichi Ōkawa	November 12, 2021	May 29, 2022 (Australia); June 25, 2022 (United States)
292	35	"The Demon King, Leaves the Team?!" / Disbanded! The Dark Prince Goes Rogue?! (Part 1); Transliteration: "Maō, Chīmu Dattai!?" (Japanese: 魔王、チーム脱退！？)	Mizuki Sasaki	Toshimichi Ōkawa	November 19, 2021	June 4, 2022 (Australia); July 2, 2022 (United States)
293	36	"Heated! Mutiny Battle!!" / Disbanded! The Dark Prince Goes Rogue?! (Part 2); Transliteration: "Moeru ze! Gekokujō Batoru!!" (Japanese: 燃えるぜッ！下剋上バトル！！)	Yoshiyuki Kumeda	Hideki Sonoda	November 26, 2021	June 4, 2022 (Australia); July 2, 2022 (United States)
294	37	"Rage! Greatest Pendulum!!" / Regnar's Wrath! Glory Pendulum! (Part 1); Transliteration: "Gekido! Gureitesuto Pendyuramu!!" (Japanese: 激怒！振り子地獄(グレイテストペンデュラム)！！)	Ryō Miyata	Hideki Sonoda	December 3, 2021	July 9, 2022 (United States); August 13, 2022 (Australia)
295	38	"The Ultimate Bond! Ultimate Valkyrie!!" / Regnar's Wrath! Glory Pendulum! (Part 2); Transliteration: "Kyūkyoku no Kizuna! Arutimetto Varukirī!!" (Japanese: 究極の絆！アルティメットヴァルキリー！！)	Shigeki Awai	Toshimichi Ōkawa	December 10, 2021	July 9, 2022 (United States); August 13, 2022 (Australia)
296	39	"Reckless Panic! Full Custom Bey Launcher!!" / Reckless Panic! Bag of Tricks! (Part 1); Transliteration: "Bōsō Panikku! Furu Kasutamu Bei Ranchā!!" (Japanese: 暴走パニック！フルカスタムベイランチャー！！)	Haru Shinomiya	Toshimichi Ōkawa	December 17, 2021	July 16, 2022 (United States); August 14, 2022 (Australia)
297	40	"High & Low! Hybrid Stadium!!" / Reckless Panic! Bag of Tricks! (Part 2); Transliteration: "Hai Ando Rō! Haiburiddo Sutajiamu!!" (Japanese: ハイ&ロー！ハイブリッドスタジアム！！)	Takayuki Yamamoto	Hideki Sonoda	December 24, 2021	July 16, 2022 (United States); August 14, 2022 (Australia)
298	41	"Phoenix! Prominence Phoenix!!" / Rekindled Flames! Prominence Phoenix! (Part 1); Transliteration: "Fushichō! Purominensu Fenikkusu!!" (Japanese: 不死鳥！プロミネンスフェニックス！！)	Mizuki Sasaki	Hideki Sonoda	December 31, 2021	July 23, 2022 (United States); August 20, 2022 (Australia)
299	42	"Dangerous! It's an Explosive Breakthrough!!" / Rekindled Flames! Prominence Phoenix! (Part 2); Transliteration: "Denjarasu! Bakuretsu Toppa na no da!!" (Japanese: デンジャラス！爆裂突破なのだ！！)	Keisuke Warita	Hideki Sonoda	January 7, 2022	July 23, 2022 (United States); August 20, 2022 (Australia)
300	43	"Wild Crimson Dance! Prominence Shaker!!" / Scarlet Flurry! Prominence Shaker! (Part 1); Transliteration: "Guren Ranbu! Purominensu Sheikā!!" (Japanese: 紅蓮乱舞！プロミネンスシェイカー！！)	Shigeki Awai	Toshimichi Ōkawa	January 14, 2022	July 30, 2022 (United States); August 21, 2022 (Australia)
301	44	"The Shield Trap of Hatred!!" / Scarlet Flurry! Prominence Shaker! (Part 2); Transliteration: "Nikushimi no Shīrudo Torappu!!" (Japanese: 憎しみのシールドトラップ！！)	Yūsuke Onoda	Hideki Sonoda	January 21, 2022	July 30, 2022 (United States); August 21, 2022 (Australia)
302	45	"Perfect Gear! Chase the Phoenix!!" / Aurora Bound! Chasing the Phoenix! (Part 1); Transliteration: "Pāfekuto Gia! Fushichō o Oe!!" (Japanese: 完全(パーフェクト)ギア！不死鳥を追え！！)	Ryō Miyata	Hideki Sonoda	January 28, 2022	November 5, 2022 (United States); August 20, 2022 (Malaysia); August 27, 2022 (Australia)
303	46	"Scorching-hot! Battle With the High King!!" / Aurora Bound! Chasing the Phoenix! (Part 2); Transliteration: "Shakunetsu! Haō to no Batoru!!" (Japanese: 灼熱！覇王との死闘(バトル)！！)	Yūichi Satō	Toshimichi Ōkawa	February 4, 2022	November 5, 2022 (United States); August 20, 2022 (Malaysia); August 27, 2022 (Australia)
304	47	"Great Uproar! Hell's Gate!!" / Disturbing Disturbance! Phantom's Gate! (Part 1); Transliteration: "Dai Haran! Makai no Mon!!" (Japanese: 大波乱！魔界の門！！)	Shigeru Yamazaki	Hideki Sonoda	February 11, 2022	November 12, 2022 (United States); August 28, 2022 (Australia)
305	48	"My Buddy! Extreme Battle!!" / Disturbing Disturbance! Phantom's Gate! (Part 2); Transliteration: "Ore no Aibō! Ekusutorīmu Batoru!!" (Japanese: 俺の相棒！エクストリームバトル！！)	Yoshiyuki Kumeda	Hideki Sonoda	February 18, 2022	November 12, 2022 (United States); August 28, 2022 (Australia)
306	49	"Great Clash! Bomber and Halo!!" / Ultimate Collision! Devastation and Ring of Light! (Part 1); Transliteration: "Dai Gekitotsu! Bakugeki to Kōrin!!" (Japanese: 大激突！爆撃と光輪！！)	Mizuki Sasaki	Toshimichi Ōkawa	February 25, 2022	November 19, 2022 (United States); September 3, 2022 (Australia)
307	50	"Bonds! Valt vs. Rashad!!" / Ultimate Collision! Devastation and Ring of Light! (Part 2); Transliteration: "Kizuna! Baruto Bāsasu Rashado!!" (Japanese: 絆！バルトVSラシャド！！)	Yūsuke Onoda	Toshimichi Ōkawa	March 4, 2022	November 19, 2022 (United States); September 3, 2022 (Australia)
308	51	"Dangerous vs. Greatest" / Prince vs Prince! Darkness and Light! (Part 1); Transliteration: "Denjarasu Bāsasu Gureitesuto" (Japanese: 魔王(デンジャラス)VS覇王(グレイテスト))	Sotsu Terada	Hideki Sonoda	March 11, 2022	November 26, 2022 (United States); September 4, 2022 (Australia)
309	52	"Explosion! Final Battle!!" / Prince vs Prince! Darkness and Light! (Part 2); Transliteration: "Bakuretsu! Fainaru Batoru!!" (Japanese: 爆裂！ファイナルバトル！！)	Dai Fukuyama	Hideki Sonoda	March 18, 2022	November 26, 2022 (United States); September 4, 2022 (Australia)
