= List of Beyblade X episodes =

Beyblade X is an anime television series and an adaptation of the Beyblade X manga that was announced on May 14, 2023, by Takara Tomy. The anime is produced by OLM and directed by Moto Terada with Dai Fukuyama joining her starting from episode 101, and Katsuhito Akiyama supervising up until episode 100. The character designs are by Yoshihiro Nagamori with Kazuho Hyōdō handling series composition from episodes 1-39, and Hikaru Muno taking over the role starting from episode 38 with Kōji Bandai joining him starting from episode 75. The opening theme song is "Prove" performed by One Ok Rock, originally from their album Luxury Disease, and the ending theme song is "Zoom Zoom" performed by Aespa. A second season was announced on September 13, 2024, and commenced on October 18, 2024. The opening theme was "You Gotta Run" by L'Arc-en-Ciel, and the ending theme was "Cosmic Treat" by Perfume for episodes 1-22. A new opening theme and ending theme was announced for the second season on March 21, 2025. The new opening theme is "Rise" by Tomorrow X Together and the new ending theme is "Stay Gold" by Ado and Jax Jones for episodes 23-49. A third season was announced on September 12, 2025, and commenced on October 24, 2025. The opening theme for the third season is "Invincible" by i-dle and the ending theme is "Vortex" by imase. A fourth season premiered on October 9, 2026. It has also returned to a weekly schedule.

An English dub of the first season premiered on Disney XD, DisneyNow and Hulu in the United States on July 13, 2024, with the first episode being premiered at Anime Expo at the Los Angeles Convention Center in Los Angeles, California on July 6, 2024. An English dub of the second season premiered on Disney XD and DisneyNow in the United States on July 26, 2025.

== Series overview ==
Season	Episodes	Originally released	
Season	Episodes	First released	Last released
1	51	October 6, 2023	October 4, 2024
2	49	October 18, 2024	October 3, 2025
3	34	October 24, 2025	September 18, 2026
4	TBA	October 9, 2026	present

== Episodes ==
=== Season 1 (2023–24) ===
No. overall	No. in season	Title	Directed by (Note: Information is taken from the ending credits of each episode.)	Written by	Storyboarded by	Original release date	English air date
1	1	"X"; Transliteration: "Ekkusu" (Japanese: エックス)	Fumio Ito	Kazuho Hyōdō	Katsuhito Akiyama	October 6, 2023	July 13, 2024
Team Albatross are a team of amateur bladers who have recently arrived in Xenon City. During their very first match, they face Team Phalanx, a professional team whose leader, Takumi Ishiyama, breaks Robin Kazami, Team Albatross' leader's, bey. Afterward, Robin's teammates decide to leave and break up the team, saying he has taken the fun out of blading. Not long after, a strange boy calling himself 'Blader X' invites Robin to be part of a team. The newly formed Team Persona have a rematch against Team Phalanx and defeat them. Afterward, Blader X reveals himself to be current champ Jaxon Cross.
2	2	"The Rainbow Colored Assassin" / Multi-Colored Ambush; Transliteration: "Nanairo no Shikaku" (Japanese: 七色の刺客)	Tatsuya Nagasawa	Kazuho Hyōdō	Moto Terada	October 13, 2023	July 20, 2024
Blader X has signed Team Persona up for a pro selection match... but forgotten that Robin doesn't have a bey. A mysterious girl shows up with a selection of beys, and Robin chooses one called Scythe Incendio. At the match, not only do team Persona discover the girl is their opponent, they learn she is a popular influencer named Multi Nana-iro. After defeating Robin-with a stamina type-Multi gets ready to face Blader X with an entirely different bey.
3	3	"Team Persona"; Transliteration: "Chīmu Perusona" (Japanese: チームペルソナ)	Matsuo Asami	Kazuho Hyōdō	Moto Terada	October 20, 2023	July 27, 2024
4	4	"Bey Sponsor"; Transliteration: "Bei Suponsā" (Japanese: ベイスポンサー)	Ki Sup Lee	Natsumi Morichi	Shigeharu Takahashi	October 27, 2023	August 3, 2024
Team Persona still need to find a sponsor. Jaxon/Blader X has one all picked out: Komaba Sushi,whose president dreamed of going pro when he was younger. After testing them against his secretary- and former pro- Miss Myoden, the president agrees to sponsor Team Persona. Robin is officially chosen as team captain, and they move into the restaurant.
5	5	"Onwards to X Tower" / To The X Transliteration: "Iza X Tawā" (Japanese: いざXタワー)	Ayumi Iemura	Kōji Bandai	Katsuhito Akiyama	November 3, 2023	August 10, 2024
Team Persona visit The X. Jaxon/Blader X and Multi tell Robin, who is visiting for the first time, a bit about it. While there, Robin witnesses his first 4x match-a practice battle with Jaxon- and gets chewed out by Number 1 for not booking the practice space. Later, Multi tells Robin how battles are organized. After watching a live video of a battle between Teams Zooganic and Phalanx, Team Persona learns that the former will be their opponents in their first official match.
6	6	"Lion's Jungle"; Transliteration: "Raionzu Janguru" (Japanese: ライオンズジャングル)	Aya Kawamura	Hikaru Muno	Dojagaken	November 10, 2023	August 17, 2024
7	7	"Team Zooganic"; Transliteration: "Chīmu Zūganikku" (Japanese: チームズーガニック)	Yūsuke Onoda	Yū Satō	Yoshiaki Okumura	November 17, 2023	August 24, 2024
The battle with Team Zooganic gets under way. Multi and Robin battle Toguro, who has a snake themed bey, and Jian, with a rhino themed bey, respectively. With one point all around, Blader X and Titus Manju prepare to face off.
8	8	"The Mask and the Lion King" / The Mask and the King; Transliteration: "Kamen to Shishiō" (Japanese: 仮面と獅子王)	Yoshito Hata	Yoriko Tomita	Takeshi Mori	November 24, 2023	August 31, 2024
Blader X forces a draw against Titus in the first round of their match, but defeats him in the second. Afterward, Number 1 puts words in Robin's mouth during an interview, and the two teams meet outside The X, saying they'd like a rematch someday.
9	9	"Beycrafter"; Transliteration: "Bei Kurafutā" (Japanese: ベイクラフター)	Tatsuya Nagasawa	Natsumi Morichi	Meigo Naito	December 1, 2023	September 7, 2024
After Multi shows Robin what a battle pass is, she spends a few days making a bey that would be easier for him to use. Robin gets to test out this bey, Chain Incendio, in an exhibition match against Multi and Scythe Incendio as part of a business anniversary event. Later, Team Persona learns that their next match is against Team Phalanx.
10	10	"The World of Pros" / The Pro Realm; Transliteration: "Puro no Sekai" (Japanese: プロの世界)	Masahiro Matsunaga	Kōji Bandai	Yoshiaki Okumura	December 8, 2023	September 14, 2024
During Team Persona's match against Team Phalanx, Blader X defeats all three members, including Takumi Ishiyama. Mr. Sushiya tells Team Persona that not all sponsors are the same, and Robin gets a sample of it after overhearing a conversation between Takumi and his sponsor, who threatens to drop him if he doesn't either win flashily or lose spectacularly.
11	11	"Kadovar’s Test" / Warden’s Exam; Transliteration: "Kadobā no Shiken" (Japanese: カドバーの試験)	Kazuma Komatsu	Yū Satō	Takeshi Mori	December 15, 2023	September 21, 2024
Team Persona face the Warden's Exam, where they have to hold out against the Warden for a set amount of time. After Robin fails, he trains hard for a retest, which Team Persona all pass. This allows them to move higher up The X.
12	12	"The Final Battle"; Transliteration: "Saigo no Tatakai" (Japanese: 最後の闘い)	Ryōhei Endō	Kōji Bandai	Yoshiaki Okumura	December 22, 2023	September 28, 2024
Team Persona participate in a tournament where Robin meets soon-to-be retired blader Carlo Maroku, whose final pro match is against Blader X.
13	13	"Fan Number One" / The First Fan; Transliteration: "Fan Daiichigō" (Japanese: ファン第一号)	Ki Sup Lee	Natsumi Morichi	Meigo Naito	January 5, 2024	October 5, 2024
Team Persona are now at The X's twentieth story, but Robin is a little upset about not being as popular as his teammates. During a grocery run,Robin meets a girl named Hina, who admires his determination. Robin is later confronted by some content creators, who challenge him to a beybattle when Hina stands up for him. After two rounds in which his opponents play dirty, Blader X and Multi find Robin.Blader X defeats the content creators in a third round, and Multi threatens to expose their underhanded tactics. In the end, Robin is happy to know he has gained a fan.
14	14	"Ekusu Exercise" / Jax-ercise; Transliteration: "Ekusu Ekusasaizu" (Japanese: エクスエクササイズ)	Yū Yabūchi	Kazuho Hyōdō	Tetsuya Kawaishi	January 12, 2024	October 12, 2024
15	15	"Riddles and Beys"; Transliteration: "Nazo ando Bei" (Japanese: ナゾアンドベイ)	Yūsuke Onoda	Hikaru Muno	Takeshi Mori	January 19, 2024	October 19, 2024
Team Persona visit a theme park called Zonamos House. While there, they take part in its main attraction, a riddle and beybattle house.
16	16	"Noblesse Oblige"; Transliteration: "Noburesu Oburīju" (Japanese: ノブレスオブリージュ)	Tatsuya Nagasawa	Hikaru Muno	Takeshi Mori	January 26, 2024	October 26, 2024
As their final challenge,Team Persona battle Zonamos Nekoyama, the creator of the riddle house. At the end of the episode, the latter is approached by a mysterious figure.
17	17	"Bey Timeshift" / Bey Timeshift; Transliteration: "Bei Taimu Shifuto" (Japanese: ベイタイムシフト)	Yoshito Hata	Natsumi Morichi	Takeshi Mori	February 2, 2024	November 2, 2024
The mysterious Blaze Fujiwara mass- distributes an ultra light-therefore, speedy- bey called Feather Phoenix, in hopes that it will bring about a phenomenon he calls the 'bey timeshift'. Robin becomes aware of this during a meeting with Hina, the rest of Team Persona via the Internet, and Team Zooganic during a fan event.
18	18	"Pride"; Transliteration: "Puraido" (Japanese: プライド)	Hideki Takeda	Kōji Bandai	Shigeharu Takahashi	February 9, 2024	November 9, 2024
19	19	"Datto" / Zip and Zoom; Transliteration: "Datto" (Japanese: ダット)	Koichiro Takatsu	Hikaru Muno	Tetsuya Kawaishi	February 16, 2024	November 16, 2024
Team Persona are invited by Team Zooganic to participate in an event they're hosting called Zip and Zoom, in which any amateurs caught by the pros in a game of tag must beybattle. Due to getting lost, Robin ends up playing with the amateurs and eventually becomes the last blader standing. Afterwards, Titus reveals that the event was in part so people wouldn't obssess over Feather Phoenix.
20	20	"Sushi Memory" / Memories of Sushi; Transliteration: "Sushi no Memorī" (Japanese: 寿司のメモリー)	Ryōhei Endō	Hikaru Muno	Masatoshi Hakata	February 23, 2024	November 23, 2024
Team Persona record a beybattling and sushi-making video in hopes of boosting their popularity, and Robin turns out to be quite the sushi chef!
21	21	"Producing Popularity" / Pop Production; Transliteration: "Mote Purodeyūsu" (Japanese: モテプロデュース)	Yū Yabūchi	Kazuho Hyōdō	Nagisa Miyazaki	March 1, 2024	November 30, 2024
22	22	"Black & White" / Black and White	Kazuma Komatsu & Masahiro Matsunaga & Takafumi Hino	Kōji Bandai	Takeshi Mori	March 8, 2024	December 7, 2024
23	23	"True Heart"; Transliteration: "Hontō no kokoro" (Japanese: 本当の心)	Mitsuo Hashimoto	Natsumi Morichi	Moto Terada	March 15, 2024	December 14, 2024
Multi battles fellow influencer Yuni Naniwa, pushing the latter to do some soul-searching. After Multi wins, it looks like Team Persona might win the next round by default, but Blaze Fujiwara shows up just in time.
24	24	"Arrival of the Fastest"; Transliteration: "Saisoku no Kōrin" (Japanese: 最速の降臨)	Masahiro Matsunaga	Hikaru Muno	Masahiro Matsunaga	March 22, 2024	December 21, 2024
25	25	"Proof of the Fastest"; Transliteration: "Saisoku no Shōmei" (Japanese: 最速の証明)	Yūzō Sasaki	Hikaru Muno	Shigeharu Takahashi	March 29, 2024	December 28, 2024
The second round between Blader X and Blaze Fujiwara ends in a draw, only for the former to defeat the latter in the third round using a technique he calls 'Xtreme Dash Infinite'. Afterwards,Blaze leaves Zonamos and Yuni behind, and they join Team Persona for sushi. Also, strange black envelopes start popping up everywhere.
26	26	"Invitation"; Transliteration: "Inbitēshon" (Japanese: インビテーション)	Yūsuke Onoda	Natsumi Morichi	U:fa	April 5, 2024	January 4, 2025
The envelopes are invitations to the Shuffle Battle Fest, in which the guests will be mixed and matched into temporary teams. Robin worries that he is weighing the team down and considers leaving Persona, but his teammates cheer him up. Multi also reveals some plans so Team Persona can keep a united front.
27	27	"An Unyielding End" / The End of Persistence; Transliteration: "Fukutsu no Saigo" (Japanese: 不屈の最後)	Ki Sup Lee	Kōji Bandai	Shigeharu Takahashi	April 12, 2024	January 11, 2025
Takumi Ishiyama relentlessly defies a bunch of amateurs-and Robin- until Blaze Fujiwara appears and ensures Takumi and Team Phalanx can remain pro. Also, the teams are announced for the Shuffle Battle Fest.
28	28	"The King and The Phoenix"; Transliteration: "Ō to Fenikkusu" (Japanese: 王とフェニックス)	Chako Sato	Hikaru Muno	Tetsuya Kawaishi	April 19, 2024	January 18, 2025
The first battle of the Battle Fest is Between Blaze Fujiwara, Jian Strong,and Number 1, dubbed 'Team Strong' and Blader X, Titus Manju and Taisho Sushiya, dubbed 'Team King and Sushi'. The first round, which opposes Blaze and Titus, ends in a draw.
29	29	"Mask and Meat Buns"; Transliteration: "Kamen to Nikuman" (Japanese: 仮面と肉まん)	Yoshito Hata	Hikaru Muno	Masatoshi Hakata	April 26, 2024	January 25, 2025
In the second round, Blader X barely defeats Jian. In the third round, Number 1 uses an android to play against Taisho, and the latter wins. Afterwards, Khrome Ryugu shows up for an exhibition match against the android.
30	30	"Riddles and Popularity" / Riddles and Pop; Transliteration: "Nazo to Mote" (Japanese: ナゾとモテ)	Mitsuo Hashimoto	Kazuho Hyōdō	Toshiki Hirano	May 3, 2024	February 1, 2025
31	31	"My Friends" / My Teammates; Transliteration: "Boku no Nakama" (Japanese: ボクの仲間)	Koichiro Takatsu	Natsumi Morichi	Takashi Kojima	May 10, 2024	February 8, 2025
32	32	"New Partner"; Transliteration: "Atarashii Aibou" (Japanese: 新しい相棒)	Ryōhei Endō	Kōji Bandai	Yoshiaki Okumura	May 17, 2024	February 15, 2025
33	33	"The Index Finger Promise" / Our Promise; Transliteration: "Hitosashiyubi no Yakusoku" (Japanese: 人差し指の約束)	Yūzō Sasaki	Hikaru Muno	Masatoshi Hakata	May 24, 2024	February 22, 2025
As Miss Myoden battles Jian and the former's ex-teammates look on, more is learned about her past.
34	34	"Multi-Colored Visitor" / A Rainbow Guest; Transliteration: "Nanairo no Raikyaku" (Japanese: 七色の来客)	Yū Yabūchi	Hikaru Muno	Toshiki Hirano	May 31, 2024	March 1, 2025
Sigrid Nana-iro, Jaxon's former teammate and Multi's older sister, stops by Komaba Sushi. After failing to convince Jaxon to return to his old team, she battles Robin and her sister.
35	35	"Dream Competition" / The Dream Contest; Transliteration: "Yume no Kyōen" (Japanese: 夢の競演)	Yūsuke Onoda	Kōji Bandai	Shigeharu Takahashi	June 7, 2024	March 8, 2025
Team Persona must face the three bladers who garnered the most individual votes, who form a team called the Dreams. The first match opposes Robin and Packun, an influencer known for copying beys. Only, the version of Hammer Incendio Packun uses is a little too perfect...
36	36	"Bladership"; Transliteration: "Burēdāshippu" (Japanese: ブレーダーシップ)	Ki Sup Lee	Natsumi Morichi	Tokihiro Sasaki	June 14, 2024	March 15, 2025
37	37	"Unpredictable"; Transliteration: "Yosoku Funō" (Japanese: 予測不能)	Takashi Kojima	Kazuho Hyōdō	Takashi Kojima	June 21, 2024	March 22, 2025
38	38	"Return of the Queen"; Transliteration: "Joō no Kikan" (Japanese: 女王の帰還)	Mayu Tanimoto	Hikaru Muno	Masahiro Matsunaga	June 28, 2024	March 29, 2025
The final round opposes Blader X and living legend -and Titus' grandmother- Quinn Manju. Using her 'Bag of Knowledge', she predicts an easy, quick victory.
39	39	"The Greatest Blader"; Transliteration: "Saikō no Burēdā" (Japanese: 最高のブレーダー)	Yoshito Hata	Hikaru Muno	Toshiki Hirano	July 5, 2024	April 5, 2025
The battle between Blader X and Quinn Manju does not go as predicted, with him defeating her. Afterward,Robin is challenged by someone calling themselves 'Blader Y'.
40	40	"The Other Mask"; Transliteration: "Mō Hitotsu no Kamen" (Japanese: もうひとつの仮面)	Ryōhei Endō	Yukie Sugawara	Yoshiaki Okumura	July 12, 2024	April 12, 2025
After defeating Robin, Blader Y goes on to battle other bladers who have faced Blader X, getting the same results as him.
41	41	"The Three Masks"; Transliteration: "Mittsu no Kamen" (Japanese: 3つの仮面)	Yoshikazu Ueki	Kōji Bandai	Kobii Mametomi	July 19, 2024	April 19, 2025
Jaxon disappears after being forbidden to battle Blader Y and the recently arrived Blader Z. Multi and Robin search for him, and discover he has been challenging random people as Blader X. Blader Z appears and confronts Jaxon as Blader X just as his teammates catch up with him.
42	42	"XYZ"	Shigatsu Yoshikawa	Natsumi Morichi	Shigeharu Takahashi	July 26, 2024	April 26, 2025
Blader X's battle with Blader Z is interrupted by Blader Y, whom Blader X ultimately battles. At the end of the episode, Jaxon formally identifies Blader Y as Khrome Ryugu.
43	43	"Pendragon, Back Then"; Transliteration: "Ano Hi No Pendoragon" (Japanese: あの日のペンドラゴン)	Yūzō Sasaki	Hikaru Muno	U:fa	August 9, 2024	May 3, 2025
As Blader Z formally joins Team Pendragon, Khrome remembers how the team got together. He also reflects on his connection with Jaxon, and how he felt when the latter left.
44	44	"Family, Back Then"; Transliteration: "Ano Hi No Kazoku" (Japanese: あの日の家族)	Yū Yabūchi	Hikaru Muno	Kobii Mametomi & Tetsuya Kawaishi	August 16, 2024	May 10, 2025
Multi tells Robin Scythe Incendio's backstory.
45	45	"You, Back Then"; Transliteration: "Ano Hi No Anata" (Japanese: あの日のあなた)	Hideki Takeda	Hikaru Muno	Masatoshi Hakata	August 23, 2024	May 17, 2025
Blader Z -whose real name is Ciel Kaminari- reflects on his career path, and how he came to don the mask. It turns out that Khrome was a major factor in both.
46	46	"Off" / Time Off; Transliteration: "Ofu" (Japanese: オフ)	Yūsuke Onoda	Kōji Bandai	Yoshiaki Okumura & Tetsuya Kawaishi	August 30, 2024	May 24, 2025
Team Persona are ordered to have a day off. As Multi relaxes and updates everyone's beys, Robin and Jaxon/Blader X visit the former's hometown, where Robin gets a warmer welcome than he thought. He also ends up giving the local kids a beyblade seminar.
47	47	"Battle at the Top"; Transliteration: "Chōjō Kessen" (Japanese: 頂上決戦)	Masatsune Ōi & Rika Mashiko	Yukie Sugawara	Masatoshi Hakata	September 6, 2024	May 31, 2025
After a restless night,the day of the title match arrives. The first round will oppose Multi and Sigrid.
48	48	"Multi-Colored Showdown" / The Nana-iro Showdown; Transliteration: "Nanairo no Ketchaku" (Japanese: 七色の決着)	Takashi Kojima	Natsumi Morichi	Takashi Kojima	September 13, 2024	June 7, 2025
49	49	"Invisible Things" / Something Xtraordinary; Transliteration: "Mienai Mono" (Japanese: ミエナイモノ)	Koichiro Takatsu	Hikaru Muno	U:fa & Tetsuya Kawaishi	September 20, 2024	June 14, 2025
The second match opposes Blader X and Khrome Ryugu. After Blader X easily defeats Khrome in the first round, the latter unveils a new bey, the left spinning Cobalt Dragoon, which he uses in an intense second round. Also, Khrome appears to have some ghostly help during the match...
50	50	"The Two Xs"; Transliteration: "Futari no X" (Japanese: ふたりのX)	Yūzō Sasaki	Hikaru Muno	Tetsuya Kawaishi	September 27, 2024	June 21, 2025
51	51	"The Best Play" / The Most Fun Ever; Transliteration: "Saikō no Asobi" (Japanese: 最高の遊び)	Yū Yabūchi	Hikaru Muno	Katsuhito Akiyama	October 4, 2024	June 28, 2025
For the third match, Robin faces an unmasked Ciel Kaminari. Despite Ciel getting an early lead, Robin wins the fourth round, but then loses the fifth... by a hair.Despite Team Persona's loss, Robin admits he really enjoyed himself.

=== Season 2 (2024–25) ===
No. overall	No. in season	Title	Directed by	Written by	Storyboarded by	Original release date	English air date
52	1	"Restart"; Transliteration: "Risutāto" (Japanese: リスタート)	Yoshito Hata	Kōji Bandai	Masatoshi Hakata	October 18, 2024	July 26, 2025
After the buzz has died down following the title match, Multi has kept busy, Robin and Jaxon, less so. The latter in particular has become listless after defeating Khrome. Multi reveals that it's very likely Team Persona will face Teams Zooganic and Yggdrasil again, and livestreams a beybattle between Robin and Miss Myoden in order to stay in the public eye. Meanwhile, Team Pendragon are pressured to either get back in the public eye or find Khrome, who has disappeared, and someone is spying on Team Persona.
53	2	"Signs of a New Era"; Transliteration: "Shin Jidai no Yochō" (Japanese: 新時代の予兆)	Chako Sato	Kenichi Yamashita	Norio Nitta	October 25, 2024	August 2, 2025
During a battle with Team Cretaceous, Titus Manju of Team Zooganic reveals a new bey, Crest Leone. During a subsequent practice session with Team Persona, Titus reveals that they should be facing Team Yggdrasil, but the latter are studiously avoiding Team Zooganic. Not long after, both teams are baited into meeting at Yggdrasil Research headquarters, only for the encounter to be mysteriously interrupted.
54	3	"Path of Resolve"; Transliteration: "Ketsui no Michi" (Japanese: 決意の道)	Hideki Takeda	Yukie Sugawara	Kanako Watanabe	November 1, 2024	August 9, 2025
55	4	"Advance Bey Timeshift"; Transliteration: "Saranaru Bei Taimushifuto" (Japanese: 更なるベイタイムシフト)	Yūsuke Onoda	Natsumi Morichi	Kobii Mametomi	November 8, 2024	August 16, 2025
Takumi Ishiyama visits Yggdrasil research to help Blaze fine-tune a new bey, but is interrupted by a visit from Karla Konjiki, Blaze's 'fiancée'. Meanwhile, Multi is experiencing crafter's block and tries a few things, including visiting Packun and her sister, in order to break through it.
56	5	"White Conspiracy" / Star Plot; Transliteration: "Shiroki Inbō" (Japanese: 白き陰謀)	Masatsune Ōi	Hikaru Muno	Ichizō Kobayashi	November 15, 2024	August 23, 2025
The watcher, one Tenka Shiroboshi, shows up at Komaba Sushi hoping to challenge Blader X. However, since he is gone for the day, she ends up battling Miss Myoden and Robin, defeating both. She also tries battling Multi, but the latter desists. After Tenka leaves, Team Persona get a message from Quinn Manju, and it is revealed that Tenka pulled some strings to organize something. Meanwhile, seeing Tenka's bey makes Multi feel insecure.
57	6	"Three-Way Battle" / Tri-Blader Battle; Transliteration: "Mitsudomo e no Tatakai" (Japanese: 三つ巴の戦い)	Mitsuo Hashimoto & Hideaki Yamada	Kōji Bandai	Tetsuya Kawaishi	November 22, 2024	August 30, 2025
Teams Persona, Yggdrasil, and Zooganic are invited to test drive a new beybattle format:three-way battles where the last blader standing at the end of the round wins all points earned. The first round opposes Toguro,Yuni, and Robin. While Robin puts on a good show, Yuni and Team Yggdrasil ultimately earn the round's four points.
58	7	"Triple Battle"; Transliteration: "Toripuru Batoru" (Japanese: トリプルバトル)	Ki Sup Lee	Kenichi Yamashita	Takebumi Anzai	November 29, 2024	October 4, 2025
Multi fights Zonamos and Jian, who gang up against her. Multi's win earns Team Persona two points. The next round should oppose Titus Manju,Blader X, and Blaze Fujiwara, but Blader X is out of commission due to indigestion. Tenka Shiroboshi suggests she replace him, styling herself as 'Blader S'.
59	8	"Mask S" / Blader S Transliteration: "Kamen Esu" (Japanese: 仮面S(エス))	Yūzō Sasaki	Natsumi Morichi	Masafumi Yamaguchi & Yoshiki Hirai	December 6, 2024	October 11, 2025
During the battle between Blaze, Titus, and Blader S, Blaze introduces his new bey, Rudder Phoenix. However, both are handily beaten by Blader S and her Saber Samurai. Her win earns Team Persona five points, making them the winners with seven overall. Tenka/Blader S formally becomes Team Persona's substitute player. Also, a new type of Beystadium is introduced which has a second ramp that can appear at random. Warden and Number 1-with some help from her android friend- test it out during an exhibition match.
60	9	"Multi-Colored Trial"; Transliteration: "Nanairo no Shiren" (Japanese: 七色の試練)	Yū Yabūchi	Natsumi Morichi	Hiroto Nakaya & Kaoruko Nishiyama	December 13, 2024	October 18, 2025
Tenka challenges Multi and defeats two of the latter's beys. Robin proposes a match against him after Tenka insults Multi, but is interrupted by Jaxon's arrival.Meanwhile, Team Yggdrasil do some background research on Tenka/Blader S, and Team Zooganic start a new training regimen.
61	10	"Invincible"; Transliteration: "Hisshōfuhai" (Japanese: 必勝不敗)	Yoshito Hata	Kōji Bandai	Masatoshi Hakata	December 20, 2024	October 25, 2025
Tenka and Jaxon/Blader X have a match in one of the new beystadiums with a wager attached to it: if Tenka wins, Jaxon will have to obey an order of hers,if Jaxon wins, she will give him the opportunity to face a very powerful blader. Jaxon wins. Meanwhile,Tenka's insults combine with Multi's crafter's block and push her to leave.
62	11	"Private Bey Academy" / The Prestigious Bey Academy; Transliteration: "Shiritsu Bei Akademī" (Japanese: 私立ベイアカデミー)	Takashi Kojima	Yukie Sugawara	Takashi Kojima	December 27, 2024	November 1, 2025
Multi visits the Bey Academy in order to see her former instructor Professor Megaoka and-hopefully- relearn bey crafting from the bottom up.Instead, the professor tricks Multi into giving a lecture, which boosts her confidence a bit. Multi also remembers her initial stay at the Academy. After wards, Professor Megaoka encourages Multi to go on a training journey if she feels like she needs one. Meanwhile, Robin discovers Multi is missing and gets worried.
63	12	"The Manju Clan"; Transliteration: "Manjūke no Ichizoku" (Japanese: 万獣家の一族)	Mitsuo Hashimoto	Kenichi Yamashita	Masakatsu Iijima	January 10, 2025	November 8, 2025
64	13	"The Shapeless Shadow"; Transliteration: "Katachi Naki Kage" (Japanese: 形無き影)	Hajime Sasaki	Natsumi Morichi	Yoshimi Katsumata	January 17, 2025	November 15, 2025
Multi, who has been staying with Titus' family, confides her doubts to Titus' mother Joka. Meanwhile, Team Phalanx have their first match in Solidus Tower, Robin visits Packun in order to train with his gadgets, and Team Zooganic keep up their training.
65	14	"The Wings of a New Beginning" / First Flight; Transliteration: "Hajimari no Tsubasa" (Japanese: 始まりの翼)	Koichiro Takatsu	Kōji Bandai	Kanako Watanabe	January 24, 2025	November 22, 2025
After training together, Tenka asks Robin how he came to pursue beyblade and join Team Persona. He tells her that it all started when he befriended a new boy in town named Tsubasa, who turns out to be a talented blader. Before long, beyblade fever sweeps the town, with Robin as the only holdover... until a bully named Clay shows up hoping to challenge Tsubasa.
66	15	"Something Captivating"; Transliteration: "Muchū ni Nareru Mono o" (Japanese: 夢中になれるものを)	Masatsune Ōi	Yukie Sugawara	Masatoshi Hakata	January 31, 2025	November 29, 2025
Robin challenges Clay, but since he is the only non-blader in town, Tsubasa ends up battling Clay on his behalf. Watching the match and,later, taking part in one himself, makes Robin realize that he could like blading after all. Tsubasa moves away again, and Robin is eventually inspired to form Team Albatross, his former team.
67	16	"The Silver Wolf"; Transliteration: "Gin no Ōkami" (Japanese: 銀の狼)	Hideki Takeda	Natsumi Morichi	Noriaki Saito	February 7, 2025	December 6, 2025
Robin and Blader X visit Packun, who tells them there are a lot of counterfeit beys around, not just the kind he makes. Not long after, a video airs where it seems Packun has been kidnapped. Afterward, Jaxon/Blader X takes Robin and Tenka to meet his mentor, a man named Ginro. When they find him, he is in the middle of a match with two people using counterfeit versions of Khrome's beys.
68	17	"Above and Below" / Light and Dark; Transliteration: "Omote to Ura" (Japanese: 表と裏)	Ki Sup Lee	Kenichi Yamashita	Takebumi Anzai	February 14, 2025	December 13, 2025
Ginro tells Team Persona that the counterfeit users are part of a group called 'shadow bladers' whose aim is world domination. After he tries to recruit Jaxon, Tenka reminds him of their wager.Jaxon, Tenka and Ginro decide to resolve this with a three-way battle, which Jaxon wins. After discovering that Packun's kidnapping video is real, Team Persona agree to join forces with Ginro and Ciel, who is also training under Ginro, for a rescue.
69	18	"The Underworld" / Shadowy Underground; Transliteration: "Ura no Sekai" (Japanese: 裏の世界)	Yūzō Sasaki	Kōji Bandai	Tetsuya Kawaishi	February 21, 2025	December 20, 2025
As Ginro, Ciel, Blader X, and Robin reach the warehouse where Packun is being held, they discover him working quite happily with his would-be kidnappers.Shadow bladers find them and multiple beybattles ensue.Among them is a man named Byte, who challenges Ciel to a beybattle in a new kind of beystadium. At first, Ciel uses a replica of Cobalt Dragoon, but a frustrated Packun gives him some beys he perfected. Ciel defeats Byte with one of these-subsequently named Shelter Drake- and the rescue crew leave with Packun, but not before Ginro threatens to destroy the warehouse.
70	19	"Demon Dragon" / Dread Dragon; Transliteration: "Maryū" (Japanese: 魔龍)	Yūsuke Onoda	Hikaru Muno	Hiroto Nakaya & Kaoruko Nishiyama	February 28, 2025	January 24, 2026
As we learn more about Solidus Tower, Ciel takes on Team Cretaceous all by himself during a demonstration match. After the match, Byte appars and offers Ciel a sinister looking bey, which he refuses.
71	20	"To That Place"; Transliteration: "Sono Basho e" (Japanese: その場所へ)	Yū Yabūchi	Hikaru Muno	Yoshiki Hirai	March 7, 2025	January 31, 2026
It turns out that after Khrome collapsed during his battle against Jaxon/Blader X, he was taken in by Team Zodiac. Once Khrome has recovered enough, he is given the opportunity to meet them. Their leader offers Khrome the same type of sinister bey as Ciel was offered and proposes to make him an ally. Unlike Ciel, Khrome accepts the bey and tests his newfound strength by defeating one hundred opponents.
72	21	"The Enigmatic Labyrinth of Fear"; Transliteration: "Kyōfu no Nazo Meikyū" (Japanese: 恐怖の謎迷宮)	Yoshito Hata	Natsumi Morichi	Tokihiro Sasaki	March 14, 2025	February 14, 2026
Team Persona help run a haunted riddle house with a beyblade battle at the end, during which Robin is cursed to always lose. Afterward, Teams Pendragon and Zodiac have a match.After the latter win, their leader, Omega Shiroboshi, announces the Tournament of Stars, the victor of which will get to face Team Zodiac.
73	22	"The Star Battle"; Transliteration: "Sutā Batoru" (Japanese: 白星決闘(スターバトル))	Masatsune Ōi & Rika Mashiko	Kenichi Yamashita	Takebumi Anzai	March 21, 2025	February 14, 2026
As the Tournament of Stars gets underway, Team Gordias, whose leader is Karla Konjiki, seeks out Team Persona.For reasons known only to her, Tenka ensures that Jaxon/Blader X can't compete.
74	23	"The Curse" / Cursed; Transliteration: "Noroi" (Japanese: 呪い)	Hajime Sasaki	Masanao Akahoshi	Yoshimi Katsumata	March 28, 2025	February 21, 2026
Robin battles both Karla and Reiyu Kuhabara, the blader who 'cursed' him, resulting in two losses. As Tenka pressures him to go back into the arena a third time, Multi appears and intervenes.
75	24	"Return of the Knight"; Transliteration: "Ritān obu Naito" (Japanese: リターンオブナイト)	Hideaki Yamada	Kōji Bandai	Noriaki Saito	April 4, 2025	February 28, 2026
Multi returns from her travels and takes on Reiyu using a new bey she made for herself, Mail Knight. The resulting win earns Team Persona back one of their stars.
76	25	"White Nova"; Transliteration: "Shiroki Shinsei" (Japanese: 白き新星)	Michita Shiraishi	Kōji Bandai	Takashi Kojima	April 11, 2025	March 7, 2026
77	26	"The Blue Dragon and the Demon Dragon" / Blue Dragon and Dread Dragon; Transliteration: "Aoki Ryū to Maryū" (Japanese: 青き龍と魔龍)	Yūzō Sasaki	Hikaru Muno	Tetsuya Kawaishi	April 18, 2025	March 14, 2026
Jaxon eagerly responds to a summons from Khrome. When they meet up, Khrome considers challenging Jaxon with Impact Drake, his new, sinister bey but then reconsiders, since he wouldn't like to see Jaxon defeated. Afterward, Multi tells everyone what she was up to while she was gone. When Jaxon and Robin request new beys, Tenka gets Multi some data she can use. Later, Khrome also meets Blaze.
78	27	"Customize" / Customization; Transliteration: "Kasutamaizu" (Japanese: カスタマイズ)	Tatsuya Nagasawa	Natsumi Morichi	Noriaki Saito	April 25, 2025	March 21, 2026
Teams Yggdrasil and Zooganic talk about what led them to get customized beyblades and some discoveries made on a personal level along the way.
79	28	"King and Queen"; Transliteration: "Ō to Joō" (Japanese: 王と女王)	Masatsune Ōi	Kenichi Yamashita	Takebumi Anzai	May 2, 2025	March 28, 2026
Packun pressures Quinn Manju to take part in the tournament, which she does, as part of Team Dream, but just for one match
80	29	"The Slowest" / The Gradual One; Transliteration: "Saichi no Mono" (Japanese: 最遅の者)	Hideki Takeda	Masanao Akahoshi	Tetsuya Kawaishi	May 9, 2025	April 4, 2026
Takumi Ishiyama is invited to a talk show hosted by Blaze Fujiwara, but leaves when Karla Konjiiki shows up. After leaving the studio, he finds the rest of Team Phalanx embroiled in a match with two men wearing power-enhancing suits. The men challenge Takumi to a three on three battle, and , after showcasing what he calls 'ultimate slowness', Takumi wins and earns Team Phalanx back their stars.
81	30	"All In"; Transliteration: "Ōruin" (Japanese: オールイン)	Fumihiro Ueno	Kōji Bandai	Takebumi Anzai	May 16, 2025	May 30, 2026
82	31	"Multi-Colored Determination" / Multi-Colored Decision; Transliteration: "Nanairo no Ketsui" (Japanese: 七色の決意)	Takashi Kojima	Hikaru Muno	Takashi Kojima	May 23, 2025	June 6, 2026
Following their loss to team Zodiac, Team Pendragon, especially Ciel, are in a slump. As Sigrid is giving Ciel a talking-to, Multi arrives to challenge her sister. Using Arc Wizard, another new bey, Multi finally manages to defeat Sigrid and narrowly escapes becoming a temporary member of Team Pendragon. Despite losing, Sigrid is happy for her sister and admits that she now sees blading differently. Also, Tenka tags along for the match and reveals that she and Multi have at least one thing in common: Both aim to defeat a family member.
83	32	"Partner"; Transliteration: "Aibō" (Japanese: 相棒)	Hajime Sasaki	Hikaru Muno	Masatoshi Hakata	May 30, 2025	June 13, 2026
Robin struggles to use-and connect with- his new bey, Reaper Incendio. As a result, he does some meditating and training which culminates in a battle with Edward/The Warden.
84	33	"Proxy War" / Proxy Conflict; Transliteration: "Dairi Sensō" (Japanese: 代理戦争)	Masatsune Ōi & Rika Mashiko	Natsumi Morichi	Kaoruko Nishiyama	June 6, 2025	June 20, 2026
As Robin keeps up his training, Titus' twin brother and sister, the crafters of the Manju Clan, come to town to watch their big brother compete against Team Persona in a challenge that spotlights Beycrafters. However, they get a chance to battle Multi when they start disagreeing with each other and acting as individuals.
85	34	"Popularity vs. Curse" / Pop vs. Curse; Transliteration: "Mote vs. Noroi" (Japanese: モテVS.呪い)	Yoshito Hata	Kenichi Yamashita	Yoshimi Katsumata	June 13, 2025	June 27, 2026
Team Gordias seek out Team Yggdrasil during the Tournament. In the ensuing beybattle, Iwao defeats Zonamos in the first round, and despite Reiyu trying to curse Yuni in the second round, the latter wins.
86	35	"Crimson Showdown" / Red Confrontation; Transliteration: "Shinku no Taiketsu" (Japanese: 深紅の対決)	Yūsuke Onoda	Masanao Akahoshi	Takebumi Anzai	June 20, 2025	July 4, 2026
The final round opposes Blaze and Karla, who bets all the stars Team Gordias has won so far. Blaze, who suspects she is gong to throw the match in order to give them to him, scolds her and tells her to put her heart into it. Karla ultimately defeats Blaze, who praises her skill. This makes Team Gordias reach a much higher rank. Later, Team Gordias are defeated by Team Mislead.
87	36	"The Path of the Demon Dragon" / Path of the Dread Dragon; Transliteration: "Maryū no Michi" (Japanese: 魔龍の道)	Yūzō Sasaki	Hikaru Muno	Tetsuya Kawaishi	June 27, 2025	July 11, 2026
Sigrid phones Ciel to tell him she suspects that B4, the major beyblade organization, is in cahoots with Team Zodiac and Omega. Meanwhile, Khrome comes across two Shadow Bladers in an alley and defeats them. Byte appears and challenges Khrome as well. After his defeat, Byte invites Khrome to join the Shadow Bladers. Khrome accepts.Later Blaze appears and battles Khrome in order to 'bring him back to the light.' However, Khrome defeats Blaze and says he has thrown in his lot with the Shadow Bladers.
88	37	"Bey Spirit" / Blading Soul; Transliteration: "Bei Tamashī" (Japanese: ベイ魂)	Yū Yabūchi	Natsumi Morichi	Kanako Watanabe	July 4, 2025	July 18, 2026
Sigrid is looking for ways to get stronger, so after trying to lead her through a workout, Ciel tells her about Ginro. When Sigrid seeks him out, at first Ginro believes she wants to retrieve Khrome. When Sigrid tells him she wants to be his apprentice, Ginro has a beybattle with her, which he loses, then tests her out in other ways. Ultimately, Ginro agrees to help Sigrid train.
89	38	"Things to Achieve" / What Must Be Done; Transliteration: "Hatasubeki Koto" (Japanese: 果たすべきこと)	Hideki Takeda	Kōji Bandai	Kaoruko Nishiyama	July 18, 2025	July 25, 2026
90	39	"Nine-Tailed Fox"; Transliteration: "Kyūbi no Kitsune" (Japanese: 九尾のキツネ)	Fumihiro Ueno	Kenichi Yamashita	Ichizō Kobayashi	July 25, 2025	August 1, 2026
91	40	"Dream Match"; Transliteration: "Dorīmu Matchi" (Japanese: ドリームマッチ)	Masatsune Ōi & Rika Mashiko	Masanao Akahoshi	Tetsuya Kawaishi	August 1, 2025	August 8, 2026
92	41	"Perseus the Messenger"; Transliteration: "Peruseusu no Shisha" (Japanese: ペルセウスの使者)	Tatsuya Nagasawa	Hikaru Muno	Noriaki Saito	August 8, 2025	August 15, 2026
93	42	"Super Summit Challenger Showdown" / Super Champion Challenger Chooser Match; Transliteration: "Chō Chōjō Chōsen-sha Kettei-sen" (Japanese: 超頂上挑戦者決定戦)	Yoshito Hata	Natsumi Morichi	Takebumi Anzai	August 15, 2025	August 22, 2026
94	43	"Mislead" / Unknown; Transliteration: "Misurīdo" (Japanese: ミスリード)	Yūsuke Onoda	Kenichi Yamashita	Noriaki Saito	August 22, 2025	August 29, 2026
Blader X and Tenka defeat Ryu and Enka, respectively, of Team Mislead, only for their leader, Yoko Kyubi, to attempt blackmailing Team Persona into a third round. Meanwhile, Robin keeps up his training.
95	44	"The Fox's Seven Forms, The Tanuki's Eight Forms" / Foxes Enchant, Tanukis Bewitch; Transliteration: "Kitsune shichibake, Tanuki wa hachi Bake" (Japanese: 狐七化け 狸は八化け)	Rika Mashiko	Masanao Akahoshi	Noriaki Saito	August 29, 2025	September 5, 2026
96	45	"Shiroboshi, Back Then"; Transliteration: "Ano Hi no Shiroboshi" (Japanese: あの日の白星)	Yū Yabūchi	Hikaru Muno	U:fa	September 5, 2025	September 12, 2026
Tenka remembers growing up as part of the Shiroboshi School, her mother's desertion, and the events that led her to become assistant master and own Saber Samurai. Also, Robin returns from training, and Team Persona celebrate by having a fun day together.
97	46	"Star Battle Grand Final"; Transliteration: "Sutā Batoru Gurando Fainaru" (Japanese: 白星最終決闘(スターバトルグランドファイナル))	In-Bum Hwang & Won-Hoi Kim	Hikaru Muno	Masatoshi Hakata	September 12, 2025	September 19, 2026
Team Persona face Team Zodiac, and at Omega's urging, the match is formatted as three sudden death rounds. Blader X comes under investigation, and so shouldn't compete, but Tenka finds a loophole, and has Jaxon compete -and win- against Milion... as himself, with Multi wearing the Blader X costume.
98	47	"I Absolutely Won't Lose" / Never Defeated; Transliteration: "Zettai ni Makenai" (Japanese: 絶対に負けない)	Hideaki Yamada	Hikaru Muno	Hideaki Yamada	September 19, 2025	September 19, 2026
As Jaxon sneaks away to avoid the media, Robin faces Lance. The resulting Beybattle end in a draw.
99	48	"Supernova"; Transliteration: "Sūpānova" (Japanese: スーパーノヴァ)	Yūzō Sasaki	Hikaru Muno	Tetsuya Kawaishi	September 26, 2025	September 26, 2026
The next round opposes Tenka and Omega and, despite the former's best efforts, including a new bey and a technique inspired by Jaxon/Blader X, her mother still beats her. The score is now 1 win each and a draw...
100	49	"The X That Devours the Stars" / Star Devourer; Transliteration: "Hoshi o Kurau Mono" (Japanese: 星を喰らうX(もの))	Takashi Kojima	Hikaru Muno	Katsuhito Akiyama	October 3, 2025	September 26, 2026
Jaxon battles Omega in a tiebreaker, and to everyone's surprise, defeats her. After the battle, Tenka says she will return to the Shiroboshi School, but that she won't forget her time as a member of Team Persona. In the ending clip show, we see, among other things, Titus' siblings and Multi visiting Packun, Team Mislead working out, Ginro, Sigrid and Ciel sharing a meal, Tenka, Lance and Milion training new students, and Team Yggdrasil hosting a tea party with Team Gordias.

=== Season 3 (2025–26) ===
No. overall	No. in season	Title	Directed by	Written by	Storyboarded by	Original release date	English air date
101	1	"Destruction" / Annihilation; Transliteration: "Metsubō" (Japanese: 滅亡)	Megumi Yamamoto	Kōji Bandai	Shōma Mutō & Tetsuya Kawaishi & Hideaki Yamada	October 24, 2025	October 3, 2026
The buzz has died down, and Team Persona are now Super Champions. Despite their status, Team Persona still yearns for a rematch against a Team Pendragon that includes Khrome Ryugu. Multi reminds Robin of what their status means for the blading community as Team Persona get ready to participate in a fan event where anyone can challenge them. The last challenger of the day is a mysterious girl who forces a draw against Blader X and addresses him as 'Jaxon' when she leaves. Later, Team Persona learn that other pros have been challenged and beaten during other, similar events. Team Persona worry that Jaxon's secret will get out, but the challenger shows up and says she won't say anything. She introduces herself as Nine Cross, Jaxon's sister, and says that destruction is imminent.
102	2	"The Second X" / Another X Transliteration: "Futatsu no X" (Japanese: ニつのX)	Yūki Morita & Yūki Tobita	Masanao Akahoshi	Takebumi Anzai	October 31, 2025	October 3, 2026
After Nine delivers her news, a second X appears out of nowhere, followed by a hologram of Nine and Jaxon's father Zero, who vows to destroy modern blading and says that his children are scattered everywhere in Xenon City in order to challenge-and upstage- pro bladers. Jaxon agrees to help Nine thwart her father's plans, partly out of love for Xenon City, partly for the chance to battle his siblings. He gets the opportunity when Eight, who has been following his sister, shows up at Komaba Sushi and challenges Jaxon.
103	3	"Bey of the Future"; Transliteration: "Mirai no Bei" (Japanese: 未来のベイ)	Hajime Sasaki	Natsumi Morichi	Noriaki Saitō	November 7, 2025	October 10, 2026
Jaxon and Eight engage in a high speed beybattle. Multi flashes back to Jaxon testing new bey until she had to take them back and give him a replica. Jaxon defeats Eight. Nine warns Multi that the Cross family have futuristic beycrafting technology beyond her abilities. Nine and Multi argue over their beycrafting abilities and who should make new beys for Persona. Ginro is hanging out with Sigrid and Ciel when Three and Four appear to challenge him.
104	4	"The Wolf and the Sun" / Wolf and Sun; Transliteration: "Ōkami to Taiyō" (Japanese: 狼と太陽)	Hideki Takeda	Kenichi Yamashita	Kaoruko Nishiyama	November 14, 2025	October 17, 2026
Ginro, who has obtained a new bey, is challenged by Three and Four Cross, whose bey, Umbra Sol, has two distinct iterations. After Ginro defeats Four, he is easily defeated by Three, as are Sigrid and Ciel. Meanwhile, Multi and Nine hit it off and agree to design a bey together.
105	5	"A Challenge from the Future" / Challenge from the Future; Transliteration: "Mirai kara no Chōsen-jō" (Japanese: 未来からの挑戦状)	Tatsuya Nagasawa	Kō Yoneyama	Tatsuya Nagasawa	November 21, 2025	October 24, 2026
Members of the Cross family battle other pro teams, including Team Zooganic, and defeat them . Afterward, Three and Four Cross send Team Persona a video inviting them to a match in order to avenge Sigrid and Ciel. Multi and Nine show off the fruit of their collaboration: Might Emperor, a bey that is powerful on its own, but can also enhance Team Persona's regular beys. Bolstered, Team Persona send Three and Four a response video accepting the challenge.
106	6	"As the Super Summit" / As the Super-Champions; Transliteration: "Chō Chōjō to shite" (Japanese: 超頂上として)	Fumihiro Ueno	Masanao Akahoshi	Noriaki Saitō	November 28, 2025	October 31, 2026
Three and Four Cross accept the challenge . On the appointed day, Blader X insists on a three-way match against Three and Four. His Might Emperor-enhanced Courage Dran defeats the two iterations of Umbra Sol, restoring the people's faith in The X and pro bladers, which was starting to waver. However, it is learned that some higher-ups have thrown in their lot with the Cross Family. After the match, Nine makes an inspiring statement, and Zero introduces another sibling, One.
107	7	"The Dyed Phoenix" / Tarnished Phoenix; Transliteration: "Somaru Fushi Chō" (Japanese: 染まる不死鳥)	Yoshito Hata	Natsumi Morichi	Noriaki Saitō	December 5, 2025	November 7, 2026
Blaze summons Karla in order to hear about her match against the Cross Family. Afterwards,he wonders whether their vision of the future is that different from the Bey Timeshift. Soon after, One Cross is spotted at Yggdrasil Research. After defeating the rest of Team Yggdrasil in a three-way battle, One introduces Blaze to some of the Cross Family's futuristic tech in order to sway him to their side. Meanwhile, Team Persona's victory is bittersweet, since they are the only pro team to have defeated the Crosses.
108	8	"X City’s Saviour" / Savior of Xenon City; Transliteration: "X Shiti no Kyūseishu" (Japanese: Xシティの救世主)	Masatsune Ōi	Kenichi Yamashita	Masatsune Ōi	December 12, 2025	November 14, 2026
Packun livestreams a video of himself 'infiltrating' the Cross Family's version of The X.Once inside, he ends up in a lab-like area and meets another Cross sibling, Five. The latter issues a challenge, and Packun battles him with copies of the Cross Family beys encountered so far. Packun later posts a video about the weaknesses of the Cross Family beys and meets up with Yoko.
109	9	"The End of the Demon Dragon" / End of the Dread Dragon; Transliteration: "Maryū no Owari" (Japanese: 魔龍の終わり)	Tatsuya Nagasawa	Hikaru Muno	Tetsuya Kawaishi	December 19, 2025	November 21, 2026
Khrome, who has been having nightmares/hallucinations, is provoked by Byte until he collapses. One Cross finds him and takes him to their X to recover. Once Khrome has recovered, One invites him to join their cause and takes him to meet Five, the Cross Family's crafter, who wants to use Khrome in a beyblade experiment of sorts. In order to do so, Khrome is given a bey named Meteoroid Dragoon. After using it in the experiment, Khrome says that Meteoroid Dragoon is the bey that will allow him to equal or surpass Jaxon. When Khrome next sees Byte, he says that he will be a strong Shadow Pro, but will forge his own path. Meanwhile, Team Persona visit Packun and find out he supports them. In return they give Packun a confidence boost about his skills, despite their unsavory usage. Jaxon also says he feels they will face Khrome someday soon.
110	10	"The Counterattack Signal" / Counterattack Beacon; Transliteration: "Hangeki no Noroshi" (Japanese: 反撃の狼煙)	Yū Yabūchi	Kō Yoneyama	Akihiro Enomoto	December 26, 2025	November 28, 2026
111	11	"Pro Blader" / Pro Bladers; Transliteration: "Puro Burēdā" (Japanese: プロブレーダー)	Yūki Morita & Yūki Tobita	Masanao Akahoshi	Hideaki Yamada	January 9, 2026	December 5, 2026
Several pro bladers have responded to a video sent by Titus Manju, encouraging them to fight back against the Crosses. During an event in which Three, Four, and Eight can be faced, Sigrid challenges Three and Four in a three-way battle, while Yoko challenges Eight. To the Cross siblings' surprise, the pros win. As Three and Four prepare to face Team Zooganic, Jaxon finds himself wishing he could participate, only for Five Cross to show up.
112	12	"Crafter vs. Crafter" / Crafter vs Crafter; Transliteration: "Kurafutā tai Kurafutā" (Japanese: クラフターVS.(たい)クラフター)	Rika Mashiko	Kenichi Yamashita	Akira Nishimori	January 16, 2026	December 12, 2026
Five wants to challenge Jaxon, but the latter convinces him to face Multi instead. After Multi's Might Emperor enhanced Arc Wizard defeats Five's Curse Mummy, Five wants to destroy it, but Multi stops him. He later tells Team Persona about Khrome's visit, and how he wanted to experiment with Jaxon to create an 'Ultimate Xtreme Dash'. Meanwhile Titus and Rex defeat Three , Four, and Eight during Titus' event. Later, Zonamos and Yuni show up at Komaba Sushi, saying Blaze has been kidnapped.
113	13	"The Phoenix's Choice" / Phoenix's Choice; Transliteration: "Fushichō no Sentaku" (Japanese: 不死鳥の選択)	Michita Shiraishi	Natsumi Morichi	Genta Shiroyama	January 23, 2026	TBA
114	14	"Towards the Future" / Facing the Future; Transliteration: "Mirai e Mukatte" (Japanese: 未来へ向かって)	Daisuke Hashimoto	Kō Yoneyama	Daisuke Hashimoto	January 30, 2026	TBA
115	15	"Transfer or Disbandment" / Transfer or Disband; Transliteration: "Iseki Ka Kaisan Ka" (Japanese: 移籍か解散か)	Yūzō Sasaki	Masanao Akahoshi	Tetsuya Kawaishi	February 6, 2026	TBA
116	16	"Future Pros"; Transliteration: "Mirai Puro" (Japanese: 未来プロ)	Yoshito Hata	Kōji Bandai	Noriaki Saitō	February 13, 2026	TBA
117	17	"Expanding Power" / Growing Power; Transliteration: "Kakuchō suru Chikara" (Japanese: 拡張するチカラ)	Masatsune Ōi & Rika Mashiko & Miki Sugiyama	Natsumi Morichi	Masatsune Ōi	February 20, 2026	TBA
One defeats Mr. Gigatama and give the latter a Bey named Blitz Bahamoot, which Mr.Gigatama tests out against various launching robots. Meanwhile, Khrome decides to leave the Shadow Bladers and has Byte send a challenge to Jaxon on his behalf. Also, Zero urges his children to prevent such a match from happening, Multi and Nine work on a complicated new bey for Jaxon, and regular pros consitently face future pros, some more successfully than others.
118	18	"Intertwining Intentions" / Motive to Motive; Transliteration: "Meguru Omowaku" (Japanese: 巡る思惑)	Tatsuya Nagasawa	Kenichi Yamashita	Noriaki Saitō	February 27, 2026	TBA
119	19	"To That Distant Place" / To The Place; Transliteration: "Ano Basho e" (Japanese: あの場所へ)	Fumihiro Ueno	Kō Yoneyama	Fumihiro Ueno	March 6, 2026	TBA
120	20	"X Tower War" / Clash at The X Transliteration: "X Tawā Uō" (Japanese: Xタワーウォー)	Yūki Morita & Yūki Tobita	Masanao Akahoshi	Tetsuya Kawaishi	March 13, 2026	TBA
Jaxon heads up The X to rendezvous with Khrome, only to find his path blocked by the Cross Family. Robin, Multi, and Nine take on Eight, Five, and Three and Four, respectively, so Jaxon can continue. Draws are forced in the first round, and the siblings win the second. To Team Persona's surprise, Tenka, Lance, and Milion show up to help. Meanwhile, Jaxon reaches the top of The X, and Khrome also heads to the rendezvous only to be stopped by Mr. Gigatama, who challenges Khrome in order to 'put him in his place', only for Ciel to take up the challenge on Khrome's behalf.
121	21	"Where the Dragon Goes" / The Dragon's Destination; Transliteration: "Ryū no Yukue" (Japanese: 龍の行方)	Yū Yabūchi	Hikaru Muno	Katsuhito Akiyama	March 20, 2026	TBA
Ciel battles Gigatama,but is defeated. To the surprise of both, Khrome doubles back to face Gigatama himself. After the latter's defeat, Khrome rejects Gigatama's offer of an alliance and tells Ciel he has no place in his life. Meanwhile, One Cross meets Sigrid, and the two are about to battle when Omega Shiroboshi steps in. Also, Tenka, Lance and Milion keep the other Cross siblings at bay so Team Persona can join Jaxon at the top of The X. At the end of the episode, someone finds Jaxon there.
122	22	"The Future Beyond"; Transliteration: "Sono Saki no Mirai" (Japanese: その先のX(みらい))	Yūzō Sasaki	Hikaru Muno	Moto Terada	March 27, 2026	TBA
123	23	"One Percent of Hope" / One Percent Hope; Transliteration: "Ichi Pāsento Kibō" (Japanese: 1%の(パーセント)希望(きぼう))	Takashi Kojima	Kōji Bandai	Masakatsu Iijima	April 17, 2026	TBA
124	24	"True X Tower War" / The True X Battle Royale; Transliteration: "Ma X tawāu~ō" (Japanese: 真・Xタワーウォー)	Rika Mashiko & Miki Sugiyama & Masatsune Ōi	Kenichi Yamashita	Kaoruko Nishiyama	April 17, 2026	TBA
125	25	"The Strongest Without Desire" / Strength Without Motive; Transliteration: "Muyoku no Saikyō" (Japanese: 無欲の最強)	Tatsuya Nagasawa	Natsumi Morichi	Yoshimi Katsumata & Hajime Sasaki	May 1, 2026	TBA
126	26	"The Traitor Who Betrayed" / The Betrayer Betrays; Transliteration: "Uragitta Uragirimono" (Japanese: 裏切った裏切り者)	Marie Watanabe	Masanao Akahoshi	Tetsuya Kawaishi	May 15, 2026	TBA
127	27	"The Kurosu Clan's Strategy" / Cross Tactics; Transliteration: "Kurosu no Gunryaku" (Japanese: 黒須の軍略)	Michita Shiraishi	Kōji Bandai	Hideaki Yamada	June 5, 2026	TBA
128	28	"X Tower's Guardian" / Protector of the X Transliteration: "X Tawā no Shugosha" (Japanese: Xタワーの守護者)	Kenichi Yamashita	Noriaki Saitō	Yūsuke Onoda	June 19, 2026	TBA
129	29	"Natural Talent" / Natural Gift; Transliteration: "Tenpu no Sai" (Japanese: 天賦の才)	Fumihiro Ueno	Masanao Akahoshi	Fumihiro Ueno	July 3, 2026	TBA
130	30	"Welcome to the Fourth Stage" / Fourth Stagey-wagey; Transliteration: "Fōsu Sutēji da yu ~" (Japanese: フォースステージだゆ~)	Masatsune Ōi & Miki Sugiyama	Natsumi Morichi	Kaoruko Nishiyama	July 17, 2026	TBA
131	31	"Betting on the Future" / With the Future on the Line; Transliteration: "Mirai o Kakete" (Japanese: 未来をかけて)	Hajime Sasaki	Kōji Bandai	Noriaki Saitō	August 7, 2026	TBA
132	32	"The True Battle at the Top" / True Super Champion Match; Transliteration: "Shin Chō Chōjō Kessen" (Japanese: 真・超頂上決戦)	Yoshito Hata	Kenichi Yamashita	Tetsuya Kawaishi	August 21, 2026	TBA
133	33	"The Final Future"; Transliteration: "Saigo no Mirai" (Japanese: 最後の未来)	Yūzō Sasaki	Hikaru Muno	Tetsuya Kawaishi	September 4, 2026	TBA
134	34	"The True Final Future"; Transliteration: "Shin Saigo no Mirai" (Japanese: 真・最後の未来)	Hideaki Yamaada	Hikaru Muno	Hideaki Yamada	September 18, 2026	TBA

=== Season 4 (2026–present) ===
No. overall	No. in season	Title	Directed by	Written by	Storyboarded by	Original release date	English air date
135	1	"Version 2.0"; Transliteration: "Bājon 2.0" (Japanese: バージョン2.0)	Yū Yabūchi	Kōji Bandai	Genta Shiroyama	October 9, 2026	TBA
136	2	"The 88th Prince"; Transliteration: "Dai 88 Ōji" (Japanese: 第88王子)	Hajime Sasaki	Masanao Akahoshi	Tetsuya Kawaishi	October 16, 2026	TBA
137	3	"Bey Kingdom"; Transliteration: "Bei Kingudamu" (Japanese: ベイキングダム)	Miki Sugiyama & Masatsune Ōi	Natsumi Morichi	Noriaki Saitō	October 23, 2026	TBA
138	4	"The Kingdom's Way"; Transliteration: "Ōkoku no Ryūgi" (Japanese: 王国の流儀)	Yoshito Hata	Kenichi Yamashita	Noriaki Saitō	October 30, 2026	TBA
139	5	"The Dazzling True Dragon"; Transliteration: "Mabayuki Matatsu" (Japanese: 眩き真龍(まばゆ))	Yūzō Sasaki	Kōji Bandai	Moto Terada	November 6, 2026	TBA
140	6	"Transformation"; Transliteration: "Henkaku" (Japanese: 変革(へんかく))	Fumihiro Ueno	Masanao Akahoshi	Fumihiro Ueno	November 13, 2026	TBA
141	7	"The Axe That Severs Regrets"; Transliteration: "Miren o Tatsu Ono" (Japanese: 未練を断つ斧)	Hajime Sasaki	Natsumi Morichi	Noriaki Saitō	November 20, 2026	TBA
142	8	"The Royal Bey Academy"; Transliteration: "Ōritsu Bei Akademī" (Japanese: 王立ベイアカデミー)	TBA	TBA	TBA	November 27, 2026	TBA
143	9	"Selfish Ideals"; Transliteration: "Katte na Risō" (Japanese: 勝手な理想)	TBA	TBA	TBA	December 4, 2026	TBA
