= Beyblade Burst Rise =

- Season 4
- Key Visual
- No. of episodes: 52 (Japanese version); 26 (English version)

Release
- Original network: YouTube (CoroCoro, Takara Tomy)
- Original release: April 5, 2019 – March 27, 2020

Season chronology
- ← Previous; Burst Turbo Next → Burst Surge

Beyblade Burst Rise, known in Japan as Beyblade Burst GT (ベイブレードバーストGT(ガチ), Beiburēdo Bāsuto Gachi) is a 2019 original net animation series and the fourth season of Beyblade Burst. The series, consisting of 52 12-minute episodes, premiered on the CoroCoro and Takara Tomy YouTube channels starting April 5, 2019. The Japanese release of this season had the 52 episodes standalone while the international release combined two episodes together to make 26 episodes.

The series was animated by OLM. The first 27 episodes were produced by D-rights and the rest by ADK Emotions, a wholly owned subsidiary of Asatsu-DK formed after it acquired the entirety of D-rights. An English dub of the anime premiered on Disney XD in the United States on February 8, 2020.

The Japanese opening theme for the season is "Gatti'n'Roll!" by Kei Iwasaki and the ending theme is the instrumental version of "Gatti'n'Roll!" The English theme for the season is "Rise" by Jonathan Young; an instrumental version of the English theme is used for the credits.

== Episode list ==
No. overall	No. in season	Japanese Translated title/English title	Original release date	English air date
154	1	"Time to Get Serious! Ace Dragon!" / Ace Dragon! On the Rise! Transliteration: "Gachi da ze Ēsu Doragon!" (Japanese: ガチだぜエースドラゴン！)	April 5, 2019	January 17, 2020 (New Zealand); February 8, 2020 (United States); March 7, 2020 (Canada)
One year after the title battle between Valt Aoi and Aiger Akabane, Meet Dante Koryu and his Gamma Bey, Ace Dragon! After training under Legendary Blader Valt Aoi, Dante is ready to kick things up a notch by traveling to Japan, the birthplace of Beyblade, to learn everything he can about Blading and Hyper-Flux. His first opponent is the King of the Blading District, Arman Kusaba. It's time for Dante to rise up!
155	2	"Keep on Going! Bushin Ashura!" / Lookin' Awesome! Bushin Ashindra! Transliteration: "Iga Su Ze Bushin'Ashura!" (Japanese: イガすぜブシンアシュラ!)	April 12, 2019	January 17, 2020 (New Zealand); February 8, 2020 (United States); March 7, 2020 (Canada)
Not long after arriving in Japan, Dante joins his uncle's team, the Victories, and soon runs into some familiar faces. Coming from the famous BC Sol, Dante's got a lot to prove to his new teammates, but after losing to Arman, does he have what it takes?
156	3	"Seer-iously!? Wizard Fafnir!" / Abracadabra! Wizard Fafnir! Transliteration: "Ma jika!? Wizādo Fabuniru!" (Japanese: 魔ジカ！？ウィザードファブニル！)	April 19, 2019	January 24, 2020 (New Zealand); February 8, 2020 (United States)
While training, Dante stumbles across a high-tech gym run by the Spark Wings. Not ready to give up their new recruit, the Victories swoop in to prove to Dante there's more to a Bey club than just fancy equipment!
157	4	"The Fiery Grand Dragon!" / From the Flames! Glyph Dragon! Transliteration: "Honō no Guran Doragon!" (Japanese: 炎のグランドラゴン！)	April 26, 2019	January 24, 2020 (New Zealand); February 8, 2020 (United States)
Inspired by his match against Spark Wings' captain Fumiya Kindo, Dante decides it's finally time to take Dragon to the next level. Say hello to the new stamina powerhouse on the block, Glyph Dragon! But before Dante can to draw out its full power, he'll have to rework his launch technique.
158	5	"Dragon vs Fafnir!"; Transliteration: "Doragon vs Fafnir!" (Japanese: ドラゴンVSファブニル！)	May 3, 2019	January 31, 2020 (New Zealand); February 15, 2020 (United States)
In an attempt to humiliate the Victories, Fumiya challenges Dante to a battle that will be broadcast around the country! With thousands of eyes watching, can Dante defend his club's honor against the Bey Carnival's reigning champ?
159	6	"Explosive Speed! Grand Beat!" / Explosive Speed! Glyph Strike! Transliteration: "Bakusō Guran Bīto!" (Japanese: 爆速グランビート！)	May 10, 2019	January 31, 2020 (New Zealand); February 15, 2020 (United States)
Dante may have lost the first point to Fumiya, but he refuses to let another one go! A shocking conclusion to the match sees a stampede of new Bladers rushing to join the Victories. Despite the enthusiasm, Delta seems to be the only one unimpressed by Dante's skills.
160	7	"Valt, I Challenge You!" / Inspiration! Challenging Valt! Transliteration: "Baruto ni Chōsen da-!" (Japanese: バルトに挑戦だーッ！)	May 17, 2019	February 8, 2020 (New Zealand); February 22, 2020 (United States)
Valt Aoi stops by to see the Victories. But before Dante can battle him, Arman steps up and issues a challenge of his own! After seeing Valt enter Hyper-Flux, Dante is inspired to evolve Dragon even further. Meanwhile, a mysterious figure appears.
161	8	"The Exciting Bey Carnival!" / Get Hype! Bey Carnival! Transliteration: "Moerotsu Bei Kānibaru!" (Japanese: 燃えろッベイカーニバル！)	May 24, 2019	February 8, 2020 (New Zealand); February 22, 2020 (United States)
The Bey Carnival is finally here and that means one thing: super-epic battles incoming! Valt Aoi himself is the guest of honor, and with the new Hyper Stadium being unveiled, our Bladers are more pumped than ever! But new faces have come from far and wide, presenting roadblocks for Dante and crew on their path to winning the tournament.
162	9	"All-In! Judgement Joker!" / Transliteration: "Ōruin Jajjimento Jōkā!" (Japanese: オールイン♠︎! ジャッジメントジョーカー!)	May 31, 2019	February 15, 2020 (New Zealand); February 29, 2020 (United States)
Dante and Arman have made it to the final eight of the Bey Carnival! With the matchups announced, Arman is the next Blader from the Victories to take on Joe and his Bey, Joker. After back-to-back losses, the Victories and Arman are hoping third time's the charm.
163	10	"It's a Gatinko Battle in The Best Four!" / Rising Battles! Semifinals! Transliteration: "Gachi Batoru da ze Besuto 4!" (Japanese: ガチバトルだぜベスト4！)	June 7, 2019	February 15, 2020 (New Zealand); February 29, 2020 (United States)
The Bey Carnival has finally reached the semifinals! Fumiya offers Lodin the chance to join the Spark Wings, but the Blading powerhouse gives him the brush-off. Meanwhile, Dante and the Victories strategize about whether he should go with Rock, Glyph, or Ace Dragon for his match against Joe.
164	11	"Serious vs. Tricks!" / The Final Hand! Transliteration: "Gachi vs. Torikku!" (Japanese: ガチvsトリック!)	June 14, 2019	February 21, 2020 (New Zealand); March 7, 2020 (United States)
Judgement Joker's unpredictability has Dante even more confused than usual! As the match heats up, Dante decides to take a risk and goes into full-on attack mode! After the dust settles on Joe and Dante's showdown, Fumiya and Lodin rise up to the ring.
165	12	"Heavy Steel! Zwei Longinus!" / Heavy Steel! Zone Lúinor! Transliteration: "Jū Hagane Zwei Longinus!" (Japanese: 重鋼ツヴァイロンギヌス！)	June 21, 2019	February 21, 2020 (New Zealand); March 7, 2020 (United States)
In the last match of the semi-finals, it's the defending champ Fumiya against the crazy-strong athlete Lodin. Everyone is excited to watch these two titans clash—even Fumiya's little sister Ichika can't look away! After the battle, Fumiya and Ichika have a heart-to-heart.
166	13	"I've Got This! Go, Shoot!" / Bey Carnival! Epic Final! Transliteration: "Kimeru ze Gachi Shūto!" (Japanese: 決めるぜっガチシュート！)	June 28, 2019	February 28, 2020 (New Zealand); March 14, 2020 (United States)
At last, the final match of the Bey Carnival is here! If Dante wants to beat elite athlete Lodin Haijima, he'll need to make his launch way more powerful! But when Lodin taunts Dante by predicting a 5-second Burst Finish, can Dante keep Lodin from getting into his head?
167	14	"Serious Burst! Gold Turbo!" / Rise and Shine! Hyper-Flux! Transliteration: "Gachinko Sakuretsu Gōrudo Tābo!" (Japanese: ガチンコ炸裂ゴールドターボ！)	July 5, 2019	February 28, 2020 (New Zealand); March 14, 2020 (United States)
The Bey Carnival final is heating up and Lodin has taken the lead. Can Dante prove he didn't come all this way for nothing? After the winner is crowned, Delta, the newest member of the Risen 3, challenges Dante to an unexpected battle.
168	15	"Drum vs Delta!" / Dante vs Delta! Transliteration: "Doramu Vs. Deruta!" (Japanese: ドラムvsデルタ!)	July 12, 2019	March 7, 2020 (New Zealand); March 21, 2020 (United States)
As Dante and Delta continue their battle, Dante reflects on their shared history. When Dragon fails to enter Hyper-Flux, Delta questions Dante's power. Delta makes to leave, but it seems his Bey, Devolos, has another idea.
169	16	"Bey of The Devil! Devolos!" / The Demon Bey! Devolos! Transliteration: "Akuma no Bey, Diaborosu!" (Japanese: 悪魔のベイ、ティアボロス!)	July 19, 2019	March 7, 2020 (New Zealand); March 21, 2020 (United States)
Dragon may have entered Hyper-Flux, but even that wasn't enough to defeat the mighty Delta and his Devolos! When Dante and Delta clash yet again, Devolos unleashes a completely different battle style. After so many losses, does Dante have any chance against one of the Risen 3?
170	17	"Fly, Heaven Pegasus!" / Flying High! Harmony Pegasus! Transliteration: "Hishō, Hebun Pegasasu!" (Japanese: 飛翔、ヘブンペガサス！)	July 26, 2019	March 13, 2020 (New Zealand); March 28, 2020 (United States)
After Dante's loss to Delta, Tango decides it's time to take the Victories on a training journey around the world to battle even more powerful Bladers! At the Castle in the Clouds, the Victories meet Pheng Hope, a member of the Risen 3 who has never lost a single battle. With unnatural talent and a self-healing Bey, Pheng is bound to be a formidable foe!
171	18	"The Most Sinister Art! Dread Bahamut!" / Dangerous Art! Dusk Balkesh! Transliteration: "Sai kyō Āto, Doreddo Bahamūto!" (Japanese: 最凶アート、ドレッドバハムート)	August 2, 2019	March 13, 2020 (New Zealand); March 28, 2020 (United States)
In a secluded mountain villa, Delta Zakuro faces off against fellow Risen 3 member, Blindt DeVoy. With his artist's eye, Blindt is able to capture a glimpse of Delta's true self, which only makes him more excited to battle! Delta and Devolos are hungry to take Blindt on, but do they have what it takes to defeat this Blading virtuoso?
172	19	"Flash! Shining Cross!" / Flash of Light! Shining Crux! Transliteration: "Senkō, Shainingu Kurosu!" (Japanese: 閃光、シャイニングクロス！)	August 9, 2019	April 3, 2020 (Ukraine); April 4, 2020 (United States)
Delta and Blindt's epic battle comes to an exciting conclusion. After Blindt prevents him from entering Hyper-Flux, Delta realizes it's time to kick things up a notch! After all, there can only be one shining star in the Blading sky. Elsewhere, Pheng brings the Victories back to his temple so that Arman can make good on his promise.
173	20	"Airhead vs God's Child!" / Dante vs Pheng! Transliteration: "Tennen VS Kami no Ko!" (Japanese: 天然VS神の子！)	August 16, 2019	April 4, 2020 (United States); April 4, 2020 (Ukraine)
Despite Dante's insistence, Pheng refuses to battle him. Pheng later reveals that his natural talent at everything has the unexpected effect of making life boring. Maybe battling against Dante will bring him the excitement he's been looking for all along.
174	21	"Battle in The Sky!" / Battle in the Skies! Transliteration: "Tenkū no tatakai!" (Japanese: 天空の戦い！)	August 23, 2019	April 5, 2020 (Ukraine); April 11, 2020 (United States)
Dante gets another chance to battle the Blading miracle, Pheng! This time there's more on the line than pride; if Dante wins, he might be able to convince Pheng to let Arman go. On the other side of the stadium, Pheng hopes to catch another glimpse of Dante's Hyper-Flux.
175	22	"The Emerging Six! Battle Journey!" / Showdown at Battle Island! Transliteration: "Derokku! Batoru Jānī!" (Japanese: 出ろッ6！バトルジャーニー!)	August 30, 2019	April 6, 2020 (Ukraine); April 11, 2020 (United States)
Dante and Arman compete in the Blading circuit at Battle Island! They'll be going up against the best Bladers from all around the world, including each member of the Risen 3. But the ultimate test will be against none other than the Legendary Blader and World Champion Aiger Akabane! Can Dante and Arman rise up to face off against Aiger?
176	23	"Spin! Battle! Win!" / Spin! Advance! Survive! Transliteration: "Mawase! Susume! Kachinokore!" (Japanese: 回せ！進め！勝ち残れ！)	September 6, 2019	April 6, 2020 (Ukraine); April 18, 2020 (United States)
Dante wants to be the first Blader to finish the Battle Island race and face off against Aiger. There's just one problem: he's up against Blindt DeVoy of the Risen 3! Will Dante even make it past the first round?
177	24	"Clash in The GT 3!" / Stand-off! Pheng vs Delta! Transliteration: "Gekitotsu GT3!" (Japanese: 激突 GT3!)	September 13, 2019	April 7, 2020 (Ukraine); April 18, 2020 (United States)
With only two rolls of the dice, Arman's already made it all the way to Stage 12 of 18! Can he land one more six and be the first to battle Aiger? Hot on his tail, Pheng and Delta collide! What kind of battle do these Risen 3 members have in store?
178	25	"A Challenge to Aiga!" / The Final Stage! Facing Aiger! Transliteration: "Aiga ni chōsenda!" (Japanese: アイガに挑戦だーッ！)	September 20, 2019	April 7, 2020 (Ukraine); April 25, 2020 (United States)
Fresh off their recent victories, Dante, Arman, and Delta are the final Bladers left to face reigning World Champion Aiger and claim the title for themselves. But who will be the first to face him in battle and go toe to toe with the legend himself?
179	26	"It's Serious! Drum vs Aiga!" / Rise Up! Dante vs Aiger! Transliteration: "Gachi! Dorumu VS Aiga!!" (Japanese: ガチ！ドラムVSアイガ!!)	September 27, 2019	April 8, 2020 (Ukraine); April 25, 2020 (United States)
Dante's time has finally arrived! After Arman's crushing defeat, Dante finally gets his chance to battle the World Champion. Can he do what Arman couldn't? Meanwhile, hungry to prove himself against Aiger, Delta's convinced that Dante doesn't have what it takes to win.
180	27	"Shine! My Gold Turbo!" / Shining Bright! Hyper-Flux! Transliteration: "Kirameke, Ore no Gōrudo Tābo!" (Japanese: 煌け、オレのゴールドターボ！)	October 4, 2019	April 8, 2020 (Ukraine); May 2, 2020 (Australia); July 11, 2020 (United States)
In the wake of a devastating Burst Finish, Dante's only got one more shot to take down Aiger. Can Dante stage a comeback, or is he just not on the same level as the World Champion? Only the next battle will tell!
181	28	"Super Z! Aiga vs Delta!" / Turbo Battle! Aiger vs Delta! Transliteration: "Chōzetsu! Aiga vs Delta!" (Japanese: 超ゼツ！アイガvsデルタ!)	October 11, 2019	April 9, 2020 (Ukraine); May 2, 2020 (Australia); July 11, 2020 (United States)
After Dragon's evolved Hyper-Flux proved no match for Aiger's Union Achilles, it's Delta's turn to step up. Everyone is excited to see which Blader will pull off the ultimate victory. But just as the battle reaches its climax, a mysterious intruder tears the tournament apart before a victor can be crowned.
182	29	"Assault! King of Hell - Arthur!" / Invasion! The New King! Transliteration: "Shūrai! Heru no ō Āsā!" (Japanese: 襲来！HELLの王・アーサー!)	October 18, 2019	April 9, 2020 (Ukraine); May 3, 2020 (Australia); July 18, 2020 (United States)
A mysterious Blader named Arthur has interrupted the final match of the Battle Island circuit, announcing a new Blading age built on darkness and power. Now, as the official World Champion, Aiger must face Arthur to keep the Beyblade world from falling into despair!
183	30	"The Bey of Demise! Apocalypse!" / Bey of Annihilation! Apocalypse! Transliteration: "Shūen no Bei! Apokaripusu!" (Japanese: 終焉のペイ、アポカリプス！)	October 25, 2019	April 10, 2020 (Ukraine); May 3, 2020 (Australia); July 18, 2020 (United States)
Dante and Delta each challenge Arthur, but the self-proclaimed King of Beyblade is confident he can defeat them both at the same time! Can they team up to defeat Apocalypse, or will their inability to work together spell disaster!?
184	31	"Serious Birth! Imperial Dragon!" / Rebirth! Command Dragon! Transliteration: "Gachitan! Inperiaru Doragon!" (Japanese: ガチ誕!インペリアルドラゴン!)	November 1, 2019	April 10, 2020 (Ukraine); May 9, 2020 (Australia); July 25, 2020 (United States)
Dante struggles to rebuild Dragon after his devastating defeat. With Arthur's twisted style of Blading taking over the world, Dante's running out of time! Meanwhile, an inquisitive newcomer named Gwyn appears with a Bey that looks eerily similar to Apocalypse.
185	32	"Battle at Hell Tower!" / Battle at the Infernal Tower! Transliteration: "Heru Tawā no tatakai!" (摩天楼(ヘルタワー)の戦い!)	November 8, 2019	April 11, 2020 (Ukraine); May 9, 2020 (Australia); July 25, 2020 (United States)
Armed with his re-forged Command Dragon, Dante heads straight to the Infernal Tower to take on Arthur! But some familiar faces are blocking his path. Will Dante prevail, or will his rebellion against Arthur end at the front gates?
186	33	"Genesis Activates!!" / Genesis in Motion! Transliteration: "Jeneshisu hatsudō!!" (ジェネシス発動!!)	November 15, 2019	May 10, 2020 (Australia); August 1, 2020 (United States)
With the completion of Royal Genesis, Gwyn lets it rip in battle for the very first time! Dante offers some friendly advice, but how will a total newbie fare against a Blader as experienced as Joe Lazure?
187	34	"Diabolos' Counterattack!!" / Devolos' Revenge! Transliteration: "Gyakushū no Diaborosu!!" (逆襲のディアボロス!!)	November 22, 2019	May 10, 2020 (Australia); August 1, 2020 (United States)
Delta crashes the showdown at the Infernal Tower and challenges Arthur to a match that will put his claim of Apocalypse's invincibility to the test. Has he really discovered Apocalypse's weakness? Devolos and Apocalypse go head to head in an epic rematch!
188	35	"Dragon vs Apocalypse!" / Dragon vs Apocalypse! Transliteration: "Doragon VS Apokaripusu!" (ドラゴンVSアポカリプス!)	November 29, 2019	May 16, 2020 (Australia); August 8, 2020 (United States)
After a shocking conclusion to the match between Delta and Arthur, it's time for Dante to face Apocalypse! With only one night to prepare a strategy, Dante gives everything he's got to make sure Dragon comes out on top!
189	36	"Can It Be Broken!? The Infinite Lock System!" / Put to The Test! Unburstable Bey! Transliteration: "Yabureru ka!? Mugen Rokku Shisutemu!" (破れるか！？無限ロックシステム!)	December 6, 2019	May 16, 2020 (Australia); August 8, 2020 (United States)
Despite his best efforts, Dante has already lost one point to Arthur! Can he rise up and pull off an unlikely victory? The whole Blading world is watching!
190	37	"Dragon vs Genesis!" / Transliteration: "Doragon VS Jeneshisu!" (最高(ドラゴン)VS完全(ジェネシス)！)	December 13, 2019	June 20, 2020 (New Zealand); August 15, 2020 (United States)
Dante's epic triumph over Arthur ignites his fame in the Blading world as a hero! Intrigued by his win, Gwyn asks Dante to battle him next! Meanwhile, Delta thinks of leaving the world of Blading behind. Can Valt bring him back!?
191	38	"Aurora! Superior Turbo!" / Aurora! Superior-Flux! Transliteration: "Kyokukō! Superioru Tābo!" (極光！スペリオルターボ!)	December 20, 2019	June 20, 2020 (New Zealand); August 15, 2020 (United States)
In spite of Dante's recent success, Gwyn lands the first point against Dragon! Dante's wary of Genesis's Superior-Flux, but he is ready to rise up to the challenge. The Blading world is about to find out who's really on top!
192	39	"Revive! Diabolos!" / Rebirth! Master Devolos! Transliteration: "Yomigaere Diaborosu!" (蘇れッディアボロス!)	December 27, 2019	June 27, 2020 (New Zealand); August 22, 2020 (United States)
Fired up from his most recent loss, Dante trains harder than ever to become as strong as Gwyn and Genesis. However, training is interrupted with news of a major match at the Infernal Tower! Someone is hungry for revenge against Arthur; can Delta redeem himself with his newly resurrected Devolos?
193	40	"Shine! Master Smash!" / Burning Bright! Master Smash! Transliteration: "Kageyake, Masutā Sumasshu!" (輝けッマスタースマッシュ!)	January 3, 2020	June 27, 2020 (New Zealand); August 22, 2020 (United States)
Delta's taken the lead over Arthur, but now he has to finish as strong as he started. Will trying to win with a Burst Finish spell disaster? Everyone is on edge to see if Delta can pull off the ultimate comeback and win it all!
194	41	"Creation of The World! Big Bang Genesis!" / Ultimate Creation! Eclipse Genesis! Transliteration: "Sōsei! Bigguban Jeneshisu!!" (創世! ビッグバンジェネシス!!)	January 10, 2020	July 4, 2020 (New Zealand); August 29, 2020 (United States)
Furious over his loss to Delta, Arthur seeks to level up Inferno by convincing Gwyn to join the fight against the Victories! With Gwyn's newly-evolved Eclipse Genesis, Arthur is sure he'll get his revenge. Meanwhile, Delta's return to the stadium has taken Dante and Arman's training to a whole new level, but the news of Arthur's arrival in the Blading District has them all on edge.
195	42	"Super Speed! Super Spinning! Super Attack!" / Hyper Training! Exhibition Match! Transliteration: "Chōsoku! Chōten! Chōgeki!" (超速！超転！超撃!)	January 17, 2020	July 4, 2020 (New Zealand); August 29, 2020 (United States)
Valt invites Dante and Arman to face off in the new Hyper Warp Stadium! But the battle is barely underway when Arthur crashes the party and challenges them to an epic team battle. Dante and Arman accept, but who will battle alongside them as their third Blader!?
196	43	"Shine, Ashura!" / Shining Ashindra! Transliteration: "Hikare Ashura!" (光れッ武神(アシュラ)！)	January 24, 2020	July 11, 2020 (New Zealand); September 5, 2020 (United States)
With the addition of Delta, the Victories are training harder than ever before, in the hopes of taking Inferno down! Seeing how far Dante's come, Arman fears he's fallen behind. Can training with Delta strengthen his bond with Ashindra and unlock Arman's Hyper-Flux before prep time runs out?
197	44	"A Serious Showdown! wbba. VS HELL!" / Rising Battles! Victories vs Inferno! Transliteration: "Gachi Taiketsu! wbba. VS HELL!" (ガチ対決！wbba.VS HELL!)	January 31, 2020	July 11, 2020 (New Zealand); September 5, 2020 (United States)
At last, the curtains rise on the ultimate showdown between the Victories and Inferno! Dante and his team have seven rounds to prove their mettle. When Arthur steps up to Blade for Inferno, Arman will have to give it everything he's got to secure the first victory!
198	45	"Dragon's Ultimate Awakening!" / Dragon's Ultimate Awakening! Transliteration: "Doragon Kyūkyoku Kakusei!" (アポカリプス！ビックバンクラッシュ)	February 7, 2020	August 22, 2020 (New Zealand); September 12, 2020 (United States)
Arman and Ashindra may have been no match for Arthur, but the Victories aren't going to let one early loss lower their spirits. Dante's ready to battle Gwyn and his armored Eclipse Genesis. He's going to have to Blade harder than ever for the Victories to live up to their name!
199	46	"The Pitch Black Dread Gyro!" / Pitch Black! Dusk Gyro! Transliteration: "Shikkoku no Doreddo Jyairo!" (漆黒のドレットジャイロ！)	February 14, 2020	August 22, 2020 (New Zealand); September 12, 2020 (United States)
After Dragon's dramatic awakening, Delta steps up to take Blindt DeVoy down. But will Blindt's understanding of Delta's inner darkness lead to yet another Inferno victory? With Inferno in the lead, Delta will need to give it everything he's got if he's going to combat Blindt's new technique!
200	47	"A Seriously Intense Tag Battle!" / Rising Ferocity! Tag Battle! Transliteration: "Gachi geki! Taggu Batoru!" (ガチ激！タッグバトル!!)	February 21, 2020	August 29, 2020 (New Zealand); September 19, 2020 (United States); November 11, 2020 (Canada)
Fresh off the back of their first win, the Victories move on to the tag battle stage of their ultimate showdown against Team Inferno. After his previous defeat, Dante is hungry for a rematch against Gwyn. But who will fight by his side? Delta or Arman?
201	48	"The Strongest Equation" / The Flawless Equation! Transliteration: "Saikyō no hōteishiki" (最強の方程式!!)	February 28, 2020	August 29, 2020 (New Zealand); September 19, 2020 (United States)
This tag battle is far from over! Delta and Dante's combined efforts continue to defy Gwyn's calculations, but will it be enough to finally burst Genesis? And what about Apocalypse? The whole Blading world is on edge to find out which pair will claim victory!
202	49	"The Greatest Tag Battle!" / The Greatest Tag Battle Ever! Transliteration: "Saikkō no Taggu Batoru" (最ッ高のタッグバトル!!)	March 6, 2020	September 5, 2020 (New Zealand); September 26, 2020 (United States)
On the cusp of the final tag team battle, the Victories are only one point away from losing everything! Arman is sure that Dante and Delta are the best chance they have at winning. It's time they prove it by using their combined forces to take Inferno down!
203	50	"We Are the Victories!"; Transliteration: "Kore ga Bikutorīzu da!" (これがビクトリーズだ！)	March 13, 2020	September 5, 2020 (New Zealand); September 26, 2020 (United States)
As the battles heat up, Blading legends Valt and Aiger arrive to cheer the Victories on! Now it's time for Arman to redeem himself against Arthur in a one-on-one duel. The Victories stand behind Arman as he fights to end this so-called king's reign!
204	51	"A Serious Friendship! Master Dragon!" / Rising Friendship! Master Dragon! Transliteration: "Gachi Yūjō! Masutā Doragon!" (ガチ友情！マスタードラゴン!)	March 20, 2020	September 12, 2020 (New Zealand); October 3, 2020 (United States)
It all comes down to this! Team Inferno and Team Victories are now tied up heading into the final match. With the help of his teammates, Dante takes Dragon to the next level. But will it be enough to defeat the supposedly unburstable Eclipse Genesis once and for all!?
205	52	"It's Serious! Drum vs Gwyn!" / Rise Up! Dante vs Gwyn! Transliteration: "Gachinko! Doramu VS Guin!" (ガチンコ! ドラムVSグウィン!)	March 27, 2020	September 12, 2020 (New Zealand); October 3, 2020 (United States)
Dante and Gwyn's epic final battle comes to its inevitable conclusion. Already a point behind, Dante will need a Blading miracle if he hopes to burst Genesis. All eyes are on Dante as he rises up to try and win it all for the Blading World!
