= Beyblade Burst Surge =

- Season 5
- Key Visual
- No. of episodes: 52 (Japanese version); 26 (English version)

Release
- Original network: YouTube (CoroCoro, Takara Tomy); Tokyo MX
- Original release: October 5, 2020 – September 21, 2021

Season chronology
- ← Previous; Burst Rise Next → Burst QuadDrive

Beyblade Burst Surge, known in Japan as Beyblade Burst Sparking or Beyblade Burst Superking (ベイブレードバースト超王, Beiburēdo Bāsuto Supākingu), is a 2020 original net animation series and the fifth season of Beyblade Burst. The series was produced by ADK Emotions and animated by OLM, and it began streaming in Japan on the CoroCoro and Takara Tomy YouTube channels on April 3, 2020. On September 15, 2020, it was announced that the season would receive television broadcasting on Tokyo MX on October 5, 2020. An English dub of the anime premiered on Disney XD in the United States on February 20, 2021. It also broadcast on 9Go! in Australia. The Japanese opening theme is "Sparking Revolution" while the Japanese ending theme is an instrumental version of "Sparking Revolution". The English opening theme is "We Got the Spin" by Konrad OldMoney while the English ending theme is an instrumental of "We Got the Spin".

== Episode list ==
No. overall	No. in season	Japanese Translated title/English title	Directed by	Written by	Original release date	English air date
206	1	"Beyblade Revolution!!" / The Blading Revolution! (Part 1); Transliteration: "Beiburēdo Kakumei!!" (Japanese: ベイブレード革(かく)命(めい)！！)	Kentarō Yamaguchi; Ryōhei Horiuchi	Hideki Sonoda	October 5, 2020	February 20, 2021 (United States)
207	2	"Beys of the Sun! Hyperion and Helios!!" / The Blading Revolution! (Part 2); Transliteration: "Taiyō no Bei! Haiperion & Heriosu!!" (Japanese: 太(たい)陽(よう)のベイ！ ハイペリオン&ヘリオス！！)	Kentarō Yamaguchi; Ryōhei Horiuchi	Hideki Sonoda	October 5, 2020	February 20, 2021 (United States)
208	3	"Aiming for the Sparking Shoot!!" / Locked On! Lightning Launch! (Part 1); Transliteration: "Mezase Supākingu Shūto!!" (Japanese: めざせッ スパーキングシュート！！)	Yūki Morita	Daisuke Ishibashi	October 12, 2020	February 20, 2021 (United States)
209	4	"Knock Out Ragnaruk!!" / Locked On! Lightning Launch! (Part 2); Transliteration: "Ragunaruku o Buttobase!!" (Japanese: ラグナルクをぶっとばせ！！)	Hiroaki Kudō	Daisuke Ishibashi	October 19, 2020	February 20, 2021 (United States)
210	5	"Do It! King Strike!" / Persistence! Kolossal Strike! (Part 1); Transliteration: "Kimero Kingu Sutoraiku!" (Japanese: 決(き)めろッ キングストライク！)	Sotsu Terada	Yoshifumi Fukushima	October 26, 2020	February 27, 2021 (United States)
211	6	"Curse Satan's Challenge!" / Persistence! Kolossal Strike! (Part 2); Transliteration: "Chōsenda Kāsu Satan!" (Japanese: 挑(ちょう)戦(せん)だッ カースサタン！)	Sotsu Terada	Yoshifumi Fukushima	November 3, 2020	February 27, 2021 (United States)
212	7	"Hear the Voice in Your Bey!" / Listen to Your Bey's Voice! (Part 1); Transliteration: "Bei no Koe o Kikunda!" (Japanese: ベイの声(こえ)えを聞(き)くんだッ！)	Dai Fukuyama	Hideki Sonoda	November 10, 2020	March 6, 2021 (United States)
213	8	"Meet the Monster: Free De La Hoya!!" / Listen to Your Bey's Voice! (Part 2); Transliteration: "Furī de ra Hōya Tōjō!!" (Japanese: 怪物(フリー・デラホーヤ)登(とう)場(じょう)！！)	Takayuki Yamamoto	Hideki Sonoda	November 17, 2020	March 6, 2021 (United States)
214	9	"Phantom Dragon! Mirage Fafnir!!" / Illusory Dragon! Mirage Fafnir! (Part 1); Transliteration: "Genryū! Mirāji Fabuniru!!" (Japanese: 幻(げん)竜(りゅう)！ ミラージュファブニル！！)	Yūki Morita	Hideki Sonoda	November 24, 2020	March 13, 2021 (United States)
215	10	"Attack Not Good!? Attack Not Good!!" / Illusory Dragon! Mirage Fafnir! (Part 2); Transliteration: "Kōgeki Enujī!? Kōgeki Enujī!!" (Japanese: 攻(こう)撃(げき)NG！？攻(こう)撃(げき)NG！！)	Shigeki Awai	Yoshifumi Fukushima	December 1, 2020	March 13, 2021 (United States)
216	11	"Dream Tag Battle!!" / Dream Team! Tag Battle! (Part 1); Transliteration: "Yume no Taggu Batoru!!" (Japanese: 夢(ゆめ)のタッグバトル！！)	Sotsu Terada	Yoshifumi Fukushima	December 7, 2020	March 20, 2021 (United States)
217	12	"Shirasagijo x Onigashima!" / Dream Team! Tag Battle! (Part 2); Transliteration: "Shirasagijō x Onigashima!" (Japanese: 白(しら)鷺(さぎ)城(じょう)×鬼(おに)ヶ(が)島(しま)！)	Sotsu Terada	Daisuke Ishibashi	December 14, 2020	March 20, 2021 (United States)
218	13	"Conquer the Demon Dungeon!!" / Conquering the Ogre's Dungeon! (Part 1); Transliteration: "Koryakuseyo Oni Danjon!!" (Japanese: 攻(こう)略(りゃく)せよッ 鬼(おに)ダンジョン！！)	Dai Fukuyama	Daisuke Ishibashi	December 21, 2020	March 27, 2021 (United States)
219	14	"Fierce Storm! Rage Longinus!!" / Conquering the Ogre's Dungeon! (Part 2); Transliteration: "Gekiran! Reiji Ronginusu!!" (Japanese: 激(げき)嵐(らん)！ レイジロンギヌス！！)	Takayuki Yamamoto	Hideki Sonoda	December 28, 2020	March 27, 2021 (United States)
220	15	"The Jet Black Sun! Variant Lucifer!!" / The Jet-Black Sun! Vex Lucius! (Part 1); Transliteration: "Shikkoku no Taiyō! Barianto Rushifā!!" (Japanese: 漆(しっ)黒(こく)の太(たい)陽(よう)！ バリアントルシファー！！)	Daisuke Chiba	Hideki Sonoda	January 5, 2021	April 3, 2021 (United States)
221	16	"Barrier! Variant Wall!!" / The Jet-Black Sun! Vex Lucius! (Part 2); Transliteration: "Kekkai! Barianto Uōru!!" (Japanese: 結(けっ)界(かい)！ バリアントウォール！！)	Hiroaki Kudō	Hideki Sonoda	January 12, 2021	April 3, 2021 (United States)
222	17	"Heaven!? Hell!!" / Is This a Dream?! Or Is It a Nightmare?! (Part 1); Transliteration: "Tengoku!? Jigoku!!" (Japanese: 天(てん)国(ごく)！？地(じ)獄(ごく)！！)	Sotsu Terada	Yoshifumi Fukushima	January 19, 2021	April 10, 2021 (United States)
223	18	"GT is Here!!" / Is This a Dream?! Or Is It a Nightmare?! (Part 2); Transliteration: "Gachi ga Kita!!" (Japanese: ガチが来(き)たッ！！)	Sotsu Terada	Yoshifumi Fukushima	January 26, 2021	April 10, 2021 (United States)
224	19	"The Stormy Dragon! Tempest Dragon!!" / Rise to Victory! Triumph Dragon! (Part 1); Transliteration: "Ranryū! Tenpesuto Doragon!!" (Japanese: 嵐(らん)竜(りゅう)！ テンペストドラゴン！！)	Takayuki Yamamoto	Daisuke Ishibashi	February 2, 2021	April 17, 2021 (United States)
225	20	"Flare of Tyranny: Lean!!" / Rise to Victory! Triumph Dragon! (Part 2); Transliteration: "Bōgyaku no Furea Rēn!!" (Japanese: 暴(ぼう)虐(ぎゃく)の炎(フレア) レーン！！)	Takayuki Yamamoto	Daisuke Ishibashi	February 9, 2021	April 17, 2021 (United States)
226	21	"The Great Revolution!! Legend Festival!!" / The Great Revolution! Legend Festival! (Part 1); Transliteration: "Kakumei Gekishin!! Rejendo Fesutibaru!!" (Japanese: 革(かく)命(めい)激(げき)震(しん)！！ レジェンドフェスティバル！！)	Shigeki Awai	Hideki Sonoda	February 16, 2021	April 24, 2021 (United States)
227	22	"Super Z! Infinite Achilles!!" / The Great Revolution! Legend Festival! (Part 2); Transliteration: "Chō Zetsu! Infinitto Akiresu!!" (Japanese: 超(ちょう)ゼツ！ インフィニットアキレス！！)	Park Chi Man; Sung Won Yong	Hideki Sonoda	February 23, 2021	April 24, 2021 (United States)
228	23	"Hyuga & Lean vs. Hikaru & Aiga!!" / Hyuga and Lain vs. Hikaru and Aiger! (Part 1); Transliteration: "Hyūga & Rēn Bāsasu Hikaru & Aiga!!" (Japanese: ヒュウガ&レーン VS(バーサス) ヒカル&アイガ！！)	Sotsu Terada	Yoshifumi Fukushima	March 2, 2021	May 1, 2021 (United States)
229	24	"A God Battle of Friendship!" / Hyuga and Lain vs. Hikaru and Aiger! (Part 2); Transliteration: "Yūjō no Goddo Batoru!" (Japanese: 友(ゆう)情(じょう)の神(ゴッド)バトル！)	Sotsu Terada	Yoshifumi Fukushima	March 6, 2021	May 1, 2021 (United States)
230	25	"A Tag Battle Among Men!" / A True Hero! Tag Battle Style! (Part 1); Transliteration: "Otoko no Taggu Batoru!" (Japanese: 漢(おとこ)のタッグバトル！)	Hanako Ueda	Daisuke Ishibashi	March 13, 2021	April 26, 2021 (Australia); July 10, 2021 (United States)
231	26	"GT vs. Super Z!!" / A True Hero! Tag Battle Style! (Part 2); Transliteration: "Gachi tai Chō Zetsu!!" (Japanese: ガチVS超(ちょう)ゼツ！！)	Haru Shinomiya	Daisuke Ishibashi	March 20, 2021	April 26, 2021 (Australia); July 10, 2021 (United States)
232	27	"Win and Go Forth, Zoom Zoom Zoom!" / Gotta Win! Going All-Out! (Part 1); Transliteration: "Kachinuke Gyugyugyūn!" (Japanese: 勝ち抜けッ ギュギュギューン！)	Naoki Hishikawa	Hideki Sonoda	March 27, 2021	April 27, 2021 (Australia); July 17, 2021 (United States)
233	28	"Strongest and Unbeatable vs. the New Generation!!" / Gotta Win! Going All-Out! (Part 2); Transliteration: "Saikyō Muteki Bāsasu Shin Sedai!!" (Japanese: 最(さい)強(きょう)無(む)敵(てき) VS(バーサス) 新(しん)世(せ)代(だい)！！)	Naoki Hishikawa	Yoshifumi Fukushima	April 4, 2021	April 27, 2021 (Australia); July 17, 2021 (United States)
234	29	"Defeat Valt!!" / Defeat Valt! (Part 1); Transliteration: "Baruto o Taose!!" (Japanese: バルトを倒(たお)せ！！)	Sotsu Terada	Yoshifumi Fukushima	April 11, 2021	May 3, 2021 (Australia); July 24, 2021 (United States)
235	30	"Explosive Battle!!" / Defeat Valt! (Part 2); Transliteration: "Bakuen no Batoru!!" (Japanese: 爆(ばく)炎(えん)の死闘(バトル)！！)	Sotsu Terada	Hideki Sonoda	April 18, 2021	May 3, 2021 (Australia); July 24, 2021 (United States)
236	31	"Finals! Valt vs. Lean!!" / Grand Finale! Valt vs. Lain! (Part 1); Transliteration: "Kesshō! Baruto Bāsasu Rēn!!" (Japanese: 決(けっ)勝(しょう)！ バルトVSレーン！！)	Dai Fukuyama	Daisuke Ishibashi	April 25, 2021	May 4, 2021 (Australia); July 31, 2021 (United States)
237	32	"Limit Break! Hyperion & Helios!!" / Grand Finale! Valt vs. Lain! (Part 2); Transliteration: "Rimitto Bureiku! Haiperion & Heriosu!!" (Japanese: 限界突破(リミットブレイク)！ ハイペリオン&ヘリオス！！)	Takayuki Yamamoto	Hideki Sonoda	May 2, 2021	May 4, 2021 (Australia); July 31, 2021 (United States)
238	33	"The Fierce Crimson God! World Spriggan!!" / Spirit of Fire! World Spryzen! (Part 1); Transliteration: "Guren no Kishin! Wārudo Supurigan!!" (Japanese: 紅(ぐ)蓮(れん)の鬼(き)神(しん)！ ワールドスプリガン！！)	Yūki Morita	Hideki Sonoda	May 8, 2021	May 10, 2021 (Australia); August 7, 2021 (United States)
239	34	"Tag Showdown! Valt & Shu!!" / Spirit of Fire! World Spryzen (Part 2); Transliteration: "Taggu Taiketsu! Baruto & Shū!!" (Japanese: タッグ対(たい)決(けつ)！ バルト&シュウ！！)	Naoki Hishikawa	Yoshifumi Fukushima	May 15, 2021	May 10, 2021 (Australia); August 7, 2021 (United States)
240	35	"Lucifer the End's Counterattack!!" / Counterattack! Lucius Endbringer! (Part 1); Transliteration: "Gyakushū no Rushifā Jiendo!!" (Japanese: 逆(ぎゃく)襲(しゅう)のルシファージエンド！！)	Sotsu Terada	Daisuke Ishibashi	May 22, 2021	May 11, 2021 (Australia); August 14, 2021 (United States)
241	36	"Cyber! Beyblade Virtual!!" / Counterattack! Lucius Endbringer! (Part 2); Transliteration: "Den'nō! Beiburēdo Bācharu!!" (Japanese: 電(でん)脳(のう)！ ベイブレードバーチャル！！)	Sotsu Terada	Daisuke Ishibashi	May 29, 2021	May 11, 2021 (Australia); August 14, 2021 (United States)
242	37	"The Best Tag Partner!!" / Tag-Team! Ultimate Partner! (Part 1); Transliteration: "Saikō no Taggu Pātonā!!" (Japanese: 最(さい)高(こう)のタッグパートナー！！)	Dai Fukuyama	Hideki Sonoda	June 6, 2021	May 17, 2021 (Australia); August 21, 2021 (United States)
243	38	"It Begins! Legend Super Tag League!!" / Tag-Team! Ultimate Partner! (Part 2); Transliteration: "Kaimaku! Rejendo Sūpā Taggu Rīgu!!" (Japanese: 開(かい)幕(まく)！ レジェンドスーパータッグリーグ！！)	Shigeki Awai	Daisuke Ishibashi	June 13, 2021	May 17, 2021 (Australia); August 21, 2021 (United States)
244	39	"Strategy! Ultimate Storm!!" / Raging Battle! Defeating the Storm! (Part 1); Transliteration: "Kōryaku! Arutimetto Sutōmu!!" (Japanese: 攻(こう)略(りゃく)！ アルティメットストーム！！)	Daisuke Chiba	Yoshifumi Fukushima	June 20, 2021	May 18, 2021 (Australia); August 28, 2021 (United States)
245	40	"Crash! Everyone's Bonds!!" / Raging Battle! Defeating the Storm! (Part 2); Transliteration: "Shōtotsu! Sorezore no Kizuna!!" (Japanese: 衝(しょう)突(とつ)！ それぞれの絆(きずな)！！)	Naoki Hishikawa	Yoshifumi Fukushima	June 27, 2021	May 18, 2021 (Australia); August 28, 2021 (United States)
246	41	"The Climactic Legend Battle!" / Crash and Clash! Battle of Legends! (Part 1); Transliteration: "Hakunetsu no Rejendo Batoru!" (Japanese: 白(はく)熱(ねつ)のレジェンドバトル！)	Sotsu Terada	Hideki Sonoda	July 3, 2021	August 2, 2021 (Australia); September 4, 2021 (United States)
247	42	"Burn Flare! Spark!!" / Crash and Clash! Battle of Legends! (Part 2); Transliteration: "Moyase Furea! Pitā!!" (Japanese: 燃(も)やせ炎(フレア)！ ピターーッ！！)	Sotsu Terada	Hideki Sonoda	July 10, 2021	August 2, 2021 (Australia); September 4, 2021 (United States)
248	43	"Friendly Fire!? Limit Break the End!!" / Friendly Fire? Final Limit Breaker! (Part 1); Transliteration: "Dōshi Uchi!? Rimitto Bureiku Jiendo!!" (Japanese: 同(どう)士(し)討(う)ち(ち)！？ リミットブレイクジエンド！！)	Dai Fukuyama	Hideki Sonoda	July 17, 2021	August 3, 2021 (Australia); September 11, 2021 (United States)
249	44	"Next-Level Training! Jet Wyvern!!" / Friendly Fire? Final Limit Breaker! (Part 2); Transliteration: "Genkai Tokkun! Jetto Waibān!!" (Japanese: 限(げん)界(かい)特(とっ)訓(くん)！ ジェットワイバーン！！)	Akira Mano	Yoshifumi Fukushima	July 24, 2021	August 3, 2021 (Australia); September 11, 2021 (United States)
250	45	"Burning! Manly! Serious Battle!" / Scorching Battle! Dauntless Bravery! (Part 1); Transliteration: "Shakunetsu! Otokogi! Gachi Batoru!" (Japanese: 灼(しゃく)熱(ねつ)！漢(おと)気(こぎ)！ガチバトル！)	Yūki Morita	Daisuke Ishibashi	July 31, 2021	August 9, 2021 (Australia); September 18, 2021 (United States)
251	46	"Mad Storm! Raging Tempest!!" / Scorching Battle! Dauntless Bravery! (Part 2); Transliteration: "Kyōran! Reijingu Tenpesuto!!" (Japanese: 狂(きょう)嵐(らん)！ レイジングテンペスト！！)	Daisuke Chiba	Daisuke Ishibashi	August 7, 2021	August 9, 2021 (Australia); September 18, 2021 (United States)
252	47	"No Spark!!" / We Can Do It! Or Maybe Not! (Part 1); Transliteration: "Pitā ga Dekinai!!" (Japanese: ピターーッができない！！)	Naoki Hishikawa	Yoshifumi Fukushima	August 14, 2021	August 10, 2021 (Australia); September 25, 2021 (United States)
253	48	"The Bonds of Beys!!" / We Can Do It! Or Maybe Not! (Part 2); Transliteration: "Bei no Kizuna!!" (Japanese: ベイの絆(きずな)！！)	Haru Shinomiya	Hideki Sonoda	August 21, 2021	August 10, 2021 (Australia); September 25, 2021 (United States)
254	49	"Confident! Timid? Carefree!?" / Confidence! Cowardice? Carefree-ness?! (Part 1); Transliteration: "Tsuyoki! Yowaki? Nōtenki!?" (Japanese: 強(つよ)気(き)！弱(よわ)気(き)？ノー天(てん)気(き)！？)	Sotsu Terada	Daisuke Ishibashi	August 28, 2021	August 16, 2021 (Australia); October 2, 2021 (United States)
255	50	"Cross Over! The Legendary Wall!!" / Confidence! Cowardice? Carefree-ness?! (Part 2); Transliteration: "Koero! Rejendo no Kabe!!" (Japanese: 超(こ)えろ！ レジェンドの壁(かべ)！！)	Sotsu Terada	Daisuke Ishibashi	September 7, 2021	August 16, 2021 (Australia); October 2, 2021 (United States)
256	51	"Revolution! Final Battle!!" / Revolution! The Final Showdown! (Part 1); Transliteration: "Kakumei da! Saishū Kessen!!" (Japanese: 革(かく)命(めい)だ！最(さい)終(しゅう)決(けっ)戦(せん)！！)	Naoki Hishikawa	Hideki Sonoda	September 17, 2021	August 17, 2021 (Australia); October 9, 2021 (United States)
257	52	"Break Through the Limits! Our Flare!!" / Revolution! The Final Showdown! (Part 2); Transliteration: "Genkai Toppa! Oretachi no Furea!!" (Japanese: 限(げん)界(かい)突(とっ)破(ぱ)！俺(おれ)たちの太陽(フレア)！！)	Hanako Ueda	Hideki Sonoda	September 21, 2021	August 17, 2021 (Australia); October 9, 2021 (United States)
