= Metal Fight Beyblade vs the Sun: Sol Blaze, the Scorching Hot Invader =

- Film Poster

Japanese name
- Kanji: 劇場版メタルファイト ベイブレードVS太陽 灼熱の侵略者ソルブレイズ
- Literal meaning: Beyblade: Sol Blaze, the Scorching-hot Invader
Transcriptions
- Revised Hepburn: Metaru Faito Beibureedo VS Taiyō Shakunetsu no Shinryakusha Soru Bureizu
- Directed by: Kunihisa Sugishima
- Written by: Katsumi Hasegawa
- Music by: Scott Bucsis
- Production companies: SynergySP; Tatsunoko Production; d-rights; Shogakukan; Takara Tomy; Hudson Soft; Toho; TV Tokyo; ShoPro; AT-X
- Distributed by: Toho
- Release date: 21 August 2010
- Running time: 75 minutes
- Country: Japan
- Language: Japanese
- Box office: $5,737,369 (as a double billing with Duel Masters: Honō no Kizuna XX)

Metal Fight Beyblade vs the Sun: Sol Blaze, the Scorching Hot Invader (劇場版メタルファイト ベイブレードVS太陽 灼熱の侵略者ソルブレイズ, Metaru Faito Beibureedo VS Taiyō Shakunetsu no Shinryakusha Soru Bureizu) is a Beyblade film based on the anime Beyblade: Metal Masters. It is the second Beyblade film.

== Plot ==
A meteorite from space named Adonis is seen heading at Earth. Extreme weather starts to develop all around the world from harsh winds to volcanoes erupting.

Meanwhile, men on a ship are sailing on the ocean to their destination. It's summertime for Ginga and his friends as they play at the beach. Benkei wants food and starts to choke and drinks a beverage from Kenta but spits it out. Ginga, Masamune, and Benkei swim while Tsubasa just sits peacefully on the beach. Kenta and Yu make sandcastles, Hyoma and Hokuto sit on the beach while Madoka just sits on her beach chair relaxing on the beach in delight. The men on the ship sail to some urban ruins. One man uses his Bey, Dark Poseidon to unlock a Bey. The Bey, Sol Blaze is then given to the man's grandson, Helios. Helios uses Sol Blaze's power to create disastrous weather outside. Bakin, Helios' grandfather tells Helios that Helios needs to battle against the full power of Pegasis to rebuild Atlantis.

Ginga and his friends have now exited the beach and are in a Beyblade tournament. Ginga and Kenta battle with Ginga winning. Then, Masamune and Benkei battle with Masamune winning. Ginga and Tsubasa go head-to-head. The battle is fierce but, in the end, it is Ginga who emerges victorious. Just then, a shield starts to cover the top of the stadium and smoke appears. People cough when Yu and other Bladers are found lying on the floor. Ginga and the others rush to his rescue when Helios emerges from the smoke and reveals himself to them. Helios states that he caused this and wants to battle Ginga. Ginga accepts, swearing to defeat him for what he's done. Ginga's Galaxy Pegasis battles Helios' Sol Blaze. Sol Blaze hits Pegasis repeatedly getting Ginga in jeopardy. Helios is testing Pegasis' power. Madoka uses her computer and finds out that Sol Blaze is an Attack-Type that can change its Track to become a Defense-Type Bey. This is bad news for Ginga as it seems Ginga will lose this battle. Helios uses a special move that defeats Pegasis by breaking it; Helios is the winner. Ginga is shocked at how he lost while his friends come to support him and launch their Beys at Sol Blaze. None of them are able to deliver a direct hit at Sol Blaze. Helios attacks them and sends them flying. Helios tells Ginga that he will battle Ginga again and use its power to rebuild Atlantis. Everyone is surprised to hear about the lost city of Atlantis that was destroyed overnight. Helios takes his Bey with him and leaves. At the B-Pit, Ginga and Madoka talk about Ginga's loss. Ginga sees Sol Blaze as a very powerful Bey and needs to be able to defeat Helios once and for all. Masamune, Kenta, and Benkei barge in to talk to Ginga. Benkei gets on top of Masamune and Masamune bites him, hurting Benkei's arm. Ginga gets angry at Masamune for doing that and they start arguing. Madoka yells at them both to stop fighting. Masamune gets angry and runs away from the B-Pit.

Helios and his grandfather talk about Ginga. Helios sees him as a strong opponent but not strong enough and Helios is determined to defeat Ginga.

Tetsuya and Tobio look at the Helios' clan and Tobio fires his Bey at a camera in the clan's headquarters. Later, Tetsuya finds Ryutaro and tells him to follow him. Masamune runs through the city in anger. He finally reaches to the top of a building and rests; lies down crying. He is spotted by Ryutaro and Tetsuya. Helios appears before them and challenges them to a Beybattle. The Beys are no match for Helios' Sol Blaze and are unwittingly defeated. Tsubasa is in the ark where he sees many Earth's things. Tsubasa was shocked when he sees a machine u-like something.

In B-Pit, as Kenta, Benkei and Yu enters the shop, they found Masamune go back home, suffering an injury while brought a wounded Ryutaro. Masamune tells them that Sol Blaze is stronger than the group thought, and collapses before he can reach Kenta and the others. Ginga, enraged by this, is about to storm off to fight Helios, but Masamune tells him only the water symbol can beat Sol Blaze. From the WBBA headquarters, Ryusei tells Ginga that Sol Blaze is the Orihalcon bey that destroyed Atlantis in the first place. Then, Ginga begins the trip to stop Sol Blaze, joined by Benkei, Masamune, Kenta, Madoka and Yu. They arrive in there by riding a helicopter. Then, Ginga convinces Helios to stop the rise of Atlantis, but Helios declines. Ginga tells him that Sol Blaze is the dangerous Orihalcon bey and Helios was convinced at first, but Bakin makes him declines once more. Then, Bakin commands Helios to crush them. Ginga was enraged a little, but Masamune says whatever you say, it will be useless. Then Masamune recklessly launches Ray Unicorno, but Helios defeats him with ease. Even he continues to attack Ray Unicorno. In order to stop Helios from attacking Ray Unicorno, Benkei, Kenta and Yu launch their beys. This doesn't help much as Helios uses his special move, Blaze Execution, thus almost burning Dark Bull, Flame Sagittario, Flame Libra and Ray Unicorno. Kenta begs Helios to stop. Then they were saved by Ginga who challenges Helios to a battle. Helios and Ginga start the battle. Ginga is seen stronger than before. Both bladers use their full power and command their special moves. Ginga uses his special move Galaxy Nova to defeat Sol Blaze. Helios is disappointed, but Bakin tells him that he did very well. Bakin says that he only needed Pegasis and Blaze to battle with their full power and the result didn't matter. Then Bakin explains his complete plan. His plan was to use Pegasis and Blaze's power to drop Adonis on Earth which would destroy all civilizations on Earth. Then he would rebuild Atlantis on it. Everyone including Helios was surprised to hear Bakin's plans. Helios is completely stunned to understand that what he believed throughout his life was not true. Ginga and co. tried to stop Helios' grandfather but they get surrounded by Bakin's bladers. Helios decides to stop his grandfather's evil intentions. He uses Sol Blaze to take out Bakin's bladers. Ginga and Helios respectively launch Galaxy Pegasis and Sol Blaze to fight against Bakin's bey Dark Poseidon. While Dark Poseidon was fighting against Galaxy Pegasis and Sol Blaze, Kyoya's Rock Leone appear out of nowhere. Kyoya tells Ginga and Helios to go to space and destroy Adonis. Kyoya's Rock Leone defeats Dark Poseidon. Meanwhile, Ginga and Helios take a rocket to space. With the power of Pegasis and Blaze, Ginga and Helios destroy Adonis and save the Earth.

== Cast ==
Character	Voice actor
Ginga Hagane	Aki Kanada
Kyoya Tategami	Satoshi Hino
Helios	Tomoaki Maeno
Bakin	Tesshō Genda
Kenta Yumiya	Emiri Katō
Madoka Amano	Kei Shindou
Benkei Hanawa	Kenta Miyake
Masamune Kadoya	Yuko Sanpei
Hokuto	Hozumi Gōda
Yu Tendo	Kaori Nazuka
Tsubasa Otori	Miyu Irino
Ryusei Hagane	Sho Hayami
Hyoma	Tetsuya Kakihara
Hikaru Hasama	Marina Inoue
Tetsuya Watarigani	Ken'ichi Fujiwara
Ryutaro Fukami	Hiro Yuuki
Tobio Oike	Akira Ishida
Teru Saotome	Nobuhiko Okamoto

== Release ==
=== Marketing ===
Prior to its release and to promote the film, anyone pre-ordering a ticket to the film would receive a "limited edition" Sol Blaze V145AS with a permanently red painted metal-wheel.

=== Box office ===
In its opening week the film was billed with Duel Masters The Movie 2010, and both stayed at #5 at the box office for two consecutive weeks. However, it soon dropped to #9, taking an amount equal to $959,943. The film made $5,737,369 by the end of its run in cinemas on the third week of October 2010.

=== DVD release ===
Its DVD Release was made on 18 February 2011.

=== International broadcast ===
This film aired in India in Hindi, Tamil and Telugu dub on Marvel HQ on July 31, 2021. The film was released in France on August 15, 2018.
