= Beyblade (disambiguation) =

Beyblade is a line of spinning-top toys.

Beyblade may also refer to:

== Franchise ==
- Beyblade (franchise), a Japanese media franchise that consists of toys, manga, anime television series and films

== Entertainment ==
- Beyblade (manga), a manga and anime series to promote toys
- Beyblade: Metal Fusion, a second manga and anime series
  - Beyblade: Shogun Steel, a sequel manga and anime series of Beyblade: Metal Fusion
  - BeyWheelz, a spin-off anime series of Beyblade: Metal Fusion
    - BeyWarriors: BeyRaiderz, a spin-off of Beyblade franchise and sequel anime series of BeyWheelz
- BeyWarriors: Cyborg, a spin-off anime series of Beyblade franchise
- Beyblade Burst, a third manga and anime series of franchise
- Beyblade X, a fourth manga and anime series of franchise

== Fictional character ==
- List of Beyblade characters
- List of Beyblade: Metal Fusion characters
