= Beyblade Burst =

Japanese manga series

- First tankōbon volume cover, featuring Valt Aoi (right), and Shu Kurenai (left)

ベイブレードバースト (Beiburēdo Bāsuto)
- Manga
- Written by: Hiro Morita
- Published by: Shogakukan
- Imprint: Coro Coro Comics
- Magazine: CoroCoro Comic
- Original run: August 2015 – December 15, 2021
- Volumes: 20
- Anime television series

Beyblade Burst
- Directed by: Katsuhito Akiyama; Kentaro Yamaguchi (assistant); Jin-Koo Oh (assistant's assistant)
- Written by: Hideki Sonoda
- Music by: Yusaku Tsuchiya
- Studio: OLM Team Abe
- Licensed by: AUS: The Fusion Agency; NA: ADK Emotions NY, Inc.
- Original network: TXN (TV Tokyo)
- English network: AU: 9Go!; AUS: Disney Channel; BI: Kix (Note: until episode 48); CA: Teletoon; NZ: TVNZ; SEA: Disney Channel, Disney XD; US: Disney XD
- Original run: April 4, 2016 – March 27, 2017
- Episodes: 51
- Video game
- Developer: FuRyu
- Publisher: FuRyu
- Platform: Nintendo 3DS
- Released: JP: November 10, 2016
Further information
Anime television series
Beyblade Burst Evolution
Directed by	Katsuhito Akiyama (chief); Kentaro Yamaguchi; Jin-Koo Oh (assistant)
Written by	Hideki Sonoda
Music by	Zain Effendi
Studio	OLM Team Abe
Licensed by	AUS: The Fusion Agency; NA: ADK Emotions NY, Inc.
Original network	TXN (TV Tokyo)
English network	AU: 9Go!; CA: Teletoon, Disney XD; SEA: Disney Channel, Disney XD; US: Disney XD
Original run	April 3, 2017 – March 26, 2018
Episodes	51
Video game
Beyblade Burst God
Developer	FuRyu
Publisher	FuRyu
Platform	Nintendo 3DS
Released	JP: November 23, 2017
Anime television series
Beyblade Burst Turbo
Directed by	Katsuhito Akiyama (chief); Kentaro Yamaguchi; Jin-Koo Oh (assistant)
Written by	Hideki Sonoda
Music by	Danny Jacob
Studio	OLM Team Abe
Licensed by	AUS: The Fusion Agency; NA: ADK Emotions NY, Inc.
Original network	TXN (TV Tokyo)
English network	AU: 9Go!; CA: Teletoon; IN: Marvel HQ; SEA: Disney XD, Disney Channel; US: Disney XD
Original run	April 2, 2018 – March 25, 2019
Episodes	51
Video game
Beyblade Burst Battle Zero
Developer	FuRyu
Publisher	FuRyu
Platform	Nintendo Switch
Released	JP: October 25, 2018
Original net animation
Beyblade Burst Rise
Directed by	Katsuhito Akiyama (chief); Jin-Koo Oh
Written by	Hideki Sonoda
Music by	Roy Shakked
Studio	OLM Team Abe
Licensed by	AUS: The Fusion Agency; NA: ADK Emotions NY, Inc.
English network	AU: 9Go!; CA: Teletoon; SEA: Disney Channel; US: Disney XD
Released	April 5, 2019 – March 27, 2020
Episodes	52
Original net animation
Beyblade Burst Surge
Directed by	Katsuhito Akiyama (chief); Jin-Koo Oh
Written by	Hideki Sonoda
Music by	Roy Shakked; Todd Bryanton
Studio	OLM Team Abe
Licensed by	AUS: The Fusion Agency; NA: ADK Emotions NY, Inc.
Original network	Tokyo MX
English network	AU: 9Go!; CA: Teletoon; IN: Disney Channel; SEA: Disney Channel; US: Disney XD
Released	April 3, 2020 – March 19, 2021
Episodes	52
Original net animation
Beyblade Burst QuadDrive
Directed by	Katsuhito Akiyama (chief); Jin-Koo Oh; Moto Terada (assistant)
Written by	Hideki Sonoda
Music by	Frederik Wiedmann
Studio	OLM Team Masuda
Licensed by	AUS: The Fusion Agency; NA: ADK Emotions NY, Inc.
English network	AU: 9Go!; CA: Teletoon; MY: TA-DAA!; US: Disney XD
Released	April 2, 2021 – March 18, 2022
Episodes	52
Anime television series
Beyblade Burst QuadStrike
Directed by	Katsuhito Akiyama (chief); Jin-Koo Oh; Moto Terada (assistant)
Written by	Hideki Sonoda
Music by	Frederik Wiedmann
Studio	OLM Team Masuda
Licensed by	AUS: The Fusion Agency; NA: ADK Emotions NY, Inc.
English network	CA: Cartoon Network; US: Disney XD
Original run	April 3, 2023 – December 2, 2023
Episodes	26
- Related manga
- Beyblade; Metal Fight Beyblade; Metal Fight Beyblade Zero-G; Beyblade X
- Related anime
- Beyblade; Beyblade: Metal Fusion; BeyWheelz; BeyWarriors: BeyRaiderz; BeyWarriors: Cyborg; Beyblade X

Beyblade Burst (Japanese: ベイブレードバースト, Hepburn: Beiburēdo Bāsuto) is a Japanese manga and toyline created by Hiro Morita, based on Takara Tomy's Beyblade franchise. The third series of the franchise, the Beyblade Burst toyline launched on July 15, 2015, while the original manga was serialized in Shogakukan's children's manga magazine CoroCoro Comic from August 2015 to December 2021 and is compiled into twenty tankōbon volumes. Shogakukan's South East Asian branch began publishing it in English in April of 2017.

An anime adaptation by OLM premiered on all TXN stations in Japan on April 4, 2016. ADK Emotions NY, Inc. licensed the anime and Hasbro licensed the toyline in English; marking the first time in the franchise that an English adaptation wasn't produced by Nelvana. The first two series were originally recorded between Vancouver, British Columbia and Calgary, Alberta in Canada by Ocean Productions and its sister studio Blue Water. Since the third series; the franchise has been recorded in Los Angeles, California in the United States by Bang Zoom! Entertainment. The dub would be one of the final anime voice acting roles of Gabe Khouth who died two years later.

== Plot ==
=== Beyblade Burst (2016–17) ===
The story revolves around Valt Aoi and his childhood best friend Shu Kurenai, as well as their classmates at the Beigoma Academy school in Japan. Beyond their academic studies, they both share an intense passion for Bey tops, creating a school bey club and challenging one another to battles at their Bey Stadium. As time passes, the friends eventually become rivals as they compete against each other in a competition to claim the title of No.1 Blader in Japan, in the Japan National Tournament Finals, Valt lost to the reigning Japan National Champion Lui Shirosagi.

=== Beyblade Burst Evolution (2017–18) ===
Valt Aoi, who was a top competitor in the Japan National Tournament, is scouted for the prestigious Spanish team "BC Sol" and heads out to Spain. When he arrives in Spain, he runs into some old friends and meets some new ones who end up accompanying him on his journey. Valt's first battle in Spain leaves his bey, Victory Valtryek, with an opportunity to evolve into Genesis Valtryek, making it stronger. Valt and his friends set their sights on becoming No.1 Blader in the world; however, to qualify for the World League, they must first take the European League by winning team battles against other teams from around the globe. After the victory of BC Sol in the World League, Valt competes in the International Bladers's Cup and manages to defeat Shu Kurenai in the finals to become World Champion.

=== Beyblade Burst Turbo (2018–19) ===
Two years after Valt Aoi's victory in the International Blader's Cup, the story focuses on Aiger Akabane, a "wild child" that grew up in nature. After battling and losing to World Champion Valt and Wonder Valtryek, he became inspired to become strongest Blader in the world, along with his Turbo Bey, Z Achilles. He aims to fight stronger opponents in an effort to become stronger himself. To defeat Valt and become new World Champion, Aiger begins his journey.

=== Beyblade Burst Rise (2019–2020) ===
Valt Aoi has been training the next generation of elite Bladers in Spain's BC Sol. One day, rookie Bladers Dante Koryu and Delta Zakuro witness Valt unleashing his Gamma Bey, Sword Valtryek. To their surprise, Valtryek radiates a golden light as it rockets around the stadium. Inspired by the limitless possibilities of this "Hyper-Flux" state, both Dante and Delta seek the same bond with their Beys. Dante and his Gamma Bey partner, Ace Dragon, set off for Japan, the birthplace of Beyblade. But the path to glory won't be easy; plenty of tough competitors and Gamma Beys stand in their way, among them some of the best to ever let it rip. Dante soon realizes he'll have to do whatever it takes to deepen his bond with Dragon.

=== Beyblade Burst Surge (2020–21) ===
The Blading Legends, a select group of Bladers who set the standard to which all others aspire, are considered the best of the Blading World. No challenger has succeeded in breaking into their ranks.

The No.1 Legendary Blader of Blading Legends in the world, Valt Aoi hosts an exhibition match featuring a revolutionary class of Bey: "Lightning Beys". Inspired by the battle, the Hizashi brothers Hikaru and Hyuga issue a challenge: armed with their Lightning Beys, Super Hyperion and Kolossal Helios, this unlikely duo is going to topple Beyblade's ruling elite.

As the Hizashi brothers challenge the Blading Legends, a tournament is organized to determine the strongest among them. A mysterious Blader then appears.

=== Beyblade Burst QuadDrive (2021–22) ===
The story centers on Bel Daizora, the leader of the Bey Graveyard "Phantom's Gate". Bel, who holds Quad Bey Destruction Belfyre, declares war on Bladers and the Blading Legends across the world. With Ranzo Kiyama and Bashara Suiro, their journey unfolds as Bel advances to becoming the Dark Prince.

=== Beyblade Burst QuadStrike (2023) ===
The stage is set for a Grand Masquerade Bey Tournament, but the Dark Prince isn't the only belle at this ball. Enter: the masked Blader known as Quadra. Wielding her Elemental Bey, Lightning Pandora, Quadra has defeated every foe and including the Dark Prince to come her way. Meanwhile, Quadra's older brother, Pax Forsythe, is busy studying the elemental powers radiating from a series of mysterious ruins nearby. Bel Daizora might be the Dark Prince, but this adventure is full of even darker secrets.

== Characters ==
Valt Aoi / Baruto Aoi (蒼井 バルト, Aoi Baruto)
Voiced by: Marina Inoue (Japanese); Sabrina Pitre (seasons 1-2), Kimlinh Tran (seasons 3-7) (English)
The main protagonist of Burst and Burst Evolution series. An enthusiastic-11-year old boy who dreams to become the No.1 Blader in the world. Original captain and founder of Beigoma Academy BeyClub and captain of the Beyblade Team called BC Sol represents Spain.
Shu Kurenai (紅 シュウ, Kurenai Shū) / Red Eye (レッドアイ, Reddo Ai)
Voiced by: Junya Enoki (Japanese); Adrian Petriw (seasons 1-2), Alan Lee (seasons 3, 5-7) (English)
Valt's childhood best friend and main rival. He is a member of Beigoma Academy BeyClub, also one of the Supreme Four and the owner of the Beyblade Team called Raging Bulls represents America.
Rantaro Kiyama (黄山 乱太郎, Kiyama Rantarō)
Voiced by: Fumihiro Okabayashi (Japanese); Matt Hill (seasons 1-2), Kevin K. Gomez (season 5) (English)
Also known as The Head Honcho or Honcho / The Boss (クミチョー, Kumicho). Rantaro is a member of Beigoma Academy BeyClub and BC Sol as well as a coach for The Bombers. He is also Ranjiro's older brother and Ranzo's cousin.
Ken Midori / Kensuke Midorikawa (緑川 ケンスケ, Midorikawa Kensuke)
Voiced by: Tsubasa Yonaga (Japanese); Gabe Khouth (season 1-2), Kieran Regan (season 7) (English)
A ventriloquist blader who is a member of Beigoma Academy BeyClub until he leaves the club and later rejoins the club.
Daigo Kurogami / Daina Kurogami (黒神 ダイナ, Kurogami Daina)
Voiced by: Ayahi Takagaki (Japanese); Antony Kim (eps. 1–20), Zach LeBlanc (eps. 21–51, season 2) (English)
A member of Beigoma Academy BeyClub and captain of AS Gallus represents France. He is also Ryota's older brother.
Wakiya Murasaki / Wakiya Komurasaki (小紫 ワキヤ, Komurasaki Wakiya)
Voiced by: Yū Kobayashi (Japanese); Cole Howard (seasons 1-2), Howard Wang (seasons 5-7) (English)
A member of Beigoma Academy BeyClub and owner of Sunbat United and leads it to battle in the Beyblade World Championships.
Alexander Shakadera / Kaiza Xhakuenji (灼炎寺カイザ, Shakuenji Kaiza)
Voiced by: Rikiya Koyama (Japanese); Andrew Francis (seasons 1-2), Austin Lee Matthews (seasons 3, 7) (English)
Also known as Xander / Xhaka (シャカ, Shaka) is Valt and Shu's childhood friend and rival and the captain and founder of Sword Flames and captain of SB Rios represents Brazil. He is also one of the Supreme Four.
Lui Shirosagi / Lui Shirasagijo (白鷺城ルイ, Shirasagijo Rui)
Voiced by: Romi Park (Japanese); Travis Turner^{Ep. 32 credits} (seasons 1-2), Brandon Winckler (season 3, 5-6) (English)
The main antagonist of Burst series, Shu's old arch-rival and their greatest opponent. He is also one of the Supreme Four and former member of Team Rideout.
Silas Karlisle / Sisco Karlisle (シスコ・カーライル, Shisuko Kārairu)
Voiced by: Takuma Terashima (Japanese); Connor Parnall (season 2), Mark Whitten (seasons 3, 5) (English)
A member of BC Sol and was briefly a member of Sunbat United.
Cuza Ackerman / Kūza Akkāman (クーザアッカーマン&カール, Akkāman Kūza)
Voiced by: Junko Takeuchi (Japanese); Valin Shinyei (English)
A briefly member of German team Top Wand, later he joins BC Sol.
Free De La Hoya / Furī Derahōya (フリー・デラホーヤ, Derahōya Furī)
Voiced by: Ryoko Shiraishi (Japanese); Sean Thomas (season 2), Khoi Dao (seasons 3, 5-6) (English)
The No.1 Blader in the world and original captain of BC Sol until he left and became a member of Raging Bulls. He eventually returned to Spain and rejoined BC Sol.
Aiger Akabane / Aiga Akaba (赤刃アイガ, Akaba Aiga)
Voiced by: Tomoko Ikeda (Japanese); Laura Stahl (English)
The main protagonist of Burst Turbo series. A hot-headed 11-year old "wild child" who dreams to become World Champion after witnessing the strength of Valt Aoi.
Ranjiro Kiyama (黄山 乱次郎, Kiyama Ranjiro)
Voiced by: Fumihiro Okabayashi (Japanese); Derek Stephen Prince (English)
Also known as Cap'n (ソーチョー, Socho), Rantaro's younger brother, Ranzo's cousin and a leader of Wild Bey Gang.
Fubuki Sumiye / Fubuki Sumie (墨江フブキ, Sumie Fubuki)
Voiced by: Rikuya Yasuda (Japanese); Zachary Young (young, season 2), Billy Kametz (season 3) (English)
Second captain of Beigoma Academy BeyClub until he leaves for America to join the Raging Bulls.
Suoh Genji / Suoh Goshuin (御朱印スオウ, Goshuin Suoh)
Voiced by: Shinnosuke Tachibana (Japanese); Kyle McCarley (English)
A member of Beigoma Academy BeyClub and respected as well.
Phi (ファイ, Fai)
Voiced by: Takehito Koyasu (Japanese); Greg Chun, Casey Mongillo (young) (English)
The main antagonist of Burst Turbo series and one of Turbo 4, he is Hyde's older twin brother and Aiger's arch-nemesis.
Hyde / Hearts (ハーツ, Hātsu)
Voiced by: Takehito Koyasu (Japanese); Greg Chun,^{Turbo Ep. 29 credits} Allegra Clark (young) (English)
The antagonist of Burst Turbo series and Phi's younger twin brother. He's one of Turbo 4 and a former World Champion who lost to Valt, who is reclaim his World Champion belt.
Dante Koryu / Drum Koryu (虹龍ドラム, Kōryū Doramu)
Voiced by: Megumi Han (Japanese); Erika Harlacher (English)
The main protagonist of Burst Rise series and a member of Victories.
Arman Kusaba / Amane Kusaba (草葉アマネ, Kusaba Amane)
Voiced by: Atsushi Abe (Japanese); Griffin Puatu (English)
A member of Victories and older brother of Taka Kusaba.
Delta Zakuro / Delta Akane (茜デルタ, Akane Deruta)
Voiced by: Kensho Ono (Japanese); Brian Timothy Anderson (English)
One of the Risen 3 and a new member of Victories
Fumiya Kanemichi / Fumiya Kindo (金道フミヤ, Kindō Fumiya)
Voiced by: Natsuki Hanae (Japanese); Kory Getman (English)
Ichika's older brother and the leader and founder of his own team, the Spark Wings.
Arthur Peregrine / Arthur Percival (アーサー・パーシヴァル, Āsā Pāshivuaru)
Voiced by: Shouma Yamamoto (Japanese); Ben Diskin (English)
The main antagonist of Burst Rise series and leader of Inferno. He refers himself as the King of Hell (ヘルの王, Heru No Ō) and the Beyblade King (ベイブレードの王, Beiburēdo No Ō).
Gwyn Reynolds / Gwyn Ronny (グウィン・ロニー, Gūin Ronī)
Voiced by: Sumire Morohoshi (Japanese); Cristina Vee (English)
Second main antagonist of Burst Rise series and Dante's arch-rival.
Hikaru Hizashi / Hikaru Asahi (朝日ヒカル, Asahi Hikaru)
Voiced by: Haruka Tomatsu (Japanese); Jade Dennis (English)
One of the two main protagonists of Burst Surge series and Hyuga's older brother.
Hyuga Hizashi / Hyuga Asahi (朝日ヒュウガ, Asahi Hyūga)
Voiced by: Natsumi Fujiwara (Japanese); Ryan Bartley (English)
One of the two main protagonists of Burst Surge series and Hikaru's younger brother.
Lain Valhalla / Lean Walhalla (レーン・ヴァルハラ, Rēn Varuhara)
Voiced by: Kaito Ishikawa (Japanese); Daman Mills (English)
The main antagonist of Burst Surge series, Shu's former student and Hizashi brothers's arch-rival.
Bel Daizora (大黒天ベル, Daikokuten Beru)
Voiced by: Mutsumi Tamura (Japanese); Morgan Berry (English)
The main protagonist of Burst QuadDrive and Burst QuadStrike series. Also known as the Dark Prince / Demon King (魔王, Maō) and leader of Bey Graveyard "Phantom's Gate".
Ranzo Kiyama (ランソー・キヤマ, Ransō Kiyama)
Voiced by: Fumihiro Okabayashi (Japanese); Luis Bermudez (English)
A Blader from Brazil. He's a cousin of both Rantaro and Ranjiro.
Rashad Goodman (ラシャド・グッドマン, Rashado Guddoman)
Voiced by: Daisuke Ono (Japanese); Jordan Dash Cruz (English)
The main antagonist of Burst QuadDrive series. Also known as the High Prince / Supreme King (覇王, Haō), Former member of BC Sol and leader of Nexus who is Bel's arch-rival.
Bashara Suiro (翠竜バサラ, Suiryū Basara)
Voiced by: Katsumi Fukuhara (Japanese); Beau Bridgland (English)
Hanna's older brother who is a member of Nexus and Bel's rival.
Ilya Mao (イリヤ・マオ, Iriya Mao)
Voiced by: Lynn (Japanese); Brittany Cox (English)
A member of Nexus and Bel's rival.
Pri Forsythe (プリ・フォーサイス, Puri Fōsaisu)
Voiced by: Yō Taichi (Japanese); Anjali Kunapaneni (English)
Also known as Quadra (クアドラ, Kuadora) and is Pax's younger sister.
Pax Forsythe (パックス・フォーサイス, Pakkusu Fōsaisu)
Voiced by: Toshiki Masuda (Japanese); Darrel J Delfin (English)
The main antagonist of Burst QuadStrike series, Pri's older brother and Bel's arch-nemesis.

== Media ==
=== Manga ===
On November 15, 2021, it was announced that the manga would end on December 15, 2021.

No.	Release date	ISBN
1	December 28, 2015	978-4-09-142114-2
00. "Beyblade Burst Urgent Super Preview" (ベイブレードバースト緊急超予告, Beiburēdo Bāsuto Kinkyū Chō Yokoku); 01. "Let's Go, Partners!! Valtryek!!" (いこうぜ、相棒!ヴァルキリー!!, Ikōze, Aibō! Varukirī!!); 02. "The Guardian Watchdog, Kerbeus' Challenge" (堅守の番犬、ケルベウスの挑戦, Kenshū no Banken, Kerubeusu no Chōsen); 03. "The Jet-Black Attack Plane, Deathscyther's Surprise Attack" (漆黒の攻撃機、デスサイザー闇襲, Shikkoku no Kōgeki-ki, Desu Saizā Yamishū); 04. "The Fire Dragon Wyvern, Breaking the Impregnable Wings" (炎竜ワイバーン、炸裂する鉄壁の翼, Hiryū Waibān, Sakuretsu suru Teppeki no Tsubasa)
2	March 28, 2016	978-4-09-142153-1
05. "Battle Fairy Spriggan, The Iron Hammer of Friendship" (戦闘妖精スプリガン、渾身の鉄槌, Sentō Yōsei Supurigan, Konshin no Tettsui); 06. "The Dashing Valkyrie VS The Impeccable Spriggan, Decided!!" (爆進のヴァルキリーVS(バーサス)無欠のスプリガン、決着!!, Bakushin no Varukirī Bāsasu Muketsu no Supurigan, Ketchaku!!); 07. "Who's the Leader!? Bey Club Formation!!" (部長はだれに!?ベイクラブ結成!!, Buchō wa dare ni!? Bei Kurabu Kessei!!); 08. "Sacred Sword Xcalibur, Unparalleled Slash" (聖剣エクスカリバー、無双の斬撃, Seiken Ekusukaribā, Musō no Zangeki); 09. "Explosive Evolution, Victory Valkyrie!!" (進化爆誕、ビクトリーヴァルキリー!!, Shinka Bakutan, Bikutorī Varukirī!!)
3	July 28, 2016	978-4-09-142183-8
10. "The Water God Neptune, Battle of the Raging Sea!!" (水神ネプチューン、激浪の攻防!!, Suijin Nepuchūn, Gekirō no Kōbō!!); 11. "The Great BeyClub Invitation Plan!!" (ベイクラブ勧誘大作戦!!, Bei Kurabu Kan'yū Daisakusen!!); 12. "The Two-Winged Wall, The Flying Dragon Wyvern!!" (双翼の防壁、飛竜ワイバーン!!, Sōyoku no Bōheki, Hiryū Wyvern!!); 13. "Valkyrie's New Special Shoot Explodes!!" (ヴァルキリー、新必殺シュート炸裂!!, Varukirī, Shin Hissatsu Shūto Sakuretsu!!); 14. "The BeyClub Special Swimming Training!!" (ベイクラブ水泳特訓!!, Bei Kurabu Suiei Tokkun!!)
4	December 28, 2016	978-4-09-142269-9
SP1. "Xeno Xcalibur, the Unparalleled Sword of Flames!!" (ゼノエクスカリバー、天下無双の覇剣!!, Zeno Ekusukaribā, Tenkamusou no Haken!!); 15. "Magnificent Offense and Defense!! The Phantasmagoric Spriggan!!" (華麗な攻防!!変幻自在のスプリガン!!, Karei na Kōbō!! Hengen Jizai no Supurigan!!); 16. "Showdown! Battle God Valkyrie VS Holy Sword Xcalibur!!" (熱闘!!闘神ヴァルキリーVS(バーサス)聖剣エクスカリバー!!, Nettō!! Tōshin Varukirī Bāsasu Seiken Ekusukaribā!!); 17. "Victory Valkyrie's Miraculous Awakening!" (ビクトリーヴァルキリー、奇跡の覚醒!!, Bikutorī Varukirī, Kiseki no Kakusei!!); 18. "The Dreaded Special Training Course!? A Beybattle of Courage!!" (恐怖の特訓!?きもだめしベイバトル!!, Kyōfu no Tokkun!? Kimodameshi Bei Batoru!!); SP2. "Story of the Golden God Bey (Part 1)" (ゴールドゴッドベイ誕生物語(前編), Gōrudo Goddo Bei Tanjou Monogatari (Zenpen))
5	January 27, 2017	978-4-09-142287-3
SP3. "Story of the Golden God Bey (Part 2)" (ゴールドゴッドベイ誕生物語(後編), Gōrudo Goddo Bei Tanjou Monogatari (Kōhen)); 19. "The God Bey of Infinite Endurance, Zillion Zeus!!" (無限持久の神ベイ、ジリオンゼウス!!, Mugen Jikyū no Kami Bei, Jirion Zeusu!!); 20. "Storm Spriggan, an Instantaneous Attack!!" (ストームスプリガン、刹那の一撃!!, Sutōmu Supurigan, Setsuna no Ichigeki!!); 21. "Almighty God Zeus VS Battle God Valkyrie!!" (全能神ゼウスVS(バーサス)闘神ヴァルキリー!!, Zennōshin Zeusu Bāsasu Tōshin Varukirī!!); 22. "Spriggan VS Longinus, Showdown of Destiny!!" (スプリガンVS(バーサス)ロンギヌス、因緑の激突!!, Supurigan Bāsasu Ronginusu, innen no Gekitotsu!!); 23. "Roar of the Reverse Dragon! Lost Longinus' Super Revolution!!" (逆龍の咆哮!ロストロンギヌス超旋回!!, Gyakūryū no Hōkou! Rosuto Ronginusu Chōsenkai!!)
6	April 28, 2017	978-4-09-142386-3
SP4. "Lost Longinus – Legend of The Ultimate Dragon" (ロストロンギヌス最強我龍伝説, Rosuto Roginusu Saikyō Waga Ryū Densetsu); 24. "To the Battle! Valt's Super Training!!" (決戦へ!!バルト超特訓!!, Kessen he!! Baruto Chō Tokkun!!); 25. "The Finals Begin!! Longinus Nationals!!" (決勝戦開始!!ロンギヌス全国!!, Kesshōsen Kaishi!! Ronginusu Zenkoku!!); 26. "Winner of the Finals! The Surprising Conclusion!!" (決勝戦決着!!まさかの結末!!, Kesshōsen Kecchaku!! Masaka no Ketsumatsu!!); 27. "The World is the Stage!! Rivals Across the World!!" (世界が舞台!!ライバルは世界!!, Sekai ga Butai!! Raibaru wa Sekai!!)
7	October 27, 2017	978-4-09-142499-0
28. "A Passionately Heated Battle in the Cyclone Beystadium!!" (サイクロンベイスタジアムで激あつバトル!!, Saikuron Bei Sutajiamu de Geki atsu Batoru!!); SP5. "The Strongest Special Training with My Partner, Valkyrie!!" (相棒ヴァルキリーと最強特訓!!, Aibō Varukirī to Saikyō Tokkun!!); 29. "Blaze Ragnarok, the Steadfast Wall of Passion!!" (ブレイズラグナルク、不動の熱壁!!, Bureizu Ragunaruku, Fudō no Netsu Kabe!!); 30. "The Threatening Reverse Spin, Drain Fafnir!!" (脅威の逆旋回、ドレインファブニル!!, Kyōi no Gyaku Senkai, Dorein Fabuniru!!); 31. "Descend! The Time-Manipulating Alter Chornos!!" (降臨!時を操るアルタークロノス!!, Kōrin! Toki o Ayatsuru Arutā Kuronosu!!); 32. "The Cleaving Twin-Scythes! Killer Deathscyther!!" (双鎌の閃裂!死神キラーデスサイザー!!, Sō Kama no Senretsu! Shinigami Kirā Desusaizā!!); 33. "The Attack From Above, Soaring Maximus Garuda!!" (飛翔マキシマムガルーダ、滑空の一撃!!, Hishō Makishimamu Garūda, Kakkū no Ichigeki!!)
8	December 27, 2017	978-4-09-142603-1
34. "Legend Spryzen, The Flash Dual-Rotation!!" (レジェンドスプリガン、閃光の両回転!!, Rejendo Supurigan, Senkō no Ryō Kaiten!!); SP6. "The Invincible Turn, Shadow Orichalcum (Part 1)" (無敵旋回シャドウオリハルコン (前編), Muteki Senkai Shadō Oriharukon (Zenpen)); SP7. "The Invincible Turn, Shadow Orichalcum (Part 2)" (無敵旋回シャドウオリハルコン (後編), Muteki Senkai Shadō Oriharukon (Kōhen)); 35. "Impenetrable Barrier, Jinnus!!" (難攻不落の防壁、ブラストジニウス!!, Nankōfuraku no Bōheki, Burasuto Jiniusu!!); 36. "Super Training! Master the God Reboot!!" (超特訓! ゴッドリブートを習得せよ!!, Chō Tokkun! Goddo Ribūto O Shūtoku Seyo!!); 37. "Nightmare Luinor, The Nightmare Pursuit!!" (ナイトメアロンギヌス、悪夢の追撃!!, Naitomea Ronginusu, Akumu no Tsuigeki!!); 38. "The Unbeatable Destroying Sword, Sieg Excalius!!" (天下無双の破壊剣、ジークエクスカリバー!!, Tenkamusō no Hakaiken, Jīku Ekusukaribā!!)
9	April 27, 2018	978-4-09-142650-5
39. "Strike God Valtryek, The Super Giant Sword's Full Power Awakening!!" (撃ゴッドヴァルキリー、全力覚醒の超巨大刃!!, Sutoraiku Goddo Varukirī, Zenryoku Kakusei no Chōkyodai Ha!!); 40. "The Return of Nightmare!? The Messenger of Destruction Nightmare Luinor!!" (悪夢再来!? 破壊の使者ナイトメアロンギヌス!!, Akumu Sairai!? Hakai no Shisha Naitomea Ronginusu!!); 41. "Almghty God Spryen Requiem, Complete Battle!!" (全能神スプリガンレクイエム、完壁なる攻防!!, Zen'nōshin Supurigan Rekuiemu, Kan Kabenaru Kōbō!!); 42. "Fierce Training!! Control the Partner's Super Evolution!!" (激特訓! 超進化の相棒制御せよ!!, Geki Tokkun! Chō Shinka no Aibō o Seigyo Seyo!!); 43. "World Tournament's Final, the Best Friend Battle of Destiny!!" (世界大会決勝、運命の親友対決!!, Sekai Taikai Tesshō, Unmei no Shin'yū Taiketsu!!); SP8. "Ultimate God Bey, Double God Bey!! (Part 1)" (究極の神ベイ、ダブルゴッドベイ!!(前編), Kyūkyoku no Kami Bei, Daburu Goddo Bei!! (Zenpen)); SP9. "Ultimate God Bey, Double God Bey!! (Part 2)" (究極の神ベイ、ダブルゴッドベイ!!(後編), Kyūkyoku no Kami Bei, Daburu Goddo Bei!! (Kōhen))
10	August 28, 2018	978-4-09-142730-4
SP10. "Ultimate Evolution! Perfect Spryzen Requiem!!" (究極進化! 完全無欠のスプリガンレクイエム!!, Kyūkyoku Shinka! Kanzen Muketsu no Supurigan Rekuiemu!!); 44. "Birth of the Ruler of the World! Valkyrie VS Spriggan!!" (世界王者決定! ヴァルキリーVS(バーサス)スプリガン!!, Sekai Ōja Kettei! Varukirī Bāsasu Supurigan!!); 45. "The Best Friend Returns! Final Battle with the Genius, Shu" (親友の帰還! 天才・シュウ、最終の決着!!, Shin'yū no Kikan! Tensai Shū, Saishū no Ketchaku!!); 46. "Aiga and Z Achilles, Here Comes the Unbeatable Duo!" (アイガ&(アンド)ゼットアキレス、無敵コンビ見参!!, Aiga Ando Zetto Akiresu, Muteki Konbi Kenzan!!); 47. "The King of Defense, Emperor Forneus" (防御の皇帝、エンペラーフォルネウス!!, Bōgyo no Kōtei, Enperā Foruneusu!!); 48. "Crash Ragnaruk's Wind Assault" (クラッシュラグナルク、突風の迎撃!!, Kurasshu Ragunaruku, Toppū no Geigeki!!); SP11. "A Super Crazy Soccer Showdown!" (超Ƶ(ゼツ)波乱らんのサッカー対決!!, Chōzetsu Haran no Sakkā Taiketsu!!); SP12. "The Immortal Bey, Revive Phoenix!" (不死身のベイ、リヴァイブフェニックス!!, Fujimi no Bei, Ribaibu Fenikkusu!!)
11	November 28, 2018	978-4-09-142819-6
49. "Heat Salamander's Hurricane of Hell!!" (ヘルサラマンダー、地獄の旋風!!, Heru Saramandā, Jigoku no Senpū!); 50. "Miraculous Resonance! Z Achilles in Hot Pursuit!!" (奇跡の共鳴! ゼットアキレスの追撃!!, Kiseki no Kyōmei! Zetto Akiresu no Oitsugi!!); 51. "Archer Hercules' Unending Spin!!" (アーチャーヘラクレス、不動の永久旋回!!, Āchā Herakuresu, Fudō no Eikyū Senkai!!); 52. "The Immortal Revive Phoenix's Wing Attack!!" (不死鳥リヴァイブフェニックスの翼撃!!, Fushichō Rivaibu Fenikkusu no Yokugeki!!); SP13. "Turbo Bey of Darkness, Yamiterios!! (Part 1)" (闇の超Ƶ(ゼツ)ベイ、ヤミテリオス!!(前編), Yami no Chōzetsu Bei, Yamiteriosu!! (Zenpen)); SP14. "Turbo Bey of Darkness, Yamiterios!! (Part 2)" (闇の超Ƶ(ゼツ)ベイ、ヤミテリオス!! (後編), Yami no Chō Zetsu Bei, Yamiteriosu!! (Kōhen)); 53. "Steel Roar! Hazard Kerberus, The Guard Dog!!" (鋼鉄の咆哮! 番犬ハザードケルベウス!!, Kōtetsu no Hōkō! Banken Hazādo Kerubeusu!!)
12	April 26, 2019	978-4-09-142897-4
54. "Phenomenal Fangs! The Savage Beast, Vise Leopard!!" (驚異の牙! 猛獣ヴァイスレオパルド!!, Kyōi no Kiba! Mōjū Vaisu Reoparudo!!); 55. "Breaker Xcalius' Furious Swordplay!!" (バスターエクスカリバー、怒涛の剣戟!!, Basutā Ekusukaribā, Dotō no Kengeki!!); 56. "Bey of Fierce Absorption, Geist Fafnir!!" (最凶の吸収ベイ、ガイストファブニル!!, Saikyō no Kyūshū Bei, Gaisuto Fabuniru!!); 57. "Nether God Dread Hades' Heavy Blow of Death!!" (冥界神デッドハデス、死の重撃!!, Meikai Shin Deddo Hadesu, Shi no Jūgeki!!); 58. "Get Back The Bond! The Birth of Turbo Achilles!!" (絆を取りもどせ! 超Ƶ(ゼツ)アキレス誕生!!, Kizuna o Torimodose! Chō-Zetsu Akiresu Tanjō!!); 59. "Revive Phoenix's Supreme Resonance!!" (リヴァイブフェニックス、至高の共鳴!!, Rivaibu Fenikkusu, Shikō no Kyōmei!!); SP15. "Golden Monarch! Turbo Royal King Spryzen!! (Part 1)" (黄金の王者! 超Ƶ(ゼツ)ロイヤルキングS(スプリガン)!! (前編), Ōgon no Ōja! Chōzetsu Roiyaru Kingu Supurigan!! (Zenpen)); SP16. "Golden Monarch! Turbo Royal King Spryzen!! (Part 2)" (黄金の王者! 超Ƶ(ゼツ)ロイヤルキングS(スプリガン)!! (後編), Ōgon no Ōja! Chōzetsu Roiyaru Kingu Supurigan!! (Kōhen))
13	September 27, 2019	978-4-09-143080-9
SP17. "Imparting Skills! Battle of the Balance Turbo Beys!!" (真剣伝授! バランス型タイプ超Ƶ(ゼツ)覚醒対決!!, Shinkenden Ju! Baransu-gata Taipu Chōzetsu Kakusei Taiketsu!!); 60. "Incredible Absorption! The Strongest Shield, Orb Engaard!!" (驚異の吸着力りょく! 最強の盾オーブイイージス!!, Kyōi no Kyūchakuryoku! Saikyō no Tate Ōbu Iījisu!!); 61. "Final Battle! World Champion Title Match!!" (最終決戦! 世界王者タイトルマッチ!!, Saishū Kessen! Sekai Ōja Taitoru Matchi!!); 62. "A Champion is Born! True Partners – Aiger & Achilles!! (王者決定! 真の相棒アイガ&(アンド)アキレス!!, Ōja Kettei! Shin no Aibō Aiga Ando Akiresu!!); 63. "Knight of Flight, Air Knight's Stormy Offense and Defense!!" (滞空の騎士エアナイト、烈風の攻防!!, Taikū no Kishi Eanaito, Reppū no Kōbō!!); 64. "Dante & Ace Dragon – A New Legend Begins!!" (ドラム&(アンド)エースドラゴン、新な伝説の始まり!!, Doramu Ando Ēsu Doragon, Arata na Densetsu no Hajimari!!); 65. "Spin Attack! Bushin Ashindra's Multiple Blades!!" (旋回の迎撃! 連刃の鬼神ブシンアシュラ!!, Senkai no Geigeki! Renjin no Kishin Bushin Ashura!!); 66. "Better Launches?! Unconventional Bey Training!!" (シュート力りょくアップ!? 型破なベイ特訓!!, Shūto-ryoku Appu!? Katayaburi na Bei Tokkun!!); SP18. "Dante VS Delta! The Birth of Destined Rivals!!" (ドラムVS(バーサス)デルタ! 運命のライバル誕生!!, Doramu Bāsasu Deruta! Unmei no Raibaru Tanjō!!)
14	February 28, 2020	978-4-09-143147-9
67. "Wizard Fafnir – Non-Spinning Magician!!" (無回転の魔術師、ウィザードファブニル!!, Mukaiten no Majutsushi, Wizādo Fabuniru!!); 68. "Glyph Dragon'S Full Strength Counterattack!!" (全力突破!! グランドラゴンの反撃!!, Zenryoku Toppa!! Gurando Doragon no Hangeki!!); 69. "Judgement Joker's Trial Between Life and Death!!" (ジャッジメントジョーカー、生死を賭けた審判!!, Jajjimento Jōkā, Seishi o Kaketa Shinpan!!); 70. "A Bold Strike From The Hardy Dragon, Zone Lúinor!!" (硬龍ツヴァイロンギヌス、雄渾の一撃!!, Kōryū Tsuvai Ronginusu, Yūkon no Ippatsu Geki!!); 71. "Dante VS Delta – A Fateful Fight With No Holds Barred!!" (ドラムVS(たい)デルタ!! 因縁の全力ガチバトル!!, Doramu tai Deruta!! In'nen no Zenryoku Gachi Batoru!!); 72. "The Marvelous Bey Of Recovery, Harmony Pegasus!!" (驚異の回復ベイ!! 無敵の神馬ヘブンペガサス!!, Kyōi no Kaifuku Bei!! Muteki no Shinba Hebun Pegasasu!!)
15	June 26, 2020	978-4-09-143196-7
73. "Awakening The Inner Wildness!!" (呼びさませ、内に秘めし野生のチカラ!!, Yobisamase, Usa Ni Himeshi Yasei no Chikara!!); SP19. "Union of Passion!! The Birth of Drago Valtryek!! (Part 1)" (情熱の融合!! ドラゴヴァルキリー誕生!!(前編), Jōnetsu No Yūgō!! Dorago Varukirī Tanjō!! (Zenhen)); SP20. "Union of Passion!! The Birth of Drago Valtryek!! (Part 2)" (情熱の融合!! ドラゴヴァルキリー誕生!!(後編), Jōnetsu No Yūgō!! Dorago Varukirī Tanjō!! (Kōhen)); 74. "First Ever Three-Way World Champion Title Match in History!!" (史上初! 世界タイトルマッチ3人バトル開催!!, Shijō-hatsu! Sekai Taitoru Matchi Sannin Batoru Kaisai); 75. "Surpassing The Legend!! Highly Charged Three-Way Battle!!" (伝説を超えろ!! 緊迫の三つ巴大接戦!!, Densetsu o Koero!! Kinpaku no Mitsu Tomoe Daisessen!!); 76. "Royal Genesis' Electrical Acceleration!!" (レガリアジェネシス、電撃の旋回加速!!, Regaria Jeneshisu, Dengeki no Senkai Kasoku!!); 77. "Absolute Control!! King of Destruction Prime Apocalypse!! (絶対支配!! 破壊王プライムアポカリプス!!, Zettai Shihai!! Wakai-Ō Puraimu Apokaripusu!!); 78. "Turbulent Awakened Dragon, Command Dragon!!" (激動の覚醒龍、インペリアルドラゴン!!, Gekidō no Kakusei-Ryū, Inperiaru Doragon!!)
16	August 28, 2020	978-4-09-143218-6
79. "Perfect Circle of Beauty – Dusk Balkesh's Passion!!" (円状の完成美、ドレッドバハムートの熱情!!, En-jō no Kansei-bi, Doreddo Bahamūto no Netsujō!!); 80. "WBBA Versus HELL!! The Ultimate Tag Battle!!" (wbba.(ダブリュービービーエー) VS(たい) HELL(ヘル)!! 最強決定タッグバトル!!, Daburyū Bī Bī Ē Tai Heru!! Saikyō Kettei Taggu Batoru!!); 81. "Master Devolos – A Friendship Between Dragon and Devolos!!" (ドラゴン&(アンド)ディアボロス、友情のマスタードラゴン!!, Doragon Ando Diaborosu, Yūjō no Masutā Doragon!!); 82. "The Untold Story Behind The Birth of a New Bey System!" (頂点を超えろ!! 新システムベイ誕生秘話, Chōten o Koero!! Shin Shisutemu Bei Tanjō Hiwa); 83. "Bey Revolutionaries?! Hyuga and Hikaru Join The Fray!!" (ベイ界の革命児!? ヒュウガ&(アンド)ヒカル登場!!, Bei-kai No Kakumei-ji!? Hyūga Ando Hikaru Tōjō!!); 84. "Super Hyperion's Scorching Attacks!!" (灼炎の太陽、スーパーハイペリオンの猛攻!!, Shakuen no Taiyō, Sūpā Haiperion no Mōkō!!); 85. "Curse Satomb's Deflection and Overpowering Counter Drift!!" (流旋の悪魔カースサタン、圧巻の反撃ドリフト!!, Ryūsen no Akuma Kāsu Satan, Akkan no Hangeki Dorifuto!!)
17	November 26, 2020	978-4-09-143246-9
86. "All-Out Training!! Learning the Lightning Launch!!" (全力修行! スパーキングシュート習得!!, Zenryoku Shugyō! Supākingu Shūto Shūtoku!!); 87. "Raid Lúinor Bares Its Fangs of Fury!!" (破壊槍レイジロンギヌス、憤激の歯牙!!, Hakaisō Reiji Ronginusu, Fungeki no Shiga!!); 88. "Demise Devolos And How to Switch Strategies on The Fly!!" (戦略の回転変化、悪魔龍デスディアボロス!!, Senryaku no Kaiten Henge, Akuma-Ryū Desu Diaborosu!!); 89. "Limit Break!! Brotherly Synchronization Training!!" (限界突破!! 熱血兄弟シンクロ特訓!!, Genkai Toppa!! Nekketsu Kyōdai Shinkuro Tokkun!!); 90. "Vex Lucius' Crushing Flames of Offense and Defense!!" (破砕の攻防!! 凶炎バリアントルシファー!!, Hasai no Kōbō!! Kyō-en Barianto Rushifā!!); 91. "Triumph Dragon Awakens to Intercepting Attacks!!" (迎撃の覚醒!! 破壊龍テンペストドラゴン!!, Geigeki no Kakusei!! Hakairyū Tenpesuto Doragon!!); 92. "The Invincible World Spryzen's Final Lesson!!" (完全無敵!! ワールドスプリガン、最後の示教!!, Kanzen Muteki!! Wārudo Supurigan, Saigo No Shikyō!!)
18	March 26, 2021	978-4-09-143269-8
93. "Infinite Achilles' Turbo Sword Play!!" (インフィニットアキレス、超ゼツ無限の剣戟!!, Infinitto Akiresu, Chōzetsu Mugen no Kengeki!!); 94. "A Legendary Battle?! Survive The Battle Royale!!" (激闘伝説(レジェンド)級!? バトルロイヤルで勝ち上がれ!!, Gekitō Rejendo-Kyū!? Batoru Roiyaru de Kachi Agare!!); 95. "Sun God Helios Blazebringer's Scorching Speed!!" (焦熱の太陽神、ヘリオスポルケーノの快進!!, Shōnetsu no Taiyō-shin, Heriosu Borukēno no Kaishin!!); 96. "Brutal Crisis! Lucifer Endbringer!!" (無慈悲の災厄! ルシファージエンド!!, Mujihi no Saiyaku! Rushifā Ji Endo!!); 97. "Overcoming Fear With Encouragement From The Legends" (恐怖に打ち勝て! レジェンドたちの激励, Kyōfu ni uchikate! Rejendo-tachi no gekirei); 98. "Hyperion Flamebringer's Relentless Pursuit!!" (灼炎のハイペリオンバーン、 熱魂の追撃!!, Shakuen no Haiperion Bān, Netsukon no Tsuigeki!!); 99. "Miraculous Limit Break!! The Sun Brothers' Bond!!" (奇跡の限界突破(リミットブレイク)!! 太陽兄弟の絆!!, Kiseki no Rimitto Bureiku!! Taiyō Kyōdai no Kizuna!!)
19	November 26, 2021	978-4-09-143354-1
100. "Dynamite Belial, The Demon World's Debut Battle!!" (ダイナマイトベリアル、魔界の闘技開幕!!, Dainamaito Beriaru, Makai No Tōgi Kaimaku!!); 101. "Raging Gale! Cyclone Ragnarok's Heavy Attack!!" (疾風怒濤サイクロンラグナルクの重撃, Shippū Dotō! Saikuron Ragunaruku no Jiyūgeki!!); 102. "Vanish Fafnir, The Messenger Who Beats The Demon King!!" (魔王をたおす使者、バニッシュファブニル!!, Maō o Taosu Shisha, Banisshu Fabuniru!!); 103. "Morphing Defense! Roar Bahamut, Full-Body Offense & Defense!!" (変形防御! ロアバハムート、渾身の攻防, Henkei Bōgyo! Roa Bahamūto, Konshin no Kōbō!!); 104. "Iron Hammer of Justice! Onslaught of Savior Valkyrie!!" (正義の鉄槌! 猛攻のセイバーヴァルキリー!!, Seigi no Tettsui! Mōkō no Seibā Barukirī!!); SP21. "Search for the Legendary Part, Devil Blade!!" (伝説のパーツ、デビルブレードを探せ!!, Densetsu no Pātsu, Debiru Burēdo o Saga Se); SP22. "Bonded Again!! Shu VS Lane, Master and Disciple Battle!!" (絆よ再び!! シュウVS(たい)レーン、師弟バトル!!, Kizuna Yo Futatabi!! Shū Tai Rēn, Shitei Batoru!!)
20	March 28, 2022	978-4-09-143386-2
105. "Unrestrained Strategy!! The Astral Spriggan's Extreme Transformations!!" (戦略自在!! 究極の変幻アストラルスプリガン!!, Senryaku Jizai!! Kyūkyoku no Hengen Asutoraru Supurigan!!); 106. "Guilty Longinus, Assault of the Eight Rising Dragons!!" (ギルティロンギヌス、八昇龍の強襲, Giruti Ronginusu, Hasshō Ryū no Kyōshū!!); 107. "Armed Supreme Halo, Greatest Rafael!!" (至上の光輪武装、グレイテストラファエル!!, Shijō no Kōrin Busō, Gureitesuto Rafaeru!!); 108. "The Devil's Storm, Belial's Rampage!!" (暴嵐の悪魔、デンジャラスベリアルの跳梁!!, Bōran no Akuma, Denjarasu Beriaru no Chōryō!!); 109. "Clashing Beliefs!! Darklord Bell VS Overlord Rashad!!" (激突する信念!! 魔王ベルVS(たい)覇王ラシャド!!, Gekitotsu suru Shin'nen!! Maō Beru tai Haō Rashado!!); SP23. "Ultimate Valkyrie, Extreme Awakening!!" (アルティメットヴァルキリー、極限の覚醒!!, Arutimetto Barukirī, Kyokugen no Kakusei!!)

=== Anime ===
An anime television series adaptation was announced on June 18, 2015, by D-rights and Takara Tomy. The anime is produced by OLM and directed by Katsuhito Akiyama with character designs by Toshiaki Ōhashi and Hideki Sonoda handling series composition. The anime aired on TXN between April 4, 2016, and March 27, 2017. An English dub of the anime premiered on Teletoon in Canada on September 10, 2016 and on Disney XD on October 2. The dub premiered on 9Go! in Australia on 5 December 2016 and on Disney XD in the United States on December 19, 2016. An English subtitled version began streaming on Daisuki in the United States on December 27, 2016, from 9:30 am, until the website went defunct in 2017.

On February 11, 2017, it was announced that the anime television series was confirmed for a second season, titled Beyblade Burst God. The season is directed by Kentaro Yamaguchi with Katsuhito Akiyama serving as chief director. Hideki Sonoda and Toshiaki Ōhashi are returning from Beyblade Burst for series composition and character design, respectively. Hiroki Matsuoka is the sound effects director, and Zain Effendi is composing the music. The second season aired between April 3, 2017, and March 26, 2018. An English dub of the anime premiered on Teletoon in Canada on November 4, 2017 and on Disney XD in the United States on December 4, 2017.

On February 8, 2018, it was announced that the anime television series was confirmed for a third season, titled Beyblade Burst Chōzetsu. The main staff for the previous series are returning at OLM. The third season aired between April 2, and March 25, 2019. An English dub of the anime premiered on Teletoon in Canada on October 7, 2018 and on Disney XD in the United States on December 15, 2018.

On February 15, 2019, it was announced that the anime television series was confirmed for a fourth season, titled Beyblade Burst GT. The series streamed weekly on the CoroCoro YouTube channel, the official Beyblade portal website, and the Takara Tomy Channel between April 5, 2019, and March 27, 2020. Katsuhito Akiyama is the show's chief director, and Ojing is directing the series at OLM. Hideki Sonoda is returning to oversee the series scripts, and Toshiaki Ōhashi is returning to design the characters. d-rights is producing the series. An English dub of the anime premiered on Disney XD in the United States on February 8, 2020.

On March 13, 2020, it was announced that the anime television series was confirmed for a fifth season, titled Beyblade Burst Sparking. The anime aired from April 3, 2020, to March 19, 2021, on the CoroCoro Channel and the Takara Tomy Channel on YouTube. Katsuhito Akiyama is the chief director, and Jin Gu Oh is directing the anime at OLM. Hideki Sonoda is overseeing the series scripts, and Toshiaki Ōhashi is the character designer. An English dub of the anime premiered on Disney XD in the United States on February 20, 2021.

On December 15, 2020, it was announced that the anime television series was confirmed for a sixth season titled Beyblade Burst Dynamite Battle. The anime aired between April 2, 2021, and March 18, 2022, on the CoroCoro Channel and the Takara Tomy Channel on YouTube. Katsuhito Akiyama is the chief director, and Jin Gu Oh is directing the anime at OLM. Hideki Sonoda is overseeing the series scripts, and Toshiaki Ōhashi is the character designer. Frederik Weidmann is composing the music. An English dub of the anime premiered on Disney XD and DisneyNOW in the United States on December 4, 2021.

On December 2, 2022, it was announced a seventh and final season of the series Beyblade Burst QuadStrike would be released for the international market in spring 2023. The series premiered on Disney XD on April 3, 2023, and was released on Hulu on May 8.

=== Merchandise ===
Hasbro and Sunrights are launching the toyline outside of Japan. Toys "R" Us started distributing the toys in Canada in September 2016 and Hasbro started distributing the toys in the United States in January 2017.
