= BeyWarriors: Cyborg =

Canadian-Japanese anime television series

- Key visual
- Genre: Action, adventure, science fiction, sports
- Created by: Katsumi Hasegawa
- Anime television series
- Directed by: Kunihisa Sugishima
- Produced by: Mamiko Aoki
- Written by: Katsumi Hasegawa
- Music by: Catalin Marin
- Studio: Nelvana, SynergySP, d-rights
- Licensed by: JP: d-rights; NA: Nelvana (dropped)
- Original network: K2 (1–14)
- English network: IN: Super Hungama; SEA: Toonami Asia
- Original run: October 18, 2014 – February 27, 2015
- Episodes: 26 + 2 specials
- Related works
- Beyblade; Beyblade: Metal Fusion; BeyWheelz; BeyWarriors: BeyRaiderz; Beyblade Burst; Beyblade X

BeyWarriors: Cyborg is an anime series, a spin-off of the Beyblade franchise. Commissioned by Nelvana and produced by SynergySP, the series follows BeyWheelz and BeyWarriors: BeyRaiderz in being created primarily for the Western market. The standalone show has 26 episodes.

Despite being produced for a Western audience, BeyWarriors: Cyborg has seen limited distribution outside of Asia. The series initially debuted on K2 on October 18, 2014, in Italy where the show's first 14 episodes ran before being abruptly pulled from the schedule. Following the disappointing results of Beyblade: Shogun Steel and BeyWarriors: BeyRaiderz, Nelvana dropped the series, giving distribution rights to the Japanese company, d-rights and Hasbro's toyline was cancelled. An English dubbed version started airing on Toonami Asia and Toonami India on October 3, 2015. The Japanese version of the series began streaming on February 27, 2015, on the Anime Hodai streaming service. It was later streamed on U-Next.

In conjunction with the channel's then upcoming broadcast of Beyblade Burst, Disney XD in the United States acquired the catalog rights to the entire Beyblade franchise in late 2016. This included BeyWarriors: Cyborg, though as of 2023 the series remains unreleased in North America.

== Plot ==
The newest series of the Beyblade saga is BeyWarriors: Cyborg, warriors who resemble half-creatures and half-machines. Mysterious objects called "Beyraiderz" are found in the sanctuaries of Teslandia. The Cyborg Warriors transform the energy released from the sanctuaries into small objects called Tokens. Who will win more battles to collect the most Tokens? The series is set in the future sometime around the 22nd century, where humanity has colonized space.

"Teslandia" is an abandoned planet, ignored by the rest of the nearby planets due to its harsh environment. The story begins with Nico, Al and Sola. They must get the most Tokens possible. When power spots containing high levels of energy called "Sanctuaries" are identified, and mysterious vehicle shaped items called "Beyraiderz" are found along with the Sanctuaries, the Beyraiderz can synchronize with the youths under the age of 17 living in Teslandia, and summon the Cyborg creatures known as "Warriors." The Warrior can transform high level "Sanctuary" energy into small Tokens. This means that human beings are able to obtain energy by making the "Warriors" battle against each other to turn the arid wasteland into a lush and bountiful world.

So, who will win the most battles and collect the most Tokens? What mystery lies behind each Warrior?

A group of invincible warriors with features of half-humans and half-machines can transform energy into small artifacts called 'Tokens'. Who will win the battles now?

When the Warrior Battles start, two mysterious Warriors appear in the desert next to the stone region. These two mysterious battlers have the ability to give power to a Warrior to summon another Warrior in a battle and also the power to take away Tokens from the sanctuary directly from the symbols carved on the chest of the BeyWarriors. Who are these mysterious Warriors?

== Characters ==
Nico
Voiced by: Ryota Asari (Japanese); David Lee Mckinney (English)
Al
Voiced by: Ryohei Arai (Japanese); David Lee Mckinney (English)
Sola
Voiced by: Risa Shimizu (Japanese); Muriel Hofmann (English)
Dr. Prost
Voiced by: Shige Ushiyama
Ramon
Voiced by: Hiro Yuuki, Yuko Sanpei (Japanese); Dave Bridges (English)
Augusto Claudius Lucius
Voiced by: Daisuke Kirii (Japanese); Conor Spangfort (English)
Marius
Voiced by: Shinnosuke Tachibana (Japanese); David Lee Mckinney (English)
Gai
Voiced by: Tōru Nara (Japanese); Dave Bridges (English)
Sid
Voiced by: Shintaro Ohata (Japanese); Michael Pizzuto (English)
Jean
Voiced by: Mitsuhiro Ichiki (Japanese); David Lee Mckinney (English)
Gere
Voiced by: Takuma Terashima (Japanese); Dave Bridges (English)
Bran
Voiced by: Hozumi Goda (Japanese); Michael Pizzuto (English)
Zed
Voiced by: David Lee Mckinney
Le Luca & Ray
Voiced by: Kei Shindō
Homura
Voiced by: Satsuki Yukino (Japanese); Muriel Hofmann (English)
The Commander of Flame.
Duke Paul
Voiced by: Eizo Tsuda (Japanese); Michael Pizzuto (English)
One of August's servants.
Roco
Voiced by: Eri Goda
Haltman & Oto
Voiced by: Kana Omuro
Z
Voiced by: Tsuyoshi Koyama
Dewey & Cherim
Voiced by: Yuuki Hayashi
Dieter
Voiced by: Mutsumi Tamura
Reule
Voiced by: Aya Hisakawa
Olin
Voiced by: Shunsuke Sakuya
Tejite
Voiced by: Aki Kanada
Lagran
Voiced by: Satoshi Taki
Pielle
Voiced by: Takashi Matsuyama (Japanese); Michael Pizzuto (English)
The Prime Minister of Lightning.
Earl Ditli
Voiced by: Seiko Ueda

== Development ==
During May 2013 at the "Floor Plan" of the then-upcoming annual Las Vegas Licensing Expo 2013, Nelvana announced through it two, new television series placed under the working titles "BeyWarriors Cyborg" and "BeyRaiderz Shogun". BeyWarriors Cyborg was given a tentative "Fall 2014" release slate. On June 11, 2013, Nelvana revealed the series would consist of 28 episodes: 26 half-hour episodes and 2 one-hour specials. It was also revealed to launch in over 80 countries with music composed by Catalin Marin, a newcomer to the Beyblade scoring scene taking over from Neil Parfitt and Scott Bucsis who have traditionally done the music for the last, four main Beyblade anime entries. It was also during this time that the series had entered post-production.

On September 9, 2013, a press release sent out by Nelvana confirmed "BeyWarriors: BeyRaiderz" (originally known by BeyRaiderz Shogun) and "BeyWarriors Cyborg" as the near-finalized names of the aforementioned series with the latter confirmed again for its fall 2014 release window as well as to "include revolutionary new play patterns from Hasbro" and "lots of exciting new promotions".

From October 15–17, 2013, Nelvana presented BeyWarriors BeyRaiderz and BeyWarriors Cyborg at the annual Brand Licensing Expo 2013 in Olympia, London.

On April 4, 2014, Nelvana released their "MIPTV Newsletter" for the month promoting their most recent properties and revealing their programming plans for the years of 2015 and 2016. BeyWarriors Cyborg was nowhere to be found, suggesting that its planned release in the fall of 2014 has been postponed with a currently unknown date.

As of May 13, 2014, Nelvana has confirmed "Beywarriors Cyborg is still a production in development conversations" though its anime and toy line were acknowledged.

On May 21, 2014, Yoshihiro Nagamori, the character designer for the anime stated it was still in production and expressed his desire for it to air in Japan.

On June 1, 2014, Yoshihiro Nagamori reiterated his hope for a Japanese broadcast but explained that he does not know whether it is possible and while currently he cannot reveal any details about it, he may begin dropping hints should the series air in Japan.

On June 14, 2014, when asked why the series was delayed, Yoshihiro Nagamori stated that personally, he does not know.

From June 17–19, 2014, instead of Nelvana, d-rights brought BeyWarriors Cyborg and other Beyblade brands to the Las Vegas Licensing Expo 2014

On July 8, 2014, it was confirmed that the series will begin airing in Italy on the Italian channel K2 every Saturday and Sunday at 11:15 A.M. starting on September 20, 2014. A synopsis of the series was also released:

"Italian: La nuova serie della saga di Beyblade con i BeyWarriors Cyborg, guerrieri dall'aspetto di metà creature e metà macchine. Dei misteriosi oggetti chiamati "Beyraiderz" vengono ritrovati nei santuari di Teslandia. I Cyborg Warriors trasformano l'energia sprigionata dai santuari in piccoli oggetti chiamati Gettoni. Chi vincerà più battaglie conquistando il maggior numero di Gettoni? English translation: The newest series of the Beyblade saga is BeyWarriors Cyborg, warriors who resemble half-creatures and half-machines. Mysterious objects called "Beyraiderz" are found in the sanctuaries of Teslandia. The Cyborg Warriors transform the energy released from the sanctuaries into small objects called Tokens. Who will win more battles to collect the most Tokens?"

Despite this announcement, plans changed and without warning, K2 pulled the series from their schedules and as a result, the series did not air in September. It is unknown if the anime is intended to air on K2 at a later time. Sometime in early-October 2014, the d-rights website completed a massive site renovation and released new information regarding the show. The final name for the show was confirmed to be BeyWarriors: Cyborg. They debuted two images, one of a series logo and another a promotional poster. An extended synopsis of the Italian one released in July was presented, revealing new plot details. The series was also discovered to be produced under "BWProject" which is the same project name they used for BeyWheelz. Interestingly, d-rights classifies the series as a program for both kids and teens, suggesting this anime will be aimed at an older demographic than previous Beyblade anime.

On October 12, 2014, it was discovered that the series is now set to premiere in Italy on October 18, 2014, on channel K2 at 7:30. The second episode will air the following day with new episodes airing every weekends.

== Episode list ==
No.	Title	Original release date	English airdate (HK/SING/PH)	Japanese release date (Japan)
1	"First Battle"; Transliteration: "Uijin" (Japanese: 初陣)	October 18, 2014 (Italy K2 Channel)	October 3, 2015 (Toonami Asia)	February 27, 2015 (Anime Hodai)
Nico, who lives in the Wind Country, summons a 'Warrior' by chance. Ever since that, young boys in every country started to summon Warriors. The countries concluded that the country that wins the Warrior Battles will obtain the energy.
2	"The King of Lions"; Transliteration: "Shishiou" (Japanese: 獅子王)	October 19, 2014 (Italy K2 Channel)	October 4, 2015 (Toonami Asia)	February 27, 2015 (Anime Hodai)
The second match of 'Warrior Battles' is Sunburst VS Stone. The Kingdom of the Sun, Sunburst's Augusto summons Sabre Lion. When Stone's Gai summons Iron Minotaur, the surroundings start to darken...
3	"Oath"; Transliteration: "Chikai" (Japanese: 誓い)	October 25, 2014 (Italy K2 Channel)	October 10, 2015 (Toonami Asia)	February 27, 2015 (Anime Hodai)
Because Hydro withdrew from the 'Warrior Battles', it was to be discussed at the country's representative meeting, but the leader didn't appear. Meanwhile, since the next battle's opponent has not been chosen, Lightning's members return to their home town.
4	"Turbulence"; Transliteration: "Rankiryū" (Japanese: 乱気流)	October 26, 2014 (Italy K2 Channel)	October 11, 2015 (Toonami Asia)	February 27, 2015 (Anime Hodai)
Although the nobles were judging, Marius swears his loyalty to Augusto. Marius had already investigated the Sanctuary where Lightning and Sunburst will battle, and challenges them to a fight while even reading the wind.
5	"The Phoenix"; Transliteration: "Fushichō" (Japanese: 不死鳥)	November 1, 2014 (Italy K2 Channel)	October 17, 2015 (Toonami Asia)	February 27, 2015 (Anime Hodai)
6	"The Desert"; Transliteration: "Sabaku" (Japanese: 砂漠)	November 2, 2014 (Italy K2 Channel)	October 18, 2015 (Toonami Asia)	February 27, 2015 (Anime Hodai)
7	"Determination"; Transliteration: "Shūnen" (Japanese: 執念)	November 8, 2014 (Italy K2 Channel)	October 24, 2015 (Toonami Asia)	February 27, 2015 (Anime Hodai)
8	"Heaven's Decree"; Transliteration: "Tenmei" (Japanese: 天命（テンメイ）)	November 9, 2014 (Italy K2 Channel)	October 25, 2015 (Toonami Asia)	February 27, 2015 (Anime Hodai)
9	"Intruder"; Transliteration: "Shinnyūsha" (Japanese: 侵入者)	November 15, 2014 (Italy K2 Channel)	October 31, 2015 (Toonami Asia)	February 27, 2015 (Anime Hodai)
10	"The Guardian"; Transliteration: "Shugoshin" (Japanese: 守護神)	November 16, 2014 (Italy K2 Channel)	November 1, 2015 (Toonami Asia)	February 27, 2015 (Anime Hodai)
11	"The Fiery Dragon"; Transliteration: "Kaenryū" (Japanese: 火炎竜)	November 22, 2014 (Italy K2 Channel)	November 7, 2015 (Toonami Asia)	February 27, 2015 (Anime Hodai)
12	"Nightmare"; Transliteration: "Okumu" (Japanese: 悪夢)	November 23, 2014 (Italy K2 Channel)	November 8, 2015 (Toonami Asia)	February 27, 2015 (Anime Hodai)
13	"Conspiracy"; Transliteration: "Inbō" (Japanese: 陰謀)	November 29, 2014 (Italy K2 Channel)	November 14, 2015 (Toonami Asia)	February 27, 2015 (Anime Hodai)
14	"Settlement"; Transliteration: "Ketchaku" (Japanese: 決着)	November 30, 2014 (Italy K2 Channel)	November 15, 2015 (Toonami Asia)	February 27, 2015 (Anime Hodai)
15	"Invasion"; Transliteration: "Shūrai" (Japanese: 襲来)	TBA	November 21, 2015 (Toonami Asia)	February 27, 2015 (Anime Hodai)
16	"Alliance"; Transliteration: "Dōmei" (Japanese: 同盟)	TBA	November 22, 2015 (Toonami Asia)	February 27, 2015 (Anime Hodai)
17	"Clash"; Transliteration: "Gekitō" (Japanese: 激突)	TBA	January 22, 2016 (Toonami Asia)	February 27, 2015 (Anime Hodai)
18	"Truth"; Transliteration: "Shinjitsu" (Japanese: 真実)	TBA	January 29, 2016 (Toonami Asia)	February 27, 2015 (Anime Hodai)
19	"Demon Beast"; Transliteration: "Majū" (Japanese: 魔獣)	TBA	January 30, 2016 (Toonami Asia)	February 27, 2015 (Anime Hodai)
20	"Flash"; Transliteration: "Senkō" (Japanese: 閃光)	TBA	February 5, 2016 (Toonami Asia)	February 27, 2015 (Anime Hodai)
King August reaches his lowest point as Bran's plans start to take shape.
21	"Collapse"; Transliteration: "Hōkai" (Japanese: 崩壊)	TBA	February 6, 2016 (Toonami Asia)	February 27, 2015 (Anime Hodai)
22	"Advance"; Transliteration: "Shingeki" (Japanese: 進撃)	TBA	February 13, 2016 (Toonami Asia)	February 27, 2015 (Anime Hodai)
23	"Pride"; Transliteration: "Hokori" (Japanese: 誇り)	TBA	February 20, 2016 (Toonami Asia)	February 27, 2015 (Anime Hodai)
Marius takes on King August.
24	"Evil God"; Transliteration: "Jashin" (Japanese: 邪神)	TBA	February 21, 2016 (Toonami Asia)	February 27, 2015 (Anime Hodai)
25	"Death Match"; Transliteration: "Shitō" (Japanese: 死闘)	TBA	February 27, 2016 (Toonami Asia)	February 27, 2015 (Anime Hodai)
26	"Bonds"; Transliteration: "Kizuna" (Japanese: 絆)	TBA	February 28, 2016 (Toonami Asia)	February 27, 2015 (Anime Hodai)
The future of Teslandia is decided in this epic conclusion to the BeyWarriors saga.
SP–1	"Past"; Transliteration: "Kako" (Japanese: 過去)	TBA	TBA	February 27, 2015 (Anime Hodai)
On the planet of Teslandia, giant cyborg creatures fight as entertainment.
SP–2	"Future"; Transliteration: "Mirai" (Japanese: 未来)	TBA	TBA	February 27, 2015 (Anime Hodai)
Is it already too late to save Teslandia?
