= Beyblade X =

Japanese manga series

- Cover of the first volume
- Manga
- Written by: Homura Kawamoto; Hikaru Muno
- Illustrated by: Posuka Demizu
- Published by: Shogakukan
- English publisher: NA: Viz Media; SG: Shogakukan Asia
- Imprint: Coro Coro Comics
- Magazine: CoroCoro Comic
- Original run: May 15, 2023 – present
- Volumes: 10
- Anime television series
- Directed by: Katsuhito Akiyama (chief) (1–100); Moto Terada; Dai Fukuyama (101–134)
- Written by: Kazuho Hyōdō (1–39); Hikaru Muno (38–134); Kōji Bandai (75–)
- Music by: Sebastian Robertson
- Studio: OLM Team Masuda
- Licensed by: ADK Emotions NY, Inc.; T-Licensing
- Original network: TXN (TV Tokyo)
- English network: AU: 9Go!; CA: Cartoon Network (Canada); NZ: TVNZ 2; PH: Cartoon Network; UK: CBBC; US: Disney XD
- Original run: October 6, 2023 – present
- Episodes: 141
- Video game

BEYBLADE X XONE
- Developer: GrooveBoxJapan
- Publisher: FuRyu
- Platform: Nintendo Switch; Windows
- Released: November 14, 2024
- Video game

BEYBLADE X EVOBATTLE
- Developer: GrooveBoxJapan
- Publisher: FuRyu
- Platform: Nintendo Switch; Windows; Nintendo Switch 2
- Released: November 13, 2025; December 18, 2025 (Switch 2)
- Related manga
- Beyblade; Metal Fight Beyblade; Metal Fight Beyblade Zero-G; Beyblade: Burst
- Related anime
- Beyblade; Beyblade: Metal Fusion; BeyWheelz; BeyWarriors: BeyRaiderz; BeyWarriors: Cyborg; Beyblade: Burst

Beyblade X (stylized in all caps) is a Japanese manga, anime and toyline based on Takara Tomy and ADK Emotions' Beyblade franchise. The fourth generation of the franchise, the Beyblade X toyline was launched on July 15, 2023, while the original manga has been serialized in Shogakukan's children's manga magazine CoroCoro Comic since May 2023, two months before the toyline's debut.

The anime adaptation, produced by OLM premiered on TV Tokyo and its affiliates in October 2023. ADK Emotions NY, Inc. and T-Licensing released the anime in English in 2024.

== Plot ==
Amateur Blader Robin Kazami finds himself out of a team when he is ditched by his friends after a crushing defeat. Lucky for him, a chance encounter with former champion Jaxon Cross leads these two unlikely teammates to join forces. Jaxon intends to climb back to the top of The X under the alias "Blader X" and challenge his old teammate and current champion, Khrome Ryugu. When they find a third team member in mega-popular influencer Multi Nana-iro, the newly-formed Team Persona set their sights on going pro and claiming their spot at the top.

== Characters ==
=== Main ===
Jaxon Cross (黒須エクス, Kurosu Ekusu) / Blader X (仮面X, Kamen Ekkusu)
Voiced by: Soma Saito (Japanese); AJ Beckles (English)
Former member of Team Pendragon and the founder of Team Persona.
Robin Kazami (風見バード, Kazami Bādo)
Voiced by: Shūichirō Umeda (Japanese); Caleb Yen (English)
Former leader of Team Albatross and the leader of Team Persona.
Multi Nana-iro (七色マルチ, Nanairo Maruchi)
Voiced by: Ruriko Noguchi (Japanese); Anairis Quiñones (English)
Former and only member of Team Rainbow, a member of Team Persona and Sigrid's younger sister.
Tenka Shiroboshi (白星テンカ, Shiroboshi Tenka)
Voiced by: Yūko Natsuyoshi (Japanese); Justine Lee (English)
Blader and member of Team Persona, an Instructor of the Shiroboshi Style School and Omega's daughter.
Nine Cross (黒須ナイン, Kurosu Nain)
Voiced by: Momoko Miyashiro (Japanese); Cristina Vee (English)
Blader and Jaxon's sister.

=== Supporting ===
Khrome Ryugu (龍宮クロム, Ryugu Kuromu) / Blader Y (仮面Y, Kamen Wai)
Voiced by: Kaito Ishikawa (Japanese); Stephen Fu (English)
Champion of the Pro League and leader of Team Pendragon, he lost to Jaxon Cross in the title match. He returns in season two as a pawn of Omega Shiriboshi, who gave him the powerful Beyblade Impact Drake.
Sigrid Nana-iro (七色シグル, Nanairo Shiguru)
Voiced by: Mariya Ise (Japanese); Amber May (English)
Blader and member of Team Pendragon and Multi's older sister. She is a model, she defeated Multi in the title match
Ciel Kaminari (神成シエル, Kaminari Shieru) / Blader Z (仮面Z, Kamen Zetto)
Voiced by: Kazuki Furuta (Japanese); Zeno Robinson (English)
Blader and member of Team Pendragon. Former rookie, who joined the team after Jackson's departure, he was forced to wear a "blader Z' mask to model Jackson's own person "Blader X". He narrowly defeated Robin in the title match. In season two he returns as an apprentice of Quinn Manju, and obtains the bey Shelter Drake.
Takumi Ishiyama (石山タクミ, Ishiyama Takumi)
Voiced by: Kenn (Japanese); Clifford Chapin (English)
Blader and leader of Team Phalanx.
Bariki Jinai (陣内バリキ, Jinnai Bariki)
Voiced by: Fumitake Ishiguro (Japanese); Daniel Walton (English)
Blader and member of Team Phalanx.
Genri Sayo (左様ゲンリ, Sayō Genri)
Voiced by: Tomohiro Oomachi (Japanese); John Patneaude (English)
Blader and member of Team Phalanx.
Taisho Sushiya (寿司谷タイショー, Sushiya Taishō)
Voiced by: Ken Uo (Japanese); Michael Sorich (English)
Former blader and owner of Komaba Zushi restaurant.
Meiko Myoden (冥殿メイコ, Meiden Meiko)
Voiced by: Ruriko Aoki (Japanese); Lauren Landa (English)
Former pro blader and maid who works at the Komaba Zushi restaurant.
Titus Manju (万獣キング, Manjū Kingu)
Voiced by: Ryōta Suzuki (Japanese); Nazeeh Tarsha (English)
Blader and leader of Team Zooganic and Quinn's Grandson.
Toguro Okunaga (億長トグロ, Okunaga Toguro)
Voiced by: Daiki Hamano (Japanese); Tommy Arciniega (English)
Blader and member of Team Zooganic.
Jian Strong (チョー・パン, Chō Pan)
Voiced by: Yuki Wakai (Japanese); Jenny Yokobori (English)
Blader and member of Team Zooganic.
Warden (カドバー, Kadobā)
Voiced by: Makoto Furukawa (Japanese); Damien Haas (English)
Member and pro blader of World Beyblade Management Organisation.
Blaze Fujiwara (不死原バーン, Fujiwara Bān)
Voiced by: Yūsuke Kobayashi (Japanese); Kevin Andrew Rivera (English)
Blader and leader of Team Yggdrasil.
Zonamos Nekoyama (猫山ゾナモス, Nekoyama Zonamosu)
Voiced by: Mitsuaki Kanuka (Japanese); Ben Balmaceda (English)
Blader and member of Team Yggdrasil.
Yuni Naniwa (難波ゆに, Nanba Yuni)
Voiced by: Ryōko Maekawa (Japanese); Amber Lee Connors (English)
Blader and member of Team Yggdrasil.
Quinn Manju (万獣クイン, Manjū Kuin)
Voiced by: Tomoko Miyadera (Japanese); Barbara Goodson (English)
Blader and leader of temporary Team Dreams and Titus's Grandmother.
Rex Jura (珠羅レックス, Jūra Rekkusu)
Voiced by: Reiou Tsuchida (Japanese); Bill Butts (English)
Blader and member of temporary Team Dreams.
Packun (ぱっくん, Pakkun)
Voiced by: Gen Satō (Japanese); Paul Castro Jr. (English)
Blader and member of temporary Team Dreams.
Karla Konjiki (金色カルラ, Konjiki Karura)
Voiced by: Ayumi Tsuji (Japanese); Bryn Apprill (English)
Blader and leader of Team Gordius.
Reiyu Kuwabara (桑原レイユ, Kuwabara Reiyu)
Voiced by: Kanon Amane (Japanese); Kendell Byrd (English)
Blader and member of Team Gordius.
Iwao Gogo (轟轟イワオ, Gōgō Iwao)
Voiced by: Hiroki Yasumoto (Japanese); Brent Mukai (English)
Blader and member of Team Gordius and the butler of Karla.
Omega Shiroboshi (白星オメガ, Shiroboshi Omega)
Voiced by: Ami Koshimizu (Japanese); Misty Lee (English)
Blader and leader of Team Zodiac and Tenka's mother.
Lantz Roji (露地ランツ, Roji Rantsu)
Voiced by: Genki Muro (Japanese); Michael Mishkin (English)
Blader and member of Team Zodiac.
Million Mizu (三頭ミリオン, Mizu Mirion)
Voiced by: Mutsuki Iwanaka (Japanese); Matt Shipman (English)
Blader and member of Team Zodiac.
Yoko Kyubi (九尾ヨウコ, Kyūbi Yōko)
Voiced by: Toshiyuki Toyonaga (Japanese); Landon McDonald (English)
Blader and member of Team Misleaders.
Enga Fugazaru (腐飾ドクガ, Fushoku Dokuga)
Voiced by: Chiharu Shigematsu (Japanese); Adam McArthur (English)
Blader and member of Team Misleaders.
Ryu Isshin (一心リュウ, Isshin Ryū)
Voiced by: Kentarō Itō (Japanese); Kirk Thornton (English)
Blader and member of Team Misleaders.
Zero Cross (黒須ゼロ, Kurosu Zero)
Voiced by: Makoto Yasumura (Japanese); Patrick Seitz (English)
Blader and Jaxon's Father.
One Cross (黒須ワン, Kurosu Wan)
Voiced by: Taihi Kimura (Japanese); Mark Whitten (English)
Blader and Jaxon's Brother.
Two Cross (黒須ツー, Kurosu Tsu)
Voiced by: Farahnaz Nikray (Japanese); Ariana Nicole George (English)
Blader and Jaxon's Brother.
Three Cross & Four Cross (黒須スリー&黒須フォー, Kurosu Surī & Kurosu Fō)
Voiced by: Kikunosuke Toya (Three), Kanna Nakamura (Four) (Japanese); Hunter McCoy (Three), Suzie Yeung (Four) (English)
Blader and Jaxon's Twin Siblings.
Five Cross (黒須ファイブ, Kurosu Faibu)
Voiced by: Ayumu Murase (Japanese); Casey Mongillo (English)
Blader and Jaxon's Brother.
Six Cross (黒須シックス, Kurosu Shikkusu)
Voiced by: Kyōhei Natsume (Japanese); Aeric Azana (English)
Blader and Jaxon's Brother.
Seven Cross (黒須セブン, Kurosu Sebun)
Voiced by: Takako Tanaka (Japanese); Kayli Mills (English)
Blader and Jaxon's Sister.
Eight Cross (黒須エイト, Kurosu Eito)
Voiced by: Takahiro Hikami (Japanese); Ricco Fajardo (English)
Blader and Jaxon's Brother.

=== Other ===
Suzaki (スザキ, Suzaki)
Voiced by: Naoya Miyase (Japanese); Edward Mendoza (English)
Former member of Team Albatross.
Tsuru (ツル, Suru)
Voiced by: Himari Mochida (Japanese); Heather Gonzalez (English)
Former member of Team Albatross.
Ginro (銀狼, Ginrō)
Voiced by: Katsuyuki Konishi (Japanese); Justice Washington (English)
Blader and Jaxon's former blading master.
Kiwami Miyazukae (宮仕キワミ, Miyadzukae Kiwami)
Voiced by: Nozomi Sasaki (Japanese); Caitlin Rowe (English)
Blader and civil servant.

== Media ==
=== Manga ===
The Beyblade X manga is written by Homura Kawamoto and Hikaru Muno and illustrated by Posuka Demizu. It began serialization in CoroCoro Comic on May 15, 2023. In May 2024, Viz Media announced that they licensed the manga for English publication. Shogakukan Asia publishes an English version of the manga in Singapore.

No.	Original release date	Original ISBN	English release date	English ISBN
1	September 28, 2023	978-4-09-143648-1	January 14, 2025	978-1-9747-5261-4
01. "X" (X(エックス), Ekkusu); 02. "Rainbow" (七色, Nanairo); 03. "Bey Sponsor" (ベイスポンサー, Beisuponsā); 04. "Zooganic" (ズーガニック, Zūganikku)
2	January 26, 2024	978-4-09-143682-5	April 8, 2025	978-1-9747-5280-5
05. "Mask and the King" (仮面と獅子王, Kamen to Shishiō); 06. "Warden's Exam" (カドバーの試験, Kadobā no Shiken); 07. "Bey Timeshift" (ベイタイムシフト, Beitaimu Shifuto)
3	July 26, 2024	978-4-09-149747-5	July 8, 2025	978-1-9747-5518-9
08. "Proof of the Fastest" (最速の証明, Saisoku no Shōmei); 09. "A Rainbow Guest" (七色の来客, Nanairo no Raikyaku); 10. "Dream Contest" (夢の競演, Yume no Kyōen); 11. "Return of the Queen" (女王の帰還, Joō no Kikan)
4	October 28, 2024	978-4-09-149816-8	October 14, 2025	978-1-9747-5847-0
12. "The Other Mask" (もうひとつの仮面, Mōhitotsu no Kamen); 13. "Clash at the Top (Part 1)" (頂上決戦(1), Chōjō Kessen (1)); 14. "Clash at the Top (Part 2)" (頂上決戦(2), Chōjō Kessen (2)); 15. "Clash at the Top (Part 3)" (頂上決戦(3), Chōjō Kessen (3))
5	January 28, 2025	978-4-09-149877-9	January 13, 2026	978-1-9747-6127-2
16. "Shiroboshi Style" (白星流, Shiroboshi-ryū); 17. "Jaxon's Master" (エクスの師匠, Ekusu no Shishō); 18. "Star Battle" (白星決闘(スターバトル), Sutā Batoru)
6	June 27, 2025	978-4-09-154041-6	July 14, 2026	978-1-9747-6306-1
19. "The Curse" (呪い, Noroi); 20. "Forbidden Power" (禁断の力, Kindan no Chikara); 21. "Unimaginable Bey" (想像を絶するベイ, Sōzō o Zessuru Bei); 22. "Multi-Colored Battle" (七色の闘い, Nanairo no Tatakai); 23. "Messenger from the Super Summit" (超頂上からの使者, Chō Chōjō kara no Shisha); 24. "The Other Team" (もう一つのチーム, Mōhitotsu no Chīmu)
7	October 28, 2025	978-4-09-154086-7	October 13, 2026	978-1-9747-6674-1
25. "Mislead" (ミスリード, Misurīdo); 26. "Xtreme Battle (Part 1)" (超頂上決戦(エクストリームバトル)(1), Ekusutorīmu Batoru (1)); 27. "Xtreme Battle (Part 2)" (超頂上決戦(エクストリームバトル)(2), Ekusutorīmu Batoru (2)); 28. "Xtreme Battle (Part 3)" (超頂上決戦(エクストリームバトル)(3), Ekusutorīmu Batoru (3))
8	February 27, 2026	978-4-09-154137-6	January 12, 2027	978-1-9747-7217-9
29. Mirai no Bei (未来のベイ); 30. Futari de Hitotsu no Bei (2人でひとつのベイ); 31. "Chō Mirai" no Bei ("超未来" のベイ); 32. Jinrui Shijō Saikō (人類史上最高)
9	June 26, 2026	978-4-09-154284-7	April 13, 2027	—
33. Shin Ekkusu Tawā (真・Xタワーへ); 34. Ekusupando Burēdo (エクスパンドブレード); 35. Dai 2 no Shikaku (第2の刺客); 36. Shijō Saikō no Tatakai (史上最高の戦い)
10	October 28, 2026	978-4-09-154371-4	—	—
37. Tenpunosai (天賦の才); 38. Furu 4 X Bei Batoru (フル4Xベイバトル); 39. Shin chō Chōjō Kessen 1 (真・超頂上決戦 1); 40. Shin chō Chōjō Kessen 2 (真・超頂上決戦 2)

=== Anime ===
An anime television series adaptation was announced on May 14, 2023, by Takara Tomy. The anime is produced by OLM and directed by Moto Terada with Dai Fukuyama joining her starting from episode 101, and Katsuhito Akiyama supervising up until episode 100. The character designs are by Yoshihiro Nagamori with Kazuho Hyōdō handling series composition from episodes 1–39, and Hikaru Muno taking over the role starting from episode 38 with Kōji Bandai joining him starting from episode 75. The opening theme song is "Prove" performed by One Ok Rock, and the ending theme song is "Zoom Zoom" performed by Aespa. A second season was announced on September 13, 2024, and commenced on October 18, 2024. The opening theme was "You Gotta Run" by L'Arc-en-Ciel, and the ending theme was "Cosmic Treat" by Perfume. A new opening theme and ending theme was announced for the second season on March 21, 2025. The new opening theme is "Rise" by Tomorrow X Together and the new ending theme is "Stay Gold" by Ado and Jax Jones. A third season was announced on September 12, 2025, and commenced on October 24, 2025. The opening theme for the third season is "Invincible" by i-dle and the ending theme is "Vortex" by imase. After the airing of episode 122, the series stopped airing on TV Tokyo and moved to the Beyblade YouTube channel on April 17, 2026, with a two-episode premiere with the series moving to a biweekly schedule. A fourth season premiered on October 9, 2026. It also returned to a weekly schedule.

An English dub of the first season first premiered at Anime Expo at the Los Angeles Convention Center in Los Angeles, California on July 6, 2024 with a television premiere on Disney XD, DisneyNow and Hulu in the United States on July 13, 2024. An English dub of the second season premiered on Disney XD and DisneyNow in the United States on July 26, 2025.
