= Beyblade X: Xone =

2024 video game

- Official cover art
- Developer: GrooveBoxJapan
- Publisher: FuRyu
- Series: Beyblade X
- Platforms: Nintendo Switch; Windows
- Release: November 14, 2024
- Genre: Action game
- Modes: Single-player, Multiplayer

Beyblade X: Xone is an action game developed by GrooveBoxJapan and published by FuRyu. The game released on November 14, 2024, on Nintendo Switch and Windows worldwide. The game features both a single-player story mode and an online multiplayer mode. Online battles and local battles are available. However, players will not be able to do cross-platform battles between the Nintendo Switch and Steam platforms.

== Gameplay ==
In Beyblade X: Xone, the player learns battle fundamentals through an initial tutorial before entering matches where the objective is for their Beyblade to outlast an opponent by earning points based on how the opposing top is defeated; after launching a Beyblade into the stadium—its movement influenced by launch position—it moves automatically and takes damage upon collision, with each top possessing a spin gauge that drains over time and a burst gauge that measures how many hits it can withstand, awarding one point if the opponent stops spinning and two if it bursts. Attacks and counterattacks consume an active gauge, and repeated impacts fill an X gauge that triggers the X Phase, a rock‑paper‑scissors sequence in which winning inflicts heavy damage and can award three points along with a brief cutscene that varies depending on the Beyblade and move used. Outside battles, the player navigates The X Tower to speak with characters, customize or purchase Beyblades, and choose among attack, defense, and balance types, while exhibition battles accessed from a world map provide points used to strengthen Beyblades but immediately begin upon selecting a location. The game also includes online play with casual, ranked, and custom modes, allowing the player to select three Beyblades from their save file for competitive matches.

== Plot ==
Preview of the story

The game is based on the Beyblade X anime. However, the game's story is completely original and also includes original characters. The player will get to choose between a male and female protagonist. The protagonist will then inherit the Beyblade Shinobi Knife from his or her father. The protagonist will then meet the members and the founder of Team Persona. (Note: Seen in the image above)

== Development ==
The game was announced on May 14, 2024. People who purchase the physical copy will receive a special Beyblade "Shinobi Knife 4-60LF Metal Coat: Blue". An English version was also announced to be in development. On November 6, 2025, Crunchyroll Games announced that they would add the game to their Game Vault subscription service on Android and iOS devices. The port launched on February 27, 2026.

== Reception ==
Reception

Review scores
Publication	Score
Siliconera	7/10
Multiplayer.it	6.5/10

Siliconera recommended the game to who keep up to date with the franchise.
