= BeyWarriors: BeyRaiderz =

Anime television series

- Created by: Shinzo Fujita
- Anime television series
- Directed by: Kunihisa Sugishima
- Produced by: Mamiko Aoki
- Written by: Shinzo Fujita
- Music by: Terry Tompkins; Steve D'Angelo; Jeffrey D. Morrow
- Studio: SynergySP, d-rights
- Licensed by: NA: Nelvana
- Original network: YTV
- English network: AU: Eleven; US: Cartoon Network
- Original run: January 4, 2014 – March 29, 2014
- Episodes: 13
- Related works
- Beyblade; Beyblade: Metal Fusion; BeyWheelz; BeyWarriors: Cyborg; Beyblade Burst; Beyblade X

BeyWarriors: BeyRaiderz is an anime series, a spin-off of the series Beyblade. While it has been produced in Japan, it has yet to be aired in Japanese. BeyRaiderz has been commissioned by Nelvana to act as a solo series consisting of 13-episodes. The series was originally announced as BeyRaiderz: Shogun, but has since been renamed BeyWarriors: BeyRaiderz. The series acts as a continuation to BeyWheelz as it continues to follow the story of Sho, Jin, and Leon.

== Plot ==
In an unknown land, six guardian beasts provide protection and help cities to thrive through battles called BeyRaiderz. An unknown evil arises to take on the six guardian figures, forcing the six to unite. At the end of the battle the land is protected, but the guardians fall into a slumber. This allows many natural disasters to occur, causing the land to lose its beauty and the people to forget about BeyRaiderz battles. As the six guardian beasts begin to awaken, they call on six BeyWarriors from other lands. The six BeyWarriors are each given BeyRaiderz and charged with going from coliseum arena to coliseum arena to battle. Battling enough times will allow the spirits to reawaken, and it can't happen soon enough as the same darkness that caused them to unite is reawakening and threatens to destroy the world once more.

== Characters ==
- Sho Tenma is the protagonist of the show. He is a light-hearted and friendly person and is the first BeyWarrior that Rachel and Jimmy meet. Sho always looks at the bright side and might appear a little carefree, but in battles his true, seemingly endless potential comes to the surface. He is voiced by Christopher Jacot.
- Jin Ryu is Sho's best friend. He is a silent and level-headed character who has a strong sense of sportsmanship. He takes everything very seriously and functions as a voice of reason for his friends. Jin also possesses the ability to break through solid rock. He is voiced by Austin Di Iulio.
- Leon Fierce is the last of Sho's original friends. He appears rough and a little rude, but once you get to know him he turns out to be a very caring person. Leon has a bad temper that tends to get in his way, but despite that he has a unique way of treating others. He tends to be a good mentor but is also the last one to trust someone. He is voiced by Zachary Bennett.
- Armes Navy is a BeyWarrior like Sho and his friends. Not much is currently known about Armes, but he doesn't appear to take friendship easily and seems to be a loner. He is voiced by Terry McGurrin.
- Ricky Gills is a very outgoing person. He's always the first one to look for a way to help someone in trouble, and he wants to be everyone's friend. He seems a little gullible to the forces of darkness. He is voiced by Scott Gorman.
- Task Landau is a man who is constantly watching Sho and his friends. He is the last of the chosen BeyRaiderz, but his main mission is to evaluate each individuals strengths for the mysterious Kaiser Gray. He is voiced by Ryan Cooley.
- Rachel Cruz is a young girl who has a mysterious compass mirror that guides her to each coliseum and allows her to see if a mythic beast BeyRaiderz is near. She is later revealed to be a descendant of Tempest, who seeks to undo her ancestor's wrongdoings. She is voiced by Shannon Hamilton.
- Jimmy Cruz is Rachel's little brother. He knows of the legend of the six mythic beasts and believes they will bring prosperity back to the land. He is a good cook and joins Rachel along her journey to help guide the six BeyRaiderz back to full strength. He is later revealed to be a descendant of Tempest, seeking to undo his ancestor's misdeeds. He is voiced by Jacob Ewaniuk.
- Kaiser Gray/Flame first appears in the series as an eyeball. He has sent Task out to evaluate each BeyRaiderz individual strengths. He is later revealed to be the Hero Flame, who was given immortality by the Mythic Beasts and allowed to live in the Sacred Garden with them. After defeating Tempest and stopping his quest to take over the world, he was put to sleep just like the Mythic Beasts. When they are resurrected, he too is resurrected, but also mysteriously becomes corrupted. He is voiced by Brian Froud.
- Tempest is a legendary blader who was defeated by the Hero Flame shortly before the Mythic Beasts went to sleep. It is stated that his misdeeds had caused great misfortune to his family. He only appears in flashbacks throughout the series and is later revealed to be the ancestor of Rachel and Jimmy Cruz, who desire to undo Tempest's wrongdoings. He is voiced by Dan Petronijevic.
- Domani is a young digger who finds lost artifacts depicting the six legendary beasts. He is the first boy that Sho meets in the new world. He is voiced by Cory Doran. He is seen in episodes 1, 12, and 13.
- Klaus is one of Domani's friends. He's the one who found the tunnel where they hide their artifacts that leads to the first cities coliseum arena. He is voiced by Nathan Stephenson. He is seen in episodes 1 and 13.
- Morgen is Domani's other friend that tries to trick Sho into traps in the first city. He is voiced by James Hartnett. He is seen in episodes 1 and 13.
- Holly is a young girl who has lost her grandmother in the forest near an old city. Only she and her grandmother live in the region. She is found and is protected by Jin until her grandmother can be found. She is voiced by Sophia Ewaniuk. Her appearance is in episode 3.
- Grandmother is Holly's grandmother in the forest. While out gathering some herbs she falls off the path and gets separated from Holly. She tries to reunite with Holly, but a sprained ankle keeps her from walking. She is voiced by Jane Luk. Her appearance is in episode 3.
- The Narrator retells the action of the previous episode and also voices the next time preview. He is also voiced by Dan Petronijevic. While the narrator is voiced by the same voice actor who acted as Blader DJ in the Beyblade Metal Saga, it is NOT Blader DJ that provides the recaps for each episode.
- Treasure Hunter Bison is one of the four adults shown in this series. He is searching for hidden treasure by traveling from region to region. He believes the treasure he seeks will lead the world, and more importantly himself, to prosperity. He isn't afraid to set up traps to keep his prey from finding the treasure he seeks. Little does he realize all he has come across are battle arenas and that his biggest aid will be in helping the BeyWarriors awaken their beasts. He appears in episodes 5,12 and 13.
- Atsushi is a young man that asks Jin to teach him to break boulders. While Jin does refuse his request, he does teach Atsushi a valuable lesson about true strength. He appears in episodes 6, 12, and 13.
- Moot, Raizon, and Andre are three young boys that are best friends. They appear in episodes 8 and 13 of the series. The three boys have left their home village due to famine and drought, but they promised each other they would return in one years time to help dig a well and make the village successful again. When they return none of them has succeeded with their dreams. Now the BeyWarriors must help them realize telling the truth and trying with all your strength is the best way to be successful, even if it means a lot of hard work is in store.

== Episode list ==
All, but episode 4, premiered on YTV in Canada. Cartoon Network acted as the premiere station for episode 4 after airing a 4-episode marathon January 25. However CN began airing the series in its normal slot of 8 AM with episode 1 on February 1 while YTV premiered episode 5 that day, allowing YTV to act as the premiere station for all but episode 4. As YTV airs the English version of the dub, the First English Air Dates listed are for the YTV airings.

No.	Title	English airdate
1	"Hope"	January 4, 2014
Two mysterious figures are battling with BeyRaiderz. Upon claiming the final token, one of the BeyRaiderz is able to summon all six legendary beasts. The other uses some sort of darkness power to drive the six warriors into slumber and separate them across the world. Years pass, and the beasts begin to awaken. They call on six BeyWarriors from other worlds to take up the mission of going to battlefields and restoring their powers through BeyRaiderz battes. Sho arrives at the first city where he is met by the young boy, Domani. Domani thinks Sho is there to steal his treasure, so he gathers two friends, Klaus and Morgen, and the three try to ambush Sho. Upon seeing Sho's Samurai Ifrit, they realize he is a figure that could become a friend. Their nerves are calmed when Rachel and Jimmy Cruz arrive. Rachel swears she will become Sho's guide to each BeyRaiderz Coliseum Arena. The three boys lead the trio to the cities lost coliseum, but they are followed by Armes Navy. Armes and Sho battle to power up their beasts. Sho wins the battle, but Armes leaves instead of joining him on his quest. Sho then follows Rachel and Jimmy outside the city.
2	"Friends"	January 11, 2014
Rachel and Jimmy tell Sho the past history of the mythic beasts. Sho reveals that Samurai Ifrit has shown him a vision that confirms their tale. The three head to the next city, where Sho senses he is being followed. He takes off chasing a figure, who ends up being Ricky Gills. Ricky reveals he has no intent to do anything but battle as a BeyRaiderz. Upon learning Sho is also a BeyRaiderz Ricky issues a BeyWarrior challenge, so the two head for the lost coliseum arena. Rachel and Jimmy have already arrived at the coliseum arena, where they find Leon Fierce waiting in the Shadows. Leon challenges them to a battle and is convinced they are spies (unaware that they're not BeyWarriors) until Sho arrives. Sho confirms they are good, so Leon decides to trust the two. He challenges Sho to a battle, but Ricky says he was their first and should get first shot. Sho decides let Ricky battle Leon. Leon wins the battle with some help from the collapsing arena.
3	"Reunion"	January 18, 2014
The episode begins with the group at another coliseum arena. Sho and Ricky are battling, and Sho wins. Rachel reveals that Samurai Ifrit has powered up more than any of the others, but it's still not enough to bring him out of slumber. Sho senses he's being watched, and the others wonder what's going on. The group heads toward the next city, in a forest where no one now lives. There Sho once again senses he's being watched. He takes off in the direction of the individual and runs head on into Jin. Jin knocks them to the ground and reveals he wasn't chasing any of them. Instead he was helping a young girl find her missing Grandmother. Sho, Leon, and Ricky decide to join Jin in the search while the young girl, Holly, stays with Rachel and Jimmy. A fork in the road causes the group to have to split up and leads Sho and Jin to the coliseum arena. Both Sho and Jin sense the mysterious figure again and attack. The sixth BeyRaiderz is revealed in the form of Task Landow. Now that they've uncovered him, Task won't let Sho and Jin leave. Jin battles Task so the two can leave while he powers up Ronin Dragoon. Little does he realize Task's true mission is to evaluate each BeyRaiderz strength and report it to Kaiser Gray. Leon and Ricky find the Grandmother and return her to Rachel, Jimmy, and Holly where they learn of the battle taking place.
4	"Challenge"	January 25, 2014
Kaiser Gray sends Task out to learn the strength of Armes. The BeyWarriors approach a windy valley where three arenas are said to exist. The group divides into groups of two- Sho w/ Rachel, Jin w/ Jimmy, and Leon w/ Ricky. They each take one of three paths they believe leads to an arena. Before dividing on the paths, Rachel tells everyone the legend of the Secret Garden that the six mythic beasts once lived in. She believes bringing back the Secret Garden will bring back prosperity to the land. Jin, Jimmy, Leon, and Ricky arrive at the end of their paths only to find two unusable arenas. In a cave the floor begins to collapse, and Sho and Rachel are saved by Armes. Armes leads Sho and Rachel to the final arena. Sho tries to convince Armes to join them, but when Armes refuses Task intervenes and battles Armes. After the battle Task announces that all the BeyRaiderz powers will soon go to Master Gray. Rachel's face turns pail as she utters the name in horror- Kaiser Gray. Kaiser Gray entrusts Task with the task of recruiting Armes to join their side.
5	"Treasure"	February 1, 2014
The BeyWarriors discuss if Armes words mean he will never join them or if his desire to gain additional strength will lead them to join forces. When Ricky brings up the mysterious Kaiser, Jimmy changes the subject to dinner, almost as though he and Rachel are hiding something about Kaiser Gray. The next day the 4 BeyWarriors approach a mountain coliseum where they encounter a series of traps. They meet the Treasure Hunter Bison and learn that Bison is searching for six Golden Statues that are shaped after the mystic Guardians. After the group makes it through a series of traps, they convince Bison to lead them to the coliseum. Upon opening the coliseum six Golden Statues aren't found, but a team battle coliseum is in place. Sho and Leon team up to take on Jin and Jimmy in a coliseum where 9 tokens are present. After each BeyWarrior gets one token, tactics are changed where Sho battles Jin in a battle of speed while Jimmy and Leon battle to keep the others from getting the tokens. Sho and Jin each manage to get one more token, giving each team 3, but when Jin's BeyRaiderz flips over and becomes unable to battle, it allows Leon to keep Jimmy distracted while Sho collects the other two tokens with ease. With the team battle completed, both Samurai Ifrit and Berserker Byakko are released. Bison learns that the hope of the world lies with these six BeyWarriors and decides to stop searching for any future treasure. Instead of returning to his BeyRaiderz, Samurai Ifrit becomes a guiding light that can only make things easier or harder for the others in the future.
6	"Confrontation"	February 8, 2014
Sho and his friends learn that the guiding light will lead them to the Sacred Garden. However all six Mythic Beasts must have their guiding lights activated before the location of the Sacred Garden will be revealed. On the way to the next arena, the group comes upon a young man named Atsushi. Atsushi asks to become Jin's student after seeing Jin smash a stone. Jin refuses to teach him, saying he doesn't have the time because it will take more than a day to learn his technique. Atsushi reveals that a gang of thugs has attacked their crops, and one of his friends blurted out he could smash a stone, so that's why he wants to learn. Jin teaches him it's more powerful to be honest than to try to learn something. Atsushi agrees to lead the group to the arena, but what he doesn't know is the group of thugs is looking for him. Jin and Leon invite them to come watch a BeyRaiderz battle instead of watching the stone be smashed. Jin and Leon compete at an active volcano's arena. 5 tokens are available. During the battle Jin saves Leon from a set of flames, but then he jumps on Leon and makes him stop spinning, allowing Jin to win. Ronin Dragoon turns into the second guiding light, and the group leaves for the third location. After the battle the scene shifts to Armes who has found another arena. Task reaches the same location, and the two agree to battle at this new arena as the episode ends.
7	"Legend"	February 15, 2014
Task and Armes hold a BeyRaiderz battle with Armes winning and evening up their series 1-1. Task tells Armes if he wants to learn the truth, he should head to a specific mountain range where the legend of the BeyRaiderz is shown. Sho and company are on this same mountain. Sho gets injured while protecting Rachel from an avalanche. Jimmy and Rachel reveal the legend of two previous undefeated BeyWarriors- the Hero Flame and Master Tempest. The Hero Flame is the only BeyWarrior that has ever been allowed to live in the Sacred Garden. The first battle shown in the series is revealed to have been the battle between Flame and Tempest, with Flame hoping to bring the world to prosperity. Armes hears the story but then comes out and challenges Sho to a BeyRaiderz battle. With Sho being injured, Jimmy steps in and battles at an ice arena with 5 tokens and chopping obstacles. Armes ends up winning the battle after Jimmy's BeyRaiderz gets stuck in an avalanche of ice. Guardian Leviathan earns the power and then turns into a guiding light. Instead of joining Sho and company, Armes joins Task and decides to meet Kaiser Gray.
8	"Homesick"	February 22, 2014
Task introduces Armes to Kaiser Gray. Armes realizes Kaiser Gray has a tie with the mythic beasts and decides to help him be resurrected. Leon and Ricky battle with Leon's Mythic beast awakening. While searching for the next town, Ricky goes off on his own to try and awaken his beast. Instead of finding the arena, he finds three boys: Moot, Raizon, and Andre. The three boys left trying to become wealthy so they could return to the village and doing a well. Instead of being successful they all failed and deceived each other. Ricky plays along with Moot at first, but eventually he proves that the only way to be successful is by being honest and trying your hardest. A tag-team battle is held with Sho and Ricky facing Leon and Jin. After gaining a 2-1 token lead, Sho's BeyRaiderz is stopped leaving Ricky to face the other two by himself. Ricky manages to gain the last token, and his mythic beast awakens. The BeyRaiderz promise to bring wealth and prosperity back to the land, and the 3 boys decide to head off and try to be successful again.
9	"Paradise"	March 1, 2014
5 guiding lights have appeared. Rachel opens up her compass, and shortly thereafter Task's beast turns into a guiding light. Rachel's mirror leads all 6 BeyWarriors to the Secret Garden's entrance, and her compass opens the doors to the Secret Garden. Task reveals that in order for the Mythic Beasts to be revived, three arena battles must take place in the Garden. Whichever side wins will claim the Master Token and is able to resurrect two beasts at a time. Leon & Ricky battle Task & Armes for the first Master Token. Rachel and Jimmy dodge questions about Kaiser Gray, who appears to be in the Garden and is watching the battles.
10	"Revival"	March 8, 2014
Jin battles Task for the right to gain the second Master Token. Task hits rocks intentionally to trick Jin into getting trapped. Two more mythic beasts are resurrected. Kaiser Gray reveals he can control the six mythic beasts and reveals Jimmy and Rachel know more than they've been sharing.
11	"Collision"	March 15, 2014
Sho battles Armes for the right to gain the final Master Token. After the final two beasts are resurrected, Armes reveals Kaiser Gray is the Hero Flame (who has been turned evil after he fought against Tempest). Armes challenges Flame to a battle to figure out who is truly the top BeyRaiderz battler. Flame reveals he has the seventh BeyRaiderz.
12	"Truth"	March 22, 2014
Armes battles Flame in the new arena created by the six Mythic beasts. Flame reveals his BeyRaiderz is an earlier version of Ifrit that has the ability to use all the powers of each Mythic Beast. When Armes gains the fifth and final token, he has the Mythic Beasts create a storm that throws Armes' BeyRaiderz out of the arena and gives him the win. Flame then reveals Jimmy and Rachel are descendants of Tempest, who have been trying to undo their ancestor's wrongdoings. He locks them and all six BeyWarriors away, including Task, believing they will become a threat to his rule. Flame then announces the resurrection of the Mythic Beasts to the world and commands the people to come to him at the Sacred Garden. The light of each BeyRaiderz begins to glow mysteriously in the prison as Sho and his friends, now joined by Armes, attempt to escape. Meanwhile all the people of the world head toward the Sacred Garden.
13	"Final Battle"	March 29, 2014
Kaiser Gray brings the people into the Sacred Garden and restores it in front of their eyes. The people think Kaiser will keep them all safe. In the dungeons the spirits of the Mythic Beasts help Sho and the others escape. While heading towards the exit, Sho and the others find Task and free him. Task joins them. The six BeyWarriors arrive and tell the people the truth about Kaiser, but the people side with Kaiser, except for Sho's friends. They decide to settle things through a BeyRaiderz battle. Sho is chosen to represent all the Bladers against Flame. The arena has 7 tokens. Kaiser appears to have it won when he looks to be headed towards a 3-1 token lead, but Sho steals a token to even it up at 2-2. Kaiser quickly claims his 3rd token and releases the power of the Six Mythic Beasts against Sho. Surprisingly Sho's Ifrit recovers from the stratosphere blow and evens it up at 3 tokens a piece. The hearts of the people turn against Flame after seeing the sneak attack, and the Mythic Beasts also turn against him. Sho and Flame battle for the final token that ends with Sho winning and Kaiser leaves the world permanently. With the Mythic Beasts freed, the world begins to recover and Sho and his friends proceed to challenge the others for a BeyRaiderz battle.
