= BeyWheelz =

Canadian-Japanese anime television program

- Series key visual.
- Created by: Katsumi Hasegawa
- Anime television series
- Directed by: Naoki Hishikawa
- Produced by: Mamiko Aoki
- Written by: Katsumi Hasegawa; Masashi Kubota
- Music by: Hiroki Matsuoka
- Studio: SynergySP; Nelvana Animation
- Licensed by: NA: Nelvana Animation
- Original network: YTV
- English network: AU: Eleven; SEA: Cartoon Network; US: Cartoon Network
- Original run: August 11, 2012 – October 6, 2012
- Episodes: 13
- Related works
- Beyblade; Beyblade: Metal Fusion; BeyWarriors: BeyRaiderz; BeyWarriors: Cyborg; Beyblade Burst; Beyblade X

BeyWheelz is an anime series, a spin-off of the series Beyblade. While produced in Japan, the series has yet to be aired in Japanese. Originally commissioned by Nelvana to make up for Beyblade: Metal Fury's shortened season, BeyWheelz is a series of 13 episodes, which is set in an independent continuity. The series is followed by BeyWarriors: BeyRaiderz, which acts as a continuation story for Sho, Jin, and Leon.

== Plot ==
The series follows Team Estrella, a group of young and talented Beywheelers residing at Destection City. The peace of that place is threatened when a group of aggressive wheelers calling themselves Dominators attempts to take over the Beywheelz world. Unable to accept such a reign of terror, Team Estrella opposes the Dominators and ends up fighting them in the Judgement Bey tournament, which is to decide the fate of the world they live in, as well as the fate of an unknown, undiscovered one.

== Characters ==
- Sho Tenma (voiced by Christopher Jacot in English and Kaito Ishikawa in Japanese) is the protagonist of the show and a light-hearted and friendly person and the leader of Team Estrella. Sho always looks at the bright side and might appear a little carefree, but in battles his true, seemingly endless potential comes to the surface. Sho is renowned as the BeyWheelz World Champion.
- Jin Ryu (voiced by Austin Di Iulio) is Sho's best friend and one of the founding members of Team Estrella. He is a silent and level-headed character who has a strong sense of sportsmanship. He takes everything very seriously and functions as a voice of reason for his friends.
- Leon Fierce (voiced by Zachary Bennett and Takumu Shinohara in Japanese) is the last founding member of Team Estrella. He appears rough, a little rude, and has a bad temper that tends to get in his way, but once you get to know him, he turns out to be a very caring person and a good mentor, despite his unique way of treating others.
- Covey Horn (voiced by Scott Beaudin) used to be known as the Strong Armed Outlaw, who battled any opponent mercilessly. Due to the kind influence of a boy called Antonio he changed and became a much kinder person. Covey is strong and honest, but he can be a bit naive. He strongly admires Leon and follows him around everywhere.
- Marche Ovis (voiced by Ashley Botting) is a computer genius and a very analytic person. With his computer, he can perform in-depth analysis on beybattles. He is close friends with Nicole, even though he is often exasperated by her straightforward nature. They build a tag team. He is also called the Racing CPU.
- Nicole Spears (voiced by Ashley Botting) is an outgoing and very self-confident girl. She doesn't hesitate to say what she thinks and is never one to shy down from a challenge. While at first she preferred to work alone, she now is a team with her friend Marche. Yet she often acts disapproving of over-analyzing and prefers taking impulsive action by far.
- Ryan Glastone (voiced by Andrew Sabiston) is the true leader of the Dominators and the chairman of the wheeling support organisation DREAM. An accident in his past prevents him from wheeling again, which is why he created to Judgement Bey to find a strong replacement. It was him who made Beywheelz as popular as it is by the time of the plot. He is obsessed with the idea of going to the New World and ruling over it. Ryan is a twisted character who cannot understand the ideals of friendship and fighting spirit or even the feelings of other people. He seems to find genuine amusement in whatever he does.
- Odin (voiced by Jonathan Wilson) is the leader of the Dominators. He is silent and unwilling to get closer to anybody. Filling the "emptiness in his heart" is his highest priority. After he battles Sho, he finds his wish fulfilled and decides to try to make friends by joining Team Estrella in the final battle.
- Glen (voiced by Jason Deline) is the Number 2 of the Dominators and a hot-headed, merciless fighter. The thing he cares most about is strength. He is ruthless and really likes fire.
- Jake (voiced by Will Bowes) may appear like a playful individualist who can't get serious, but in truth he is a real sadist. Most often he is seen smiling and joking, but more than anything he enjoys seeing other people suffer. Jake is extremely expressive and talkative.
- Sting (voiced by Kris Ferguson) is a rather mysterious Wheeler who rarely talks outside of battles. He's known for using unfair tactics. In fights, he is prone to cruelty. After being punished for losing in Judgement Bey his mental instability increases greatly.
- David (voiced by Lou Attia) is Gigante's older brother and a very withdrawn person. He seems to be annoyed with everything happening around him and only becomes expressive when he is in a fight. While he once truly cared for his brother, David has become damaged by the hard Dominator training. Nowadays he only cares about becoming the strongest. While he realizes the inhumanity of his team, even against its own members, he sees no other way for himself than to remain a part of it.
- Gigante (voiced by Clé Bennett) is David's younger brother and on first sight he appears very intimidating. However, he is not as corrupted as his teammates and in truth all he dreams of is having fun together with his brother. David's personality change hurts him, but Gigante has not given up on a better future for the two of them. In the final battle, he rejoins Team Estrella and presumed to be reconciled with his older brother in the aftermath.
- Mathew Kendrick (voiced by Julian DeZotti) is a mysterious person who works as Ryan's secretary. He has trained the Dominators personally and is very devoted to Ryan's ideals.
- Lucy McClain (voiced by Linda Ballantyne) is Ryan's other secretary and just as mysterious as her partner. In her civilian role she always appears composed and matter-of-factly but as Matthew, she shows a more aggressively strict and conceited side. She, too, has trained the Dominators.
- DJ (voiced by Brian West) is the announcer of Destection City, who will come to any battle held in the area and comment in his cheery and lively style.
- Ken (voiced by Nathan Stephenson) is a local BeyWheelz fighter that wants to join Team Estrella. He's one of the first individuals to be attacked by The Dominators.
- George (voiced by James Hartnett) is another local BeyWheelz fighter that is friends with Ken and gets attacked by the Dominators.
- Tom (voiced by Cory Doran) is the youngest BeyWheelz fighter shown in the series. Since he's just learning how to battle when The Dominators attack, he is sent to get Team Estrella to ask for their help.
- Ringside (voiced by Milton Barnes) is the Das Vegas equivalent to the DJ, who comments on the BeyWheelz Grand Prix.
- Narrator (voiced by Garth Naumoff) opens each episode by telling the history of how BeyWheelz were created.

== Episode list ==
| No. | Title | English airdate |
|---|---|---|
| 1 | "New Generation!" | August 11, 2012 |
The Beywheelz world championship final match takes place between Sho Tenma and Jin Ryu. With encouragement from the number 3 wheeler, Leon Fierce, Sho defeats Jin to become the number 1 wheeler. It is revealed that all three are members of Team Estrella, and that their team has dominated the world championship for the last few years. Meanwhile a mysterious group watches from the shadows and decide that it is now time to reveal themselves to the world.
| 2 | "The Dominators Attack!" | August 11, 2012 |
After Sho has won the Beywheelz world championship, everyone wants to battle with team Estrella. Leon sends everyone off to face challenges to prove themselves worthy. While this is happening, a mysterious gang called the Dominators attacks the kids, threatening to destroy their beys. Luckily, Team Estrella arrives and battles the Dominators. Estrella comes out on top, but the Dominators swear Sho, Jin and Leon will be destroyed eventually.
| 3 | "The Fateful Tag-Team Battle!" | August 18, 2012 |
The Dominators continue to harass the Wheelers of the city in order to seize control of all of BeyWheelz. Only Team Estrella is able to challenge their rule, as Sho, Leon and Jin help to secure Wheelers safety against the Dominators. Wheelers everywhere around the city now fear The Dominators, who only wish to control the entire BeyWheelz world and frighten everyone with their power. Jin and Sho head to DREAM headquarters to speak with Chairmen Ryan concerning the Dominators attacks. Ryan tells them that they are totally mysterious and that even their Beys have never been seen before. It is there that the Co-Commanders of the Dominators announce themselves over a broadcast at DREAM HQ; they wish to hold a BeyWheelz battle against DREAM in order to take control of it. Sho then decides that Team Estrella will fight as DREAM's representatives against the Dominators in order to gain freedom for Wheelers everywhere. Sho and Jin head towards the location given by the Dominators, there they are met by the Dominators' top two Wheelers, Glen and Odin. They battle in a two versus two tag team match cliff side, in an absolute defeat match. Sho and Jin struggle against Glen and Odin's unique abilities within their Beys, the match is broadcast across the city as Wheelers including Leon rally to cheer Team Estrella on. As the battle rages on, Team Estrella plans to end it with their special moves, but the duo of Odin and Glen use the underhanded tactic of collapsing the stadium on top of both Jin and Sho's Beys. Jin saves his Bey in time, but costs them the match due to disqualification. Odin and Glen also attack and defeat Sho's Pegasus, giving the Dominators the win. Even though the Dominators came out on top, Sho refuses to allow them to take over DREAM, demanding that the Dominators win fairly in a rematch. The Dominators then propose a formal tournament of 5 on 5 including a tag team match.
| 4 | "The Wheeler of the Wilderness!" | August 18, 2012 |
On the search for more team members to fill the three empty spots on Estrella, Leon travels to Sant Miguel, a city in the wastelands. It is rumoured that a strong and aggressive wheeler nicknamed 'Strong Armed Outlaw' is going around there. In fact, a gym has only recently been destroyed and both Leon and gym member Covey Horn head to track down the culprit, who reveals himself to be Jake of the Dominators. Covey then decides to battle Jake for the honor of his comrades, while forcing Leon to be somewhat of a judge. Covey uses his great strength to try and simply overpower Jake, but Jake's slithery tactics are able to outmaneuver Covey's Bull at every turn. Finally, Jake finishes off Covey with his special move, Poison Bite, proving Covey no match for the Dominators wrath. Jake tries to continue to destroy Bull, but is stopped by Leon's Wheel, Leone. Leon challenges him to a battle at sunset. In the time left until then, Covey mourns over the gym and shares the story of his past with Leon. Covey was originally a Wheeler looking to pick a fight just for a battle, defeating everyone he came across in an out of control rage until he came to West Gym. There he was defeated by a Wheeler named Antonio, who showed Covey kindness and got him accepted into the community, making West Gym Covey's home. This is where Leon learns that Covey is the Strong Armed Outlaw, and tells him of the battles to come with the Dominators. The time frame has passed and Leon moves on to battle Jake, raising the stakes to where the loser is exiled from Sand Miguel forever. Once again Jake is able to outmaneuver brute force using Serpent's abilities, but Leon is not moved by Jake's skills, rather he is infuriated by Jake's underhandedness. Even in fury, Leon is still one step behind Jake who continues to barrage Leone without mercy and nearly knocks it out of the stadium, with his special move. However, Leon was waiting for this moment to set up for his own special move and turn Jake's tactics on him, defeating him with the attack and expelling him from the town. Leon leaves town, but not without Covey following close behind, hoping to become strong under Leon so he can protect what he loves, just as Leon did on that day.
| 5 | "Race! The Beywheelz Grand Prix!" | August 25, 2012 |
While searching for new members for Team Estrella in Das Vegas, Sho and Jin visit one of the main tourist attractions, The BeyWheelz Grand Prix. Two kids, a boy named Marche and a girl named Nicole win the Grand Prix. While Sho considers them great wheelers, Jin is not impressed with the concept of Beywheelz races. Marche and Nicole overhear them and try to convince Jin that it takes a lot of talent to win a BeyWheelz Grand Prix. When Jin doesn't agree they challenge him and Sho to battle them in a Grand Prix which they accept. When the contest begins Marche and Nicole struggle against the power of Pegasus and Drago but then they begin to cooperate and create trouble for Sho and Jin. They both battle valiantly but in the end they lose. Jin admits that a Grand Prix is a challenging battle and it takes real talent to win one. Together Sho and Jin ask them to join Team Estrella which they gladly accept.
| 6 | "Judgment Bey Begins!" | August 25, 2012 |
The battle of the Dominators and Team Estrella begins. Covey volunteers to be in the first match. Odin chooses Sting and Scorpio to go first. Everyone in the dome is cheering for Estrella, while the Dominators have no supporters in the crowd. DJ says the stadiums will be randomly picked by computers. Sting and Covey get a crash arena, with sand and cacti with metal spikes at the bottom of the jump. Covey's Bull is a heavy Power type while Sting's Scorpio is a light Speed type. Sting has the advantage and the battle seems to be one sided. Tables turn when Covey uses observations he made earlier today to develop a new technique and send Scorpio flying. The battle is decided when Scorpio gets stuck on a cactus' needle. Hereby, Estrella wins the first match.
| 7 | "The Law of the Dominators!" | September 1, 2012 |
After Covey's victory, DJ announces that the next round will be a tag-team battle. In the rest period between rounds the Dominators brutally punish Sting and his Scorpio for losing the first match. Gigante is brought to the room to witness Sting's punishment and to warn him that a loss in the next round would not be tolerated. Estrella's team of Nicole with Striker and Marche with Aries is sent to compete with the Dominator's brother team of David with Herculeo and Gigante with Gil. The random course selector chooses an oval stadium that at first appears to give an advantage to Estrella's team, but a water hazard that appears after five minutes proves to favor the Dominators. In the end David sacrifices his younger brother's bey in order to win the match, leaving the audience in shock and his brother heartbroken. The second match thereby goes to the Dominators.
| 8 | "Avenger on the Ice" | September 1, 2012 |
An innocent conversation between the older and newer members of Team Estrella reveals the reason Leon is the only one to never have won a World Championship. He has a bad temper issue causing him to lose control over himself in crucial situations. This is a source of great annoyance and shame to Leon who is now to battle Jake in the 3rd round on an ice field. Once again, Estrella seems to have an advantage at first, but the opposite turns out to be case. Event though Leon finally gains control of his temper, the melting of the ice field gets Leone stuck and brings Jake the victory. Leon and his Wild Mane Leone are defeated.
| 9 | "Phoenix vs. The White Dragon" | September 8, 2012 |
Jin and Glen battle in the fourth round in a stadium with flaming geysers. Glen and Raging Molten Fireblaze pit Jin and Doom Fire Drago in a corner, but Jin manages to figure out the pattern of the geysers and seems to win the upper hand. Nicole, Marche, Covey suspect that the stadiums are not actually randomized and head to investigate the stadium basement where their suspiciouns are validated. They get discovered by Leader A and B who challenge them to a battle and also destroy the controls of the geysers, messing Jin's plan up. While Leon rescues his teammates in the basement, Jin overcomes this new challenge and wins the match, taking away heavy burns.
| 10 | "Fierce Fight! A Battle of the Spirit" | September 8, 2012 |
After Jin won against Glen, who now gets punished alike to Sting earlier, the final battle of Sho Tenma and Odin has arrived. Beforehand Odin's backstory is revealed: because he always has an easy time winning, Odin has lost the feeling of getting fired up in a battle. The mysterious leader of the Dominators promised him to fill the emptiness in his heart, which is why Odin ultimately ended up joining the team. For this present battle, Odin insists on a normal stadium that gives him no advantage. An electric wall preventing stadium outs is the only addition made. While early in the battle, the speed of Odin's Destroyer seems to be giving him a huge advantage, Sho refuses to lose this easily. The longer they fight, the more fired up Sho seems to become. Odin's hand starts trembling as Sho is giving him some trouble. Odin realizes what a real battle is - a competition that pushes both Wheelers to their limits. Both Wheelers decide to use full power on each other. Now all of the audience are cheering for Show and Odin both. Finally, both use their special move, causing an explosion that destroys a huge part of the stadium. The bey still spinning afterwards turns out to be Pegasus. The winner of Judgement Bey is Team Estrella with 3 matches won. Sho walks over to Odin and offers his hand out for a hand shake. Odin is about to shake back, when Leader A and B appear. They announce that their fight with the Dominators is now over. Leader A and B take their masks off and they are revealed to be Ryan Gladstone's 2 assistants - Lucy and Mathew. Ryan enters the scene as well and congratulates team Estrella for winning Judgement Bey and then suddenly exclaims that Show, Jin, Leon, Covey, Marche, and Nicole are the newest members of the Dominators.
| 11 | "The Shocking Truth" | September 22, 2012 |
Ryan Gladstone finally reveals himself to be both the head of DREAM and the Dominators. All of Judgement Bey was nothing but an experiment to figure out whether 'natural' Wheelers who learned battling out on the streets or 'artificial', specifically trained Wheelers were superior. The outcome does not matter, however, as Ryan had all along been planning to make the winners his henchmen. He explains that there is a new world with beys different from those they know and that only strong Wheelers can open the gate leading to it. Team Estrella is intrigued and about to join Ryan in his quest for the new world, when Ryan also reveals he intents to take over the new world completely. Disgusted with his power-crazed personality Team Estrella turns from him. Shrugging it off, Ryan offers them a last chance to come and join him at the time of the gate opening. The members of Team Estrella decide that Ryan's plan must be stopped no matter what.
| 12 | "The Wheeler Bond" | September 29, 2012 |
Team Estrella head to the DREAM building to stop Ryan, where they find that they have to battle their way up to the highest floor to get through to him. They use the elevator to get up, but due to weight limits they have to leave Covey at the first floor to fight low class Dominator wheelers. At a higher floor with a kind of glass room the elevator is stopped by Jake, David and Gigante who see fighting Estrella as their only chance to restore their honour and earn Ryan's favour again. Marche and Nicole stay behind to take care of them, while the remaining three run on ahead. A floor higher they are confronted by Matthew and Lucy, who get challenged by Leon and Jin. Meanwhile in the glass room, Gigante hesitates to fight again as he is still shaken by his brother's sudden cruelty. Begging to have them start over anew he faces his brother in combat. Suddenly Scorpio and Fireblaze enter the scene. Glen and Sting have been set free but contrary to Jake's first assumption they have no intention of helping their teammates. Rather, they seek revenge for being so cruelly imprisoned and attempt to destroy the beys of friend and foe alike. Finally, Sho reaches the highest floor where Ryan and Odin await him.
| 13 | "A New World" | October 6, 2012 |
Ryan tries to set Odin and Sho against each other for another fight, but Odin turns on him and decides to side with Team Estrella. This causes Ryan to battle himself. After Odin suffers a quick defeat, Sho and Ryan begin the final match. In the glass room Sting and Glen appear to hold the upper hand, until Covey enters the scene. With a new person in the mix, everyone is forced to choose their sides. Glen and Sting go back to the Dominators, while Gigante now fights alongside Team Estrella. The match is now quickly decided and results in an explosion of the room. The Dominator's beys all fall down to the city and appear lost. Leon and Jin also manage to settle their fights with Matthew and Lucy, taking away victory. With every wheeler in Destection City cheering on him, Sho manages to improve his power and defeat Ryan after a long and hard battle. As it turns out, the gate to the new world opens either way. By the end of the episode, Team Estrella as well as Odin are shown to be about to head off into the unknown land.

== Toys ==
=== Within the series ===
BeyWheelz were said to be formed from a star fragment, just like its predecessor, Beyblade: Metal Fury. A BeyWheel is just like a Beyblade, only the toy has a slightly thicker outermost wheel and it is made to spin on its side. In the anime series there are three types of battling. One type is a Crash Battle. Two players battle in a head-to-head match and one person is the victor. Another type is a Race Battle. Two tops engage in a race to see who is the fastest. The last type is a Stunt Battle. Players see who will win by tops clashing with no mercy and only one will be left standing.

=== In real life ===
In May 2012, Hasbro displayed the BeyWheelz toy line at the American International Toy Fair in New York City. You have a launcher and a Beywheelz to fight and race other people. There are four parts of a Beywheelz, a spirit axle, a spirit shield, an energy core and an attack gear.
