= Beyblade: Metal Fusion =

Japanese manga series & its adaptations

- Volume 1 tankōbon cover featuring Gingka Hagane and his first Bey, the Pegasus 105F

メタルファイトベイブレード (Metaru Faito Beiburēdo)
- Manga

Metal Fight Beyblade
- Written by: Takafumi Adachi
- Published by: Shogakukan
- English publisher: SG: Chuang Yi
- Magazine: CoroCoro Comic
- English magazine: Co-Co! (Hong Kong)
- Original run: September 13, 2008 – February 15, 2012
- Volumes: 11
- Anime television series
- Directed by: Kunihisa Sugishima
- Produced by: Mamiko Aoki; Nao Yoshida
- Written by: Katsumi Hasegawa
- Music by: Neil Parfitt
- Studio: Nelvana; Tatsunoko Production
- Licensed by: NA: Nelvana
- Original network: YTV (Canada); TXN (TV Tokyo) (Japan)
- English network: AU: Network Ten, Eleven; AUS: Cartoon Network; CA: YTV; IN: Cartoon Network India; PH: Cartoon Network; UK: Nicktoons; US: Cartoon Network, Primo TV
- Original run: April 5, 2009 – March 28, 2010
- Episodes: 51
Further information
Anime television series
Beyblade: Metal Masters
Directed by	Kunihisa Sugishima
Produced by	Mamiko Aoki; Nao Yoshida
Written by	Katsumi Hasegawa
Music by	Neil Parfitt
Studio	SynergySP
Licensed by	NA: Nelvana
Original network	TXN (TV Tokyo)
English network	AU: Network Ten, Eleven; AUS: Cartoon Network; BI: Nicktoons; CA: YTV; IN: Cartoon Network India; PH: Cartoon Network; UK: Nicktoons Network; US: Cartoon Network
Original run	April 4, 2010 – March 27, 2011
Episodes	51
Anime film
Metal Fight Beyblade vs the Sun: Sol Blaze, the Scorching Hot Invader
Directed by	Kunihisa Sugishima
Written by	Katsumi Hasegawa
Music by	Scott Bucsis
Studio	SynergySP
Released	August 21, 2010
Runtime	75 minutes
Anime television series
Beyblade: Metal Fury
Directed by	Kunihisa Sugishima
Produced by	Mamiko Aoki; Yoshikazu Beniya
Written by	Katsumi Hasegawa
Music by	Scott Bucsis
Studio	SynergySP
Licensed by	NA: Nelvana
Original network	TXN (TV Tokyo)
English network	AU: Eleven; AUS: Cartoon Network; BI: Nicktoons; CA: YTV; IN: Cartoon Network; PH: Cartoon Network; UK: Nicktoons Network; US: Cartoon Network
Original run	April 3, 2011 – April 1, 2012
Episodes	52 (Japan); 39 (International)
- Related manga
- Beyblade; Metal Fight Beyblade Zero-G (sequel); Beyblade Burst; Beyblade X
- Related anime
- Beyblade; BeyWheelz; BeyWarriors: BeyRaiderz; BeyWarriors: Cyborg; Beyblade Burst; Beyblade X

Beyblade: Metal Fusion, known in Japan as Metal Fight Beyblade (メタルファイトベイブレード, Metaru Faito Beiburēdo), is a Japanese manga created by Takafumi Adachi, serialized in Shogakukan's monthly magazine CoroCoro Comic between September 2008 and February 2012.

The manga inspired an anime production, retroactively named Beyblade: Metal Saga, which encompasses four seasons: Metal Fusion, Metal Masters, Metal Fury and Shogun Steel. The first season's animation was produced by Tatsunoko Production, with subsequent seasons and spin-offs being produced by SynergySP. It premiered on TV Tokyo on April 5, 2009, and aired until December 23, 2012. Nelvana, which licensed and produced English adaptations of the original anime series, also localized the four seasons of Metal Saga.

== Plot ==
=== Metal Fusion ===
The series stars Gingka Hagane, a talented Blader traveling all around Japan to get stronger so he can defeat the Dark Nebula, an evil organization that is also responsible for the supposed death of Gingka's father, Ryo Hagane. Gingka aims to recover the forbidden Bey, Lightning L-Drago, which has been stolen by the Dark Nebula to use its powers to fulfill their wicked ambitions. Along with his bey, Storm Pegasus, Gingka must face and defeat many foes. Gingka's second-biggest rival is Kyoya Tategami, formerly head of a bad Blader group, called the Face Hunters. In their first encounter Gingka defeats Kyoya and after that Kyoya's only goal becomes to defeat Gingka. Gingka is the Blader who believes that every Blader has a Blader's spirit in them. The Dark Nebula recruits a Blader named Ryuga, who is given L-Drago. He travels around the world, defeating and either recruiting or destroying the Beyblades of other Bladers. Gingka battles Ryuga but is defeated. His friends are also defeated, including Kyoya. There is a tournament that the Dark Nebula has secretly organized called Battle Bladers, and Gingka hopes to battle Ryuga in the final match. Phoenix, is a mysterious masked Blader that appears at the best times, often saving Gingka, his friends, and his rivals. In a fierce battle with Doji, the head of the Dark Nebula, Phoenix saves Hyoma and Kenta. After Gingka arrives, the ceiling begins to collapse, and a broken piece breaks Phoenix's mask, revealing that Phoenix is Ryo, Gingka's father who is alive. Ryo explains how Storm Pegasus and the Lightning L-Drago came into existence. After this event, it is Kyoya vs Ryuga, in which Kyoya starts great but once the spirits of L-Drago enter and consume Ryuga's body he cannot hold his ground. Ryuga then explains that it is Gingka's fault that every one of his friends has been absorbed by the vicious L-Drago. It is the final battle and Ryuga seems to be using his full power against Gingka. Realizing that his friends will always be with him, he retaliates and calls for Pegasus. Before he can do that, it seems that L-Drago is trying to absorb Ryuga himself, changing him into a dragon/monster-like form. Gingka's friends are extremely worried and confused until Ryo comes and explains that nobody has been able to control L-Drago more than Ryuga. Furthermore, Ryo explains that the Lightning L-Drago is responsible for Ryuga's misbehavior. After that Gingka realizes that he needs to save Ryuga and free him of the dark power held in Lightning L-Drago. He uses an ultimate special move, Galaxy Nova, and defeats L-Drago. Ryuga walks away disappointed, not because he lost, but because he could not control Lightning L-Drago. Gingka tries to pick up Pegasus but Pegasus dies because it went past its limits numerous times. Ryo reassures Gingka that Pegasus will come back, the crew then celebrates with Hikaru, Tsubasa and Kyoya, who have just been released from the hospital.

=== Metal Masters ===
Beyblade: Metal Masters, also known in Japan as Metal Fight Beyblade Baku (メタルファイトベイブレード爆, Metaru Faito Beiburēdo Baku), is the second season of the Metal Saga. After Storm Pegasus sacrifices itself to defeat Lightning L-Drago and save Ryuga (voiced by Carman Melville) from L-Drago's dark power, Gingka (Robert Tinkler) hears from a rock which contains Galaxy Pegasus W105R^{2}F, The legendary Bey! First, Galaxy Pegasus battles with a new bey named Ray Striker (JP: Ray Unicorno) and its owner, Masamune Kadoya (Cameron Ansell). Together with Madoka (Barbara Mamabolo), Masamune, Yu (voiced by Denise Oliver), Tsubasa (David Reale), and Gingka, they form a team called Gan Gan Galaxy to participate the Beyblade World Championships and decided the No.1 in th Beyblade world. On the way, they have to battle Team Wang Hu Zhong, Team Lovushka, Team Wild Fang, Team Excalibur, Team Garcias, and Team Starbreaker with a new guy, Toby/Faust (voiced by Benjamin Israel) and other members of Team Starbreaker. The matches are hard at first, and they become harder as they progress through the Beyblade World Championships. Unknowingly, a man named Dr. Ziggurat attempts to find power and differentiate Beys by using the tournament to collect data for experiments he calls the Arrangements. These devices enhance a Blader's skills in Beyblade. But Gingka realizes that it was not safe. Therefore, Gingka and his friends together try to stop Dr. Ziggurat (Richard Waugh) and his Spiral Force. Gingka and Masamune battled together against a Bey named Twisted Tempo (JP: Basalt Horogium). Ryuga helped Gingka and Masamune. Then they were successful to stop the spiral force.

=== Metal Fury ===
Beyblade: Metal Fury, also known in Japan as Metal Fight Beyblade 4D (メタルファイトベイブレード4D, Metaru Faito Beiburēdo Fō Dī), is the third season of the Metal Saga. After their latest triumph against Hades Inc., Gingka is challenged by Kyoya to have a battle on a mysterious island. Gingka and Kyoya both fight as hard as they can, but neither can seem to gain the upper hand until Pegasus is stuck in mud. Kyoya uses his special move, King Lion Reverse Windstrike, but Gingka and Pegasus rally and fight on. Suddenly, both Gingka's and Kyoya's Beyblades transform. Gingka's new Beyblade is called Cosmic Pegasus (JP: Big Bang Pegasis), and Kyoya's Fang Leone. They soon realize that both Gingka and Kyoya's Beyblade were given power by a mysterious light that fell from the sky. Gingka and his friends find themselves saving a boy named Yuki from a mysterious boy named Johannes. As well as a boy genius and astronomer, Yuki is also a Blader who owns Mercury Anubius (JP: Mercury Anubis). Yuki came to tell Gingka and his friends about the Star Fragment which split into 10 pieces, and that two of them are in Gingka's and Kyoya's Beyblades, and that it must not fall into the hands of evil. He witnessed the Star Fragment fall from the sky and release beams of light. That evening, the Star Fragment told him that a great evil is trying to revive the God of Destruction, Nemesis by using the power of the Star Fragment and use it to destroy the world. In order to prevent Nemesis from being revived, they must find the rest of the ten "Legendary Bladers" who also have Beyblades with the power of the Star Fragment. Gingka and Kyoya travel first to an island in the Pacific after receiving intel that one of the Star Fragment pieces fell there. When they reach, they discover Ryuga at the top of a dormant volcano with a new Beyblade, L-Drago Destructor (JP: L-Drago Destroy). Kyoya battles Ryuga, but the overwhelming attack power of Ryuga's Beyblade defeats Kyoya. Gingka arrives to see Kyoya defeated, and explains to him that they need Ryuga's strength in order to take down Nemesis. However, Ryuga is stubborn and says that he will only cooperate if Gingka beats him in a battle. Ryuga and Gingka battle, and after a long fight, Gingka loses because was not powerful to fight Ryuga himself he was very weak. Ryuga leaves saying he would try and take the rest of the Star Fragments for himself. Gingka and his friends travel to China where it is believed a mysterious Blader known as the Crimson Flash might be one of the Legendary Bladers. They all enter a Tag Team Tournament, where Gingka masters a new special move, Cosmic Tornado against Dashan Wang, and Kyoya gets a new special move, King Lion Crushing Fang. Kyoya and Benkei battle Aguma and Bao, only to find out that he Crimson Flash, Bao, who has the Beyblade Hades Crown (JP: Hell Crown), is actually not the Legendary Blader and instead of that it is Aguma, with his Scythe Kronos. Gingka and Yuki advance to the final the face Bao and Aguma, however at the last moment Gingka is stopped from using his special move and Johannes recruits Aguma. After that, they head to America and witnessed the Destroyer Dome! After Block A and B each have three bladers left, the final six battle for the last time with the winner being King along with his Bey, Variares D:D who turns out to be the sixth Legendary Blader. In Africa, Team Wild Fang help them through a maze and a mountain entering a sacred place where they meet Dynamis and his Bey, Jade Jupiter who is the seventh Legendary Blader. He tells them about the history of the star fragment and that one of the pieces has already fell into Nemesis and that there are two more Legendary Bladers left. Kyoya leaves the group and heads off to unknown parts. They head off to Easter Island and battle trying to see who is the Legendary Blader of Winter is. A new Blader named Chris and Masamune battle in the finals, and after it is over, Chris is revealed to be the Legendary Blader with his Bey, Phantom Orion.

== Media ==
=== Manga ===
The Metal Fusion manga was written and illustrated by Takafumi Adachi. In Japan, they were published in the monthly CoroCoro Comic magazine, from September 2008 to February 2012. Shogakukan later compiled the chapters into eleven shinsōban volumes. The first volume was released on March 27, 2009, and the last on March 28, 2012. The chapters were released without a title during the serialisation, where they were identified only by an arc name and a chapter number. The chapter names appeared for the first time in the volume compilation.

Adachi returned to draw a one-shot reunion that was published in the Summer 2019 issue of CoroCoro Aniki.

=== Anime ===
The first season was produced by Tatsunoko Production. Nelvana produced the English-language version and licensed the series as Beyblade: Metal Fusion. The series aired in Japan on TV Tokyo and its affiliates between April 5, 2009, and March 28, 2010. It premiered in North America later that Fall on YTV in Canada and Cartoon Network in the United States. Beyblade: Metal Fusion briefly rerun on Primo TV in late 2020. The Metal Trilogy and Shogun Steel are rerunning on Disney XD as of January 3, 2021.

In 2010, Nelvana announced that they were looking at parties interested in producing a second season of the anime series, which would be titled Beyblade: Metal Masters. The second season produced by SynergySP instead of Tatsunoko Pro, aired in Japan from April 4, 2010, and March 27, 2011. A third season was announced in Shogakukan's CoroCoro Comic magazine. Released as Beyblade: Metal Fury in North America, the third season aired between April 3, 2011, and April 1, 2012. The fourth and final season, Beyblade: Shogun Steel, aired in Japan between April 8, 2012, and December 23, 2012. Episodes 39–45 of this season were released on DVD on August 27, 2013, and September 25, 2013.

=== Video games ===
The first video game to be released from the Beyblade: Metal Fusion series was Metal Fight Beyblade DS, which debuted on March 26, 2009, for the Nintendo DS in Japan and November 9, 2010, in the United States. The majority of the games produced so far have only been released in Japan, though Hudson Soft has localized the second Nintendo DS game and the Nintendo Wii game for North America, which is called "Battle Fortress". So far, all dedicated Metal Fight Beyblade games have been developed and published by Hudson Soft. The most recent Metal Fight Beyblade video game to be released was "Metal Fight Beyblade: Choujou Kessen! Big Bang Blader" for the DS in Japan, which was released on December 2, 2010.
