= Beyblade: Shogun Steel =

Japanese manga series

メタルファイトベイブレード ZERO-G (Metaru Faito Beiburēdo Zero-G)
- Manga
- Written by: Takafumi Adachi
- Published by: Shogakukan
- Magazine: CoroCoro Comic
- Original run: April 2012 – December 2012
- Volumes: 2
- Anime television series
- Directed by: Kunihisa Sugishima
- Produced by: Mamiko Aoki; Yoshikazu Beniya
- Written by: Katsumi Hasegawa
- Music by: Neil Parfitt and Scott Bucsis
- Studio: SynergySP
- Licensed by: NA: Nelvana
- Original network: TXN (TV Tokyo)
- English network: AU: Eleven; BI: Cartoon Network; CA: YTV; IN: Marvel HQ; US: Cartoon Network
- Original run: April 8, 2012 – December 23, 2012
- Episodes: 45 (Japanese version); 26 (English version)

Beyblade: Shogun Steel, also known as Metal Fight Beyblade Zero-G (メタルファイトベイブレード ZERO-G, Metaru Faito Beiburēdo ZERO-G), is a Japanese manga by Takafumi Adachi that was based on Takara Tomy's Beyblade franchise. It was published between April 2012 and December 2012 in CoroCoro Comic, and serves as the conclusion to the Beyblade Metal Saga, whereas the previous installments focused on metal parts, the line of Beyblades in Shogun Steel focused on zero gravity battles with the advent of a new stadium system.

Furthermore, this manga was adapted into an anime season that aired on TV Tokyo and its affiliates in Japan from April 8, 2012, to December 23, 2012, and marks the seventh overall anime series in the franchise. The entire season was released on DVD on February 12, 2019, from Cinedigm.

For the first time ever in the series, the manga, anime and toyline were planned and released simultaneously.

== Plot ==
Seven years have passed since the God of Destruction met his end at the hands of a Legendary Blader. A new era of Beyblade has begun, bringing with it new Blades. When Zyro Kurogane witnessed this final battle with the lord of destruction years ago, a fire began to burn within him to push forward to a new future – while Zyro is the champion in his hometown, he wants to test himself and seek out more significant opponents. Thus, he heads to Metal Bey City, Gingka's hometown. When Zyro arrives and discovers that Gingka is nowhere to be found, he learns that Bladers from all over the world have come to test themselves against the Cyclone Bey stadium. Wanting to push his skills to the next level, Zyro takes part in the new era of Beyblade and tests his might against the Cyclone stadium. In this series, Zyro is also guided by Gingka to become a true Blader.

== Characters ==
Zyro Kurogane (黒銀 ゼロ, Kurogane Zero)
Voiced by: Nobuhiko Okamoto (Japanese); Brian West (English)
Zyro is a young boy who saw Gingka's final battle seven years ago and aspired to become a Blader ever since. With his beyblade, Samurai Ifrit, he sets out on a journey to become a great Blader following the same path as Gingka's.
Shinobu Hiryuin (火竜院 忍, Hiryūin Shinobu)
Voiced by: Kōki Uchiyama (Japanese); Christopher Jacot (English)
Shinobu is the strongest Blader to be found in Metal Bey City. When Zyro first arrives and learns of this, he instantly becomes Zyro's rival. Shinobu has managed to become the strongest Blader in the city thanks to his beyblade, Ninja Salamander.
Maru (マル, Maru)
Voiced by: Sumire Morohoshi (Japanese); Stephany Seki (English)
A Junior Data Collector and mechanic.
Kite Unabara (海原 カイト, Unabara Kaito)
Voiced by: Takuma Terashima (Japanese); Amos Crawley (English)
The older brother of Eight. His beyblade is Guardian Leviathan 160SB. He syn-chromed his beyblade with his brother's Pirate Orochi to create Orochi Leviathan.
Eight Unabara (海原 エイト, Unabara Eito)
Voiced by: Yuki Kodaira (Japanese); Stacey DePass (English)
The younger brother of Kite. His beyblade is Pirate Orochi 145D. He has also offered his beyblade to his brother at times to synchrome and form Orochi Leviathan.
Ren Kurenai (紅 蓮, Kurenai Ren)
Voiced by: Kanae Oki (Japanese); Bryn McAuley (English)
Her beyblade is Thief Phoenix E230GCF.
Madoka Amano (天野 まどか, Amano Madoka)
Voiced by: Kei Shindou (Japanese); Barbara Mamabolo (English)
An attractive beyblade mechanic expert who works at the B-Pit.
Tsubasa Otori (大鳥 翼, Ōtori Tsubasa)
Voiced by: Miyu Irino (Japanese); David Reale (English)
The current president of the World Beyblade Battle Association (WBBA).
Blader Gai (ブレーダーガイ, Burēdā Gai)
Voiced by: Shintarō Asanuma (Japanese); Adam Cawley (English)
Blader Gai is the announcer of the tournaments. He has a stylish personality and is very cheerful.
Argo Garcia (アルゴ・グレイシー, Arugo Gureishī; Argo Gracie)
The DNA founder.
Ian Garcia (アイアン・グレイシー, Aian Gureishī; Ian Gracie)
A DNA executive.
Selen Garcia (セレン・グレイシー, Seren Gureishī; Selen Gracie)
A DNA executive.
Enso Garcia (エンソ・グレイシー, Enso Gureishī; Enso Gracie)
A DNA executive.
Merci (メルシー, Merushī; Merusi-)
A Dark Nebula computer AI rebuilt by DNA, which later revealed itself in A New Fight as the original organizer of the Dark Nebula Association, Doji. He helps Kira acquire Gladiator Bahamoote SP230GF in order for him to become the next ultimate beyblader.
Yoshio Iwayama (岩山 美男, Iwayama Yoshio)
One of the members of DNA and known for his powerful defensive style. His Beyblade is Bandit Golem DF145BS, but is also in possession of Berserker Behemoth SR200BWD after Kira replaced it with Gladiator Bahamoote SP230GF. With Berserker Behemoth, he has synchromed his Golem with it to create Behemoth Golem.
Kira Hayama (破山 キラ, Hayama Kira)
A fearsome and powerful blader who is from DNA. His beyblade was Berserker Behemoth SR200BWD until he replaced it with Gladiator Bahamoote SP230GF. Upon kidnapping Gingka, he steals Pegasus in order to synchrome Pegasus Bahamoote, a very powerful bey.
Genjuro Kamegaki (亀垣 玄十郎, Kamegaki Genjūrō)
The third DNA blader. His beyblade is Bandit Genbu F230TB.
Spike Bourne (スパイク・ボーン, Supaiku Bōn)
The fourth DNA Blader, a dangerous member. His beyblade is Thief Zirago WA130HF.
Captain Arrow (キャプテンアロー, Kyaputen Arō)
The fifth DNA blader known as the Blader of Justice. His beyblade is Archer Wyvern 145WB.
Baihu Xiao (シャオ・バイフー / 白虎小, Shao Baifū)
The sixth DNA Blader who is also known as Kira's right-hand man. His beyblade is Berserker Byakko 125S.
Karura (カルラ, Karura)
The seventh DNA member who convinces everyone that he is able to control the elements of nature. His beyblade is Guardian Garudas SD145PF.
Benkei Hanawa (花輪 ベンケイ, Hanawa Benkei)
Voiced by: Kenta Miyake (Japanese); Jason Deline (English)
The manager of the restaurant Bull Burger and a teacher at the Bey Park. He trains Zyro throughout the show.
Gingka Hagane (鋼 銀河, Hagane Ginga)
Voiced by: Aki Kanada (Japanese); Robert Tinkler (English)
The No.1 Blader in the world and the strongest Legendary Blader. Gingka returns to help Zyro unlock his blader's spirit and battles him. He uses Samurai Pegasus W105R^{2}F which evolved from his previous beyblade, Cosmic Pegasus.
Sakyo Kuroyami (黒闇 左京, Kuroyami Sakyō)
Voiced by: Shouma Yamamoto (Japanese); Elias Edraki (English)
A mysterious blader who aims to succeed the late Ryuga as the next Dragon Emperor. His beyblade is Ronin Dragoon LW160BSF. Sakyo is extremely powerful and almost undefeated through the series.
Takanosuke Shishiya (獅々谷 鷹ノ助, Shishiya Takanosuke)
Voiced by: Megumi Han (Japanese); Tony Babcock (English)
A rival blader to Ren and Zyro, who partners with Sakyo. His bey is Archer Griffin.
Gen Kikura (木倉 ゲン, Kikura Gen)
A blader disguised as a sea creature, specialized in defense. His beyblade is Pirate Kraken.
Akuya Onizaki (鬼崎 悪矢, Onizaki Akuya)
A blader that frequently battles in group with henchmen. His bey is Archer Gargoyle.

== Episodes ==
As with previous entries in the franchise, Shogun Steel was localized into English by Nelvana. The series premiered on YTV in Canada and Cartoon Network in the United States on September 17, 2015. It would be the final series to be dubbed by Nelvana. The series started rerunning on Disney XD on January 3, 2021.
