= Robert Tinkler =

Canadian voice actor

- Born: Winnipeg, Manitoba, Canada
- Other name: Rob Tinkler
- Education: Ryerson University
- Occupation: Voice actor
- Years active: 1993–present
- Spouse: Jessica Tinkler
- Website: robtinkler.com

Robert "Rob" Tinkler is a Canadian voice actor who provides voices for a number of cartoons and anime shows. He voiced Max in The Adventures of Sam & Max: Freelance Police, Delete in the children's animated series Cyberchase, Pelswick Eggert in Pelswick, and Howie in Almost Naked Animals, as well as being the voice of Woodstock in Peanuts specials and shows produced by WildBrain.

In anime, he provides the voice of Crimson Rubeus in the DIC Entertainment dub of Sailor Moon, Gingka Hagane, the main protagonist in the Beyblade: Metal Saga series and Brooklyn in Beyblade G-Revolution. In feature films, he voiced Buddy in The Nut Job.

== Early life ==
Tinkler was born in Winnipeg, Manitoba to Beverly (née Duncan) and Brian Tinkler, a wire supplier.

== Career ==
Tinkler became involved in community theatre, performing in plays and musicals, and was subsequently accepted into the Theatre program into Ryerson University, from which he graduated. At Ryerson, he met future sketch comedy collaborators Mike Beaver, Jason Jones, and Stacey DePass. He made his first acting career in It's Alive! as an unknown character. Then, he voiced Max in The Adventures of Sam & Max: Freelance Police. Tinkler voiced many characters in many Canadian television shows such as Pelswick as the title character, Medabots as Spike and Seaslug, Cyberchase as Delete, and Jacob Two-Two as Daniel. In The Nut Job, he voiced Buddy, the friend of Surly Squirrel, and Redline. A role he later reprised in The Nut Job 2: Nutty by Nature just as Buddy. In Franny's Feet, he voiced Salsa the Monkey. Starting from 2019, Tinkler is the current voice of Woodstock, a character in the Peanuts comic strips created by Charles M. Schulz.

Earlier before voicing Woodstock, Tinkler also voiced Fish and Thing 1 and 2 in The Cat in the Hat Knows a Lot About That!, including the unnamed Teacher in PJ Masks and The Bobroom as sketch characters with Harry and His Bucket Full of Dinosaurs voicing Steggy, Rover in Lunar Jim, various characters in Inspector Gadget, Howie in Almost Naked Animals, and Beyblade: Metal Fusion as Ginga Hagane. For his performance as Delete in Cyberchase, Tinkler won an Outstanding New Approaches — Daytime Children's at the 36th Daytime Emmy Awards. In his late teens, Tinkler became involved in community theatre, performing in plays and musicals, and was subsequently accepted into the Theatre program at Ryerson University (later acquiring his BFA hons). At Ryerson, he met future sketch comedy collaborators Mike Beaver, Jason Jones, and Stacey DePass. His first gig out of school was a series on YTV called "It's Alive". The show was of the sketch comedy variety, and while acting on the series Rob was introduced to and became interested in writing.

After the show's cancellation, and growing frustrated with a dwindling influx of acting work at that time, Rob and his then-roommates Mike Beaver and Shaun Majumder decided to form the comedy troupe "Beaver, Tinkler, Majumder". This triumvirate soon welcomed Jason Jones, and then Stacey DePass and Jennifer Baxter (who were also on "It's Alive") and the troupe was renamed "The Bobroom". Also during this period, Rob realized an affinity for voice-overs and he booked several animated series including The Adventures of Sam & Max Freelance Police, X-Men and Sailor Moon. After writing, mounting and performing in many live sketch shows with The Bobroom at clubs across Toronto and excursions into Chicago and New York City, the troupe was soon approached by Milan Curry-Sharples about doing the comedy showcase series Comedy Now. Although this show was more of a vehicle for stand-up comedians, this endeavor ultimately led to the development and creation of the sketch comedy series "The Bobroom" for the Comedy Network. Although the series ran only for a limited time, it was a learning ground for Rob as he not only amassed characters but honed skills in writing for the screen.

Also around this time, Rob landed several roles on feature film productions, including The Tuxedo and the cult classic Harold And Kumar Go To White Castle. After embarking on a couple of pilot seasons in Los Angeles, Rob received the accreditation to relocate to the US on a full-time basis. There, he has written for several animated series (Wayside, Pandalian and Almost Naked Animals) and did voices on video games (Superman Returns, Marvel: Ultimate Alliance 2), and several pilots and series (Celebrity Deathmatch), including the Fox prime time animated series American Dad!. He's also performed in countless commercials and had a recurring role as Rachael Harris' whipping boy in ABC's Notes From The Underbelly. Rob plays too many characters to name on PBS's The Cat in the Hat Knows a Lot About That!, as well as voices leading danger dog Howie in YTV/Cartoon Network's Almost Naked Animals and Gingka in Beyblade: Metal Fusion. Rob divides his time between LA and Toronto as he continues to develop series and films. In addition to acting, writing, and directing, he was also a creative consultant on Almost Naked Animals.

== Filmography ==
=== Animation ===
List of voice performances in animation
Year	Title	Role	Notes	Source
1995–1998	Sailor Moon (DIC Entertainment dub)	Crimson Rubeus		
1996–1998	Stickin' Around	Additional voices		
1997–1998	The Adventures of Sam & Max: Freelance Police	Max		
1999–2001	Angela Anaconda	Mark and Derek Anaconda		
2000–2002	Pelswick	Pelswick Eggert		
2001	Undergrads	Mump		
2001–2004	Medabots	Spike/Seaslug		
2002–present	Cyberchase	Delete	Nominated – Outstanding New Approaches – Daytime Children's (listed with Cyberchase cast and crew), 36th Daytime Emmy Awards	
2003	Moville Mysteries	Alonzo Longneck	Episode: "Just My Luck"	
2003–2006	Jacob Two Two	Daniel		
2003–2010	Franny's Feet	Salsa the Donkey		
2004	Beyblade G-Revolution	Brooklyn		
2004	Totally Spies!	Arnold Jackson	Episode: "Morphing Is Sooo 1987"	
2004–2008	Miss Spider's Sunny Patch Friends	Grub		
2005	Slam Dunk	Hanamichi Sakuragi		
2006	Lunar Jim	Rover		
2009	Bakugan Battle Brawlers: New Vestroia	Lync Volan, Helios		
2010–2018	The Cat in the Hat Knows a Lot About That!	Fish, Thing One, Thing Two, Additional voices		
2010–2014	Beyblade: Metal Saga	Gingka Hagane	Four series (Metal Fusion, Metal Masters, Metal Fury and Shogun Steel)	
2010	Sidekick	Nocturna		
2011–2013	Almost Naked Animals	Howie		
2011	Bakugan: Mechtanium Surge	Wiseman, Betadron, Tremblar, Balista		
2012	Mudpit	Slime		
2013–2015	Grojband	G'ORB, Captain Tighty Whitey, Shaven Beard, Barney		
2013–2015	Oh No! It's an Alien Invasion	Shakes		
2013–2015	Julius Jr.	Shaka Brah Yeti		
2013–2015	The Day My Butt Went Psycho!	Deuce		
2013	Beyblade: Shogun Steel	Gingka Hagane		
2014–2016	Numb Chucks	Hooves		
2014–2017	Trucktown	Max		
2015–2024	PJ Masks	Teacher		
2015	Inspector Gadget	Various characters		
2016–2020	Rusty Rivets	Ray, Botasaur, Bytes, Opera Singing Monkey		
2016–2021	Ranger Rob	Chipper		
2016–2017	The ZhuZhus	Chunk, Bean		
2017–2018	Mysticons	Ferrus and Halite Goldenbraid		
2016	Trucktown	Max	Nominated – Canadian Screen Award, Best Performance in an Animated Program or Series	
2018–2023	Total DramaRama	Additional voices		
2018–2023	Bakugan: Battle Planet	Tiko, Additional voices		
2019–2021	Snoopy in Space	Woodstock		
2019–2021	Alien TV	Ixbee		
2019–2021	Norman Picklestripes	Additional voices		
2019	Dragamonz	Dax, Master Perros and Azakai		
2020	Powerbirds	Nibbles		
2020	Remy & Boo	Boo		
2021	Snoopy Presents: For Auld Lang Syne	Woodstock, Spike, Olaf	TV special	
2021–2023	Go, Dog. Go!	Early Ed		
2021–2023	The Snoopy Show	Woodstock, Spike		
2022	Snoopy Presents: It's the Small Things, Charlie Brown	Woodstock	TV special	
2022	Snoopy Presents: To Mom (and Dad), With Love	Woodstock, Woodstock's Mom	TV special	
2022	Snoopy Presents: Lucy's School	Woodstock	TV special	
2022–2023	My Little Pony: Make Your Mark	Sparky Sparkeroni		
2023	Snoopy Presents: One-of-a-Kind Marcie	Woodstock	TV special	
2024	Snoopy Presents: Welcome Home, Franklin	Woodstock	TV special	
2024	Camp Snoopy	Woodstock		
2025	Snoopy Presents: A Summer Musical	Woodstock	TV special	
2026	Snoopy Presents: There's No Place Like Home, Snoopy	Woodstock	TV special	

=== Film ===
List of voice performances in feature films
Year	Title	Role	Notes	Source
2014	The Nut Job	Redline, Buddy		
2017	The Nut Job 2: Nutty by Nature	Redline		

List of voice performances in direct-to-video and television films
Year	Title	Role	Notes	Source
2004	Care Bears: Journey to Joke-a-lot	Grumpy Bear		
2005	The Care Bears' Big Wish Movie	Grumpy Bear		
2000	MXP: Most Xtreme Primate	Stanley		

=== Live-action ===
List of acting performances in film and television
Year	Title	Role	Notes	Source
1993–1997	It's Alive!			
2000	The Bobroom	Sketch characters		
2004	Harold & Kumar Go to White Castle	JD	US Film	

== Awards and nominations ==
- Nominated – Outstanding New Approaches – Daytime Children's (listed with Cyberchase cast and crew), 36th Daytime Emmy Awards
- Nominated – Canadian Screen Award, Best Performance in an Animated Program or Series - Trucktown
