= Ryūga =

- Gender: Male

Origin
- Origin: Japanese
- Meaning: Different meanings depending on the kanji used

Ryūga, Ryuga or Ryuuga (リューガ, リュウガ or りゅうが.) is a masculine Japanese given name.

== Written forms ==
Ryūga can be written using different kanji characters and can mean:

- 隆雅, "noble, elegant"
- 隆我, "noble, oneself"
- 竜賀, "dragon, joy"
- 竜牙, "dragon, fang"
- 竜雅, "dragon, elegant"
- 竜我, "dragon, oneself"
- 流牙, "current, fang"
- 琉牙, "gem, fang"
- 龍我, "imperial, oneself"
- 龍賀, "imperial, joy"
- 龍牙, "imperial, fang"
- 龍雅, "imperial, elegant"

The name can also be written in hiragana or katakana.

== People with the name ==
- Ryuga Suzuki (鈴木 隆雅; born 1994), Japanese footballer

== Fictional characters ==
- Ryuga Hideki, an alias used by L in the manga series Death Note
- Kamen Rider Ryuga, a character in a television series
- Ryuga Dougai (道外 流牙), a character from the TV series Garo
- Ryuuga Crusade (リューガ・クルセイド), a character in Demonbane
- Ryuga (リュウガ), one of the other main characters in Fist of the North Star
- Ryuga, character in Beyblade: Metal Fusion, Beyblade: Metal Masters and Beyblade: Metal Fury
- Banjou Ryuuga, a major character and Kamen Rider Cross-Z in Kamen Rider Build

== See also ==
- Ryūga Caves, one of the National Historic Sites in Japan
