= List of Beyblade: Metal Saga characters =

This list includes characters from the Metal Saga series.

== Main characters ==
Gingka Hagane (鋼銀河)
Voiced by: Aki Kanada (Japanese); Robert Tinkler (English)
Gingka is the main protagonist throughout the Metal Saga series. In 'Metal Fusion', he is introduced as a vagrant travelling through Japan. Upon arriving in Metal Bey City, he helps to save Kenta from the Face Hunters, defeating Kyoya in a Beyblade battle. He later befriends Madoka and Benkei. Gingka uses the attack-type Beyblade Storm Pegasus 105RF in 'Metal Fusion'. Joining the Beyblade tournament Battle Bladers, he ultimately defeats Ryuga and the Dark Nebula organization, which results in the sacrifice of Storm Pegasus.
In 'Metal Masters', Gingka uses the Beyblade Galaxy Pegasus W105R2F. Alongside Masamune, Tsubasa, and Yu, he would compete in the Beyblade World Championships as part of Team Gan Gan Galaxy, ultimately defeating the American team, Team Starbreaker. Pegasus would later evolve into Big Bang Pegasus F:D in 'Metal Fury' due to an enchantment with a star fragment. Gingka and his friends help to uncover the mystery of the legendary bladers and stop Nemesis, the god of destruction.
Kenta Yumiya
Voiced by: Emiri Katō (Japanese); Lisette St. Louis (English)
A young Beyblader who dreams of one day becoming a champion. Before meeting Gingka, he is initially afraid of the Face Hunters until Gingka soundly defeats them, telling him that the battle was decided by the blader's heart. His greatest goal now is to become as powerful at Beyblade as Gingka, though it has so far proven difficult for him.
Madoka Amano
Voiced by: Kei Shindō (Japanese); Barbara Mamabolo (English)
A young girl who repairs Beyblades at her father's shop, B-Pit. Though she rarely uses her beyblade at all she knows almost all things about it. If there are any problems in her friends' beys, she is always there for her friends, and she helps Gingka and Kenta with their battles. In Beyblade: Metal Masters, she becomes the supporting member of Team Gan-Gan Galaxy and travels to many countries with them. In "Beyblade: Metal Fury", she helps her friends stop the God of Destruction 'Nemesis'. She later inherits her father's shop in Beyblade Shogun Steel.
Kyoya Tategami
Voiced by: Satoshi Hino (Japanese); Peter Cugno (English)
Gingka's second greatest rival and the former leader of the Face Hunters. After losing to Gingka, he decided to disband the group and eventually joined Gingka and his friends on several occasions. He was also the leader of the African representational team, Team Wild Fang during the Big Bang Bladers World Championships. In Metal Fury, he's on a quest with Gingka and the Legendary Bladers to stop Nemesis from controlling the world. His Beyblade was Rock Leone 145WB in Metal Fusion/Masters, which would later evolve into Fang Leone 130W2D in Metal Fury following an enchantment with a star fragment.
Benkei Hanawa
Voiced by: Kenta Miyake (Japanese); Jason Deline (English)
A former member of the Face Hunters. He first appears to be a bully, and after he saw Gingka defeat Kyoya in the 2nd episode of Metal Fusion, he then wanted to beat him, and in Episode 4, Doji gave him a new bey, Dark Bull, in an attempt to defeat Gingka, and in a battle, he would end up losing. As time goes on, he reveals himself to be, in fact, a dedicated and kind person deep down. His true goal is to become a Beyblade like Kyoya, because the first time they met, he is soundly defeated by him. Since then, he has remained by his side. In Metal Masters, he joins Kyoya in Team Wild Fang, the African team, and uses the guise of The Masked Bull. In Shogun Steel, he becomes the owner of a fast-food restaurant.
Yu Tendo
Voiced by: Kaori Nazuka (Japanese); Denise Oliver (English)
A former member of Dark Nebula, Yu first appears during the Battle Island Tournament, and emerges as the victor after defeating Gingka. Yu escapes from Dark Nebula after battling Reiji, and joins Gingka's team. In Metal Masters, Yu is one of the members of Team Gan Gan Galaxy, being the substitute member, A young and intelligent blader, Yu is energetic and enjoys Beyblading for fun. Yu often gives nicknames to his friends. His Beyblade is Flame Libra T125ES.
Tsubasa Otori
Voiced by: Miyu Irino (Japanese); David Reale (English)
A secret agent working for the WBBA who uses his Bey, Earth Aquila 145WD. When he first meets Gingka, he saves him from an anonymous group of bladers. In Metal Masters, he becomes a member of Team Gan-Gan Galaxy but struggles with his dark side after being infected by L-Drago until Ryuga helps him control it. In Shogun Steel, he becomes the President of the WBBA, succeeding Ryo, and with Madoka's help, they both invent the Zero-G Stadium, which opens a new whole concept of Beyblade.
Masamune Kadoya
Voiced by: Yuko Sanpei (Japanese); Cameron Ansell (English)
A blader from America who was actually born in Japan. When he first meets Gingka, he challenges him to a battle but loses about six times before eventually defeating him. He always calls himself the world's No.1 blader. He is a member of Team Gan-Gan Galaxy.
Yuki Mizusawa
Voiced by: Mayuki Makiguchi (Japanese); Taylor Abrahamse (English)
A Legendary Blader, specifically a Solar System Blader representing the planet Mercury.

== Supporting characters ==
Ryuga
Voiced by: Kenjiro Tsuda (Japanese); Carman Melville (English)
Gingka's initial arch-nemesis and a powerful blader who aims to become the strongest blader by wielding the forbidden bey Lightning L-Drago 100HF. With his powerful L-Drago, he initially serves with the Dark Nebula, but after being defeated by Gingka and Pegasus, he trains hard to unleash L-Drago's true power not affected by darkness and the evil of humanity and evolves into the Meteo L-Drago LW105LF, while also later helps Gingka stop the Spiral Force from destroying the Earth. He later inherits a piece of a star fragment to evolve L-Drago further into L-Drago Destructor F:S, but in the end, he and L-Drago are overpowered by the evil of Nemesis, and with his last ounces of strength, passes the fragment onto Kenta before he and L-Drago vanish as they pass on to the afterlife.
Hikaru Hasama
Voiced by: Marina Inoue (Japanese); Katie Griffin (English)
Hikaru becomes a blader after promising her late mother to become the strongest blader in the world. She later finishes her career after being defeated by Ryuga, leaving her traumatized from ever battling again after the events with Ryuga and L-Drago. Hikaru becomes Ryo's assistant at the WBBA, yet still suffers from fear of seeing L-Drago again when Tsubasa lets the darkness he absorbed from L-Drago surface during Team Gan Gan Galaxy's battle with Team Wild Fang, forcing Ryo to protect her because of her past trauma. Nevertheless, during the attempt to enter Hades City, Hikaru temporarily comes out of retirement to use her Aquario to help Gingka and the others get in to stop the Spiral Force.
Hyoma
Voiced by: Tetsuya Kakihara (Japanese); Lyon Smith (English)
Gingka's childhood friend from Koma Village.
Doji
Voiced by: Takehito Koyasu (Japanese); Juan Chioran and Andrew Jackson (English)
The executive of the Dark Nebula Organization.
Reiji Mizuchi
Voiced by: Akeno Watanabe (Japanese); Brian Froud (English)
The only other blader besides Ryuga who uses dark moves.
Ryo Hagane
Voiced by: Sho Hayami (Japanese); Ron Pardo (English)
Gingka's father was thought to be dead, but he has actually survived and hidden behind a mask with the name of " Phoenix". in Metal Masters, he becomes the director of the WBBA, with Hikaru as his assistant, protecting her when she suffers a panic attack from the trauma she suffered at the hands of Ryuga and L-Drago, causing her to quit Beyblade as a result when Tsubasa loses control of his own inner darkness and causes Aquila to assume an L-Drago-like appearance.
Dashan Wang
Voiced by: Wataru Hatano (Japanese); Dan Petronijevic (English)
The leader of Team Wang Hu Zhong.
Chi-Yun Li
Voiced by: Mitsuki Saiga (Japanese); Susan Roman (English)
A very serious and intensive beyblader.
Chao Xin
Voiced by: Hiroki Takahashi (Japanese); Graeme Cornies (English)
An extremely arrogant Beyblade and a definite ladies man. When Team Wang Hu Zhong reunites with Gan Gan Galaxy before their match with Team Excalibur, Madoka had threatened to break up the team because of their infighting. Luckily, Chao Xin can use his wits and charm to convince Madoka to give Gingka, Tsubasa, Yu, and Masamune another chance, and it works.
Mei-Mei
Voiced by: Mai Nakahara (Japanese); Katie Griffin (English)
A very outgoing and shy girl and sub of Team Whang Hu Zhong.
Nile
Voiced by: Akio Suyama (Japanese); Shawn Korson (English)
The second official blader of Team Wild Fang. His name could be derived from the Nile River in eastern Africa, as his bey, Vulcan Horuseus, is based on the Egyptian god Horus.
Demure
Voiced by: Tsubasa Yonaga (Japanese); Jason Deline (English)
The third official blader of Team Wild Fang.
Julian Konzern
Voiced by: Daisuke Kirii (Japanese); Shawn Meunier (English)
The leader of Team Excalibur, representing Italy. A once-powerful Beyblade with his bey Gravity Perseus, which could rotate clockwise or counterclockwise, Julian wanted to continue his family's legacy of being winners. However, Ryuga sees him as a rival due to how L-Drago was the only true reverse rotation bey in the world. After losing to Gingka, Julian trained hard to regain his honor and overcome his loss, but when facing Damian of Team Star Breaker, Julian's best efforts were in vain as Damian toyed with him, breaking his morale and spirit, and even when Wales and Sophie came to his aid, all three were defeated by Kerbecs and its Hell's Gate special move, completely shattering Julian's self-confidence. As a final insult, Damian forces him to admit he was weak, cackling demonically after Julian admits it. Worse, Julian loses his assets to Dr. Ziggurat and Hades Inc. and is forced to join them as a way to win back his honor and fortune. However, after losing to Dashan Wang, Julian is convinced by Wales and Sophie to turn back to the good side to make Team Excalibur stronger than ever. He later assists Gingka with stopping Nemesis as he and Team Excalibur give their energy to Gingka and Pegasus to destroy Nemesis once and for all. In the Japanese dub of Metal Masters/Fury, his name is Julius Caesar, possibly a reference to the Roman general and statesman of the same name.
Sophie
Voiced by: Eri Kitamura (Japanese); Onalea Gilbertson (English)
A member of Team Excalibur, representing France. Sophie always tag battles with Wales.
Wales
Voiced by: Yoshimasa Hosoya (Japanese); Scott Gorman (English)
A member of Team Excalibur, representing England. Wales always tag battles with Sophie.
Klaus
Voiced by: Hisao Egawa (Japanese); Marcel St. Pierre (English)
The muscle of Team Excalibur, representing Germany.
Argo Garcia
Voiced by: Taiten Kusunoki (Japanese); Jeff Teravainen (English)
A power-hungry maniac who only cares to win by any means needed. Argo is not above injuring his opponents or playing dirty in any shape or form. This rubbed off on his siblings, everyone wanting to cheat to win. His behavior stems from him and his siblings having grown up in poverty, which is why he also has a grudge against those who they think have lived an easy life and who win fairly, like Tsubasa.
Selen Garcia
Voiced by: Yui Kano (Japanese); Novie Edwards (English)
A devious and loud-mouthed member of Team Garcia. She normally deceives her opponents with tricks to win or puts them under unfair conditions just to win the match. Selen is used to test out the power and see if the opponent is strong enough.
Ian Garcia
Voiced by: Daisuke Shusaku (Japanese); Hadley Kay (English)
An arrogant and a weaker member of Team Garcia. Due to his battling skills and tournament reputation, he is considered the second most powerful on the team but never backs his reputation while in mid-battle.
Enso Garcia
Voiced by: Miyako Ito (Japanese); Lisette St. Louis (English)
A sneaky and devious young blader belonging to Team Garcia. He normally uses unfair tactics and trickery to defeat his opponents, until it backfires and blows up in his face. They use Enso first to find one team member of the opposing team so they can see their power and strategy.
Damian Hart
Voiced by: Romi Park (Japanese); Carter Hayden (English)
Damian is a very confident and extremely arrogant blader. He is the leader of Team Star Breaker because he is their most powerful blader. Damian uses his abilities to toy with his opponents and squeezes as much of a battle out of them as he can. Damian has a very special gold launcher, and his Hell Kerbecs goes well with it. His nickname for Gingka Hagane is 'Blabbermouth'. He is also shown to be extremely psychotic, laughing demonically at his defeated opponents, and when he loses to Gingka and later Kyoya, suffers a mental breakdown as to how he could lose before fainting from shock. He survives and escapes the destruction of Hades City alongside the rest of Team Star Breaker and other HD bladers after the Spiral Force is stopped by Gingka and Ryuga.
Jack
Voiced by: Koki Uchiyama (Japanese); Scott Gorman (English)
Jack is a loudmouth and also a confident blader among the members of Star Breaker. Jack normally loudmouths his opponents and exploits his abilities to prove his worth. He is their second most powerful blader. He also draws a picture in the Middle of the BeyStadium and traps his opponents and names the picture after the blader is defeated. He is insane and loves to paint things that don't make sense. Evidently, his masterpiece or "painting" is never completed thanks to Tsubasa Otori.
Zeo Abyss
Voiced by: Atsushi Abe (Japanese); M. Christan Heywood (English)
An original member of Team Dungeon, beginning it with his two best friends Toby and Masamune. In Metal Masters, from his introduction in Episode 33 until the Hades City/Spiral Force arc of the series (Eps. 45-51), he is a member of the United States representative team, Team Starbreaker. He reappears in Metal Fury with a new outfit and a new bey, Screw Fox. Zeo is also one of two characters in the Metal Saga (the other being King from Metal Fury), to share a name with a character from the Beyblade original series. Coincidentally, Zeo and King from the original series both appear in V-Force, the second season of that saga.
Toby
Voiced by: Koki Miyata (Japanese); Benjamin Israel (English)
The original leader of Team Dungeon, beginning it with his two best friends Zeo and Masamune. As revealed by Zeo during Episode 37, shortly before the events of "Seeking the Legend" (the first episode of Metal Masters), Toby passed out while training with Masamune and Zeo, which resulted in a hospitalization and turned out to be a life-threatening condition and had stayed in a hospital and later in a wheelchair. In that episode, Zeo claimed that Masamune abandoned him and Toby, and met a man named Dr. Ziggurat shortly thereafter. Ziggurat recruited Zeo to HD Academy in an attempt to cure Toby's illness, and Zeo accepted. Toby was later shown in Episode 45 as he alter ego, Faust when Ziggurat was introducing Faust, his bey Basalt Horogium 145WD, and revealing to the world his invention known as the Spiral Force. Toby was freed from this arrangement at the end of Galaxy Heart, the season finale of Metal Masters
Aguma
Voiced by: Susumu Chiba (Japanese); Brian Drummond (English)
A Legendary Blader, specifically a Solar System Blader and descendant of the Beylin Fist. Aguma was a former antagonist, who originally sided with Nemesis, just his ancestor did, after meeting Johannes.
King
Voiced by: Mutsumi Tamura (Japanese); Christopher Jacot (English)
One of the Legendary Bladers, specifically a Solar System Blader who represents the planet Mars. He is an enthusiastic blader who loves to battle with his heart.
Dynamis
Voiced by: Hikaru Midorikawa (Japanese); Dan Petronijevic (English)
A Legendary Blader, specifically a Solar System Blader and guardian of a temple at the peak of Mist Mountain.
Chris
Voiced by: Tatsuhisa Suzuki (Japanese); Jeremy From (English)
A Legendary Blader, specifically part of the Bladers of the Four Seasons. He battles fiercely with fire in his heart. Chris was a former antagonist, who originally sided with Nemesis after meeting Johannes.
Tithi
Voiced by: Satomi Arai (Japanese); Amera Atiyeh (English)
A Legendary Blader, specifically a Solar System Blader, representing the planet Venus.
Bao
Voiced by: Takuma Terashima (Japanese); Peter Cugno (English)
A descendant of the Beylin Fist and Aguma's partner.
Rago
Voiced by: Toshiyuki Morikawa (Japanese); Andrew Jackson (English)
The main antagonist of Metal Fury. Known as the Child of Nemesis, he was partly responsible for the Nemesis Crisis that almost plummeted the world into destruction and is also a Legendary Blader who fought against the others. Upon transforming into Nemesis, Gingka ultimately destroyed him and plummeted him into a bottomless pit hidden by darkness. As a result, he was declared deceased and the Nemesis Crisis ended at last.
Pluto
Voiced by: Toshiyuki Toyonaga (Japanese); Carey Wass (English)
One of the main antagonists of Metal Fury. He is a mysterious person who wants to resurrect Nemesis. He fused into the evil Nemesis along with Rago.

== Other characters ==
Blader DJ
The WBBA's referee initiates the countdown phrase and comments every match.
Ryutaro Fukami
Voiced by: Hiro Yūki (Japanese); Shawn Meunier (English)
Ryutaro is a blader and fortuneteller.
Tetsuya Watarigani
Voiced by: Ken'ichi Fujiwara (Japanese); Scott McCord (English)
A blader who often uses tricks to win battles, as well as to scratch the beys of his opponents, Tetsuya believes that friendship is useless, based on an experience in which he was betrayed by his best friend.
Teru Saotome
Voiced by: Nobuhiko Okamoto (Japanese); Scott Gorman (English)
A blader and former ballet dancer, Teru became a blader after he broke his right foot, which ruined his dancing career. While recovering at the hospital, all he could do was watch TV, through which he was introduced to and fell in love with Beyblade. He especially enjoyed Gingka's battles. A friend who saw how much he enjoyed Beyblade gave him his own bey, Virgo, so that he could become a blader as good as Gingka.
Tobio Oike
Voiced by: Akira Ishida (Japanese); Matthew Hawkins (English)
Often called Capitan Capri, he acts like a soldier/sniper while he launches his Storm Capricorne like shooting a gun.
Sora Akatsuki
Voiced by: Machiko Kawana (Japanese); Bill Houston (English)
A hyperactive, impulsive, and intense Blader. He took part in a Battle Bladers Challenge Match and befriended Kenta that led him to meet Gingka, and together, they defeated a local gang leader named Busujima. He claims to be Gingka's apprentice.
Helios
Voiced by: Tomoaki Maeno
One of the main characters in the movie.
Bakim
Voiced by: Tesshō Genda
One of the main characters in the movie.
