= Beyblade G-Revolution =

Third season of Japanese anime Beyblade

- Season 3
- The cover of the first DVD compilation of Beyblade G-Revolution.
- No. of episodes: 52

Release
- Original network: TV Tokyo
- Original release: January 6 – December 29, 2003

Season chronology
- ← Previous; V-Force

Beyblade G-Revolution is the third and final season of the 2001 Japanese anime television series Beyblade based on Takao Aoki's manga series of the same name, which itself is based on the Beyblade spinning top game from Takara Tomy. The 52-episode series was produced by Madhouse under the direction of Mitsuo Hashimoto.

The season was first broadcast on TV Tokyo from January 6 to December 29, 2003. The season was licensed for English adaptation, broadcast, and release by Nelvana. The series was broadcast on the sibling cable channel YTV in Canada and ABC Family in the United States in 2004–2005.

The season uses five pieces of theme music: Two opening themes and three ending themes. From episodes 1–31, the first opening theme is Go Ahead (僕らの時代へ -go ahead-, Bokura no Jidai e -go ahead-) by Motoko Kumai while the ending themes are "Oh Yes!!" by Sista with Yuka and Kaze no Fuku Basho (風の吹く場所, lit. The Place Where the Wind Blows) by Makiyo. From episodes 32–52, the second opening theme is "Identified" by Springs while the ending theme is "Sign of Wish" by Makiyo. For episode 52, "Kaze no Fuku Basho" was also used as a special ending theme for the final episode of the series. For the English version, the opening and ending themes are "Let's Beyblade!" by Sick Kid ft. Lukas Rossi.

== Episode list ==
No. overall	No. in season	Title	Original release date	English air date
103	1	"New Kid in Town"; Transliteration: "Takao, shoubu da!" (Japanese: タカオ、勝負だ!)	January 6, 2003	September 18, 2004
Takao, the reigning Beyblade World champion for a second consecutive time, is teaching some boys in the neighborhood how to beyblade using his new Dragoon Galaxy, equipped with the engine gear, a mechanism that activates some clockworks mid-battle to increase the beyblade's spinning velocity. Hiromi and Kyojyu watch from a nearby bench while Kai rests behind them. Rei approaches them to join the audience. Suddenly, a cocky kid named Daichi comes down from the hills and challenges Takao to a battle. The challenger goes for the jugular with his beyblade Gaia Dragoon, which copycats Takao's every move, stealing power from him as the battle progresses. Takao sends Daichi's blade off the stadium, but because it still spins, Daichi refuses to accept defeat and explains that where he comes from, "the whole world is the stadium". Takao eventually wins after some advice from Kai by calling out his Galaxy Storm attack. Daichi is humiliated and begs Takao for a rematch. Takao has had enough of him and is about to walk away when another character appears and challenges him, introducing himself as Jin of the Gale. Max has lunch at his father's and watches the sports news, when the presenter announces Kaichou of BBA is about to make an announcement at a press conference.
104	2	"A Team Divided"; Transliteration: "Tomodachi jane~e!" (Japanese: 友達じゃねぇ!)	January 13, 2003	September 18, 2004
Takao and Jin start a fight and Jin reveals his bit-beast is Death Driger. Daichi immediately joins the fight and both take on Takao. Rei feels forced to interfere as well to aid Takao. The four beyblades head for an all-out attack against each other when Max shows up and tells them to stop. Jin knocks his three opponents out and leaves. Max then announces that the BBA has just announced the World Championship. Kaichou called a press conference to inform all Bladers that this year tag teams will represent the final teams in the championships. Takao grows excited with the new tournament ahead. Daichi follows Takao home and demands a rematch. Takao's Grandfather shows up and invites Daichi for dinner and to sleep. Meanwhile, Max receives a letter from his mother and Rei thinks over the championship at the park where Daichi challenged Takao. The next day, Takao and Kyojyu meet Rei and Max at a training facility and they announce they have decided to leave the Bladebreakers and represent their hometown teams (Baihuzu and All Starz, respectively). Takao is shocked by the news and confronts his friends, but reluctantly agrees to let them go, not without reminding them that they'll still be friends no matter what.
105	3	"Invitation to Battle"; Transliteration: "Ore ni wa katen" (Japanese: オレには勝てん)	January 20, 2003	September 19, 2004
Rei sits and looks at a photograph of him and the Bladebreakers and reflects on his last talk with Takao. Meanwhile, Daichi continues to annoy Takao with constant battle challenges. Takao refuses to accept, especially when Daichi proves to be an impressive and highly skilled Beyblader at a confrontation at the public swimming pool when Takao, Daichi, Kyojyu and Hiromi were being expelled. Takao and Daichi continue to argue on the streets, watched from afar by Jin, who thinks to himself he must test Takao before the World Championship preliminaries. He sends Takao an invitation for a private battle, but Daichi tries to grab it and the invitation flies away. While arguing with Daichi, Takao suddenly realizes that being a World Champion will make people come to him to challenge him and he finally accepts a rematch. Meanwhile, Rei, who was walking by, finds them battling and is glad that Takao finally understood. On his way out, he finds Jin's invitation and decides to go in Takao's place to challenge Jin in a stormy night. Jin's Death Driger proves able to use the water on the ground to create reflections of itself, confusing Rei. He then tells the Bladebreaker that he is "good at everything but isn't great at anything" and that makes him weak. Rei understands and builds a strategy to overcome Jin's illusions, surprising Jin, but he loses anyway, with a lightning striking right in the middle of the beyblades. Jin leaves and tells Rei he doesn't need to battle Takao anymore. Jin then reflects that "there's much work to be done" and that Takao is lucky to have a friend like Rei. In the United States, Max is greeted by his mother as he arrives at the airport. Suddenly, a beyblade storms among the crowd and hits a concrete pillar, damaging it with ease. A tall beyblader then appears, holding a stereo right next to his ear. Judy introduces him to Max as Rick Anderson, the new All Starz recruit. Max tries to politely shake his hand, but Rick simply rejects him and says he wasted his trip by coming to meet him at Judy's request.
106	4	"We Were Once Bladebreakers..."; Transliteration: "Ore no michi wa ore ga kimeru" (Japanese: オレの道はオレが決める)	January 27, 2003	September 25, 2004
Jin confronts Kai atop a building, saying that "Rei and Max have already quit the team". Kai responds by saying only he can decide his path. At home, Takao reflects about Max and Rei while his grandfather tries to make him understand why they left. Takao then leaves and finds Hiromi looking at Kyojyu through a window - he is building himself a new beyblade to compete at the World championship. Meanwhile, both Rei and Max are going through the growing pains of being part of a new team. Rei, back with his old Baihuzu friends from his hometown, re-unites with his strange mystical sensei, Tao, and unveils his new Driger and takes on all his teammates at once. In the United States, Rick is seen in an alley battling in an underground tournament where people gamble. He shatters his opponent's beyblade to pieces. Max, Michael and Eddie then appear and confront him over skipping the team's training schedule to take part of such tournament. Rick's badmouthing of All Starz enrages Eddie and they get into a fight. the match ends in a tie. Rick then walks away and stomps his own beyblade, while the crowd boozes. Rick says it is the beyblader who makes a difference during a battle, not the beyblade, and Max responds by stating it takes heart to be a good fighter. As the preliminaries are about to start, Takao and Daichi realize they haven't signed for the competition yet, so they rush for the enlisting section. There, they are confronted by Jin, who says he will not enlist for the competition because he has other concerns and asks Takao about the "promise" they have made in the past. Takao then remembers Kai, who was supposed to be his partner, and finds out he never signed for the competition. Takao rushes out of the stadium to search for Kai, but he arrives at the last minute and signs.
107	5	"A League of His Own"; Transliteration: "100-Nen hayai ze!" (Japanese: 100年早いぜ!)	February 3, 2003	September 26, 2004
The preliminaries for the World Championship are about to start and DJ Jazzman explains that the competitors were divided into Blocks A and B, and the winners of each block will form a tag team to compete in the finals. At a still empty stadium, Takao reflects on the beginning of the tournament and again meets Jin, but he just disappears in a blink of an eye, only to reappear further around a corner. He is later seen with Kaichou, discussing the Bladebreaker's future. When the games begin, Takao, Kai and Daichi advance with ease, and so does Kyojyu, impressing Takao. Nobody thinks anything when a fan and competitor named Kotaro asks for an autograph and takes advantage of the opportunity to examine Takao's, Kyojyu's and Daichi's Beyblades. Kyojyu is the first of the three to battle him, despite his injured arm. Kotaro unveils his beyblade, Chameleon Fake, which is able to disguise itself as the opponent's beyblade, and knocks Kyojyu's beyblade out of the beystadium. The team then realizes the rouse of asking for an autograph was to examine the beyblades. Takao is the next to fight him and Kotaro proves able to mimic Dragoon's special attack. Kyojyu then tells Takao that Kotaro is unlikely to be able to keep up the attack for much longer, and Takao uses the true Galaxy Storm attack to win the match.
108	6	"You're The Man, Kai!"; Transliteration: "Kai shika ine~e!" (Japanese: カイしかいねぇ!)	February 10, 2003	October 2, 2004
There's only one round left in the tournament to decide who's going to partner up with Takao in the World Beyblade Tag Team Championships and it's between Daichi and Kai. Takao is once again confronted by Jin and reflects about his words later in the backstage. Meanwhile, Daichi is furious that he won't have a chance to take on Takao and will instead form a tag team with him in case he beats Kai (who's overhearing the conversation), but decides to fight anyway. When the match begins, a radical jungle dish is unveiled and expected to give Daichi the edge. Quickly, the underdog starts slamming and attacking Kai while Kai simply looks down and allows multiple hits, even when Takao and his friends nervously yell out for him to react. Suddenly, he finally makes a move and defeats Daichi in one swoop. After the battle, Kai is announced as Takao's partner for the Tag Team Finals, but Kaichou makes an announcement that their new team, the BBA Revolution, will have two alternate players selected and announced by Jin - Daichi and Kyojyu, who was chosen over Kotaro due to the latter's cheating. Jin finally reveals his face and true name: he is actually Hiro, Takao's older brother who has come back to coach Takao and his team, now renamed as BBA Revolution.
109	7	"Take Your Best Shot!"; Transliteration: "Omae shidaida" (Japanese: オマエしだいだ)	February 17, 2003	October 3, 2004
The final match of the Block A of the American leg of the World Championship is about to take place and Max faces off against All Starz's Emily. He defeats his teammate and tries to comfort her, but she is too frustrated and goes bitter on him. In the final round of Block B, Rick unveils his new beyblade Rock Bison and makes short work of Michael with his new special attack Drop Rock. The ex-leader of the All Starz then leaves with Eddie and Emily, feeling rejected and useless now that Max and Rick will form the tag team - now renamed as PPB All Starz - though Rick is still cocky about having Max as a partner. The finals of the Russian tournament also take place and Yuri defeats Sergei for the Block A, paving the way for the return of the Neo Borg team. The match is broadcast live and the BBA Revolution watch - Kai shows a slight interest in the battle. Later, they begin practicing for the finals. Then, the final match of the Chinese Block B is about to take place between Rei and Lee, who's got a new Galeon. However, Rei totally controls the battle and knocks Galeon out with his new special attack Gatling Claw. Lee congratulates him on the victory and admits Rei's superiority, but Rei turns cold on him and says he should have tried harder and should be more upset about losing. Kai watches as his friends Max and Rei win the final matches of their respective blocks for other teams. This causes him to question his loyalty to Takao. In the end of the episode, it is revealed that the Majestiks were eliminated from the championship by a new team composed of unknown beybladers, the Barthez Battalion, causing Takao and the others to be suspicious of them.
110	8	"Roughing It"; Transliteration: "Gasshukuja nē!" (Japanese: 合宿じゃねぇ!)	February 24, 2003	October 9, 2004
The BBA Revolution Team heads to a remote training camp to prepare for the upcoming tournament. When they first arrive, Kai is seemingly uninterested and Hiro deduces he is about to leave the team. Kai walks away from him without saying a word and Hiro realizes he was right. He then tells his younger brother about Kai's defection. Takao makes himself ready to quit too, but Hiro convinces him to choose a new partner. Takao then picks Daichi, and they cruise into the wilderness to teach him survival skills as they relate to Beyblading. The plan works well until Takao strays from the main path, and gets himself and Daichi hopelessly lost. They then fall into a river, losing most of their supplements, and eventually get trapped by a raging forest fire. Only by working together, and using their Beyblades in perfect unison, can they save themselves and the forest - which they manage to do in the end, by joining forces and creating a water tornado. Takao finally realizes that Daichi does in fact have what it takes to be his partner in the championship tournament. Kai is shown meeting Yuri, who greets him as the new Neo Borg member.
111	9	"Swiped On The Streets"; Transliteration: "1 + 1 Wa bugendaida ze!" (Japanese: 1+1は無限大だぜ!)	March 3, 2003	October 16, 2004
The BBA Revolution team fly to New York City for the first round of the Beyblade World Championships. The six teams that qualified will play each other in a round-robin format, and the two teams with most wins will battle each other for the trophy. While training, Max is bullied by the eliminated PPB All Starz members. As the BBA Revolution arrive in New York City, Daichi is jealous of Takao getting so much attention from fans and the media, and he's also overwhelmed by the size and scope of things in the Big Apple. He and Takao visit the Statue of Liberty and a game of baseball. While eating lunch in a sidewalk café, Takao and Daichi have their beyblades stolen by a young pickpocket as he was pretending to help Takao clean off his clothes after Daichi spilled some beverage on it. Together they begin scouring the streets for the culprit since they failed to notice the robbery at the time it happened. Just as the pair are about to give up the search, Takao hears the unmistakable sounds of Dragoon coming from a nearby alley. There, they find the boy who robbed them using Dragoon to battle Rick in a street match. Rick wins and prepares to leave with his stolen bounty. Takao and Daichi try to convince Rick to give back their blades, but Rick will only return them if they defeat him in a match. The three bladers engage in battle, with Takao and Daichi tag-teaming Rick. Rick is on the verge of defeating them when Max jumps in. The match ends in a draw, and Rick leaves empty-handed. Max vows to try to improve his relationship with Rick after seeing Takao and Daichi playing together as a tag team. Back at their Hotel, the BBA Revolution team watch the sports news on TV, and learn that the other teams in the Championship Tournament have all arrived in New York City. Takao is surprised to find out about Kai joining the Neo Borg team.
112	10	"It's a Battle Royale...!"; Transliteration: "Matomete kiya gare!" (Japanese: まとめてきやがれ!)	March 10, 2003	October 17, 2004
The first round of the finals of the World Championship is about to begin and the six teams are introduced: BBA Revolution, PPB All Starz, Baihuzu, Barthez Battalion, F Sangre (an unknown pair of young beybladers) and the Neo Borg. The first match is randomly decided via a draw and the BBA Revolution will face off against Baihuzu. Takao is uncomfortable with this, and is more disturbed to see Kai with the Neo Borg. After confronting his ex-teammate, Kai suggests to Takao that the reason he left is because his old team just wasn't good enough. Takao is insulted and Kai walks away. At the BBA Revolution preparing room, the team discusses the match - without Takao. As the match begins, Lee is sent to face off against Takao, who is infuriated with Rei supposedly backing away from the match. He grabs Blader DJ's microphone and challenges Rei for a match in which he'll take on Rei and Lee all at once. Daichi wants to join in and Blader DJ asks Kaichou if he's OK with that. Kaichou gives thumbs up for the match and it begins in a stadium filled with pointy spears that alternatively project in and out of the ground. While Rei and Lee feel at home with the stadium, Takao and Daichi struggle with it and have difficulties fighting together. Hostilities develop mid-battle between the BBA Revolution members; this gives the Baihuzu an opportunity to finish them off. Takao watches shocked as Dragoon and Gaia Dragoon are thrown out of the dish. Rei says he is disappointed with Takao and Hiro reflects on his brother's attitude.
113	11	"The Blame Game"; Transliteration: "Ore ga Warui n janē!" (Japanese: オレが悪いんじゃねえ!)	March 17, 2003	October 23, 2004
Takao blames his embarrassing loss to Rei on Daichi, telling the team he is better off competing alone. As Takao runs away, the United States leg continues with the Neo Borg facing off against the F Sangre. After an unseen battle between Yuri and Julia (which ended with the latter's defeat), Kai fights Raul, who tries to hold on with his Torch Pegasus, but ends easily knocked out by the new Dranzer Gigs. In the next and final match, Claude of the Barthez Battalion is sent to battle Rick and receives instructions from his coach Barthez via a headset. Claude's skill gives him the upper hand until Rick's unleashes his full power. Rick hits one of the spears and sends it flying towards Claude. He prepares to dodge it, but Barthez orders him to stand still. He is subsequently hit by the object. With his player badly injured, Barthez announces he'll have to forfeit the match and has the crowd turn against the PPB All Starz. It was all a plan to earn "the hearts and minds" of the audience. Max then defeats Aaron in a almost totally unseen match. Meanwhile, Hiro finds Takao, who blames Daichi for his loss. Hiro then challenges him to a duel, winning easily after deploying two twin beyblades. Hiro tells Takao he needs to realize he's not so good and walks away.
114	12	"When in Rome... Let it Rip!"; Transliteration: "Gyakuten geki no Makuakeda" (Japanese: 逆転劇の幕開けだ)	March 24, 2003	October 30, 2004
Coach Barthez is seen talking to an unknown person on the phone, saying he may ask for another "favor". Then, Takao, Daichi, Hiromi and Kyojyu are seen having lunch, with Takao still frustrated with his defeat. They decide to turn on the TV to see what's on the news and they do it just in time to see an announcement about the World Championship: the next round will be in Italy, and the matches will be: Baihuzu x Barthez Battalion, PPB All Starz x F Sangre and BBA Revolution x Neo Borg. Takao is surprised that he will have to face Kai so soon and leaves the room determined to win. Meanwhile, Barthez busily prepares his team for the big event. He has invited a television news crew to document his efforts as a coach. However, after the TV crew leaves, it is revealed that Barthez is actually a ruthless coach who's not above physically abusing his players to keep them disciplined. As the first match begins, Rei goes up against Claude. In mere seconds, Rei pulls off a victory. The second battle has Lee and Miguel pitted against each other. It doesn't take long for Miguel to win the match for Barthez Battalion - using his Bitbeast chip to reflect light right into Lee's eyes, causing him to weaken his special attack, leaving Galeon vulnerable for Miguel's final attack. This outcome sets up the tie-breaker - Miguel against Rei. The match takes place on a stadium full of wires. This battle starts off with Rei on the offensive, but suddenly, blades spring out of Miguel's blade (unnoticed for all the other spectators and to Rei himself) and damage a wire where Driger was riding. As Driger approaches the damaged part of the wire, the wire breaks and the beyblade falls in the middle of the stadium, losing balance before a confused Rei. He manages to hold on and tries to make one more attack on Miguel, but Driger gets inexplicably thrown out of the stadium as it tries to hit Miguel's Death Gargoyle. Barthez congratulates Miguel for his victory but the beyblader is not glad to have won by cheating. Kyojyu, watching this on a monitor, is very suspicious of the victory just as Hiro enters to give the line-up for the next battle against the Neo Borg: Daichi and Kyojyu. Takao is shocked that he won't have a chance to face Kai.
115	13	"Kenny's Big Battle"; Transliteration: "Kyōju wa Kyōju da!" (Japanese: キョウジュはキョウジュだ!)	March 31, 2003	November 6, 2004
Takao gets in a huff and leaves the team room after he is dropped from the lineup against the Neo Borg. This leaves Kyojyu and Daichi to pick up the slack against their opponents. Feeling rejected, Takao wanders off and runs into Baihuzu's strange coach Tao who takes him on a shopping spree. Meanwhile, the competition rolls on and the PPB All Stars face the F Sangre. Under a booing audience, Rick and Max defeat Raul and Julia (who are revealed to be siblings), respectively. Next up, the Neo Borg face off against the BBA Revolution without Takao. Kai and Daichi go first, but Kai simply forces his own beyblade out of the stadium right towards Hiro's head, missing it by mere centimeters. Dranzer then flies back to him and he leaves the dish after exchanging looks with his opponents' coach. Kyojyu then reflects on this move and nervously goes to the beystadium to face his opponent Yuri. Takao watches at a restaurant and realizes he should be there, supporting his friend. He then rushes to the stadium, where Kyojyu finds himself way out of his league. But when Hiro gives him some words of encouragement and Yuri starts insulting Takao, he discovers his blading spirit and vows to never give up and win the match for his friend.
116	14	"Picking Up The Pieces"; Transliteration: "Ore ni yara sero!" (Japanese: オレにやらせろ!)	April 7, 2003	November 7, 2004
In the second match, Yuri thinks he's broken Kyojyu down, but Kyojyu summons his inner strength and attacks with all of his combined power. However, it's not enough, and Yuri shatters Kyojyu's Einstein to pieces with his Novae Rog attack. Kyojyu loses the match, but in the process spots a major weakness in Yuri's game. Daichi is called to take on Yuri in the tie-breaker. Takao is desperate for the win, and tries to convince Yuri to let him fight in Daichi's place. Yuri refuses, and Daichi is furious that Takao has so little faith in his abilities. Meanwhile, Kyojyu rigs Daichi's Beyblade with a special part to help him in the battle. He convinces Daichi to follow his game plan, and stay away from Yuri's blade until the perfect moment. Daichi agrees, but it goes against his natural style and it takes all his strength just to keep from attacking. Yuri unleashes his special attack, but Daichi dodges it. Finally Kyojyu spots the opening, and Daichi defeats a shocked Yuri, awarding the BBA Revolution their first victory. Takao is humbled, and vows never to underestimate his teammates again. Meanwhile, F Sangre pay Kaichou a visit and ask him to allow them to make tag team matches.
117	15	"Sleepless in Madrid"; Transliteration: "Pātonā daro!?" (Japanese: パートナーだろ!?)	April 14, 2003	November 13, 2004
In Madrid for the Spanish leg of the World Championships, the hard-of-sleeping Lee has a nightmare that Rei kicks him off the team for his poor play. The day before their next match, Baihuzu encounters a pair of beyblading jugglers (unbeknownst to them, they're Raul and Julia) in Madrid's main square, who also happen to be trick bladers. When Lee criticizes their performance, the duo challenge he and Rei to an impromptu match. The jugglers beat them handily, which only exacerbates Lee's insecurity about his skills, leading him to faint. Rei suspects that Lee's problem stems not only from a lack of sleep lately, but from a lack of communication between the two. He discusses the problem with Takao, who suggests he tries to be more confrontational. Kaichou meanwhile grants F Sangre permission for a two-on-two match. When the day of the match arrives, and Baihuzu faces F Sangre, Lee and Rei discover the jugglers' true identities. Wanting payback for their earlier loss, Lee and Rei accept the two-on-two challenge and the match format is set. F Sangre dominates the contest, causing Lee to lose his mind in fear of letting Rei down yet again. Rei has Driger knock Galeon out himself to spare his friend from further distress, but ends up losing as well in the process. Discussing the incident afterward, Lee acknowledges his mistake, and he and Rei vow to be more communicative in the future.
118	16	"Fire and Water"; Transliteration: "Jama suru na!" (Japanese: 邪魔するな!)	April 21, 2003	November 20, 2004
As Max prepares to face Kai in the next round, the members of BBA Revolution overhear a confrontation between Johnny and Robert of the Majestiks and Barthez Battalion. It turns out Barthez Battalion won their qualifying tournament through trickery. Thanks to Kyojyu, who has footage of Miguel's illegal blades used against Rei, the teams find proof of Barthez's underhanded tactics, but Rick and Max advises them that it is too late to disqualify them from the Championships and start everything over again. The match between Kai and Max is about to start and the stadium is revealed to have three sets of energized bull horns with enough power to throw a beyblade out of the dish. Armed with his new Draciel Gravity, Max takes Kai to the edge of defeat only to end up defeated himself, though he had a chance of knocking Kai out by using the electric horns. Rick is frustrated that Max didn't take advantage of the stadium and uses his rage to overcome Yuri with ease. In the tiebreaker, Rick slams Kai with full force and even manages to use the stadium's horns in his favour, but Kai holds his own as they unleash their special attacks and defeats Rick. Inspired by the match, Takao vows to face Barthez Battalion with everything he's got.
119	17	"Same Old Dirty Tricks..."; Transliteration: "Kiwotsukero, Daichi" (Japanese: 気をつけろ、大地)	April 28, 2003	November 27, 2004
Barthez Battalion's popularity grows as they are about to face off against the BBA Revolution. However, Mathilda is hesitant about fighting for some reason. Meanwhile, Hiromi and Kyojyu want to report their dirty deeds to the authorities, but Takao believes the best way to teach them a lesson is to beat them fair and square. As the match begins, Mathilda is first against Daichi. The BBA Revolution blader seems to have the upper hand and releases his special attack, Vurst Hurricane. Mathilda then secretly forces her own beyblade, Pierce Hedgehog, to self-destruct, much to everyone's surprise. Subsequently, Daichi's own attack causes his opponent's blade pieces to collide with Gaia Dragoon, severely damaging it. Barthez plan was to have Miguel defeat Takao, forcing a third, tie-breaking match, which would be inviable due to Gaia Dragoon being so damaged, which would in turn force the BBA Revolution to forfeit the match. However, Miguel decides to reject cheating and fights according to the rules, eventually losing but still feeling relieved. Barthez, however, is frustrated and wows to make Miguel pay for disobeying him.
120	18	"Beyblade Like an Egyptian"; Transliteration: "Ii kao shiteru ne!" (Japanese: いい顔してるね!)	May 5, 2003	December 4, 2004
The Egyptian round of the World Championship is about to begin and a TV sports program announces the upcoming matches: Neo Borg vs. Barthez Battalion, PPB All Starz vs. Baihuzu and BBA Revolution vs. F Sangre. Barthez is disappointed with Mathilda and Miguel, so he chooses Claude and Aaron for the match against the Neo Borg. Meanwhile, Kyojyu unveils a new Gaia Dragoon he's been working on, equipped with the engine gear. Daichi is initially reluctant about using a beyblade other than his former one, but he tests it against a local kid and easily wins, amazed with its power. Meanwhile, Barthez is having his beyblades verified and comments on how stupid such verification processes are, since he can simply replace the legal blades after the test. As he readies his team, he explains that he's devised a special spider web-like tape that is activated via a remote control and is supposed to shoot out of his team's blades and trap their opponents in an inescapable web. Miguel is torn and knows that if they follow his coach's plan they could win, but he feels he'd rather lose with respect than cheat. In the first battle, Aaron goes up against Yuri and both are nervous - Yuri for having lost his two previous matches, and Aaron because of Barthez. Yuri soon overcomes and holds his ground against Aaron. Barthez tries to unleash the web, but nothing happens. It becomes known that Aaron refused to use the 'fixed' blade and loses while using his original blade, enraging Barthez. Miguel has it with the coach and sacks him. Barthez tries to punch Miguel, but he reminds him that he is in front of thousands of people and Barthez stops. Barthez leaves and warns Miguel that he stands no chance without him. Miguel steps into the ring against Kai and gives everything he's got, developing gargoyle wings and a dark look on his face and setting Dranzer on fire. Kai then asks him if he was really thinking he could defeat Dranzer with "such flames", breaks free from the fire and unleashes Blazing Gig, throwing Dark Gargoyle out of the stadium. Despite his defeat, Miguel is congratulated by the entire audience, his teammates and Kai himself. They leave the dish to prepare for their fifth match in the next round as Barthez lies knelled to the ground, frustrated and confused that people adore Miguel despite his loss. Also, with three wins, the Neo Borg is the first team to advance to the finals.
121	19	"One For All... Free For All!"; Transliteration: "NOーーーTsu!!" (Japanese: NOーーーッ!!)	May 12, 2003	December 11, 2004
Rick and Max have an argument over Max's defeat to Kai. Rick thinks Max lost on purpose, but Max explains he was just trying to be fair. Meanwhile, the BBA Revolution team check on the results table to see who's out and who's got a chance to advance. Bahuzu is seen shopping in a street market and Mariah eventually meets Rick battling amateur bladers in an alley. They talk about the meaning of Beyblade until Rei and Lee arrive and Rick mocks them for not being so tough. Later, as the battle is about to begin, Max demands they fight a two-on-two match so that he and Rick are forced to work as a team. Rick doesn't react well to the proposal, but Bahuzu accept the terms and they head for the stadium. Rick's ego gets the best of him and he deliberately ignores Max's recommendations, eventually sending Galeon to collide with Draciel. Max is frustrated with Rick and eventually the two find themselves battling each other, with Max eventually unleashing his special attack on Rock Bison. Rei and Lee take the chance to use their special moves against Rick too, but, much to everyone's surprise, Rock Bison resist them all. Mariah then tells Rei and Lee that they should all battle each other and find out who is the best blader out of the four of them. Lee is initially reluctant, but Rei starts slamming him and he is soon convinced, though the audience is confused. A beyblading free for all ensues until the final climactic battle when only one blade is left spinning. The winner, Lee, is surprised that he was the last man standing and Rick finally learns to beyblade for the fun of it, not just to win.
122	20	"Burdens of a Champion"; Transliteration: "Makeru na yo…Takao" (Japanese: 負けるなよ…タカオ)	May 19, 2003	December 18, 2004
Inspired by the previous match, Takao has Daichi practice tag-team attacks with him, which they are not used to. F Sangre is renowned for their tag-team abilities, and Takao wants nothing more than to beat them at their own game. Meanwhile, F Sangre foregoes practicing in favor of another public show of their beyblading skills for a crowd of onlookers. In a flashback to their childhood, it is revealed that Raul and Julia were raised by a circus traveling group and practiced hard since their childhood to become part of the act. They seemed unable to do the simplest of the tricks, until Romero introduced them to the world of beyblading. When the day of the match arrives, Takao specifically requests the two-on-two format and F Sangre agrees. The sand-filled Sahara dish gives Takao and Daichi the pre-battle advantage, but during the match, Takao's beyblade has trouble keeping up. Coach Hiro realizes that the pressure Takao is feeling to carry his team as the former Beyblade champion is affecting his performance. Takao eventually gets back in the game and unleashes a twin tornado attack with Daichi. When it seems they are about to win, Takao loses pace and the tornado is gone, leaving them vulnerable. Raul and Julia pull off another spectacular tag-team assault and defeat Takao and Daichi.
123	21	"Under Pressure"; Transliteration: "Dasadasada ze!" (Japanese: ダサダサだぜ!)	May 26, 2003	December 25, 2004
The World Championship reaches its fifth and final round in Australia. The final matches will be F Sangre vs. Barthez Battalion; Neo Borg vs. Bahuzu and BBA Revolution vs. PPB All Starz. Takao is feeling the pressure of being World Champion but, despite Hiro's warning, a television crew follows him around for a day, taping his every move. The TV crew eventually ask Takao to have a fight and a three-way match is held between Takao, Daichi and Kyojyu, with Takao struggling to keep up and eventually losing like an amateur. Takao contemplates quitting and wanders to the Beystadium to be alone with his thoughts. Daichi confronts him and challenges him to a match. During the beybattle, Takao is reminded of how it feels to beyblade for the pure love of the game and the pressure disappears when he realizes he doesn't have to beyblade like a champion. Takao later meets Kai, Max and Rei on top of the Uluru and tells them that, from now on, they are all challengers and any one of them could end up as champion.
124	22	"Sibling Rivalry"; Transliteration: "Antanara kateru!" (Japanese: アンタなら勝てる!)	June 2, 2003	January 1, 2005
The final elimination round is underway, with F Sangre trying to earn the last play-off slot, while their opponents, the already mathematically eliminated Barthez Battalion, try to spoil their chances by heading to the stadium for the first time without their coach Barthez. Feeling like the weak link of the team, Raul surprises Julia during a meal by insisting he battles solo for F Sangre, in order to prove his worth. Julia reluctantly agrees though she blames Raul for their first two defeats. In the first match, Julia easily defeats Miguel in a grass stadium filled with trees and with the entire audience's support, piling even more pressure on Raul. The Barthez Battalion then decide to send Mathilda for the next match. Since her beyblade was destroyed in her previous match with Daichi, her three friends decide to create a new beyblde using parts of their own beyblades: Death Gargoyle's attack ring, Rushing Boar's weight disk and Killer Eagle's base. Mathilda then completes it with her bit beast chip (Pierce Hedgehog). In the second match, Raul freezes under the pressure, and it looks like he is a sitting duck. But Julia steps in to explain to Raul that the only reason she has so much confidence in battle is because she has him at her side. This fires Raul up, and he battles back to steal the victory. The Barthez Battalion team are eliminated, but they are very gracious in defeat. As for Raul, he feels confident and Julia is proud of him. The next match is between Bahuzu and the Neo Borg, with Yuri and Lee battling each other for the first game. As they launch their beybldes, Lee has Galeon slam Wolborg with full force, but Yuri simply smiles and thinks to himself that Lee is wasting his energy and will soon be under his mercy.
125	23	"Ray and Kai: The Ultimate Face-Off..."; Transliteration: "Madada…!" (Japanese: まだだ…!)	June 9, 2003	January 8, 2005
Yuri easily defeats Lee and the Bahuzu member desolately leaves the dish. Rei comforts his teammate and the entire Bahuzu team rip off small parts of their clothes and tie them to Rei's left arm before he faces off against his former Bladebreaker colleague Kai. Takao and his teammates discuss the battle. As the match begins in a stadium filled with aboriginal totems, they seem to be at par, but when they unleash their special attacks, Rei collapses. Blader DJ is ready to declare Kai as the winner, but the Bahuzu team grabs hold of him and point the still-spinning Driger. Rei finds his remaining strength and attacks Kai with everything he's got. Kai then mentions a special attack he has been developing and Yuri recalls confronting Kai as he returned from an uninformed activity. Kai simply ignored him and Yuri noticed his arm was full of scars. Yuri then followed Kai's footsteps on the snow and found a gigantic rock cut in half - now he realizes all that damage was caused by Kai testing his new attack. However, Rei also has a new move of his own, the Gatling Claw Maximum: he uses it against Kai, but Kai releases Blazing Gig Tempest, which sends a severely damaged Driger out of the stadium. Rei falls, but Lee catches him and congratulates him on his fight, as well as his friends, which are all proud of him despite being eliminated. Kai then leaves as if it has been an easy match, but at the corridor he succumbs to exhaustion and checks on his highly damaged Dranzer, congratulating Rei and confident that he is ready to take on Takao.
126	24	"Down Under Thunder!"; Transliteration: "Pawā zenkaida!!" (Japanese: パワー全開だ!!)	June 16, 2003	January 15, 2005
The tournament in Australia continues and this round pits the PPB All Starz against the BBA Revolution. Daichi is frustrated that Takao is still getting most of the attention. He leaves for the toilet and his teammates begin to reflect on his importance to the team. Yuri meets Daichi on his way out of the toilet and asks him to reach the final so they can have a rematch. The first battle sees Daichi playing against Rick. Daichi seems a little overconfident going into battle as his sights are set on fighting in the finals with Takao. Rick on the other hand is battling for the first time as a real PPB All Starz, counting on his teammates' support, and he reflects on his origins before the match, realizing he's lucky to be where he is, yet he too wants to get this battle behind him. The battle is so intense that the entire arena is filled with the acrid smell of burnt metal. In the end, Daichi proves to be the winner before succumbing to exhaustion in front of a devastated Rick. Now it's time for the next round, and it pits Takao against his former teammate, Max.
127	25	"Max Attacks!"; Transliteration: "GOーーーtsu!!" (Japanese: GOーーーッ!!)	June 23, 2003	January 22, 2005
Rick is frustrated on his loss and Max promises to keep the PPB All Starz on the championship. Takao and Max then face off against each other in the Ayers Rock stadium, which reminds them of their meeting in a previous episode (see episode 21). The two old friends use two totally different blading styles in the dish. Takao takes the offense while Max hangs back and chooses for a more defensive style. Takao has a tough time battling Max and when Dragoon starts to lose power he starts his engine gear. When he goes in for the final hit, Max suddenly goes on the offense and starts Draciel's engine gear. Hiro advises Takao to finish the battle as fast as possible, and Takao pushes Max to the edge of the stadium. Max manages to hold on and strikes back, eventually releasing his special attack Gravity Control. Just when it looks like Dragoon is going to be knocked out, Takao manages to have Dragoon surf Draciel's waves and then unleashes a second Galaxy Storm, defeating Max and eliminating him from the competition. This allows the BBA Revolution, to move on to the final round of the competition. Takao congratulates Max and asks him to be his friend again. Max's friends comfort him and Judy is glad that they did their best and that Rick is finally getting along with the team. Yuri and Kai watch from afar and Kai wows to defeat Takao in the final. On his way out of the stadium, Takao checks on his severely damaged Dragoon and comments on how Max didn't let him win without a struggle.
128	26	"Familiar Faces"; Transliteration: "Yossha!" (Japanese: よっしゃー!)	June 30, 2003	January 29, 2005
The Neo Borg, the BBA Revolution, and F Sangre arrive in Japan for the finals of the World Championship, though the BBA is yet to determine how they will compete for the title. With the PPB All Starz eliminated from the tournament, Max visits his father and then drops by the local community center where he meets Rei and recalls telling Takao at that very place that they were leaving the Bladebreakers. Takao goes home to visit Grandpa, and Daichi tags along. Grandpa is impressed by Takao's newfound seriousness when it comes to his martial arts training. Coach Romero of F Sangre gives Raul and Julia a surprise when he brings them to visit the circus, which just happens to be in town. At the BBA Headquarters, Kaichou discusses the finals format with Hiro, Romero and Yuri. They agree that the Neo Borg, with four wins and one lose, should advance to the final match; while the BBA Revolution and the F Sangre, tied with three wins and two losses, must battle in a play-off match to determine who's taking on Neo Borg. Takao surprises everyone at the press conference by requesting that his match be a tag-team battle. Kyojyu gives Takao his newly created Dragoon Galaxy Turbo, an improved version of Dragoon Galaxy, which performs well in tag-team practice. Takao and Daichi test it against Hiro's dual Death Driger and prove they are capable of defeating another team in a tag battle.
129	27	"What a Blast!"; Transliteration: "Saikō ni omoshiroi zo!" (Japanese: 最高に面白いぞ!)	July 7, 2003	February 5, 2005
The entire city is pumped for Takao and Daichi's rematch with F Sangre in double-team play at a stadium with a dragon in the middle of it, providing a kind of a spiral climb. At first, the awesome power of BBA Revolution has Raul and Julia on their heels. Raul manages to save Julia from a stadium out and his big sister lets him take command. Encouraged by the support of their circus family, the siblings use their experience and teamwork to push the BBA Revolution to the brink of defeat, while Romero recalls their union since they've been kids. Takao and Daichi are losing strength when they realize they are having the time of their lives. Daichi releases his special attack Great Cutter and forces his opponents up the dragon pathway, with Takao chasing them, and from where they jump confidently. Then, much to everyone's surprise, Daichi slams Dragon and sends it right towards Torch and Thunder Pegasus. Takao then releases his new special attack Turbo Galaxy Twister and wins the match. Raul and Julia are stunned to hear the crowd cheering for them and are overwhelmed with pride despite their loss.
130	28	"Changing Gears"; Transliteration: "Mada ka yo!" (Japanese: まだかよ!)	July 14, 2003	February 12, 2005
The finals have finally arrived and BBA Revolution gets ready to face the Neo Borg in a heated battle. As the two best teams prepare for the final battle, some of the eliminated participants take part of an exhibition match, involving many beyblades at the same time. Rei and Max try to prolong their battle so Takao has more time to recover from his previous match, but a forgotten Mariah puts an end to the fight, emerging as the winner. Meanwhile, Takao and Daichi take a nap and Kyojyu performs a routine check-up of Dragoon, which turns up a faulty gear assembly. Daichi goes face Yuri and knows he has to stretch out his match so Kyojyu has time to repair Takao's beyblade. Meanwhile, Kai asks Brian and Sergei to help him with something before his match against Takao. Eventually, Yuri figures out his opponent's plan and tries to finish him off, but Kyojyu emerges with the rest of the BBA Revolution and brings the repaired Dragoon. Daichi then tries to finish the match once and for all, but Yuri still has much power left. They end up in a tie, with both of their beyblades visibly damaged. Daichi regrets he didn't win and that his beyblade suffered so much damage, and passes out.
131	29	"And Then There Were Two"; Transliteration: "Ore nara koko da" (Japanese: オレならここだ)	July 21, 2003	February 19, 2005
Because Daichi and Yuri are both exhausted and their beyblades have taken too much damage for a rematch, Kaichou rules that the next match will determine the new tournament Champion. Takao walks up to the dish and a visibly battered and bruised Kai shows up and announces Takao wasn't the only one to have fought that day. He also unveils his new Dranzer Gigs Turbo. Some images of Sergei and Brian passed out and their heavily damaged Fallborg and Seaborg are shown. Everyone deduces he had a fight just so he could have put himself at Takao's level of physical exhaustion. Because of the power levels involved, Kaichou unveils a new stadium dish, a large rocky terrain hidden under the floor of the main stadium, which Blader DJ introduces as "the largest indoor beystadium ever used". Yuri locates his passed out teammates and wonders what was Kai thinking. As the battle starts, both opponents are so determined to win that every time their beyblades collide, energy shock waves are generated and affect the entire stadium and its audience. Kai eventually has Takao fall of the edge and into the stadium. Kai then sets Dranzer on fire and attacks Dragoon, which escapes and generates a tornado, bringing Kai down to the stadium as well. Kai and Takao assemble their final forces and head for the final part of the match.
132	30	"Let the Games Begin... Again!"; Transliteration: "Owari janē!!" (Japanese: 終わりじゃねえ!!)	July 28, 2003	February 26, 2005
The battle continues and the ex-team members unleash everything they've got. When they head for their final attacks, the power is so much that the roof of the stadium is destroyed as their bit beasts emerge to the skies, altering the clouds formations. In the end, both their beyblades have stopped spinning and both are passed out. Takao and Kai recover and prepare to launch their beyblades again, but Kyojyu advises his teammate not to do so before checking Dragoon. Meanwhile, Kaichou has to make the final decision and he's leaning toward calling it a tie because he's afraid that if they continue the battle, someone could get hurt. Kaichou ultimately announces his decision to declare both teams as the winners, but Kai steps up to the plate and pleads his case for the battle to continue. He earns immediate audience support and Kaichou has no choice but to give in. As the fight resumes, it grows so intense that the bladers are sent to another dimension. In the end, after one final attack, both beyblades are still spinning, but showing sights of weakening. Takao almost falls, but manages to keep standing. Kai succumbs and loses. Takao is declared the World Champion for a third time and is greeted by his friends. Kai leaves and recognizes his defeat, stating that if he had to be defeated by anyone, this should have been Takao. Yuri realizes he tried to use Kai to become a World Champion, but in the end it was Kai who used him in order to have one final battle against Takao.
133	31	"Runaway Daichi!"; Transliteration: "Jā na!" (Japanese: じゃあな!)	August 4, 2003	March 5, 2005
Takao is the first athlete to become beyblade champion for a third time and Daichi is jealous that he is getting all the attention. He decides the only way he can get the respect he deserves is to go on a training mission and come back and defeat Takao on his own. Kyojyu eventually meets him and tells him of an upcoming show of popstar Ming-Ming. Later, he hitches a ride on a truck and falls asleep but wakes up far away from home, alone and hungry. Eventually he runs into Max and his father who invite him back to their house for dinner. During the meal Max squirts mustard on Daichi's steak telling him it will make it taste better. This disgusts Daichi, and in his anger he insults Max and his father. Max is offended and challenges Daichi to a Beyblade battle. The match is a close one and Daichi is confident he can beat Max but he ends up beaten himself. He decides that the only way he can become a better Blader is to start training with Max. Meanwhile, Takao discovers Daichi is gone and wonders why and where his blading partner has gone.
134	32	"Beyblade Idol"; Transliteration: "Wake wakan nē!!" (Japanese: わけわかんねえ!!)	August 11, 2003	March 12, 2005
A news bulletin announces that the BBA has been bought to be transformed in a new professional league and Kaichou has resigned from his position as Chairman. Takao, Hiromi and Kyojyu go off in search of their old friend and meet Max and Daichi in front of the former BBA headquarters, which is being demolished. Eventually they meet Kaichou, who reveals that the board of the BBA had completed the plans to sell the league while he was occupied with the World Championships. Takao resolves to show up at the press conference the next day and discover who is behind the plot. The new pro-league is announced by Blader DJ to be BEGA - Beyblde Entertainment Global Association, headquartered in a tall skyscraper built at the BBA's former lot. The kids are soon faced with the new singing sensation, Ming-Ming, who announces that not only is she the official mascot of the BEGA League but also one of its top ranked professional Beybladers. Meanwhile, some men in front of TV screens announce to a shadowy figure that Takao has been located. Back to the press conference, Ming-Ming notices the presence of Max, Daichi and Takao and metamorphoses into a grown up, teenage girl. Afterwards, she shows off her beyblading skills. Takao challenges her to Beybattle and Ming-Ming accepts under the condition that Takao beat her entire Ming-Ming Band. Max and Daichi join him for a three-on-three match. The members perform while beybattling, which gives them extra energy to fight at par with the World Champions. Max eventually realizes their source of energy and figures that all they have to do is to understand the musical pattern. In the end, they defeat the three opponents. Before they can challenge Ming-Ming, the shadowy figure shown before shows up and announces he's the one behind BEGA. The figure then reveals itself to be Boris, the ex-manager of the Biovolt Corporation and the Neo Borg team that Takao and the Bladebreakers had to face in order to become World Champions for the first time (see Beyblade (season 1)).
135	33	"Out of Their League"; Transliteration: "Ayamare!!" (Japanese: あやまれ!!)	August 18, 2003	March 19, 2005
Takao, Max, Kyojyu and Daichi are invited by Boris to take a tour inside his new BEGA headquarters. Hiromi isn't allowed inside until the official public opening. The boys find that the BEGA building is unparalleled in the quality of its Beyblade training and facilities. Takao, however, is still highly distrustful of Boris. Boris tries to convince Takao that he's changed. Ever since his scheme was uncovered, he roamed throughout his homeland doing some soul searching. There, while watching some village children Beyblade, he had an epiphany. He realized that Beyblading is all about honor and individuality, and he made it his new goal to bring Beyblading to the masses. That's why he took over the BBA and turned it into BEGA – as a way to give children around the world that had no exposure to the game a chance to better their lives and become champions themselves. Takao is still skeptical, and his bad-mouthing of Boris draws the ire of another top BEGA prospect – a juggernaut named Moses, whose Beyblade launcher mimics a bazooka. When grilled by Takao about his motives for joining this professional league, Moses admits he's doing it for the prospect of getting rich, but only so he can afford to pay his younger sister's hospital bills. A Beybattle ensues, and Moses shows he's even more powerful than he looks. Meanwhile, two BEGA professionals watch the fight from another floor. Eventually, one of them, named Brooklyn, senses Takao is going to win and leaves. Takao is nearly defeated, but he summons his will and narrowly defeats his jumbo-sized opponent, at the cost of Dragoon's attack ring, that gets severely damaged. When Boris asks Takao if he now believes he's sincere in his reasons for creating BEGA, Takao still isn't sure. But he does admit that if spirited and honorable bladers like Moses are in it, maybe there is some merit in the new league after all.
136	34	"The Mysterious Mystel..."; Transliteration: "Kimi no na wa…" (Japanese: キミの名は…)	August 25, 2003	March 26, 2005
A mysterious stranger wanders the woods of Baihuzu Hills, the headquarters of the Baihuzu team, and although this strange young man performs incredible good deeds, Lee and the rest of the team are suspicious, and tell their leader Rei, all about him. It isn't long until the entire team meets up with him again, and Rei comes face to face with the stranger's incredible abilities like leaping, flying and jumping through the air, aside from Beyblading like a world champion. He introduces himself as Mystel and is challenged to a battle. Lee is humiliated by a quick loss, and now it's Rei's turn. Mystel has his beyblade Poseidon dodge Driger's every move, but eventually he steps on a broken rock and falls from high up above. Rei manages to catch him, and the match ends in a tie. After the battle, Mystel informs Rei and Lee about the new BEGA group and even tells them that Takao is the newest member. As Mystel leaves, Rei decides to go with him to check on things out personally, since he is reluctant to accept the end of BBA.
137	35	"Pros and Ex-cons"; Transliteration: "Omae ni aete yokatta ze" (Japanese: おまえに会えてよかったぜ)	September 1, 2003	April 2, 2005
Takao can't seem to make up his mind whether or not to trust Boris and go pro. When the team is visited by a rabid pack of sponsors who want to sign them to product contracts, Grandpa is forced to step in and recommend that Takao have a talk with his more experienced brother, Hiro. Meanwhile, Boris discusses the possibility of having Takao in his team with Garland, the boy seen with Brooklyn in episode 33. While looking for Hiro, Takao and friends come across Yuri, Bryan and Sergei, who are on their way to get revenge on Boris by bringing the BEGA league down around him. Takao is torn between following Yuri, and respecting Yuri's wish that he stays out of it. At the BEGA headquarters, Yuri, Sergei, and Bryan confront Boris and demand to face his top beybladers. Boris accepts their challenge, but puts them up against some first-level recruits instead to make them feel overconfident. After an easy victory from the Neo Borg, Garland jumps from a balcony and challenges them to a battle. Boris promises to dismantle the league if they beat Garland but they have to join his pro league if Garland beats them. Yuri refuses the deal and thinks to himself that Boris would never put so much at stake if he wasn't sure of Garland's capabilities. However, Garland wants to battle anyway as a point of pride. Takao and the gang arrive just in time to see Garland defeat Bryan and Sergei in a two-on-one battle, melting parts of their beyblades and causing both bladers to faint.
138	36	"Boris, the Blade Stops Here!"; Transliteration: "Fuzakeru na!" (Japanese: ふざけるな!)	September 8, 2003	April 9, 2005
BEGA announces in the press the match between Yuri and Garland and the stadium is filled with spectators in a matter of minutes, much to everyone's surprise. Even Blader DJ is rushed to the stadium. Rei arrives with Mystel and both watch from afar. The battle starts and Garland just lets Yuri attack so that he runs out of energy. Mid-battle, Yuri asks Garland why such a talented beyblader like him decided to join BEGA. Garland then explains he is a member of the Siebald family, the youngest of six children who aim to be the number one in their sports. His siblings have already achieved success in baseball, football, golf, tennis and Formula 1, and he wants to be the number one beyblader. When it becomes clear that Yuri will never understand his reasons, Garland decides to finish the battle. Yuri eventually takes Garland down with his Novae Rog attack, but fails to effectively defeat him. As the battle rages on, the spectators start to get bored since Yuri has lost his energy and Boris is worried that he will fail to entertain the public. When Garland's Apollon knocks Wolborg out of the stadium, bars rise up out of the floor and keep Yuri's blade in the dish. Boris than announces that the battle will only end if one of the beyblades stop spinning. Meanwhile, Kai is seen in front of BEGA's building. As the battle continues, Garland aggressively beats Yuri, weakening him. Kai arrives at a balcony and Hiro appears later to talk to him about BEGA. When Takao and the others realize Yuri can get hurt, Takao demands Boris to end the fight. Boris says he has taken notes on Takao complaints and signalizes to Garland, giving him thumbs up for the end of the match. Garland then launches his special attack Radiant Thunder and knocks Yuri meters away, damaging the stadium. Yuri uses his last amounts of energy to reveal in Takao's arms that the Barthez Battalion was actually BEGA's exhibition team that went wrong following their decision to sack their coach. Enraged, Takao yells out at Boris telling him his whole BEGA outfit is bogus and he challenges the shadowy figure to a battle. Boris accepts the challenge and announces that if BEGA loses, he will dissolve it. Rei shows up and joins his former teammate. Kai also appears, but walks right past Takao to join BEGA, leaving the World Champion shocked and speechless.
139	37	"The BEGA Challenge"; Transliteration: "1000% da!" (Japanese: 1000%だ!)	September 15, 2003	April 16, 2005
Boris announces the challenge suggested by Takao will be a five-beyblader team fight. Takao's team include Max, Rei and Daichi, but they are clueless as to who can be their fifth element, since Kai joined BEGA. The sponsors that once knocked at Takao's door to offer him lucrative deals appear again to announce they are withdrawing their proposals since Takao is now up against BEGA. Kaichou also reveals that beybladers not enlisted on Bori's organization are unlikely to be able to buy new parts. Hiromi goes on search for a shop that still sells beyblade parts for non-members of BEGA, to no avail. A special news bulletin announces BEGA has called a press conference to announce their new special coach, who will prepare their bladers for the challenge. Everyone is surprised that the mysterious coach is Hiro, BBA Revolution's former coach. Takao is shocked that even his own brother has switched sides and goes to a park to vent off his anger. Rei, who followed him, advises him not to be so angry on Kai and Hiro and demands him to understand that he is the one everyone wants to defeat. Takao asks if he and Max are going to leave him too, and Rei says he's got no intention of doing it, but challenges Takao for a battle in order to "find something out". A furious battle ensues and Kyojyu is worried that if they damage their beyblades too much, they won't be able to repair them in time for the competition, since BEGA now controls everything. Takao and Rei launch their final attacks and Takao barely wins, leaving Dragoon and Driger severely damaged. Max then deduces Rei wanted to battle Takao because he was the only former Bladebreaker who didn't have the chance to battle Takao at his best (see episode 10), which Rei confirms. Kyojyu is horrified to find out that Dragoon and Driger are unusable and unable to be repaired since they ran out of parts. Daichi then suggests they make their own beyblades from zero, which the team accepts.
140	38	"BEGA on the Rise"; Transliteration: "Jigoku o Miru zo" (Japanese: 地獄を見るぞ)	September 22, 2003	April 23, 2005
Boris shows Hiro his beybladers, and Hiro chooses Brooklyn, which Boris introduces as "BEGA's most powerful weapon". Boris is satisfied with the progress of his top bladers, who are training heavily in a series of practice and exhibition matches. Ming Ming easily dispatches the amateur team that fought the Neo Borg. Mystel is shown easily defeating ten beybladers at once, only to disappear completely later, about which Boris does not get upset, since he knows "great bladers cannot be tamed". Moses visits his ill sister at the hospital and she gives him a small token built after him, leading him to tears. Back at BEGA's training facilities, Kai and Garland have a practice match. As their beyblades clash, the beybladers themselves engage on a physical fight, with Kai effectively blocking Garland's every move. The match ends in a tie, with both sides deducing their opponent did not give everything they've got. Later, Hiro coaches Brooklyn into performing better launches, and Brooklyin is able to destroy one rock by attempting a simple shot. Garland and Kai watch from the building and he explains to Kai that Brooklyn is from a totally different level and that he was never able to be more than a good warm up for him. Later, Kai deduces Hiro only joined BEGA to force Takao to get stronger and that he is now amazed with Brooklyn's talent. Hiro confirms that Brooklyn is unbelievably powerful and Kai is no match for him, which Garland later endorses in the corridor. Still, Kai wants to battle him and find more about such powerful blader. Meanwhile, Takao and his friends find themselves unable to practice because Boris has cornered the market on new parts.
141	39	"Rebel Alliance"; Transliteration: "BBA no Saishū heiki" (Japanese: BBAの最終兵器)	September 29, 2003	April 30, 2005
Takao and Daichi disguise themselves in an effort to get badly needed replacement parts for their damaged Beyblades. But without an official BEGA I.D. card signifying membership in the new league they're shut out from getting parts at any store. Despairing about how they'll solve this dilemma, they're visited by members of various teams they fought against in the World Championships: Baihuzu, PPB All Starz, Barthez Battalion, and F Sangre. They don't like Boris and his professional BEGA league either, seeing this new entity as a threat to the sport of Beyblading. They vow to help Takao and the other members of the BBA Revolution in whatever way they can to overthrow BEGA. Meanwhile, Emily and Michael deliver some hardware for Kyojyu to develop new beyblades. Later, he reveals to them the blueprints of "the most powerful beyblade ever created". Boarding a bus to the location there Takao and Daichi trained before the World Championship, the group discuss who's going to form the team to face off against BEGA. Julia, Mariah and Matilda comment that one of the members should be a girl, just like the BEGA has Ming Ming. After another day of training, Takao reflects on the team's capabilities as "underdogs". Kyojyu then shows up with Miguel and Emily - the trio succeeded in utilizing data from past battles and leftover parts to create the revolutionary Dragoon Metal Storm, a smaller type of beyblade. Takao promptly prepares to give it a try, but as he pulls the ripcord, his body is pushed far back, knocking Rei and Rick in the process. Dragoon MS destroys some rocks and lands hardly on the ground, creating a crater. Everyone is struck with awe by the power of such beyblade.
142	40	"Back to Basics"; Transliteration: "Gibu Appu ka?" (Japanese: ギブアップか?)	October 6, 2003	May 7, 2005
Kyojyu explains that the new Hard Metal beyblades are hard to control due to their smaller but heavier attack rings.Takao, Daichi, Rei and Max all give their beyblades a try, but are unable to control them and grow frustrated on their failures. Meanwhile, Boris hosts a press conference in which he explains Takao and his friends are "radicals who oppose Beyblade progress of any kind" and are willing to destroy everything he worked for. He then announces his Justice 5 tournament as a response to Takao's challenge. Back at the training camp, Dragoon and Gaia Dragoon eventually run away from Takao and Daichi and they set off in search for them, failing numerous times to collect them back. Eventually, Takao and Daichi recall making their first attempts of beyblading as kids and realize controlling the Hard Metal beyblades is all about going back to basics. Suddenly, they stumble upon a bear. By reflex, they manage to have their beyblades take down two trees to block the animal. Meanwhile, Rei and Max also realize they should train as if they were newbies with beyblading and finally manage to control their new Draciel and Driger blades against Rick and Lee. Takao and Daichi eventually reappear and knock Rick and Lee out of the dish.
143	41	"And Justice-Five For All"; Transliteration: "Nan no Tsumorida" (Japanese: なんのつもりだ)	October 13, 2003	May 14, 2005
Takao, Max and Rei struggle to fully master the Hard Metal system. They still need one more member for the team, and Rick, Lee and Michael have all volunteered to fill the remaining slot. But first they have to prove they can also control the new blades, which proves a lot tougher than they thought. Meanwhile, Hiro and Boris discuss who is going to form the BEGA team to take part of Justice 5. Hiro lists their five best beybladers: Garland, Mystel, Moses, Ming-Ming and Kai. Boris misses Brooklyn and Hiro explains he has avoided public appearances, so he is still unranked. Boris then demands Hiro to convince Brooklyn to join BEGA. Hiro suggests BEGA hold a tournament to give some unknown Beyblader's a chance to try to make the "Bega Bladers" team. Boris knows that they probably won't be able to beat his pros but he also wants to see the mysterious Brooklyn in action. He creates five groups of beybladers, each of them containing one of the five top-ranked beybladers. The non-top beybladers protest, feeling the championship is a fake and the winners were already decided. Boris explains that if they want to become professionals, they must defeat BEGA's best names. The tournament plays out as expected with the original BEGA pros all securing a spot on the team with ease. Brooklyn is finally seen in action, but he simply dodges his opponent's every attack, until he eventually stops spinning. The final match of Group E will see Kai facing off against Brooklyn for the final spot on the team. Kai launches a fire attack on Brooklyn, with absolutely no effect. Brooklyn then copies Kai's move and effectively hits Dranzer with it, much to everyone's surprise.
144	42	"When You Wish Upon A Star"; Transliteration: "Misutā X da!" (Japanese: ミスターXだ!)	October 20, 2003	May 21, 2005
Kai's attack causes no effect on Brooklyn's blade, and Brooklyn then copies it, effectively hitting Dranzer, much to everyone's surprise. Kai tries his best to take command but it seems Brooklyn mirrors his every move. Brooklyn starts slamming Kai's blade, with every hit hurting Kai's own body. Hiro explains to Kai that Brooklyn is from a whole different league and that Kai will never reach his level. Kai wants to prove him wrong and launches a full force attack on Brooklyn, setting his Dranzer on fire. However, Brooklyn simply cancels his attack and releases his special attack King of Darkness, knocking him unconscious meter away and shattering Dranzer to pieces. Takao and his friends, who watched the match on the TV, are horrified with Kai's defeat. Now that the BEGA Blader's team has been picked, it's up to Takao and his crew to set a team. After much discussion about it, they all agree it should be up to Takao to choose, but Takao doesn't say anything. Takao goes out for some fresh air and Kyojyu goes after him. He deduced Takao would want Kai to rejoin the team and unveils a Hard Metal Dranzer he developed. Just before Justice 5 begins, Takao and his friends pay a still unconscious Yuri a visit at the hospital. There, they meet Kaichou, who suggests they should be named "G Revolutions". Before leaving, Takao leaves the new Dranzer on Yuri's bed. As the tournament begins, they present only four bladers, however, they finally reveal their fifth: 'Mr. X', which is actually just Grandpa in a mask. Now the first battle is about to begin and it pits Daichi against Ming Ming.
145	43	"Sing Ming Ming Sing!"; Transliteration: "Ā Yū Redi?" (Japanese: アーユーレディ?)	November 3, 2003	May 28, 2005
Daichi's goal is to prove that Ming Ming doesn't take Beyblading seriously and he vows to knock her out of the stadium early in the match. She metamorphoses into her grown up, blader persona, gains the upper hand and this makes Daichi very annoyed. Eventually, she metamorphoses back into her singing persona and brings her band next to the dish to perform her hit song. Singing seems to make her blading improve and she slams Gaia Dragoon relentlessly. Kyojyu realizes that it's her voice that helps her concentrate on her blade and Takao tells Daichi of her secret. Daichi uses his own voice to unleash the full power of Gaia Dragoon, engulfing him and Ming-Ming in a dark, prehistoric scenario with an erupting volcano, but Ming Ming counter attacks with her V-Temptation special attack, which replaces Daichi's world with colorful flowery fields filled with cute animals, weakening Gaia Dragoon and allowing Venus to knock it out of the dish. Daichi is frustrated, but congratulates Ming Ming. Takao and the others realize that the Bega Bladers intend to fight fairly and they all vow to do their very best to win the next battle. Before the match is started, a beaten Kai is seen laying down in an alley.
146	44	"Refuse to Lose"; Transliteration: "Zettai ni katsu!!" (Japanese: 絶対に勝つ!!)	November 10, 2003	June 4, 2005
It's the second match of the Justice Five Battle and Rei and Moses are facing off against each other just as Monica, Moses's sister, undergoes surgery. From the beginning, the battle is fierce with both Blader's inflicting significant damage. Rei quickly gains the upper hand and it looks like its game over when he starts taking Moses's Gigars's pieces out. Meanwhile, at the hospital, Monica starts showing signals of weakening as Moses gets slammed by Rei. It is only once Moses calls upon her spirit that he is filled with the courage and strength necessary to match Rei, at the same time Monica starts to recover and fight back her disease. After partially destroying the miniature-sized city stadium, and having strong motivations, both beybladers unleash their final, special attacks. After the final clash, Driger and Gigars are still spinning and pushing each other mid-air above the totally trashed stadium. They eventually knock each other away as the bladers succumb to exhaustion. A vision of Monica appears over Gigars, and a piece of the stadium falls, hitting Moses' beyblade and forcing it back into the dish, where it explodes in pieces. Driger, on the other hand, is still spinning and in one peace - however, it landed out of the dish, making Moses the winner and putting BEGA two points ahead. Rei is sad, but recognizes Moses' spirit. Moses thanks Rei and promises they will have another fight one day.
147	45	"Max to the Max"; Transliteration: "OK!" (Japanese: OK!)	November 17, 2003	June 11, 2005
Now that BEGA is two wins ahead of G Revolutions, it all comes down to Max's fight against Mystel. Max stumbles upon Boris on his way out of the toilet and Boris asks him to win the match or otherwise the tournament will become "boring" and people will think he cheated to win. Takao and the others argue whether Max's signature defensive style will be enough to overcome Mystel's unpredictable and overpowering attack. Max takes this as a sign that his teammates only think he can win if he changes the way he Beyblades altogether. His confidence shattered, Max isolates himself and does some soul-searching. He receives a morale boost from Rick, who helps Max realize that his trademark style is what made him so successful as a Blader, and it would be foolish not to use it just because the odds are against him. As the match is about to begin, Takao and the others apologize to Max. As the battle begins, Max adopts attacking patterns, surprising everyone. However, he quickly readopts his defensive style, allowing Poseidon to brutally slam Draciel. It seems Draciel is taking a lot of damage, but Kyojyu realizes Max is actually adjusting Draciel's pitch so that it takes as little damage as possible from Poseidon's attacks. Eventually, they release their special attacks, with Max's only managing to weaken Poseidon. He manages to hold his ground against Mystel and the match ends in a draw. The stalemate result isn't the victory that Max desired, but it successfully postpones any chance of losing the tournament for at least one more match.
148	46	"The Return of Kai"; Transliteration: "Torebia-pin!" (Japanese: トレビア〜ン!)	November 24, 2003	June 18, 2005
Kai pays Yuri a visit at the hospital and collects the new Dranzer. Takao and the rest of the team are practicing furiously to guarantee a check in the win column for tomorrow's big match. Takao thinks no one on the team has the same skill with the Hard Metal Beyblade and he refuses to choose any of his teammates to Blade in the penultimate round of the tournament, insisting instead to blade both final rounds himself. Meanwhile, Kai tries to practice with his new Dranzer, but is unable to control it. F Sangre's coach Romero, who was fishing nearby, finds Kai and knocks Dranzer out with his beyblade. He then offers himself to help Kai gain control of Dranzer and challenges him for a match. Kai eventually uses his will to defeat Brooklyn and Takao to regain control of Dranzer and win the battle. He then meets Takao and the others by the river where they were practicing.
149	47	"Now You're Making Me Mad"; Transliteration: "Huh?" (Japanese: えっ!?)	December 1, 2003	June 25, 2005
The second day of Justice 5 begins and Garland is expected to fight the fourth round. Takao and his friends approach the dish, and Takao reveals Kai as their fifth member, surprising everyone. Kai specifically picks Brooklyn and they start a massive battle with Kai trying desperately to somehow attack his opponent, but nothing seems to work and Brooklyn hits Kai easily. Eventually, Kai realizes he must find the power within himself, and Romero deduces the Hard Metal system works by empowering a beyblade with its owner's own emotions. Kai manages to knock Brooklyn's Zeus away for the first time. However, Brooklyn still has much power and generates a kind of black hole with his beyblade, dragging anything that's nearby, including Dranzer and Kai himself. Just as he approaches Zeus, Kai musters up some more energy and has Dranzer strike Zeus, knocking it away once again and almost out of the dish. Kai starts succumbing to exhaustion and Rei and Max realize Kai is pushing it too hard. Both try to interfere, but Daichi, Hiromi and Kyojyu hold them. Kai then wows to defeat his opponent and promises to do "whatever it takes".
150	48	"The Beyblading Spirit"; Transliteration: "Ai da…!" (Japanese: 愛だ…!)	December 8, 2003	July 2, 2005
Kai managed to break out of Brooklyn's black hole, but he still gets heavily beaten by Brooklyn. Kyojyu's lap top detects multiple damages on Dranzer and he ultimately closes the computer, admitting Kai won't stand any more chances. Rei and Max then head for the dish one more time and try to stop the fight to save Kai, but Takao blocks their way and, in tears, begs them not to intervene. Brooklyn uses his special attack King of Darkness on Kai. In the middle of the attack's cutscene, Takao's hand reaches for Kai, and he manages to escape it. Nevertheless, he passes out. Blader DJ declares Brooklyn the winner, but Dranzer is still spinning and Kai gets back up again. Brooklyn is impressed, but still confident of victory and continues to brutally hit Kai. However, every time he hits Kai, the G Revolutions member gets back up again. Brooklyn notices he is sweating for the first time in his life and decides to attack with everything he's got. But Kai still resists. Eventually, Brooklyn goes insane due to Kai's insistence and starts releasing dark beams of energy in all directions. Kai still manages to hold on, and explains that he will always learn something from his battles and that Brooklyn lacks the "beyblading spirit". Kai then unleashes his final attack and knocks a damaged Zeus out of the dish, winning the match. Brooklyn's teammates are surprised and Brooklyn stares stunned and confused at his beyblade after suffering his very first beyblade defeat. Kai assures his concerned teammates that he is alright despite the beating he took and tells Takao that he should be more concerned with his upcoming battle against Garland. Takao shrugs Kai's advice off but secretly hopes he can summon the same amazing strength that his old friend showed in his battle. Kai walks away into the corridor, kneels down by a wall, reflects on his battle and his teammates and drops his Dranzer, which explodes in peaces. Yuri sheds some tears while still unconscious.
151	49	"The Principles of Victory"; Transliteration: "Achō!" (Japanese: アチョーーー!)	December 15, 2003	July 9, 2005
Garland is seen in his preparing room, staring at a locked book. He unlocks it and wows to defeat Takao for the sake of his family honor. Meanwhile, Takao reflects at the corridor while the rest of the team discuss his chances, considering Garland is probably as powerful as Brooklyn. Hiro speaks with Garland and the blader explains he is battling for the name of his family, not for BEGA. He also reveals that the book he just unlocked contains the Seabald's family code. He then recalls his siblings sports achievements and wows to join them as the number one in their respective sports. Meanwhile, Takao has a training match against Daichi, Rei, Max and Kyojyu and tells them he is confident of his victory. As the final Justice 5 battle starts, Garland is confident and has a fierce fight with Takao. Throughout the battle, Garland recites the principles of his family, which makes him stronger. Eventually, Takao explains he beyblades for the fun of the sport, while Garland explains he plays only for victory. Takao says he wants to fight the real Garland, not a book of rules. Garland accepts the challenge and they get back to the battle, with Garland now fighting without his family's principles. Eventually, the crowd starts cheering for both of them and Boris observes, seemingly confused. They head for their special attacks and Takao wins. They both shake hands and congratulate each other for having a "great fight" and Boris angrily breaks a champagne cup.
152	50	"Welcome to my Nightmare!"; Transliteration: "Kono Makeinu ga!" (Japanese: この負け犬が!)	December 22, 2003	August 19, 2005
Since Justice 5 ended with each side having two wins and a tie, a sixth, tie-breaking match will be held so that they can settle the challenge. Takao (the one who's going to battle in the final match) and his friends pay Yuri a visit at the hospital, where he still lays unconscious. Meanwhile, Brooklyn is still depressed over his first defeat ever and Boris is disappointed with Hiro's performance as a coach. Garland offers himself for the final battle, but Hiro turns him down cold and heads for the training room were Brooklyn's on the brink of a breakdown. It's up to Hiro to get him back into fighting form. Meanwhile, Boris has taken matters into his own hands and dispatches Moses and Ming Ming to knock Takao out before he even has a chance to battle the BEGA Blader's. Both bladers consider this cheating, but Boris angrily reminds them it was him who paid for Monica's health care and who made Ming Ming a popstar, and now it's time they return the favor. They reluctantly leave, while Mystel watches from afar. Back to Brooklyn's training room, he starts getting back to beyblading and wows to make the G Revolutions pay for his defeat. Garland leaves the room, feeling sick with so much power and Mystel waves to him through a window. Moses and Ming Ming attack Takao's house and Rick and Lee step in to protect him. Eventually, Moses starts losing it as his mind is still confused about helping Boris through cheating. When Takao opens his defense completely, deliberately leaving himself open for a smash hit, Moses has Gigars stop as Garland and Mystel arrive and he and the rest of BEGA bladers realize they are all on the same side. Before leaving, Garland warns Takao that Hiro is coaching Brooklyn and he will be stronger than ever. Brooklyn trains some launches and makes several holes at the wall of his training room, until he ultimately break through the wall.
153	51	"Brooklyn's Back!"; Transliteration: "Uza Inda Yotsu!" (Japanese: ウザいんだよっ!)	December 29, 2003 (Note: This episode was originally aired in Japan as a special double episode. In the English dub and the versions based on it, the episode was split in two.)	July 23, 2005
The final match between the G Revolutions and the BEGA Bladers has arrived. Boris meets Hiro in a corridor and orders him not to fail. As the battle starts, Brooklyn shows off his incredible powers immediately, stunning both teams on either side of the Beystadium. He even physically attacks Takao, making he fall down to the dish. Takao manages to recover, but Brooklyn still hasn't shown all his power. Blader DJ comments on the battle and Brooklyn has some rocks fall near him, telling him to "shut up". Brooklyn's immense powers allow him to create a wormhole to another dimension, creating an empty shell, carbon copy of the real world with only Takao, his teammates, and the rest of BEGA bladers. Not even Hiro was expecting so much power, whereas Boris is amazed and confident that BEGA will finally rule the beyblading world. The freak out continues as Brooklyn develops dark wings and a diabolic voice and destroys everything in his new empty world to mold it into an image that makes him satisfied. Takao's friends want to have the battle terminated, but Takao says he will continue in the name of true beyblading. Eventually, a beaten up but recovered Kai appears on top of a rock and tells Takao to keep his beyblading spirit. Takao then decides to test Brooklyn's dimension and finds out he's even able to fly.
154	52	"Beybattle for the Ages"; Transliteration: "GO! Shūto!!" (Japanese: GO!シュート!!)	December 29, 2003	July 30, 2005
Brooklyn's power has generated a giant vortex in the sky that causes buildings to crumble in the city and begins enveloping the whole world with growing darkness. As Kaichou watches the game via TV at the hospital, Yuri begins showing signs of awakening. Takao and Brooklyn carry out a massive battle midair. Even the military try to interfere, but Brooklyn has Zeus send their aircraft towards the havoc. Takao flies towards the havoc and hacks into Brooklyn's mind, where two different sides of Brooklyn are opposed. Takao realizes Brooklyn has always been alone because he has always won, so the other kids never wanted to fight him. When reasoning fails, the pair continue their battle above the ever-crumbling city. Hiro realizes Brooklyn's power is getting way out of hand and tells everyone else to leave. However, Takao's friends will stay for him. After seeing this, Garland realizes the BEGA bladers have never been friends, and, in tears, realizes he has never actually supported Brooklyn. As they release their final attacks, Max has Draciel join Dragoon's tornado. Yuri then finally awakens and has Wolborg unleash its special attack on Zeus. Brooklyn then realizes Takao is not alone. Rei and Kai join in and the powers of all bitbeasts combined make Takao's beyblde evolve, creating the ultimate beyblade. Their final clash manage to take down Brooklyn's dimension, unveiling a destroyed city and transforming Brooklyn back into his human, gentle form. Most people are confused, but when they see Dragon and Zeus are still spinning, they run to see the match. Takao's and Brooklyn's friends start cheering for their respective teammates, and even Blader DJ succumbs to the heat of the moment and let go of his microphone, cheering just like another spectator. Boris emerges from a pile of rocks and laments the destruction of his BEGA skyscraper. When he sees dozens of fans running towards him, he thinks they are willing to greet him, but they simply stampede him and keep walking towards their real goal - the battle. Boris laments they do not recognize the efforts he had put on BEGA, but Hiro appears and explains he has only coached BEGA bladers for Takao and his friends to have a higher skill level to achieve. Boris kneels down as he realizes it's over for him. Hiro reflects on how his little brother has evolved as a blader and leaves with tears of pride. Kaichou and a recovered Yuri approach the match, and Yuri and Kai exchange smiles. Takao and Brooklyn head for a final clash, and both beyblades take off towards the sky, with the outcome of the match never revealed. Months later, the city is still recovering and Kaichou's BBA league restarts, but in a much more modest form, with its headquarters being a small house under a bridge. Takao and Kai rest on a hill and Takao wants to pay his promise to Kai and have a rematch. As the crowd gather around them, they prepare their beyblades and the episode ends with an image of Dranzer and Dragoon staring at each other. The anime ends with images of almost every team and major character that appeared in the series. Bahuzu are seen in a forest with their coach; Mystel plucks some fruits from a tree; Ming-Ming performs live to a crowd that includes an excited Kyojyu; Moses rejoins his recovered sister; Brooklyn rests with some animals while Garland watches from the window of a mansion; Neo Borg walk by a crowd of cheering fans in Russia, reunited with their old member Ian who was absent in this season; Hiro coaches some kids in beyblading; the Saint Shields contemplate the view in a field; Kane, Salima, Jim and Goki walk out of an airplane; F Sangre have a two-on-two battle against King and Queen in a stadium, and so do Matilda and Aaron against Robert and Oliver; Rick battles Hiruta in an alley; Johnny, Enrique, Miguel and Claude have an unexplained problem with the Dark Bladers in a corridor; the PPB All Starz and Judy greet old member Steve in an hospital where he is being treated for a broken foot (he was also absent from the season); a short-haired Zeo is seen with a violin in his hands looking through a window, with his Cerberus beyblade near him; Romero, Takao's grandfather, Hiromi, teacher Kinkaid, Max's father and Kyojyu's parents are seen in the latters' restaurant; the manga exclusive characters Hikaru Tomoji, Kennosuke Shishi and Tenmaru Shishi make a cameo appearance; and the season ends with an image of Takao, Kai, Rei, Max, Daichi and Kyojyu.
