= Beyblade: Metal Fusion season 1 =

Beyblade: Metal Fusion
- Season 1
- The cover of the first DVD compilation released by Sony Pictures Entertainment
- No. of episodes: 51

Release
- Original network: TV Tokyo
- Original release: April 5, 2009 – March 28, 2010

Season chronology
- Next → Metal Masters

Beyblade: Metal Fusion, known in Japan as Metal Fight Beyblade, is the first season of the 2009 Japanese anime television series Beyblade: Metal Saga based on Takafumi Adachi's manga series Beyblade: Metal Fusion, which itself is based on the Beyblade spinning top game from Takara Tomy and Hasbro. The 51-episode series was produced by d-rights and Nelvana under the direction of Kunihisa Sugishima.

The season was first broadcast on TV Tokyo in Japan between April 5, 2009, and March 28, 2010. Nelvana announced that it will air in Canada's on May 15, 2010, on YTV. The season premiered on June 26, 2010 in the United States on Cartoon Network, on September 13, 2010, in the United Kingdom, on November 10, 2010, in Australia on Network Ten, and in Latin America on April 18, 2011, on Disney XD.

Two pieces of theme music were used for the opening and closing themes. The opening theme is "Metal Fight Beyblade" (メタルファイト ベイブレード) performed by Yu+Ki and the ending theme is "Boys ~Hikari Kagayaku Ashita e~" (Boys～光り輝く明日へ～) performed by MASH. The first 23 episodes were released on six DVD compilations of three to four episodes each by Sony Pictures Entertainment. The first compilation was released on July 15, 2009 while the sixth compilation was released on December 9, 2009. The remaining 28 episodes were released on seven DVD compilations under the title Metal Fight Beyblade: Battle Bladers (メタルファイト ベイブレード バトルブレーダーズ編, Metarufaito Beiburēdo - Batoruburēdāzu-hen). The first compilation was released on January 13, 2010 while the seventh compilation was released on July 14, 2010. Beyblade: Metal Fusion was followed by a second season titled Beyblade: Metal Masters.

== Episode list ==
No.	Title	Directed by	Written by	Original release date	English air date
1	"Pegasis Has Landed!"; Transliteration: "Maiorita pegashisu!" (Japanese: 舞い降りた天馬(ペガシス)！)	Yoshinori Odaka	Katsumi Hasegawa	April 5, 2009	May 15, 2010 (Canada); June 26, 2010 (USA)
Kenta, a young boy who after winning a Beyblade, Sagittario, runs into a band of bullies called the 'Face Hunters' who bully him to play an unfair match. Kenta unexpectedly is saved by Ginga Hagane, the main protagonist of the series with his Beyblade Pegasis and wipes out the beys of The Face Hunters easily. Benkei, who is second in command of the gang challenges Ginga that he is going to regret this and runs away. Later, Ginga and Kenta become friends and Ginga tells Kenta that he is exploring the country to find challenging opponents and improve his bey powers. Next morning, Benkei invites Ginga to the Face Hunters and accepts it readily and is challenged by 100 bladers but he defeats them with equal ease. Soon, Kyoya steps up revealing that he is the Face Hunters leader and would like to have Ginga as an opponent and challenges him to battle.
2	"Leone's Fangs!"; Transliteration: "Reōne no kiba!" (Japanese: 獅子(レオーネ)の牙！)	Hiroya Saitō	Katsumi Hasegawa	April 12, 2009	May 15, 2010 (Canada); June 27, 2010 (USA)
Kyoya, leader of the Face Hunters, has challenged Ginga. Ginga and Kenta discuss this challenge. Kenta even introduces Ginga to his friends and tells them about his feat to defeat the Face Hunters. Outside, Madoka, a young girl announces that Ginga's Bey Pegasis is in need of repair. She explains that dust, scratches and other things damage a Bey and it cannot be used to its fullest and proposes to repair the Beyblade of Ginga for free. Ginga worries about the match between him and Kyoya and if he should give his Beyblade Pegasis to Madoka for repair. But eventually he does and Madoka repairs it, but on the day of battle with Kyoya, Madoka says that the balance of the Bey isn't repaired, but Ginga takes the Bey and battles Kyoya, crushing his windstorm and defeating him with his special move. Later, a silhouetted figure appears and claims he can defeat Ginga.
3	"The Wolf's Ambition!"; Transliteration: "Vorufu no yabō!" (Japanese: 狼(ヴォルフ)の野望！)	Toshihito Naka	Katsumi Hasegawa	April 19, 2009	May 15, 2010 (Canada); July 3, 2010 (USA)
Daidoji takes Kyoya away from the city to make a deal. If Kyoya loses a battle against him, then he must go with him. Meanwhile, Kenta is worried Ginga is getting bored with having no strong opponents to battle and challenges him to prove his worth.
4	"Charge! Bull Power!"; Transliteration: "Tosshin! Buru pawā!" (Japanese: 突進！牡牛(ブル)パワー！)	Yōsuke Hashiguchi	Masaharu Amiya	April 26, 2009	May 15, 2010 (Canada); July 4, 2010 (USA)
Daidoji gives Benkei a new bey, Dark Bull, with which he can defeat Ginga. Excited, Benkei sends Kenta off with a challenge for Ginga. Upon arriving, Ginga and co realized strange holes have been made at the battle location, and then a bey appears. Ginga and co follow the bey to Benkei, where a heated battle ensues. As the battle continues the warehouse begins to fall apart, and soon the ceiling above Ginga collapses, but Benkei selflessly saves Ginga, as well as providing comic relief due to his lack of reasons on why he did that.
5	"Vengeful Cancer"; Transliteration: "Fukushū no Kyansā" (Japanese: 復讐のキャンサー)	Naruyo Takahashi	Kazuyuki Fudeyasu	May 3, 2009	May 22, 2010 (Canada); July 10, 2010 (USA)
There's a new blader in town, Tetsuya, who is destroying the Beys of the bladers he defeats. Angered by this, Madoka sets off to find him with Ginga and Kenta in pursuit. After splitting up, Kenta realizes one of his friends is a new victim of Tetsuya. He battles him, thankfully saved by the arrival of Ginga. But Tetsuya has kidnapped Madoka, and unless Ginga defeats him, she'll remain missing.
6	"Aquario's Challenge"; Transliteration: "Akuario no chōsen" (Japanese: アクアリオの挑戦)	Shinya Watada	Mitsuhiro Yamada	May 10, 2009	May 29, 2010 (Canada); July 11, 2010 (USA)
Hikaru Hasama, a strong blader from afar, arrives in town and is asked by Benkei to defeat Ginga. Meanwhile, Kenta wonders whether Sagittario could have a special move, as Madoka explains it's possible. Hikaru accepts Benkei's offer, but Ginga is sick and so Kenta battles in his place, unbeknownst to Hikaru.
7	"It's Our Special Move! Sagittario"; Transliteration: "Hissatsu tengi da! Sajitario" (Japanese: 必殺転技だ！サジタリオ)	Yoshinori Odaka	Katsumi Hasegawa	May 17, 2009	June 5, 2010 (Canada); July 17, 2010 (USA)
Kenta is trained by Benkei to defeat Hikaru whilst Madoka gives Kenta a new bey part to help him with his special move. Meanwhile, Hikaru has been told by Tetsuya who her real opponent was and is on the prowl for the real Ginga Hagane, though is interrupted by Kenta.
8	"Merci's Dangerous Trap"; Transliteration: "Merushī no kiken na wana" (Japanese: メルシーの危険な罠)	Hiroya Saitō	Jukki Hanada	May 24, 2009	June 12, 2010 (Canada); July 18, 2010 (USA)
Kyoya is sent to Wolf Canyon by Daidoji to test his skills. Meanwhile, Merci kidnaps Ginga and convinces him he's on a TV show while it's really testing his skills.
9	"Leone's Counterattack"; Transliteration: "Reōne no gyakushū" (Japanese: 獅子王(レオーネ)の逆襲)	Toshihito Naka	Masaharu Amiya	May 31, 2009	June 19, 2010 (Canada); July 24, 2010 (USA)
Kyoya has returned from Wolf Canyon and Benkei is excited to see his old friend again, with encouragement from Kenta. But Kyoya has changed, revealed in a battle, and even with Kenta at his side Benkei loses as Leone destroys the warehouse they're in.
10	"Heated Battle! Ginga VS Kyoya"; Transliteration: "Gekitō! Ginga VS Kyōya" (Japanese: 激闘！銀河VSキョウヤ)	Yōsuke Hashiguchi	Kazuyuki Fudeyasu	June 7, 2009	June 26, 2010 (Canada); July 25, 2010 (USA)
Kenta returns with an injured Benkei and tells Ginga what Kyoya did to them. Furious, Ginga challenges Kyoya who is now out of control, bent on destroying Ginga and Pegasis. During the battle, a tornado rips through the city, involuntarily summoning his friends to cheer him on. The battle is a fierce one, but Ginga wins, bringing Kyoya back to his senses. Suddenly, they all spot a conspicuous-looking helicopter bearing the seal of Ginga's sworn enemy, the Dark Nebula, led by Daidoji.
11	"Chase the Wolf!"; Transliteration: "Vorufu o oe!" (Japanese: 狼(ヴォルフ)を追え！)	Hiroya Saitō	Katsumi Hasegawa	June 14, 2009	July 31, 2010
Ginga returns and explains to his friends that Daidoji has a forbidden Bey: Lightning L-Drago. Tipped off by Kyoya, they arrive at the Dark Nebula castle and are ambushed by many Beys. With help once again from Kyoya, they break down the doors and head inside, for what will be a long battle to the top.
12	"Infiltrate the Dark Nebula's Castle!"; Transliteration: "Sennyū! Dāku nebyura no shiro" (Japanese: 潜入！ダークネビュラの城)	Masahito Otani	Mitsuhiro Yamada; Katsumi Hasegawa	June 21, 2009	August 1, 2010
After many challenges, Ginga is the only one to reach Daidoji. They battle which causes one of the walls to collapse. But their challenge isn't over yet...
13	"L-Drago Awakens!"; Transliteration: "Erudorago, kakusei!" (Japanese: 竜皇(エルドラゴ)、覚醒！)	Yoshinori Odaka	Katsumi Hasegawa	June 28, 2009	August 7, 2010
Ryuga, an old rival of Ginga's and the new owner of L-Drago. As he and Ginga battle, Ginga is determined to win L-Drago back, but his anger, purposely provoked by Ryuga, stops him from winning, and as a result, loses devastatingly.
14	"Memories of Ryūsei"; Transliteration: "Ryūsei no kioku" (Japanese: 流星の記憶)	Toshihito Naka	Jukki Hanada	July 5, 2009	August 8, 2010
After losing to Ryuga, Ginga was in a state where he might even lose his passion for Beyblade. Kenta, unable to bear the sight of Ginga's state of mind, expressed his desire to help Ginga as a friend. Ginga was so moved by Kenta's words that he began to tell Kenta about his own past. It was a memory of a happy time in his home village. There he met his father, Ryūsei, the lord of Pegasis, whom Ginga respected the most. However, the peaceful days were shattered by Ryuga and Daidōji. They appeared to take L-Drago, which was sealed in the mountain.
15	"Mysterious Hyoma"; Transliteration: "Nazo no Hyouma" (Japanese: 謎の氷魔)	Yōsuke Hashiguchi	Masaharu Amiya	July 12, 2009	August 14, 2010
Ginga has run away, possibly to his home town. Kenta, Madoka, Kyoya and Benkei follow him but after many calamities part ways. Then a strange man appears and saves Kenta and Madoka.
16	"The Magnificent Aries"; Transliteration: "Karei naru Ariesu" (Japanese: 華麗なるアリエス)	Shunsuke Machitani	Kazuyuki Fudeyasu	July 19, 2009	August 15, 2010
The man's name is Hyoma, whom Kyoya has his doubts about. Hyoma says he'll guide them to Koma Village, but Kyoya proves he's walking him in circles. Then Hyoma reveals a secret, and the fact he's an old friend of Ginga's. Meanwhile Ginga, en route to Koma Village, meets an old friend.
17	"The Silver Pegasis"; Transliteration: "Shirogane no pegashisu" (Japanese: 白銀の天馬(ペガシス)！)	Eisuke Hayashi	Jirō Takayama	July 26, 2009	August 21, 2010
The gang arrive in Koma Village and are greeted by a talking dog called Hokuto. Hokuto tells them Ginga is climbing Mt. Hagane, seeking a scroll written by an old bearer of Pegasis. But then Ginga learns who the old bearer was and learns a valuable lesson.
18	"The Green Hell"; Transliteration: "Midori no jigoku" (Japanese: 緑の地獄)	Yasuyuki Fuse	Masashi Suzuki	August 2, 2009	August 22, 2010
Ginga takes friends to the bey forest where they are immediately excited. Meanwhile Hyoma, who is already jealous of Ginga's friends, challenges Ginga at a stadium called the Green Hell and reveals that as Ginga's true rival has never lost to Ginga in all their childhood.
19	"Conquer the Tag-Team Battle!"; Transliteration: "Taggu batoru o kōryaku seyo!" (Japanese: タッグバトルを攻略せよ！)	Yoshinori Odaka; Hiroya Saitō	Masaharu Amiya	August 9, 2009	August 28, 2010
Returning from Koma Village, Benkei and Kenta are furious with Madoka when she experiments with their Beys without telling them. But then they learn how to switch parts, and that comes in handy at the Aquatic Tag-Team Tournament they've just entered.
20	"Begin the Survival Battle!"; Transliteration: "Kaimaku! Sabaibaru batoru" (Japanese: 開幕！サバイバルバトル)	Norio Kashima	Kazuyuki Fudeyasu	August 16, 2009	August 29, 2010
The survival battle has begun, the winner being granted one wish. Everyone is entering, even Hyoma, Hikaru and Madoka. But despite everyone's enthusiasm there is a mysterious blader who has been defeating all his opponents.
21	"Warriors on a Solitary Island"; Transliteration: "Kotō no senshi-tachi" (Japanese: 孤島の戦士たち)	Toshihito Naka	Jirō Takayama	August 23, 2009	September 4, 2010
Kenta and Benkei are aided by a new battler, Yu Tendo and his bey Flame Libra. Kyoya, after not finishing his battle with Hikaru, challenges Hyoma, who has been watching everyone but not battling. Kyoya wins, but at a price. Meanwhile, Yu is upset the tournament is drawing to an end and is challenged by Kenta, Benkei and Hikaru all at once. But as the battle goes on, Yu reveals himself to be the one who has knocked many of the 1,000 competitors out of the competition with ease and refuses to be taken down.
22	"The Fearsome Libra"; Transliteration: "Senritsu no Ribura" (Japanese: 戦慄のリブラ)	Yōsuke Hashiguchi	Masashi Suzuki; Katsumi Hasegawa	August 30, 2009	September 5, 2010
Ginga, Kyoya, Yu and Madoka are the final four left in the survival battle. Kyoya, after being aided by Madoka, drops out leaving Ginga and Yu left to battle. They both launch their special moves, but in the end, Yu is victorious.
23	"The Road to the Battle Bladers"; Transliteration: "Batoru Burēdāzu e no michi" (Japanese: バトルブレーダーズへの道)	Shunsuke Machitani	Katsumi Hasegawa	September 6, 2009	September 11, 2010
As winner of the survival battle, Yu is granted his wish to hold a tournament to decide the strongest blader in the country. Then he reveals he's a member of the Dark Nebula, before leaving with Daidoji and Ryuga who showed up to taunt Ginga. After all agreeing to try to earn the 50,000 points needed to qualify for Battle Bladers, Ginga and his friends meet up at a stadium outside town to battle one last time.
24	"The Beautiful Aquila"; Transliteration: "Utsukushiki Akuira" (Japanese: 美しき鷲(アクイラ))	Hiroshi Kimura	Kazuyuki Fudeyasu	September 13, 2009	September 12, 2010
As Ginga travels the country with Pegasis, he is challenged by many point hunters. He is saved by a mysterious blader, Tsubasa Otori, and his Bey Earth Aquila. As they are entering the same tournament, the two bladers hang out together, Tsubasa giving Ginga some beyblade tips along the way. But as the tournament progresses, Ginga learns Tsubasa is hiding more secrets than he expected.
25	"The Sniper Capricorne"; Transliteration: "Sunaipā kapurikōne" (Japanese: 狙撃手(スナイパー)カプリコーネ)	Yasuyuki Fuse	Masaharu Amiya	September 20, 2009	September 18, 2010
Kyoya is tired of the weak battles he is forced to battle in, until he learns of a strong blader nearby: Tobio, nicknamed Captain Capri, and his bey Storm Capricorne.
26	"Tsubasa Flies Into The Dark"; Transliteration: "Yami ni mau Tsubasa" (Japanese: 闇に舞う翼)	Yoshinori Odaka; Hiroya Saitō	Jirō Takayama	September 27, 2009	September 19, 2010
The Dark Nebula get a shock as Tsubasa, whom they have been watching, appears at their headquarters demanding to join. Daidoji agrees, but only if Tsubasa can pass a series of tests.
27	"Intruders in the Challenge Match"; Transliteration: "Rannyū! Charenji matchi" (Japanese: 乱入！チャレンジマッチ)	Masahito Otani	Masashi Suzuki	October 4, 2009	September 25, 2010
Kenta and Hyoma meet up at a duel tournament, Kenta battling in the forest stadium and Hyoma in the river stadium. But Hyoma is interrupted when Yu intrudes, demanding to battle. Then Kenta, who has already won his tournament, is challenged by Tsubasa. However, both Kenta and Hyoma are defeated by their opponents.
28	"Dark Cancer's Big, Crabby-Crabby Operation!"; Transliteration: "Dāku Kyansā no kanikani daisakusen!" (Japanese: ダークキャンサーのカニカニ大作戦！)	Toshihito Naka	Kazuyuki Fudeyasu	October 11, 2009	September 26, 2010
The fiendish Tetsuya follows Yu back to the Dark Nebula Headquarters. Daidoji though makes use of this and upgrades Tetsuya's bey as an experiment to Dark Cancer. At a tournament, Tetsuya defeats Benkei by cheating but loses to Ginga.
29	"Kenta and Sora"; Transliteration: "Kenta to Sora" (Japanese: ケンタと宇宙)	Yōsuke Hashiguchi	Katsumi Hasegawa	October 18, 2009	October 2, 2010
Kenta, whilst competing in a tournament, meets Sora, an impatient battler with amazing skills. Sora claims to be Ginga's apprentice with his bey Cyber Pegasis and attempts to copy Pegasis' special move but cannot pull it off. At another tournament, Sora creates his own move, Avalanche Boost, but still loses the tournament to Kenta.
30	"The Bewitching Pisces"; Transliteration: "Ayashiki paishīzu" (Japanese: 妖しきパイシーズ)	Shunsuke Machitani	Masashi Suzuki	October 25, 2009	October 3, 2010
Ginga and the gang meet up at a tournament. But there is a mysterious atmosphere in one corner of the stadium as a mysterious blader Ryutaro tells fortunes... Ginga battles Ryutaro and creates a new move to defeat him and his Thermal Pisces.
31	"The Twin Gemios"; Transliteration: "Futago no jemiosu" (Japanese: 双子のジェミオス)	Hiroshi Kimura	Kiyoko Yoshimura	November 1, 2009	October 9, 2010
Four matches are going on in the tournament. As Hikaru and Kyoya's match begins, the others, who were busy congratulating Ginga, realize they're last and, in their haste, bump into Yu. Then Tsubasa turns up and Yu explains they're both part of the Dark Nebula. Despite the others' shock, Tsubasa leaves barely saying a word, ordering Yu to follow him away. Kyouya wins his match against Hikaru as Tsubasa wins his against Benkei. Kenta takes on the twins: Dan and Reiki, that Kyoya faced at Dark Nebula's original base with their new Bey Killer Gemios. They are on the verge of winning when the two start bickering and Kenta defeats them. Finally Yu wins his battle, but spends most of the time complaining about how only Tsubasa and Kenta appear to have good opponents.
32	"The Stormy Battle Royal"; Transliteration: "Arashi no batoru roiyaru" (Japanese: 嵐のバトルロイヤル)	Yasuyuki Fuse	Masaharu Amiya	November 8, 2009	October 16, 2010
The final six bladers of the tournament are: Ginga, Kenta, Kyoya, Yu, Tsubasa and Hyoma. Daidoji suggests they all battle against each other in a battle royal, mainly to see how well Tsubasa and Yu will get on batting together. Unfortunately, their hating of each other gets in the way and after taking out Hyoma, mainly by accident so they could get to Ginga, they start fighting each other. Pegasis plunders into the battle and all three lose. Finally Kyoya, who protected Sagittario whilst Yu and Tsubasa battled, defeats Kenta with a single hit and wins the tournament.
33	"The Oath of the Phoenix"; Transliteration: "Fenikkusu no chikai" (Japanese: 不死鳥(フェニックス)の誓い)	Yoshinori Odaka; Hiroya Saitō	Jirō Takayama	November 15, 2009	October 23, 2010
After the tournament, all the friends part ways. The Dark Nebula members head back to base, Yu though is still furious with Tsubasa. But without warning, the sneaky Tetsuya steals Ginga's point counter. It's rescued by a new and mysterious blader: Phoenix, who only agrees to give it back if Ginga can defeat him in a battle. Ginga loses to Phoenix, and Phoenix crushes his pointer.
34	"Shine, Virgo!"; Transliteration: "Kagayake Birugo!" (Japanese: 輝け乙女(ビルゴ)！)	Toshihito Naka	Kazuyuki Fudeyasu	November 22, 2009	October 30, 2010
Starting at square one, Ginga enters a tournament where he's challenged by a fan of his: Teru. Teru is a former dancer who suffered from an injury during one of his performances. When he was in hospital, he entertained himself by watching Ginga's battles. After a friend gave his Virgo, he has vowed to become a blader as strong as Ginga.
35	"L-Drago, on the Move"; Transliteration: "Erudorago shidō" (Japanese: エルドラゴ始動)	Yōsuke Hashiguchi	Katsumi Hasegawa	November 29, 2009	November 6, 2010
Ryuga has set out to obtain the 50,000 points to gain entry to Battle Bladers. He takes part in a 100 Bey battle Benkei is entering and wins with ease and also beats Tobio and Ryutaro in the finals of a tournament he interrupted. Tsubasa and Yu, who have finally stopped bickering, are supposed to be guarding him, but Tsubasa gets fed up and leaves whilst Yu heads back to base to cause trouble for him. Falling into a trap set by Daidoji, Tsubasa sees his chance to swipe information from the Dark Nebula database. Though just as he is leaving, he is intercepted by Daidoji and many bladers Yu summoned to help out. Then Ryuga turns up...
36	"Broken Wings"; Transliteration: "Hikisakareta tsubasa" (Japanese: 引き裂かれた翼)	Shunsuke Machitani	Masashi Suzuki; Katsumi Hasegawa	December 6, 2009	November 13, 2010
Tsubasa almost loses to Ryuga, but Aquila is saved by the sudden arrival of Phoenix. Taking pity on the young blader, Phoenix grabs Tsubasa and the two escape. Yu is at first really annoyed, but then he explains to Daidoji he has already sent a Dark Nebula member to keep an eye on Ginga. Tobio interrupts a tournament where Ginga has entered where the stadium has moving walls. Tobio had an early advantage, but in the end, Ginga triumphs with his special move.
37	"Rock Escolpio's Deadly Poison"; Transliteration: "Mōdoku esukorupio" (Japanese: 猛毒エスコルピオ)	Hiroshi Kimura	Kiyoko Yoshimura	December 13, 2009	November 20, 2010
Kenta arrives in a town where the kids are forbidden to battle in their stadium as it has been overrun by Busujima and a gang of bladers. Then Kenta's friend Sora turns up and they begin secret training to beat Busujima. Then one of their number vanishes and it's up to Sora to win her back. Sora battles Busujima, who creates a fire in the stadium. Ginga appears and puts out the fire with Storm Bringer and tells Sora to finish it. Sora calls on a new special move, O.V. Drive, and Cyber Pegasis knocks Rock Escolpio out of the stadium. The town has their stadium back and Sora celebrates with his idol Ginga.
38	"Run, Ginga!"; Transliteration: "Hashire! Ginga" (Japanese: 走れ！ 銀河)	Yasuyuki Fuse	Masaharu Amiya	December 20, 2009	November 27, 2010
Everyone has gained 50,000 points apart from Ginga, who is only 3,000 off. After learning of a nearby tournament, they all head there but are intercepted by Tsubasa. The others send Ginga on ahead whilst they distract Tsubasa, but this turns out to be what he wants. After Phoenix saved him, Tsubasa vowed to defeat Ryuga, but he was told to get to know Ginga's friends first. Kenta is willing to sacrifice everything for Ginga, but then the latter turns up, claiming he couldn't leave his friends behind. Tsuabsa becomes confused, but then Phoenix appears...
39	"Clash! The Phoenix vs The Pegasis"; Transliteration: "Gekitotsu! Fenikkusu VS Pegashisu" (Japanese: 激突！不死鳥(フェニックス)VS天馬(ペガシス))	Yoshinori Odaka; Hiroya Saitō	Katsumi Hasegawa	December 27, 2009	December 4, 2010
After Tsubasa is easily defeated by Phoenix, Ginga is also challenged. The rules are simple: if he wins, he gets his lost points back, but if he loses, he is forced to quit Beyblade. Everyone comes to show support for Ginga, even Kyoya. Finally Tsubasa understands what Phoenix had tried to tell him.
40	"GO! Battle Bladers!"; Transliteration: "GO! Batoru Burēdāzu!" (Japanese: GO！バトルブレーダーズ！)	Toshihito Naka	Kazuyuki Fudeyasu; Katsumi Hasegawa	January 10, 2010	December 11, 2010
Battle Bladers has begun and everyone is winning their battles with ease. Benkei defeats Tobio and Kenta defeats Tetsuya. But Ginga's first opponent is Yu, the only person besides Ryuga and Phoenix who has ever defeated him. In the end, Ginga defeats Yu.
41	"The Serpent's Terror"; Transliteration: "Sāpento no kyōfu" (Japanese: サーペントの恐怖)	Shin Tosaka	Kiyoko Yoshimura	January 17, 2010	December 18, 2010
Hyoma's next opponent is Reiji, a blader who believes in fear and sadness being an important matter in bey battling. The others become worried about Hikaru's match against Ryuga that puts her in a coma.
42	"The Dragon's Punishment"; Transliteration: "Doragon no seisai" (Japanese: ドラゴンの制裁)	Yōsuke Hashiguchi	Jirō Takayama	January 24, 2010	January 8, 2011
Yu and Ryutaro learn of the horrors of the Dark Nebula as Ryutaro watches as his defeated friends are taken down by Ryuga. Yu is forced to battle Reiji, he almost loses, and Libra becomes badly damaged. Meanwhile, Tsubasa considers taking Ryuga on himself in order to stop Kyoya from having to battle him, but Kyoya stops him.
43	"The Deck is Stacked"; Transliteration: "Shikumareta kādo" (Japanese: 仕組まれた対戦(カード))	Shunsuke Machitani	Masashi Suzuki	January 31, 2010	January 15, 2011
After a switch in the pairings, Kyoya is now battling Benkei, much to Tsubasa's delight as he now is battling Ryuga. Kyoya wins his battle, but Benkei is pleased to have shown his old master his true strength. Meanwhile, Ginga battles Ryutaro who, after watching the other Dark Nebula members fall at the hands of Ryuga, knows he is battling for his life. Ryutaro predicts a dark future for the world at the mercy of L-Drago, but after Ginga wins, his prediction changes and he accepts his fate. After the battle, an injured Yu stumbles in looking for Kenta and Ginga.
44	"Entrusted Emotions"; Transliteration: "Takusareta omoi" (Japanese: 託された想い)	Yasuyuki Fuse	Masaharu Amiya	February 7, 2010	January 22, 2011
Yu explains what has been happening within the Dark Nebula Organization, showing his broken Libra as proof. Ginga is furious, but not so much as Kenta who, after swapping Bottoms, storms off to find and battle Reiji. The battle is intense, but Reiji defeats Kenta by breaking the claws off of Sagittario's Track.
45	"Aquila Strikes Back"; Transliteration: "Gyakushū no Akuira" (Japanese: 逆襲のアクイラ)	Yoshinori Odaka; Hiroya Saitō	Katsumi Hasegawa	February 14, 2010	January 29, 2011
After Kenta and Yu's battle of will, everyone is looking for Tsubasa who has gone missing. He eventually shows up for his battle after some backup from Kyoya. The odds are stacked against Tsubasa, but after battling Ryuga once before, is there a chance he could win? However, Tsubasa loses to Ryuga who infects Tsubasa with L-Drago's Dark Power, causing the Dark Aquila events in Metal Masters.
46	"Libra Disappears"; Transliteration: "Kieta Ribura" (Japanese: 消えたリブラ)	Toshihito Naka	Kiyoko Yoshimura	February 21, 2010	February 5, 2011
Ginga prepares to battle Reiji who is stronger than in his first two battles. Meanwhile, Yu is kidnapped, and Kenta and Hyoma, who have both recovered from their battles with Reiji, race into the Dark Nebula Organization's HQ to get him back.
47	"Bonds of Steel"; Transliteration: "Hagane no kizuna" (Japanese: 鋼の絆)	Shin Tosaka	Kazuyuki Fudeyasu	February 28, 2010	February 12, 2011
Ginga finally defeats Reiji, avenging the losses of Hyoma and Kenta. Phoenix appears to protect Kenta and Hyoma, beating Daidoji. Madoka tells Ginga about Yu, Kenta and Hyoma and the two rush after them. All of them regroup as shards fall from the ceiling, trapping Daidoji and shattering Phoenix's mask.
48	"The Truth of Light and Darkness"; Transliteration: "Hikari to yami no shinjitsu" (Japanese: 光と闇の真実)	Yōsuke Hashiguchi	Katsumi Hasegawa	March 7, 2010	February 19, 2011
Phoenix, who is really Ryusei Hagane, helps to rescue Yu. Then he explains to everyone about why he hid his identity, starting with the origin of Beys, starting with Pegasis and L-Drago. Meanwhile, Daidoji comes across Ryuga who is anxious for more power and knows where to get it. He therefore takes all of Daidoji's power and stores it in L-Drago.
49	"Fierce Battle! Lion VS Dragon"; Transliteration: "Gekisen! Shishi tai ryū" (Japanese: 激戦！獅子対竜)	Yoshitaka Fujimoto	Jirō Takayama	March 14, 2010	February 26, 2011
Kyoya finally gets to battle Ryuga, determined to avenge Tsubasa who had become a close friend. After persuading Ryuga not to use his special move, it really looked like Kyoya could win. But L-Drago had appeared to take too much battering from Leone, adding to its already brimming power, pouring it into Ryuga as the dragon spirits physically enter his body, mutating him partially into a dragon-like monster. Kyoya tries to hold his ground, but in the end he devastatingly loses, in a massive turn of events, and suffers the same fate as Hikaru and Tsubasa.
50	"The Furious Final Battle!"; Transliteration: "Ikari no fainaru batoru!" (Japanese: 怒りの最終決戦(ファイナルバトル)！)	Yasuyuki Fuse	Katsumi Hasegawa	March 21, 2010	March 5, 2011
Upset at the fate of his friends, Ginga goes alone to the final battle. Ryuga battles him on a stage in the air, where Ginga struggles at first to defeat Ryuga, with his two special moves blocked by the latter. As L-Drago siphons the power from Pegasis and into Ryuga (with Ryuga laughing loudly and evilly), Ginga's friends come to help, giving him more strength for beating back Ryuga. However, as Ginga is ready to complete the "final retaliation", L-Drago again pours all its power into Ryuga, mutating him partially into a dragon, nothing like himself, but more masculine, and with glowing red eyes without pupils, and two purple trickles of fumes from his mouth, as well as a ripped vest, no cape, pointier nose, pointy teeth, many popping out veins, darker hair, and his voice combined with L-Drago's, showing that Ryuga was not himself.
51	"Blader's Spirit"; Transliteration: "Burēdā no tamashī" (Japanese: ブレーダーの心)	Yoshinori Odaka; Hiroya Saitō	Katsumi Hasegawa	March 28, 2010	March 12, 2011
Ryuga is first completely agonized and tries to fight L-Drago from conquering him, fading in and out and trying to talk. In the end, he gets more pained and agonized as he collapses forward with a big explosion, jolting back with each of the dragons entering and re-entering him, then lunging forwards again after each one, roaring in agony, as Ginga and his friends watch in muted horror. Ryusei then appears and explains to Ginga's friends that since L-Drago didn't belong to any one person in the first place, it consumed and destroyed that person since its power was too much for that one person alone, as it's visible when Ryuga violently struggles with a headache caused by L-Drago. L-Drago then manipulates Ryuga's mind once again, bringing him to L-Drago's senses, syncing him with his bey, and then rampages, laughing out purple dark energy, sending Ginga flying for its sheer amusement. Despite Ginga's initial efforts to fight the situation, Hyoma tells him that the one standing there isn't Ryuga any longer, which 'L-Drago' delights in, trying to absorb Ginga as sustenance. However, when L-Drago tries to destroy Ginga himself, Ginga is protected by the spirits of Kyoya, Hikaru, and Tsubasa, forming a wall. They tell him to use his Blader's Spirit and protect theirs. Finally, he realizes he can win with his greatest special move - Galaxy Nova, as well as his friends' and his own Blader's Spirit. This fractures L-Drago and is so powerful that both Bladers lose their balance and fall to the ground from 500 feet up. Ginga is rescued by his Bey Pegasis, and they rescue Ryuga, back to his normal self, as the Dark Power drained out of him during freefall. But Pegasis vanishes soon after landing, having over-exerted itself in the battle. Ryusei reassures him that Pegasis will return to life again and will spread its wings once again.
