= List of Beyblade: Metal Saga episodes =

The logo of the Metal Fight Beyblade anime series

Beyblade: Metal Fusion, known in Japan as Metal Fight Beyblade (メタルファイト ベイブレード, Metaru Faito Beiburēdo) is a Japanese manga and anime. It is a spin-off of the original Beyblade series, and was created by Tatsunoko Pro, Synergy SP, is co-produced by Nelvana. This Beyblade series features a complete new set of characters, and a new story.

== Series overview ==
No.	Title	Episodes	Run	Director	Studio	Network
1	Beyblade: Metal Fusion	51	April 5, 2009 – March 28, 2010	Kunihisa Sugishima	Tatsunoko	TV Tokyo
2	Beyblade: Metal Masters	51	April 4, 2010 – March 27, 2011	Kunihisa Sugishima	SynergySP	TV Tokyo
3	Beyblade: Metal Fury	52 (Japanese version); 39 (English version)	April 3, 2011 – April 1, 2012	Kunihisa Sugishima	SynergySP	TV Tokyo
4	Beyblade: Shogun Steel	45 (Japanese version); 26 (English version)	April 8, 2012 – December 23, 2012	Kunihisa Sugishima	SynergySP	TXN (TV Tokyo)

== Episode list ==
=== Beyblade: Metal Fusion (2009–10) ===
No.	Title	Directed by	Written by	Original release date	English air date
1	"Pegasis Has Landed!"; Transliteration: "Maiorita pegashisu!" (Japanese: 舞い降りた天馬(ペガシス)！)	Yoshinori Odaka	Katsumi Hasegawa	April 5, 2009	May 15, 2010 (Canada); June 26, 2010 (USA)
2	"Leone's Fangs!"; Transliteration: "Reōne no kiba!" (Japanese: 獅子(レオーネ)の牙！)	Hiroya Saitō	Katsumi Hasegawa	April 12, 2009	May 15, 2010 (Canada); June 27, 2010 (USA)
3	"The Wolf's Ambition!"; Transliteration: "Vorufu no yabō!" (Japanese: 狼(ヴォルフ)の野望！)	Toshihito Naka	Katsumi Hasegawa	April 19, 2009	May 15, 2010 (Canada); July 3, 2010 (USA)
4	"Charge! Bull Power!"; Transliteration: "Tosshin! Buru pawā!" (Japanese: 突進！牡牛(ブル)パワー！)	Yōsuke Hashiguchi	Masaharu Amiya	April 26, 2009	May 15, 2010 (Canada); July 4, 2010 (USA)
5	"Vengeful Cancer"; Transliteration: "Fukushū no Kyansā" (Japanese: 復讐のキャンサー)	Naruyo Takahashi	Kazuyuki Fudeyasu	May 3, 2009	May 22, 2010 (Canada); July 10, 2010 (USA)
6	"Aquario's Challenge"; Transliteration: "Akuario no chōsen" (Japanese: アクアリオの挑戦)	Shinya Watada	Mitsuhiro Yamada	May 10, 2009	May 29, 2010 (Canada); July 11, 2010 (USA)
7	"It's Our Special Move! Sagittario"; Transliteration: "Hissatsu tengi da! Sajitario" (Japanese: 必殺転技だ！サジタリオ)	Yoshinori Odaka	Katsumi Hasegawa	May 17, 2009	June 5, 2010 (Canada); July 17, 2010 (USA)
8	"Merci's Dangerous Trap"; Transliteration: "Merushī no kiken na wana" (Japanese: メルシーの危険な罠)	Hiroya Saitō	Jukki Hanada	May 24, 2009	June 12, 2010 (Canada); July 18, 2010 (USA)
9	"Leone's Counterattack"; Transliteration: "Reōne no gyakushū" (Japanese: 獅子王(レオーネ)の逆襲)	Toshihito Naka	Masaharu Amiya	May 31, 2009	June 19, 2010 (Canada); July 24, 2010 (USA)
10	"Heated Battle! Ginga VS Kyoya"; Transliteration: "Gekitō! Ginga VS Kyōya" (Japanese: 激闘！銀河VSキョウヤ)	Yōsuke Hashiguchi	Kazuyuki Fudeyasu	June 7, 2009	June 26, 2010 (Canada); July 25, 2010 (USA)
11	"Chase the Wolf!"; Transliteration: "Vorufu o oe!" (Japanese: 狼(ヴォルフ)を追え！)	Hiroya Saitō	Katsumi Hasegawa	June 14, 2009	July 31, 2010
12	"Infiltrate the Dark Nebula's Castle!"; Transliteration: "Sennyū! Dāku nebyura no shiro" (Japanese: 潜入！ダークネビュラの城)	Masahito Otani	Mitsuhiro Yamada; Katsumi Hasegawa	June 21, 2009	August 1, 2010
13	"L-Drago Awakens!"; Transliteration: "Erudorago, kakusei!" (Japanese: 竜皇(エルドラゴ)、覚醒！)	Yoshinori Odaka	Katsumi Hasegawa	June 28, 2009	August 7, 2010
14	"Memories of Ryūsei"; Transliteration: "Ryūsei no kioku" (Japanese: 流星の記憶)	Toshihito Naka	Jukki Hanada	July 5, 2009	August 8, 2010
15	"Mysterious Hyoma"; Transliteration: "Nazo no Hyouma" (Japanese: 謎の氷魔)	Yōsuke Hashiguchi	Masaharu Amiya	July 12, 2009	August 14, 2010
16	"The Magnificent Aries"; Transliteration: "Karei naru Ariesu" (Japanese: 華麗なるアリエス)	Shunsuke Machitani	Kazuyuki Fudeyasu	July 19, 2009	August 15, 2010
17	"The Silver Pegasis"; Transliteration: "Shirogane no pegashisu" (Japanese: 白銀の天馬(ペガシス)！)	Eisuke Hayashi	Jirō Takayama	July 26, 2009	August 21, 2010
18	"The Green Hell"; Transliteration: "Midori no jigoku" (Japanese: 緑の地獄)	Yasuyuki Fuse	Masashi Suzuki	August 2, 2009	August 22, 2010
19	"Conquer the Tag-Team Battle!"; Transliteration: "Taggu batoru o kōryaku seyo!" (Japanese: タッグバトルを攻略せよ！)	Yoshinori Odaka; Hiroya Saitō	Masaharu Amiya	August 9, 2009	August 28, 2010
20	"Begin the Survival Battle!"; Transliteration: "Kaimaku! Sabaibaru batoru" (Japanese: 開幕！サバイバルバトル)	Norio Kashima	Kazuyuki Fudeyasu	August 16, 2009	August 29, 2010
21	"Warriors on a Solitary Island"; Transliteration: "Kotō no senshi-tachi" (Japanese: 孤島の戦士たち)	Toshihito Naka	Jirō Takayama	August 23, 2009	September 4, 2010
22	"The Fearsome Libra"; Transliteration: "Senritsu no Ribura" (Japanese: 戦慄のリブラ)	Yōsuke Hashiguchi	Masashi Suzuki; Katsumi Hasegawa	August 30, 2009	September 5, 2010
23	"The Road to the Battle Bladers"; Transliteration: "Batoru Burēdāzu e no michi" (Japanese: バトルブレーダーズへの道)	Shunsuke Machitani	Katsumi Hasegawa	September 6, 2009	September 11, 2010
24	"The Beautiful Aquila"; Transliteration: "Utsukushiki Akuira" (Japanese: 美しき鷲(アクイラ))	Hiroshi Kimura	Kazuyuki Fudeyasu	September 13, 2009	September 12, 2010
25	"The Sniper Capricorne"; Transliteration: "Sunaipā kapurikōne" (Japanese: 狙撃手(スナイパー)カプリコーネ)	Yasuyuki Fuse	Masaharu Amiya	September 20, 2009	September 18, 2010
26	"Tsubasa Flies Into The Dark"; Transliteration: "Yami ni mau Tsubasa" (Japanese: 闇に舞う翼)	Yoshinori Odaka; Hiroya Saitō	Jirō Takayama	September 27, 2009	September 19, 2010
27	"Intruders in the Challenge Match"; Transliteration: "Rannyū! Charenji matchi" (Japanese: 乱入！チャレンジマッチ)	Masahito Otani	Masashi Suzuki	October 4, 2009	September 25, 2010
28	"Dark Cancer's Big, Crabby-Crabby Operation!"; Transliteration: "Dāku Kyansā no kanikani daisakusen!" (Japanese: ダークキャンサーのカニカニ大作戦！)	Toshihito Naka	Kazuyuki Fudeyasu	October 11, 2009	September 26, 2010
29	"Kenta and Sora"; Transliteration: "Kenta to Sora" (Japanese: ケンタと宇宙)	Yōsuke Hashiguchi	Katsumi Hasegawa	October 18, 2009	October 2, 2010
30	"The Bewitching Pisces"; Transliteration: "Ayashiki paishīzu" (Japanese: 妖しきパイシーズ)	Shunsuke Machitani	Masashi Suzuki	October 25, 2009	October 3, 2010
31	"The Twin Gemios"; Transliteration: "Futago no jemiosu" (Japanese: 双子のジェミオス)	Hiroshi Kimura	Kiyoko Yoshimura	November 1, 2009	October 9, 2010
32	"The Stormy Battle Royal"; Transliteration: "Arashi no batoru roiyaru" (Japanese: 嵐のバトルロイヤル)	Yasuyuki Fuse	Masaharu Amiya	November 8, 2009	October 16, 2010
33	"The Oath of the Phoenix"; Transliteration: "Fenikkusu no chikai" (Japanese: 不死鳥(フェニックス)の誓い)	Yoshinori Odaka; Hiroya Saitō	Jirō Takayama	November 15, 2009	October 23, 2010
34	"Shine, Virgo!"; Transliteration: "Kagayake Birugo!" (Japanese: 輝け乙女(ビルゴ)！)	Toshihito Naka	Kazuyuki Fudeyasu	November 22, 2009	October 30, 2010
35	"L-Drago, on the Move"; Transliteration: "Erudorago shidō" (Japanese: エルドラゴ始動)	Yōsuke Hashiguchi	Katsumi Hasegawa	November 29, 2009	November 6, 2010
36	"Broken Wings"; Transliteration: "Hikisakareta tsubasa" (Japanese: 引き裂かれた翼)	Shunsuke Machitani	Masashi Suzuki; Katsumi Hasegawa	December 6, 2009	November 13, 2010
37	"Rock Escolpio's Deadly Poison"; Transliteration: "Mōdoku esukorupio" (Japanese: 猛毒エスコルピオ)	Hiroshi Kimura	Kiyoko Yoshimura	December 13, 2009	November 20, 2010
38	"Run, Ginga!"; Transliteration: "Hashire! Ginga" (Japanese: 走れ！ 銀河)	Yasuyuki Fuse	Masaharu Amiya	December 20, 2009	November 27, 2010
39	"Clash! The Phoenix vs The Pegasis"; Transliteration: "Gekitotsu! Fenikkusu VS Pegashisu" (Japanese: 激突！不死鳥(フェニックス)VS天馬(ペガシス))	Yoshinori Odaka; Hiroya Saitō	Katsumi Hasegawa	December 27, 2009	December 4, 2010
40	"GO! Battle Bladers!"; Transliteration: "GO! Batoru Burēdāzu!" (Japanese: GO！バトルブレーダーズ！)	Toshihito Naka	Kazuyuki Fudeyasu; Katsumi Hasegawa	January 10, 2010	December 11, 2010
41	"The Serpent's Terror"; Transliteration: "Sāpento no kyōfu" (Japanese: サーペントの恐怖)	Shin Tosaka	Kiyoko Yoshimura	January 17, 2010	December 18, 2010
42	"The Dragon's Punishment"; Transliteration: "Doragon no seisai" (Japanese: ドラゴンの制裁)	Yōsuke Hashiguchi	Jirō Takayama	January 24, 2010	January 8, 2011
43	"The Deck is Stacked"; Transliteration: "Shikumareta kādo" (Japanese: 仕組まれた対戦(カード))	Shunsuke Machitani	Masashi Suzuki	January 31, 2010	January 15, 2011
44	"Entrusted Emotions"; Transliteration: "Takusareta omoi" (Japanese: 託された想い)	Yasuyuki Fuse	Masaharu Amiya	February 7, 2010	January 22, 2011
45	"Aquila Strikes Back"; Transliteration: "Gyakushū no Akuira" (Japanese: 逆襲のアクイラ)	Yoshinori Odaka; Hiroya Saitō	Katsumi Hasegawa	February 14, 2010	January 29, 2011
46	"Libra Disappears"; Transliteration: "Kieta Ribura" (Japanese: 消えたリブラ)	Toshihito Naka	Kiyoko Yoshimura	February 21, 2010	February 5, 2011
47	"Bonds of Steel"; Transliteration: "Hagane no kizuna" (Japanese: 鋼の絆)	Shin Tosaka	Kazuyuki Fudeyasu	February 28, 2010	February 12, 2011
48	"The Truth of Light and Darkness"; Transliteration: "Hikari to yami no shinjitsu" (Japanese: 光と闇の真実)	Yōsuke Hashiguchi	Katsumi Hasegawa	March 7, 2010	February 19, 2011
49	"Fierce Battle! Lion VS Dragon"; Transliteration: "Gekisen! Shishi tai ryū" (Japanese: 激戦！獅子対竜)	Yoshitaka Fujimoto	Jirō Takayama	March 14, 2010	February 26, 2011
50	"The Furious Final Battle!"; Transliteration: "Ikari no fainaru batoru!" (Japanese: 怒りの最終決戦(ファイナルバトル)！)	Yasuyuki Fuse	Katsumi Hasegawa	March 21, 2010	March 5, 2011
51	"Blader's Spirit"; Transliteration: "Burēdā no tamashī" (Japanese: ブレーダーの心)	Yoshinori Odaka; Hiroya Saitō	Katsumi Hasegawa	March 28, 2010	March 12, 2011

=== Beyblade: Metal Masters (2010–11) ===
No. overall	No. in season	Title	Original release date	English air date
52	1	"Seeking the Legend"; Transliteration: "Densetsu o motomete" (Japanese: 伝説を求めて)	April 4, 2010	July 25, 2011 (AUS); August 20, 2011 (US)
53	2	"The Persistent Challenger"; Transliteration: "Fukutsu no charenjaa" (Japanese: 不屈の一角獣 (チャレンジャー))	April 11, 2010	July 26, 2011 (AUS); August 20, 2011 (USA)
54	3	"A New Challenge"; Transliteration: "Aratanaru chousen" (Japanese: 新たなる挑戦)	April 18, 2010	July 27, 2011 (AUS); August 20, 2011 (USA)
55	4	"Ticket to the World"; Transliteration: "Sekai he no kippu" (Japanese: 世界への切符)	April 25, 2010	July 28, 2011 (AUS); August 27, 2011 (USA)
56	5	"Final Battle! Leone VS Eagle"; Transliteration: "Kessen! Reoone VS Akuira" (Japanese: 決戦!レオーネVSアクイラ)	May 2, 2010	July 29, 2011 (AUS); September 3, 2011 (USA)
57	6	"Soar Into the World"; Transliteration: "Shouke, sekai he!" (Japanese: 翔け、世界へ!)	May 9, 2010	August 1, 2011 (AUS); September 10, 2011 (USA)
58	7	"The Beylin Temple in the Sky"; Transliteration: "Tenkuu no Beirinji" (Japanese: 天空のベイ林寺)	May 16, 2010	August 2, 2011 (AUS); September 17, 2011 (USA)
59	8	"The Third Man"; Transliteration: "Daisan no otoko" (Japanese: 第三の男)	May 23, 2010	August 3, 2011 (AUS); September 24, 2011 (USA)
60	9	"The World Championships Begin!"; Transliteration: "Kaimaku! Sekai Taikai" (Japanese: 開幕!世界大会)	May 30, 2010	August 4, 2011 (AUS); October 1, 2011 (USA)
61	10	"Lacerta's Will"; Transliteration: "Racheruta no iji" (Japanese: ラチェルタの意地)	June 6, 2010	August 5, 2011 (AUS); October 8, 2011 (USA)
62	11	"The 4000 Year Old Secret"; Transliteration: "Yonsennen no ougi" (Japanese: 四千年の奥義)	June 13, 2010	August 8, 2011 (AUS); October 15, 2011 (USA)
63	12	"The Bey with a Hero's Name"; Transliteration: "Yuusha no mei o motsu Bei" (Japanese: 勇者の名を持つベイ)	June 20, 2010	August 9, 2011 (AUS); October 22, 2011 (USA)
64	13	"The Wintry Land of Russia"; Transliteration: "Goukan no chi Roshia" (Japanese: 極寒の地ロシア)	June 27, 2010	August 10, 2011 (AUS); October 29, 2011 (USA)
65	14	"How Grand! The Cage Match"; Transliteration: "Souzetsu! Kanaami Desumacchi!" (Japanese: 壮絶!金網デスマッチ!)	July 4, 2010	August 11, 2011 (AUS); November 5, 2011 (USA)
66	15	"Libra Departs for the Front!"; Transliteration: "Ribura shutsujin!" (Japanese: リブラ出陣!)	July 11, 2010	August 12, 2011 (AUS); November 12, 2011 (USA)
67	16	"The Festival of Warriors"; Transliteration: "Senshi no saiten" (Japanese: 戦士の祭典)	July 18, 2010	August 15, 2011 (AUS); November 19, 2011 (USA)
68	17	"We Meet Again! Wang Hu Zhong"; Transliteration: "Saikai! Wanfuujon" (Japanese: 再会! 王虎衆 (ワンフージョン))	July 25, 2010	August 16, 2011 (AUS); November 26, 2011 (USA)
69	18	"The Scorching Hot Lion"; Transliteration: "Shakunetsu no shishi" (Japanese: 灼熱の獅子)	August 1, 2010	August 17, 2011 (AUS); December 3, 2011 (USA)
70	19	"The Shocking Wild Fang"; Transliteration: "Shougeki no Wairudo Fangu" (Japanese: 衝撃のワイルドファング)	August 8, 2010	August 18, 2011 (AUS); December 10, 2011 (USA)
71	20	"Horuseus VS Striker"; Transliteration: "Tenku no kami (Horuseusu) VS Ikakkuju (Yunikoruno)" (Japanese: 天空の神 (ホルセウス) VS一角獣 (ユニコルノ))	August 15, 2010	August 19, 2011 (AUS); December 17, 2011 (USA)
72	21	"Eternal Rivals"; Transliteration: "Shukumei no koutekishu (raibaru)" (Japanese: 宿命の好敵手 (ライバル))	August 22, 2010	December 6, 2011 (AUS); December 31, 2011 (USA)
73	22	"The Third Match: On The Edge"; Transliteration: "Gakeppuchi no daisan shiai" (Japanese: 崖っぷちの第三試合)	August 29, 2010	December 7, 2011 (AUS); January 7, 2012 (USA)
74	23	"The End Of A Fierce Struggle!"; Transliteration: "Shitou no hate!" (Japanese: 死闘の果て!)	September 5, 2010	December 8, 2011 (AUS); January 14, 2012 (USA)
75	24	"The Creeping Darkness"; Transliteration: "Shinobi yoru yami" (Japanese: 忍びよる闇)	September 12, 2010	December 9, 2011 (AUS); January 21, 2012 (USA)
76	25	"The Axe Of Destruction"; Transliteration: "Hakai no ono" (Japanese: 破壊の斧)	September 19, 2010	December 12, 2011 (AUS); January 28, 2012 (USA)
77	26	"The Dragon Emperor Returns"; Transliteration: "Ryuuoh (Eru Dorago), futatabi" (Japanese: 竜皇 (エルドラゴ)、再び)	September 26, 2010	December 13, 2011 (AUS); February 4, 2012 (USA)
78	27	"Exceed The Limit!"; Transliteration: "Genkai o koero!" (Japanese: 限界を越えろ!)	October 3, 2010	February 11, 2012 (USA); March 24, 2012 (AUS)
79	28	"Dark Eagle"; Transliteration: "Daaku Akuira" (Japanese: 暗黒鷲 (ダークアクイラ))	October 10, 2010	February 18, 2012 (USA); March 24, 2012 (AUS)
80	29	"Gravity Destroyer"; Transliteration: "Gurabitei Peruseusu" (Japanese: グラビティペルセウス)	October 17, 2010	February 25, 2012 (USA); March 31, 2012 (AUS)
81	30	"The Midday Street Battle"; Transliteration: "Hakuchu no Sutoriito Batoru" (Japanese: 白昼のストリートバトル)	October 24, 2010	March 3, 2012 (USA); March 31, 2012 (AUS)
82	31	"The Brazilian Trap"; Transliteration: "Burajirian torappu" (Japanese: ブラジリアントラップ)	October 31, 2010	March 10, 2012 (USA & Canada)
83	32	"The Explosive Cyclone Battle!"; Transliteration: "Bakutou! Toruneedo Batoru" (Japanese: 爆闘! トルネードバトル)	November 7, 2010	March 10, 2012 (Canada); March 17, 2012 (USA)
84	33	"Charge! Ray Gil!"; Transliteration: "Gekisou! Rei Giru!" (Japanese: 激走! レイギル)	November 14, 2010	March 10, 2012 (Canada); March 24, 2012 (USA)
85	34	"The Friend's Name is Zeo"; Transliteration: "Tomo no mei ha Zeo" (Japanese: 友の名はゼオ)	November 21, 2010	March 17, 2012 (Canada); March 31, 2012 (USA)
86	35	"Our Slogan Is Number 1"; Transliteration: "Aikotoba ha NO.1" (Japanese: 合言葉はNO.1)	November 28, 2010	March 24, 2012 (Canada); April 7, 2012 (USA)
87	36	"The Plot Thickens"; Transliteration: "Ugoki hajime ta inbou" (Japanese: 動き始めた陰謀)	December 5, 2010	March 31, 2012 (Canada); April 14, 2012 (USA)
88	37	"The Compass of Fate: Byxis"; Transliteration: "Unmei no Bikushisu" (Japanese: 運命の羅針盤 (ビクシス))	December 12, 2010	April 7, 2012 (Canada); April 21, 2012 (USA)
89	38	"The Wicked Peacock: Befall"; Transliteration: "Kyouki no Bifooru" (Japanese: 凶気の孔雀 (ビフォール))	December 19, 2010	April 14, 2012 (Canada); April 28, 2012 (USA)
90	39	"The Guard Dog of Hades: Kerbecs"; Transliteration: "Jigoku no Kerubekusu" (Japanese: 地獄の番犬 (ケルベクス))	December 26, 2010	April 21, 2012 (Canada); May 5, 2012 (USA)
91	40	"The Furious DJ Battle!?"; Transliteration: "Hakunetsu no DJ Batoru!?" (Japanese: 白熱のDJバトル!?)	January 9, 2011	April 28, 2012 (Canada); May 12, 2012 (USA)
92	41	"The Final Countdown"; Transliteration: "Fainaru Kauntdaun" (Japanese: ファイナル・カウントダウン)	January 16, 2011	May 5, 2012 (Canada); May 19, 2012 (USA)
93	42	"The Dragon Emperor Descends"; Transliteration: "Ryuuou, kourin" (Japanese: 竜皇、降臨)	January 23, 2011	May 12, 2012 (Canada); May 26, 2012 (USA)
94	43	"Spirits' Last Battle"; Transliteration: "Tamashii no Rasuto Batoru" (Japanese: 魂のラストバトル)	January 30, 2011	May 19, 2012 (Canada); June 2, 2012 (USA)
95	44	"Showdown! Gingka vs. Damian"; Transliteration: "Ketchaku! Ginga VS Damian" (Japanese: 決着! 銀河VSダミアン)	February 6, 2011	May 26, 2012 (Canada); June 9, 2012 (USA)
96	45	"The Miraculous Spiral Force"; Transliteration: "Kyoui no Supairaru Fousu" (Japanese: 驚異のスパイラルフォース)	February 13, 2011	June 2, 2012 (Canada); June 16, 2012 (USA)
97	46	"Charge! Hades City"; Transliteration: "Totsunyuu! Hadesu Shiti" (Japanese: 突入!ハデスシティ)	February 20, 2011	June 9, 2012 (Canada); June 23, 2012 (USA)
98	47	"The Fallen Emperor"; Transliteration: "Ochita koutei" (Japanese: 堕ちた皇帝)	February 27, 2011	June 16, 2012 (Canada); June 30, 2012 (USA)
99	48	"Befall's Trap"; Transliteration: "Gemiozu no wana" (Japanese: ビフォールの罠)	March 6, 2011	June 23, 2012 (Canada); July 7, 2012 (USA)
100	49	"The Wild Beast Unleashed"; Transliteration: "Houttareta yajuu" (Japanese: 放たれた野獣)	March 13, 2011	July 7, 2012 (Canada); July 14, 2012 (USA)
101	50	"Rampage! Tempo"; Transliteration: "Bousou! Horogiumu" (Japanese: 暴走!ホロギウム)	March 20, 2011	July 14, 2012 (Canada); July 21, 2012 (USA)
102	51	"Galaxy Heart"; Transliteration: "Gyarakushii Haato" (Japanese: ギャラクシーハート)	March 27, 2011	July 21, 2012 (Canada); July 28, 2012 (USA)

=== Beyblade: Metal Fury (2011–12) ===
No. overall	No. in season	Title	Original release date	English air date
103	1	"Star Fragment"; Transliteration: "Hoshi no Kakera" (Japanese: 星の欠)	April 3, 2011	October 13, 2012 (US); April 30, 2013 (AUS)
104	2	"Legendary Bladers"; Transliteration: "Rejiendo Burēdā" (Japanese: レジェンドブレー)	April 10, 2011	October 20, 2012 (US); May 1, 2013 (AUS)
105	3	"Lynx, The Monster Cat"; Transliteration: "Kaibyō Rinkusu" (Japanese: 怪猫リンクス)	April 17, 2011	October 27, 2012 (US); May 2, 2013 (AUS)
106	4	"L-Drago Destructor"; Transliteration: "Eru Dorago Desutoroi" (Japanese: エルドラゴデストロイ)	April 24, 2011	November 3, 2012 (US); May 3, 2013 (AUS)
107	5	"Awaken Anubius!"; Transliteration: "Kakusei! Anubiusu" (Japanese: 覚醒! アヌビウス)	May 1, 2011	November 10, 2012 (US); May 7, 2013 (AUS)
108	6	"Requirements of a Warrior"; Transliteration: "Senshi no Shikaku" (Japanese: 戦士の資格)	May 8, 2011	November 17, 2012 (US); May 8, 2013 (AUS)
109	7	"Kenta's Determination"; Transliteration: "Kenta no Ketsui" (Japanese: ケンタの決意)	May 15, 2011	November 24, 2012 (US); May 9, 2013 (AUS)
110	8	"The Crimson Flash"; Transliteration: "Shinku no senkō" (Japanese: 真紅の閃光)	May 22, 2011	December 1, 2012 (US); May 10, 2013 (AUS)
111	9	"The Greatest Tag-Team Tournament"; Transliteration: "Saikyō taggu-sen, touryūmon" (Japanese: 最強タッグ戦、登竜門)	May 29, 2011	December 8, 2012 (US); May 15, 2013 (AUS)
112	10	"A New Roar!"; Transliteration: "Aratanaru hōkō!" (Japanese: 新たなる咆哮)	June 5, 2011	December 15, 2012 (US); May 16, 2013 (AUS)
113	11	"Cosmic Tornado"; Transliteration: "Biggu Ban Torunēdo" (Japanese: ビッグバントルネード)	June 12, 2011	December 22, 2012 (US); May 17, 2013 (AUS)
114	12	"The God of Saturn, Kronos"; Transliteration: "Doseishin Kuronosu" (Japanese: 土星神クロノス)	June 19, 2011	January 5, 2013 (US); May 21, 2013 (AUS)
115	13	"Showdown at the Tower of Babel"; Transliteration: "Taiketsu! Baberu no Tō" (Japanese: 対決! バベルの塔)	June 26, 2011	January 12, 2013 (US); May 22, 2013 (AUS)
116	14	"New Team Dungeon!"; Transliteration: "Shinsei! Chīmu Danjon" (Japanese: 新生! チーム・ダンジョン)	July 3, 2011	January 19, 2013 (US); May 23, 2013 (AUS)
117	15	"Destroyer Dome"; Transliteration: "Sufia Surīshikkusuzero" (Japanese: スフィア360)	July 10, 2011	January 26, 2013 (US); May 24, 2013 (AUS)
118	16	"New Striker is Complete!"; Transliteration: "Kansei! Shin Yunikoruno" (Japanese: 完成！新ユニコルノ)	July 17, 2011	February 2, 2013 (US); May 28, 2013 (AUS)
119	17	"I Am the Champion!"; Transliteration: "Ore-sama koso ga chanpion!" (Japanese: オレさまこそがチャンピオン！)	July 24, 2011	February 9, 2013 (US); May 29, 2013 (AUS)
120	18	"Maze of Mist Mountain"; Transliteration: "Misuto Maunten no meikyū" (Japanese: ミストマウンテンの迷宮)	July 31, 2011	February 16, 2013 (US); May 30, 2013 (AUS)
121	19	"The Lion's Pride"; Transliteration: "Shishi no puraido" (Japanese: 獅子のプライド)	August 7, 2011	February 23, 2013 (US); May 31, 2013 (AUS)
122	20	"Guardian of the Temple, Dynamis"; Transliteration: "Shinden no shugosha Dyunamisu" (Japanese: 神殿の守護者デュナミス)	August 14, 2011	March 2, 2013 (US); June 4, 2013 (AUS)
123	21	"The Legend of Nemesis' Revival"; Transliteration: "Nemeshisu, fukkatsu no densetsu" (Japanese: ネメシス、復活の伝説)	August 21, 2011	March 9, 2013 (US); June 5, 2013 (AUS)
124	22	"The Four Season Bladers"; Transliteration: "Shiki no Burēdā" (Japanese: 四季の戦士(ブレーダー))	August 28, 2011	March 16, 2013 (US); June 6, 2013 (AUS)
125	23	"The Battle of Beyster Island"; Transliteration: "Beisutā tō no tatakai" (Japanese: ベイスター島の戦い)	September 4, 2011	March 23, 2013 (US); June 7, 2013 (AUS)
126	24	"Two Big, Fierce Battles!"; Transliteration: "Gekiretsu! Ni Dai Batoru" (Japanese: 激烈!二大バトル)	September 11, 2011	March 30, 2013 (US); June 11, 2013 (AUS)
127	25	"The Unseen Opponent"; Transliteration: "Sugatanaki Burēdā" (Japanese: 姿なき対戦者（ブレーダー）)	September 18, 2011	April 6, 2013 (US); June 12, 2013 (AUS)
128	26	"Orion's Whereabouts"; Transliteration: "Orion no yukue" (Japanese: オリオンの行方)	September 25, 2011	April 13, 2013 (US); July 5, 2013 (AUS)
129	27	"The Lion in the Wilderness (Part 1)"; Transliteration: "Arano o iku shishi" (Japanese: 荒野を行く獅子)	October 2, 2011	April 20, 2013 (US); June 13, 2013 (AUS)
130	28	"The Lion in the Wilderness (Part 2)"; Transliteration: "Monsutā no shōtai" (Japanese: 怪物の正体)	October 9, 2011	April 20, 2013 (US); June 13, 2013 (AUS)
131	29	"The God of Venus: Quetzalcoatl (Part 1)"; Transliteration: "Kinseishin Ketsuarukoatoru" (Japanese: 金星神ケツァルコアトル)	October 16, 2011	April 27, 2013 (US); June 14, 2013 (AUS)
132	30	"The God of Venus: Quetzalcoatl (Part 2)"; Transliteration: "Nemeshisu no kodō" (Japanese: ネメシスの鼓動)	October 23, 2011	April 27, 2013 (US); June 14, 2013 (AUS)
133	31	"The God of Destruction's Revival! (Part 1)"; Transliteration: "Hakaishin, fukkatsu!?" (Japanese: 破壊神、復活！？)	October 30, 2011	May 4, 2013 (US); June 18, 2013 (AUS)
134	32	"The God of Destruction's Revival! (Part 2)"; Transliteration: "Sajitario no ichigeki" (Japanese: サジタリオの一撃)	November 6, 2011	May 4, 2013 (US); June 18, 2013 (AUS)
135	33	"The Child of Nemesis (Part 1)"; Transliteration: "Nemeshisu no mōshigo" (Japanese: 黒き太陽（ネメシス）の申し子)	November 13, 2011	May 11, 2013 (US); June 19, 2013 (AUS)
136	34	"The Child of Nemesis (Part 2)"; Transliteration: "Hadesu no jubaku" (Japanese: ハデスの呪縛)	November 20, 2011	May 11, 2013 (US); June 19, 2013 (AUS)
137	35	"Four Hearts (Part 1)"; Transliteration: "Yottsu no Tamashii" (Japanese: 四つの心)	November 27, 2011	May 18, 2013 (US); June 20, 2013 (AUS)
138	36	"Four Hearts (Part 2)"; Transliteration: "Ginga Bāsasu Kurisu" (Japanese: 銀河VSクリス)	December 4, 2011	May 18, 2013 (US); June 20, 2013 (AUS)
139	37	"Come Together, Legendary Bladers! (Part 1)"; Transliteration: "Shūketsu! Rejiendo Burēdā" (Japanese: 集結!レジェンドブレーダー)	December 11, 2011	May 25, 2013 (US); June 21, 2013 (AUS)
140	38	"Come Together, Legendary Bladers! (Part 2)"; Transliteration: "Zeusu no kekkai" (Japanese: ゼウスの結界)	December 18, 2011	May 25, 2013 (US); June 21, 2013 (AUS)
141	39	"Diablo Nemesis (Part 1)"; Transliteration: "Deiaburo Nemeshisu" (Japanese: ディアブロネメシス)	December 25, 2011	June 1, 2013 (US); June 25, 2013 (AUS)
142	40	"Diablo Nemesis (Part 2)"; Transliteration: "Hoshi no kizuna" (Japanese: 星の絆)	January 8, 2012	June 1, 2013 (US); June 25, 2013 (AUS)
143	41	"To The Final Battle Ground (Part 1)"; Transliteration: "Kessen no chi e" (Japanese: 決戦の地へ)	January 15, 2012	June 8, 2013 (US); June 26, 2013 (AUS)
144	42	"To The Final Battle Ground (Part 2)"; Transliteration: "Michibikareshi Sadame" (Japanese: 導かれし運命（さだめ）)	January 22, 2012	June 8, 2013 (US); June 26, 2013 (AUS)
145	43	"The Lost Kingdom (Part 1)"; Transliteration: "Ushinawareta ōkoku" (Japanese: 失われた王国)	January 29, 2012	June 15, 2013 (US); June 27, 2013 (AUS)
146	44	"The Lost Kingdom (Part 2)"; Transliteration: "Nemeshisu Bāsasu Erudorago" (Japanese: 破壊神(ネメシス)VS竜皇(エルドラゴ))	February 5, 2012	June 15, 2013 (US); June 27, 2013 (AUS)
147	45	"The Missing Star of the Four Seasons (Part 1)"; Transliteration: "Kaketa shiki no seiza" (Japanese: 欠けた四季の星座)	February 12, 2012	June 22, 2013 (US); June 28, 2013 (AUS)
148	46	"The Missing Star of the Four Seasons (Part 2)"; Transliteration: "Tsugareshi hikari" (Japanese: 継がれし光)	February 19, 2012	June 22, 2013 (US); June 28, 2013 (AUS)
149	47	"Flash Sagittario (Part 1)"; Transliteration: "Furashu Sajitario" (Japanese: フラッシュサジタリオ)	February 26, 2012	June 29, 2013 (US); July 2, 2013 (AUS)
150	48	"Flash Sagittario (Part 2)"; Transliteration: "Shuunen no Hissatsu Tengi" (Japanese: 執念の必殺転技)	March 4, 2012	June 29, 2013 (US); July 2, 2013 (AUS)
151	49	"Hades' Persistence (Part 1)"; Transliteration: "Hadesu no shūnen" (Japanese: ハデスの執念)	March 11, 2012	July 6, 2013 (US); July 3, 2013 (AUS)
152	50	"Hades' Persistence (Part 2)"; Transliteration: "Rasuto Batoru!" (Japanese: ラストバトル！)	March 18, 2012	July 6, 2013 (US); July 3, 2013 (AUS)
153	51	"A Ray of Hope (Part 1)"; Transliteration: "Kibō no hikari" (Japanese: 希望の光)	March 25, 2012	July 13, 2013 (US); July 4, 2013 (AUS)
154	52	"A Ray of Hope (Part 2)"; Transliteration: "Mirai he!" (Japanese: 未来へ！)	April 1, 2012	July 13, 2013 (US); July 4, 2013 (AUS)

=== Beyblade: Shogun Steel (2012) ===
No. overall	No. in season	Title	Original release date	English air date
155	1	"A New Age Arrives (Part 1)"; Transliteration: "Shin jidai tōrai!" (Japanese: 新時代到来！)	April 8, 2012	August 17, 2013 (U.S.) & (CAN)
156	2	"A New Age Arrives! (Part 2)"; Transliteration: "ZeroG batoru!" (Japanese: ZeroGバトル!)	April 15, 2012	August 17, 2013 (U.S.); March 5, 2016 (CAN)
157	3	"Defeat Pirate Orochi! (Part 1)"; Transliteration: "Jigoku no tokkun" (Japanese: 地獄の特訓)	April 22, 2012	August 17, 2013 (U.S.); March 6, 2016 (CAN)
158	4	"Defeat Pirate Orochi! (Part 2)"; Transliteration: "Taose! Pairētsu Orojya!" (Japanese: 倒せ!パイレーツオロジャ!)	April 29, 2012	August 17, 2013 (U.S.); March 7, 2016 (CAN)
159	5	"The Blazing Special Move (Part 1)"; Transliteration: "Taiketsu! Ribenji Macchi" (Japanese: 対決！リベンジマッチ)	May 6, 2012	August 24, 2013 (U.S.); March 8, 2016 (CAN)
160	6	"The Blazing Special Move (Part 2)"; Transliteration: "Honō no hissatsu tengi" (Japanese: 炎の必殺転技)	May 13, 2012	August 24, 2013 (U.S.); March 9, 2016 (CAN)
161	7	"The Extraordinary Synchrome! (Part 1)"; Transliteration: "Rivaizā no chōsen" (Japanese: リヴァイザーの挑戦！)	May 20, 2012	August 31, 2013 (U.S.); March 10, 2016 (CAN)
162	8	"The Extraordinary Synchrome! (Part 2)"; Transliteration: "Kyōi no shinkurōmu!" (Japanese: 驚異のシンクローム！)	May 27, 2012	August 31, 2013 (U.S.); March 11, 2016 (CAN)
163	9	"The Strength of a Bond (Part 1)"; Transliteration: "Kurenai no charenjā" (Japanese: 紅のチャレンジャー)	June 3, 2012	September 7, 2013 (U.S.); March 12, 2016 (CAN)
164	10	"The Strength of a Bond (Part 2)"; Transliteration: "Shasai no pawā" (Japanese: 絆の力)	June 10, 2012	September 7, 2013 (U.S.)
165	11	"Explode, Phantom Fire Shot! (Part 1)"; Transliteration: "Maiori shitaka" (Japanese: 舞い降りし鷹)	June 17, 2012	September 14, 2013 (U.S.)
166	12	"Explode, Phantom Fire Shot! (Part 2)"; Transliteration: "Sakuretsu! Mugen Hiryūgeki" (Japanese: 炸裂！無幻火流撃)	June 24, 2012	September 14, 2013 (U.S.)
167	13	"Kraken Attacks (Part 1)"; Transliteration: "Kyōfu! Manatsu no bīchi" (Japanese: 恐怖！真夏のビーチ)	July 1, 2012	September 21, 2013 (U.S.)
168	14	"Kraken Attacks (Part 2)"; Transliteration: "Kirāken raishū" (Japanese: キラーケン来襲!)	July 8, 2012	September 21, 2013 (U.S.)
169	15	"The Jet Black Dragon (Part 1)"; Transliteration: "Shūgeki! Nazo no Burēdā" (Japanese: 襲撃！謎のブレーダー)	July 15, 2012	September 28, 2013 (U.S.)
170	16	"The Jet Black Dragon (Part 2)"; Transliteration: "Shikkoku no Doragon" (Japanese: 漆黒のドラゴン)	July 22, 2012	September 28, 2013 (U.S.)
171	17	"Clash! Zyro VS Sakyo (Part 1)"; Transliteration: "Gāgoiru no wana" (Japanese: ガーゴイルの罠)	July 29, 2012	October 5, 2013 (U.S.)
172	18	"Clash! Zyro VS Sakyo (Part 2)"; Transliteration: "Gekitotsu! Zyro VS Sakyō" (Japanese: 激突!ゼロVS左京)	July 29, 2012	October 5, 2013 (U.S.)
173	19	"The Ironclad Golem (Part 1)"; Transliteration: "Difensu saikyō no otoko" (Japanese: ディフェンス最強の男)	August 12, 2012	October 12, 2013 (U.S.)
174	20	"The Ironclad Golem (Part 2)"; Transliteration: "Tapeiki no Goreimu" (Japanese: 鉄壁のゴレイム)	August 19, 2012	October 12, 2013 (U.S.)
175	21	"A Heated Battle of Friendship (Part 1)"; Transliteration: "Atsuki yūjō no batoru" (Japanese: 熱き友情の特訓(バトル))	August 26, 2012	October 19, 2013 (U.S.)
176	22	"A Heated Battle of Friendship (Part 2)"; Transliteration: "Unare! Orojya Rivaizā" (Japanese: 唸れ!オロジャリヴァイザー)	September 2, 2012	October 19, 2013 (U.S.)
177	23	"The Ruthless Behemoth (Part 1)"; Transliteration: "Teppeki no bōgyo o uchiyabure" (Japanese: 鉄壁の防御を打ち破れ)	September 9, 2012	October 26, 2013 (U.S.)
178	24	"The Ruthless Behemoth (Part 2)"; Transliteration: "Hijō no Begiradosu" (Japanese: 非情のベギラドス)	September 16, 2012	October 26, 2013 (U.S.)
176	25	"A Fierce Synchrome Battle (Part 1)"; Transliteration: "Kachitore! chōsenken" (Japanese: 勝ち取れ！挑戦権)	September 23, 2012	November 2, 2013
180	26	"A Fierce Synchrome Battle (Part 2)"; Transliteration: "Gekitō! Shinkurōmubatoru" (Japanese: 激闘！シンクロームバトル)	September 30, 2012	November 2, 2013
181	27	"Neo Battle Bladers (Part 1)"; Transliteration: "Aku no idenshi" (Japanese: 悪の遺伝子)	October 7, 2012	November 9, 2013
182	28	"Neo Battle Bladers (Part 2)"; Transliteration: "Neo Batoru Burēdāzu" (Japanese: ネオ・バトルブレーダーズ)	October 14, 2012	November 9, 2013
183	29	"The Best 8 Decided! (Part 1)"; Transliteration: "DNA Hōimō" (Japanese: DNA包囲網)	October 21, 2012	November 16, 2013
184	30	"The Best 8 Decided! (Part 2)"; Transliteration: "Kettei! Besuto Eito" (Japanese: 決定!ベスト8)	October 28, 2012	November 16, 2013
185	31	"Get Pumped For The Finals! (Part 1)"; Transliteration: "Moero! Kesshō Taikai" (Japanese: 燃えろ!決勝大会)	November 4, 2012	November 16, 2013
186	32	"Get Pumped For The Finals! (Part 2)"; Transliteration: "Nekketsu! Zero VS Takanosuke" (Japanese: 熱血!ゼロVS鷹ノ助)	November 11, 2012	November 16, 2013
187	33	"A Fated Showdown Between Rivals (Part 1)"; Transliteration: "Tomo tono chikai" (Japanese: 友との誓い)	November 17, 2012	November 16, 2013
188	34	"A Fated Showdown Between Rivals (Part 2)"; Transliteration: "Shukumei no Raibaru Taiketsu" (Japanese: 宿命のライバル対決)	November 16, 2012	November 16, 2013
189	35	"The Ultimate Emperor of Destruction: Bahamoote (Part 1)"; Transliteration: "Kyūkyoku hakai kō Bahamudia" (Japanese: 究極破壊皇バハムディア)	December 2, 2012	November 16, 2013
190	36	"The Ultimate Emperor of Destruction: Bahamoote (Part 2)"; Transliteration: "Takusareta omoi" (Japanese: 託された想い)	December 9, 2012	November 16, 2013
191	37	"A Spirit-filled Attack! (Part 1)"; Transliteration: "Sōzetsu!! Fainaru Macchi" (Japanese: 壮絶!ファイナルマッチ)	December 16, 2012	November 16, 2013
192	38	"A Spirit-filled Attack! (Part 2)"; Transliteration: "Kokoro no ichigeki" (Japanese: 心の一撃)	December 23, 2012	November 16, 2013
193	39	"A New Fight"; Transliteration: "Aratanaru tatakai" (Japanese: 新たなる戦い)	August 28, 2013 (DVD)	November 23, 2013
194	40	"The Legend and the Evil Combine"; Transliteration: "Densetsu to akuma no yūgō" (Japanese: 伝説と悪魔の融合)	August 28, 2013 (DVD)	November 30, 2013
195	41	"Doji's Stronghold"; Transliteration: "Daidōji no yōsai" (Japanese: 大道寺の要塞)	August 28, 2013 (DVD)	December 7, 2013
196	42	"Entering the Trap"; Transliteration: "Machiukeru wana" (Japanese: 待ち受ける罠)	August 28, 2013 (DVD)	January 4, 2014
197	43	"Byakko's Roar"; Transliteration: "Byakko no otakebi" (Japanese: 白虎の雄叫び)	September 25, 2013 (DVD)	January 11, 2014
198	44	"The All-out Mid-air Battle!"; Transliteration: "Kesshi no kūchū Batoru" (Japanese: 決死の空中バトル)	September 25, 2013 (DVD)	January 18, 2014
199	45	"The Bridge to the Future"; Transliteration: "Mirai he no kakehashi" (Japanese: 未来への架け橋)	September 25, 2013 (DVD)	January 25, 2014

== DVD releases ==
=== Region 1 (North America) ===
Beyblade: Fusion
Volume	Date	Discs	Episodes	Cover
Volume 1		1	1–7	
Volume 2	January 25, 2011	1	8–14	
Volume 3	March 1, 2011	1	15–21	
Volume 4	August 23, 2011	1	22–28	

=== Region 2 (Japan) ===
The DVD releases of 4D and Zero-G combined two shorter-length episodes into single half-hour episodes similar to the international version of the show.

Metal Fight Beyblade
Volume	Date	Discs	Episodes	Cover
Volume 1	July 15, 2009	1	1–4	Ginga; Kyouya
Volume 2	August 12, 2009	1	5–8	Kenta; Benkei; Madoka
Volume 3	September 9, 2009	1	9–12	Ginga; Doji
Volume 4	October 14, 2009	1	13–16	Ginga; Ryuga
Volume 5	November 11, 2009	1	17–20	Kenta; Hyouma; Hokuto
Volume 6	December 9, 2009	1	21–23	Ginga; Yu

Battle Bladers
Volume	Date	Discs	Episodes	Cover
Volume 1	January 13, 2010	1	24–27	Ginga; Kenta; Benkei; Kyouya; Hikaru; Hyouma; Yuu; Tsubasa
Volume 2	February 10, 2010	1	28–31	Ginga; Tsubasa
Volume 3	March 10, 2010	1	32–35	Ginga; Phoenix
Volume 4	April 14, 2010	1	36–39	Benkei; Kyoya
Volume 5	May 12, 2010	1	40–43	Doji; Yu
Volume 6	June 9, 2010	1	44–47	Kenta; Mizuchi
Volume 7	July 14, 2010	1	48–51	Ginga; Ryuga

Metal Fight Beyblade Baku (Rental only)
Volume	Date	Discs	Episodes	Cover
Volume 1	August 11, 2010	1	52–55	
Volume 2	September 8, 2010	1	56–59	
Volume 3	October 13, 2010	1	60–63	
Volume 4	November 10, 2010	1	64–67	
Volume 5	December 8, 2010	1	68–71	
Volume 6	January 12, 2011	1	72–75	
Volume 7	February 9, 2011	1	76–79	
Volume 8	March 9, 2011	1	80–83	
Volume 9	April 13, 2011	1	84–87	
Volume 10	May 11, 2011	1	88–91	
Volume 11	June 8, 2011	1	92–95	
Volume 12	July 13, 2011	1	96–99	
Volume 13	August 10, 2011	1	100–102	

Metal Fight Beyblade 4D (Rental only)
Volume	Date	Discs	Episodes	Cover
Volume 1	October 26, 2011	1	103–104	
Volume 2	October 26, 2011	1	105–106	
Volume 3	November 30, 2011	1	107–108	
Volume 4	November 30, 2011	1	109–110	
Volume 5	December 21, 2011	1	111–112	
Volume 6	December 21, 2011	1	113–114	
Volume 7	January 25, 2012	1	115–116	
Volume 8	January 25, 2012	1	117–118	
Volume 9	February 29, 2012	1	119–120	
Volume 10	February 29, 2012	1	121–122	
Volume 11	March 28, 2012	1	123–124	
Volume 12	March 28, 2012	1	125–126	
Volume 13	April 25, 2012	1	127–128	
Volume 14	May 30, 2012	1	129–132	
Volume 15	June 27, 2012	1	133–136	
Volume 16	July 25, 2012	1	137–140	
Volume 17	August 29, 2012	1	141–144	
Volume 18	August 29, 2012	1	145–148	
Volume 19	October 31, 2012	1	149–152	

Metal Fight Beyblade Zero-G
Volume	Date	Discs	Episodes	Cover
Volume 1	March 27, 2013	1	155–162	
Volume 2	April 24, 2013	1	163–170	
Volume 3	May 29, 2013	1	171–178	
Volume 4	June 26, 2013	1	179–186	
Volume 5	July 31, 2013	1	187–192	
Volume 6	August 28, 2013	1	193–196	
Volume 7	September 25, 2013	1	197–199	

Metal Fight Beyblade Movies
Volume	Date	Discs	Episodes	Cover
Metal Fight Beyblade VS The Sun: Sol Blaze, the Scorching Hot Invader	February 18, 2011	1	Movie	
