= List of Beyblade: Metal Fusion chapters =

The chapters of the Metal Fight Beyblade manga are written and illustrated by Takafumi Adachi. In Japan, they have been published in Shogakukan's Monthly CoroCoro comics since September 2008. The plot follows the adventures of Ginga Hagane, a beyblader who is searching for his hidden past. He eventually meets up with a boy named Kenta Yumiya, and the two become fast friends. Kyouya Tategami, and Benkei from the Face Hunters become good guys and aid Ginga on his quest to defeat the evil Dark Nebula organization.

An airing anime adaptation, produced by Tatsunoko Pro and Synergy SP, co-produced by Nelvana premiered on TV Tokyo on April 5, 2009.

Since Metal Fight Beyblade's debut, thirty six chapters have been released in Japan so far. In the Monthly CoroCoro comics, the chapters do not have names, but rather an arc name and chapter number instead. The chapter names are only in the shinsōban manga volumes.

The individual chapters are collected by Shogakukan in a series of shinshōbon volumes. The first volume was released on March 27, 2009. The latest volume is eight, released on April 27, 2010.

The English-language version is being released in Singapore by Chuang Yi Publishing. The first English language volume was released on July 20, 2010 The latest English language volume was released on March 8, 2011.

The anime version of Metal Fight Beyblade's plot is written differently than in the manga. One notable difference is that in the manga, the characters Beys transform for its upgrade, while in the anime, they just switch parts or get an entirely new Bey. Another notable difference is that in the manga, the characters started off with the Metal System,(4-piece top) while in the anime they started with the Hybrid Wheel System (5-piece top). Some parts of the story are different in the anime version than in the manga, but overall the plot is the same.

== Volume list ==
No.	Title	Original release date	English release date
1	Metal Fight Beyblade 1	March 27, 2009; 9-78-409140757-3	July 20, 2010; 9789814306898
01. "Pegasus Has Landed!" (舞い降りた天馬(ペガシス)！, "Maiorita Pegashisu!"); 02. "Leone's Roar!" (獅子(レオーネ)の雄叫び！, "Reōne no otakebi!"); 03. "The Forbidden Beyblade, L-Drago!" (禁断のベイ・エルドラゴ！！, "Kindan no Bei: Eru-Dorago!!"); 04. "A Heated Battle! Gingka VS Ryuga!" (激突！ 銀河VS竜牙！！, "Gekitotsu! Ginga VS Ryūga!!"); 00. "Metal Fight Beyblade" (メタルファイト ベイブレード超予告, "Metaru Faito Beiburēdo chō yokoku")
Kenta is a young Blader at the mercy of the Face Hunter Gang, who preys on weak Bladers to steal their Beyblades! That is, until the appearance of Ginga and his Beyblade, Pegasis! As Kenta befriends Ginga, he learns about the secrets to Beyblade and more about his mentor… including Ginga's dark part involving the evil organization Dark Nebula and the forbidden Beyblade, L-Drago!
2	Metal Fight Beyblade 2	June 26, 2009; 9784091408204	October 19, 2010; 9789814323086
05. "Get Up, Gingka!" (立ち上がれ銀河！, "Tachiagare Ginga!"); 06. "Revive, Pegasus!" (よみがえれ天馬(ペガシス)で！, "Yomigaere Pegashisu de!"); 07. "Pegasus Reborn!" (天馬(ペガシス)復活！, "Pegashisu fukkatsu!"); 08. "'Battle Bladers' Unveiled!" (開幕！ バトルブレーダーズ, "Kaimaku! Batoru Burēdāzu"); 09. "The Real Battle Begins" (本戦スタート！, "Honsen sutāto!")
Ginga and his arch nemesis Ryuga clash in battle, but Ryuga's L-Drago crushes Pegasis! How will Ginga avenge his father now? Ginga and friends soon learn about Battle Bladers Tournament taking place in three months' time, and Ginga's determined to get his rematch no matter what!
3	Metal Fight Beyblade 3	November 27, 2009; 9784091408570	December 21, 2010; 9789814323574
10. "Dragon Emperor Evolution!!" (竜皇超進化!!, "Ryūō chō-shinka!!"); 11. "The L-Drago Horror!!" (恐怖のL(ライトニング)·エルドラゴ!!, "kyōfu no Raitoningu Eru-Dorago!!"); 12. "The Elusive Pisces!!" (変幻自在のパイシーズ!!, "Hen maboroshi jizai no Paishīzu!!"); 13. "Transformation Technique - Annihilation!!" (合体転技·全滅双撃(アニヒレーションアタック)!!, "Gattai Tengi: Anihirēshon Atakku!!"); 14. "A Battle to the Death!!" (死闘決着!!, "Shitō ketchaku!!")
The quarter-semifinals of the Battle Bladers tournament has begun, and Ginga and Kyoya are paired up to battle two of Ryuga's most powerful subordinates, Tsubasa and Yu! What deadly move will the duo unleash on our heroes? Will their Beyblades withstand the enemy's onslaught?!
4	Metal Fight Beyblade 4	March 26, 2010; 9784091410351	March 8, 2011; 9789814323888
15. "The Ultimate Dragon Awakes!!" (極龍覚醒！！, "Kyokuryū kakusei!!"); 16. "Ultimate Special Move: Galaxy Nova!!" (究極必殺転技 銀河新星(ギャラクシーノヴァ)！！, "Kyūkyoku hissatsu tengi: Gyarakushī Novā!!"); 17. "Winner of the Semi-Finals!!" (準決勝決着！！, "Junkesshō ketchaku!!"); 18. "Final Match - Gingka VS Ryuga!!" (最終決戦、銀河VS竜牙, "Saishūkessen Ginga VS Ryūga"); 19. "The Dragon Emperor Goes Berserk!!" (竜皇暴走！！, "Ryūō bōsō!!"); SP. "Sora's Side Story - The Birth of Cyber Pegasus!" (暁 宇宙外伝 爆誕！ サイバーペガシス, "Akatsuki Sora Gaiden Bakutan! Saibā Pegashisu")
It's the Battle Bladers semi-finals, and Kyoya is up against Ryuga!! But Leone's intense fight with L-Drago causes the dragon to power-up yet again, and Ginga can only watch as his friend is buried alive! Can Pegasis stand up to L-Drago's Ultimate form when others have failed?
5	Metal Fight Beyblade 5	June 28, 2010; 9784091410665	September 5, 2011; 9789814341318
20. "Stand up, Ginga!!" (立ち上がれ銀河！！, "Tachiagare Ginga!!"); 21. "A tough new enemy, landing in Japan!!" (新たな強敵、日本上陸！！, "Arata na kyōteki, nihon jōriku!!"); 22. "Opening! Big Bang Bladers" (開幕！ビッグバンブレーダーズ, "Kaimaku! Biggu Ban Burēdāzu"); 23. "Ginga vs The Army of Darkness!! Another tale of fierce fighting" (銀河vs闇の軍団！！もう一つの激闘物語, "Ginga vs yami no gundan!! Mou hitotsu no gekitou monogatari")
In the finals of the Battle Bladers Tournament, Ryuga hits Ginga with a crushing move! In this critical moment, can Ginga pull off a miraculous comeback?! A new story begins, with the WBBA holding a worldwide tournament, the Big Bang Bladers, to determine the strongest Blader in the world! With the arrival of Masamune, a new rival and ally, Ginga sets off to take on the world!
6	Metal Fight Beyblade 6	September 28, 2010; 9784091411259	TBA
24. "Special Move, Not Acceptable!!" (必殺転技、通用せず！！, "Hissatsu tengi, tsūyō sezu!!"); 25. "Perseus: Black Despair!!" (黒き絶望 ペルセウス！！, "Kuroki zetsubō Peruseusu!! "); 26. "Euro Battle, the Perfect Conclusion!!" (ユーロ戦 完全決着！！, "Yūro-sen kanzen ketchaku!!"); SP. "Beyblade VS The Sun: Sol Blaze, the Scorching-hot Invader" (ベイブレードVS太陽 灼熱の侵略者ソルブレイズ, "Beiburēdo VS Taiyō shakunetsu no shinryakusha Soru Bureizu")
7	Metal Fight Beyblade 7	December 24, 2010; 9784091411938	TBA
27. "L-Drago's Revival!!" (エルドラゴ復活！！, "Eru-Dorago fukkatsu!!"); 28. "Ryuga Joins the Battle!!" (竜牙参戦！！, "Ryūga sansen!!"); 29. "Bey of Hell: The Hell Kerbecs" (地獄のベイ ヘルケルベクス！！, "Jigoku no Bei Heru Kerubekusu!!"); 30. "I Have to Win!! The World Battle Final" (勝つしかねぇ！！世界大戦決勝戦, "Katsu shikanē!! Sekaitaisen kesshōsen"); SP. "Clash! Ryuga VS Helios" (激突！！竜牙VSヘリオス, "Gekitotsu!! Ryūga VS Heriosu")
8	Metal Fight Beyblade 8	April 27, 2011; 9784091412379	TBA
31. "Damian's Super Start!!" (ダミアン超始動！！, "Damian chō shidō!!"); 32. "The Bey Spirit: Big Bang Pegasis!!" (心のベイ ビッグバンペガシス！！, "Tamashii no Bei Biggu Ban Pegashisu!!"); 33. "Big Bang Bladers Final Conclusion!!"" (ビッグバンブレーダーズ 最終決着！！, "Biggu Ban Burēdāzu saishū ketchaku!"); SP. "Clash!! Pegasis VS Divine Chimera" (激突！！ ペガシスVSディバインキメラ！！, "Gekitotsu!! Pegashisu VS Deibain Kimera!!"); 34. "Begin! The Earth's Strongest Decisive Battle" (開幕！ 地球最強決定戦, "Kaimaku! Chikyū saikyō ketteisen")
9	Metal Fight Beyblade 9	August 26, 2011; 9784091412997	TBA
35. "A Stormy Fierce Battle!!" (嵐の激闘！！, "Arashi no gekitō!!"); 36. "Shoot the Dragon of Destruction!!" (破壊の龍を討て！！, "Hakai no ryū o ute!!"); 37. "Clash!! The Legend Bladers"" (激突！！ 伝説ブレーダー！！, "Gekitotsu!! Rejendo Burēdā"); 38. "The Genius Blader, King, Joins In!!" (天才ブレーダー キング参戦！！, "Tensai Burēdā King sansen!!"); SP. "Brawl!! The Metabe Island One Round Beyblade Race!!" (大乱闘！！ 芽辺島一周ベイブレードレース！！, "Dairantō!! Metabe tō ishū Beiburēdo Rēsu!!")
10	Metal Fight Beyblade 10	—	TBA
39. "Against the Invincible King!!" (不敗のキングをうち破れ!!, "Fuhai no Kingu o Uchi Yabure !!"); 40. "Phantom Orion The Stealthiest Bey!!" (幻影のベイ、ファントムオリオン!!, "Genei no Bei , Fantomu Orion !!"); 41. "Pegasus, Unleash the Storm!"" (嵐を起こせ! ペガシス!!, "Arashi o Okose ! Pegashisu !!"); 42. "Here it Comes! Nemesis, the God of Destruction!!" (降臨!! 破壊神・ネメシス!!, "Kōrin !! Hakaishin Nemeshisu !!"); SP. The "Number One Blader Challenge", a Tournament for the Heroes of the Series! (開催! 歴代ブレーダーナンバーワン決定戦!!, "Kaisai ! Rekidai Burēdānanbāwan Ketteisen !!")
11	Metal Fight Beyblade 11	—	TBA
SP. "Gingka & Ryuga, the Dynamic Duo" (奇跡のタッグ 銀河と竜牙!!, "Kiseki no Taggu Ginga to Ryūga!!"); SP. "Ryuto, the Treasure Hunter" (トレジャーハンター竜斗外伝, "Torejāhantā Ryūto Gaiden"); 43. "An Ultimate Special Move for the Ultimate Battle: Cosmic Nova"" (最終決戦転技 コズミックノヴァ, "Saishū Kessen Tenwaza Kozumikku Nova"); 44. "The Ultimate Battle: Gingka vs Rago"" (最終決戦 銀河VSラゴウ!!, "Saishū Kessen Ginga VS Ragō !!"); 45. "Go Gingka: Cosmic Nova!!" (決めろ!! コズミックノヴァ, "Kimero !! Kozumikku Nova"); 46. "Gingka, Our Hero Forever!" (銀河よ、永遠に!!, "Ginga yo , Eien ni !!")

== Notes ==
- Chapter 9 from the CoroCoro magazine was split into 2 different chapters in the shinsōban of Volume 2.
- Chapter 18 from the CoroCoro magazine was split into 2 different chapters in the shinsōban of Volumes 4 and 5.
