= Animation x Paralympic =

Series of Japanese animated short films

- Animation x Paralympic: Who Is Your Hero?

アニ×パラ〜あなたのヒーローは誰ですか〜 (Ani x Para: Anata no Hīrō wa Dare desu ka?)
- Genre: Sports (Paralympic sports)
- Created by: Yoichi Takahashi
- Anime television series
- Studio: Nippon Animation; TMS Entertainment; DLE; Gallop; SynergySP
- Original network: NHK General, NHK E, NHK World
- Original run: November 10, 2017 – present
- Episodes: 18
- icon

Animation x Paralympic: Who Is Your Hero? (Japanese: アニ×パラ〜あなたのヒーローは誰ですか〜, Hepburn: Ani x Para: Anata no Hīrō wa Dare desu ka?) (abbreviated Anime x Para or Ani x Para) is a series of animated short films produced by NHK to promote the 2020 Summer Paralympics in Tokyo. Each episode features a different Paralympic sport and is produced in collaboration with well-known anime and manga creators or franchises.

On February 28, 2020, it was announced that Kyoto Animation had to cancel an episode they were working on, originally due to be aired in August 2019, as due to an arson attack they would be unable to complete it in time for the 2020 Paralympics.

== List of episodes ==
No.	Sport	Release date (Japan)	Release date (U.S.)	Collaborators
1	Football 5-a-side	November 10, 2017	September 8, 2018	Story directed by Yoichi Takahashi, creator of Captain Tsubasa; Theme song by Okamoto's
2	Para-athletics	November 10, 2017	November 10, 2018	Story by Eisaku Kubonouchi, author of Chocolat; Theme song by Sakura Fujiwara
3	Wheelchair tennis	August 25, 2018	November 11, 2018	Features real-life athlete Shingo Kunieda, four-time Paralympic medal winner; Crossover with Baby Steps; Theme song by Leo Ieiri
4	Goalball	November 17, 2018	December 9, 2018	Crossover with KochiKame: Tokyo Beat Cops; Theme song by Tokyo Ska Paradise Orchestra
5	Wheelchair rugby	December 15, 2018	January 26, 2019	Characters by Tetsuya Chiba, creator of Ashita no Joe; Theme song by Mongol800
6	Vision impaired judo	March 3, 2019	May 14, 2019	Collaboration with Katsutoshi Kawai, creator of Monkey Turn, who interviewed Junko Hirose, bronze medal winner at the Rio 2016 Paralympic Games; Theme song by miwa
7	Paracycling	July 20, 2019	August 19, 2019	Features real-life athlete Shota Kawamoto; Crossover with Yowamushi Pedal; Theme song by 04 Limited Sazabys
8	Para-badminton	November 12, 2019	January 4, 2020	Collaboration with Kōji Seo, creator of Suzuka; Theme song by Kaela Kimura
9	Boccia	March 30, 2020	May 25, 2020	Features real-life athlete Takayuki Hirose, member of the silver medal winning team at the Rio 2016 Paralympic Games; Crossover with Hotaru no Hikari; Theme song by Mao Abe
10	Vision impaired marathon	March 31, 2020	June 1, 2020	Collaboration with Mashiro Hi, a manga about vision impaired marathon; Theme song by LiSA
11	Wheelchair basketball	October 18, 2020	November 3, 2020	Crossover with Dear Boys: Act 4; Theme song by Daichi Miura
12	Para table tennis	April 25, 2021	June 27, 2021	Features real-life athlete Iwabuchi Koyo, competitor at the Rio 2016 Paralympic Games; Collaboration with Yoshino Mariko and Miyao Kazutaka, author and illustrator respectively of Team Futari; Theme song composed by Tsunku and sung by Yokoyama Daisuke and the NHK Tokyo Children's Chorus
13	Para-alpine skiing	February 20, 2022		Features Momo Minamikawa, character based on an interview with real-life athlete Momoka Muraoka; Character Design- Hisashi Eguchi; Theme song- Awesome City Club "On Your Mark"
14	Para-Snowboard	February 20, 2022		Features Mayama, character based on an interview with real-life athlete Keiji Okamoto; Character design- Kazuhiko Shimamoto; Theme song- WurtS "SPACESHIP"
15	Para-volleyball	August 22, 2022		Collaboration with Harigane Service by Tatsuya Ara; Theme song by Hatsune Miku and dance group CONDENSE
16	Paracanoe	March 12, 2023		Collaboration with Kimi to Kogu - Nagatoro Kōkō Canoe-bu by Ayano Takeda; Theme song- otoha "If no Mermaid".
17	Para-archery	February 27, 2024		Features real-life athlete Aiko Okazaki, competitor at the Tokyo 2020 Paralympic Games; Collaboration with Ushio & Tora by Kazuhiro Fujita; Theme song- Burnout Syndromes "Amateras".
18	Goalball	March 22, 2024		Collaboration with Welcome to Demon School! Iruma-kun; Theme song- Da Pump "Unstoppable".
