= Magic Repo Man =

Japanese web novel series

- Magic Repo Man: Dumped by My Party, I'll Cash In With a Cute Support Fairy to Become the Strongest!
- First tankōbon volume cover of the manga adaptation

貸した魔力は【リボ払い】で強制徴収 ～用済みとパーティー追放された俺は、可愛いサポート妖精と一緒に取り立てた魔力を運用して最強を目指す。～ (Kashita Maryoku wa "Ribo-barai" de Kyōsei Chōshū: Yōzumi to Pātī Tsuihō Sareta Ore wa, Kawaii Sapōto Yōsei to Issho ni Toritaketa Maryoku o Unyō Shite Saikyō o Mezashimasu)
- Genre: Fantasy
- Novel series
- Written by: Masakichi
- Published by: Shōsetsuka ni Narō (June 28, 2021—February 1, 2025); Kakuyomu (January 8, 2022—present)
- Original run: June 28, 2021 – present
- Manga
- Written by: Masakichi
- Illustrated by: Shingō Iijima
- Published by: Flex Comix
- English publisher: NA: Seven Seas Entertainment
- Imprint: Meteor Comics
- Magazine: Comic Arc; Comic Meteor
- Original run: April 26, 2023 – present
- Volumes: 6
- Anime television series
- Directed by: Takahiro Tamano
- Written by: Ryūsuke Mori
- Music by: Kow Otani
- Studio: SynergySP
- Licensed by: Crunchyroll: SEA: Muse Communication
- Original network: ANN (TV Asahi), BS Asahi
- Original run: October 4, 2026 – present
- Episodes: 4
- icon

Magic Repo Man: Dumped by My Party, I'll Cash In With a Cute Support Fairy to Become the Strongest! (Note: Japanese: 貸した魔力は【リボ払い】で強制徴収 ～用済みとパーティー追放された俺は、可愛いサポート妖精と一緒に取り立てた魔力を運用して最強を目指す。～, Hepburn: Kashita Maryoku wa "Ribo-barai" de Kyōsei Chōshū: Yōzumi to Pātī Tsuihō Sareta Ore wa, Kawaii Sapōto Yōsei to Issho ni Toritaketa Maryoku o Unyō Shite Saikyō o Mezashimasu), also known by the alternative English title Unlimited Vault: The Magic They Borrowed Will Be Their Downfall, is a Japanese web novel series written by Masakichi. It was originally posted on the online publishing platform Shōsetsuka ni Narō beginning in June 2021, with it also being posted to Kadokawa's Kakuyomu service from January 2022. A manga adaptation illustrated by Shingō Iijima began serialization under Flex Comix and BookLive's Comic Arc label and on Flex Comix's Comic Meteor service in April 2023, and has been compiled into six volumes as of September 2026. An anime television series adaptation produced by SynergySP premiered in October 2026.

== Plot ==
The series follows Lent, an adventurer who was a member of a traveling party known as the Skypiercers. His unique ability allows him to loan out his own MP to his partymates and others. However, his lack of strength, in contrast to others' increasing skill, result in him being forced to leave the Skypiercers. Shortly after, he encounters a cute fairy who offers to help him in his new life. Seeking revenge, and feeling betrayed by his former party questioning his usefulness, Lent decides to get back the magic he loaned out.

== Characters ==
Lent (レント, Rento)
Voiced by: Kantarō Hayashi (voice comic), Reiji Kawashima (anime)
Lent was part of the "Sky Cleaving Sword" party with his 2 childhood friends Guy and Misa until they grew arrogant and eventually kicked him out of the party. In a fit of rage, Lent demanded that they all return what they borrowed which caused his S-Rank skill to awaken into a SSS-Rank skill and decided to put his former party members in his debt as revenge. Lent also gained a skill fairy known as "Empee" who helps him develop his skill to its fullest potential. Lent eventually formed a new party with Rinka another adventurer who also possessed a SSS-Rank Skill and continued to travel and help others in need.
Empee (エムピー, Emupī)
Voiced by: Tsugumi Sakuragi (voice comic), Emiri Katō (anime)
Empee is a skill fairy who appeared before Lent after his skill awakened into a SSS-Rank Skill, she helped him get back at his former party members and helps him develop his skill to its true potential. Although Empee does care for Lent, she clearly has ulterior motives and often orchestrates events for Lent to grow stronger.
Linka (リンカ, Rinka)
Voiced by: Chika Ayamori (voice comic), Risae Matsuda (anime)
Rinka is an adventurer who like Lent was kicked out of her party after being used as bait for a powerful monster. Rinka while possessing a SSS-Rank Skill was unable to draw on its true power and was seen as useless, because of this Rinka was kicked out of every party she has ever been in. But after meeting Lent, she learned how to use her skill more efficiently and decided to form a party together. Rinka is hinted to have feelings for Lent and is overprotective of him, due to his former party members coming after him repeatedly.
Anger (アンガー, Angā)
Guy (ガイ, Gai)
Voiced by: Akira Yamamoto (voice comic), Daiki Hamano (anime)
Guy was Lent's former party leader who eventually kicked him out after abusing his skill to loan his MP to others as he along with his 2 other party members Misa and Elle found bracelets that restored their MP by 1000 everyday. However, Guy was enraged to learn that Lent had placed a curse on all 3 of them that stole all their MP to pay back the 2.7 Million MP that they borrowed from Lent over the past few years. Guy along with Misa and Elle failed to defeat Lent as he managed to grow stronger and ended up strengthening the curse to take more MP from them. In the end, the "Sky Cleaving Sword" disbanded after the 3 of them had a dispute over their debt.
Misa (ミサ)
Voiced by: Natsuko Hara (voice comic), Akira Sekine (anime)
Misa was Lent's former childhood friend and party member from the "Sky Cleaving Sword". In the past, she had feelings for Lent but as time passed Misa grew arrogant and gained feelings for Guy instead. After Misa along with Guy and Elle kicked Lent out of the party, she was the first to notice that their MP was disappearing and realized that Lent had placed a curse on them to take back the MP that they borrowed and never repaid. After Lent defeated them in battle, Misa left the party and attempted to seduce him into removing her debt to him. But because Misa was unable to meet the deadline to payback a portion of the 2.7 Million MP that she borrowed from Lent, her skills were converted into MP instead, leaving her powerless. In the end, Misa ended up suffering from a potion overdose as she overly relied on them after Lent placed the curse on her, which left her a shell of her former self.
Elle (エル, Eru)
Voiced by: Kaede Kogaya (voice comic), Yū Kobayashi (anime)
Elle is an Elf who joined the "Sky Cleaving Sword" not long after Lent, Guy, and Misa set out on their journey. But as time went on, she like Guy and Misa grew arrogant and eventually kicked Lent out of their party. But she was left horrified after Lent placed a curse on them and was the only one who refused to take MP potions as she did not like how they tasted. After they lost to Lent, Elle along with Misa decided to quit the "Sky Cleaving Sword" to try and escape their debt which led to the party's disbandment.
Roger (ロジャー, Rojā)
Voiced by: Daisuke Namikawa (anime)

== Media ==
=== Web novel ===
Masakichi originally posted the series as a web novel on the online publication platform Shōsetsuka ni Narō on June 28, 2021. They later also began posting it on Kadokawa's platform Kakuyomu on January 8, 2022. The web novel was removed from Shōsetsuka ni Narō on February 1, 2025, but remains available on Kakuyomu as of November 2025.

=== Manga ===
A manga adaptation illustrated by Shingō Iijima began serialization under Flex Comix and BookLive's Comic Arc label and on Flex Comix's Comic Meteor service on April 26, 2023. Its chapters have been compiled into six tankōbon volumes as of September 2026. The manga is licensed in English by Seven Seas Entertainment.

| No. | Original release date | Original ISBN | English release date | English ISBN |
|---|---|---|---|---|
| 1 | September 12, 2023 | 978-4-86675-307-2 | August 4, 2026 | 979-8-89863-079-9 |
| 2 | February 9, 2024 | 978-4-86675-336-2 | October 13, 2026 | 979-8-89863-080-5 |
| 3 | October 11, 2024 | 978-4-86675-380-5 | December 8, 2026 | 979-8-89863-081-2 |
| 4 | April 15, 2025 | 978-4-86675-419-2 | February 9, 2027 | 979-8-89863-680-7 |
| 5 | November 14, 2025 | 978-4-86675-465-9 | April 13, 2027 | 979-8-89863-810-8 |
| 6 | September 15, 2026 | 978-4-86675-523-6 | — | — |
| 7 | December 15, 2026 | 978-4-86675-539-7 | — | — |

=== Anime ===
An anime television series adaptation was announced on November 12, 2025. The series is produced by SynergySP and directed by Takahiro Tamano, and features scripts written by Ryūsuke Mori, character designs by Kazue Mori, and music by Kow Otani. It premiered on October 4, 2026, on the NUMAnimation programming block on TV Asahi and its affiliates. The opening theme song is "Risk rate" (リスクレート), performed by BUDDiiS, and the ending theme song is "Iremono" (いれもの; 'Vase'), performed by Kotani. Crunchyroll is streaming the series. Muse Communication licensed the series in Southeast Asia.

==== Episodes ====
| No. | Title | Directed by | Written by | Storyboard by | Original release date |
|---|---|---|---|---|---|
| 1 | "Kicked Out"; Transliteration: "Tsuihou" (Japanese: 追放) | Takahiro Tamano | Ryūsuke Mori | Takahiro Tamano | October 3, 2026 |
The adventurer Lent possesses the S-rank skill Magic Storage, which allows him to lend his large reserves of MP to strengthen others. Using his power, his party-mates swordsman Guy, mage Misa, and healer Elle, are becoming famous, wealthy adventurers. Despite Lent's vital role, over the years his former childhood friends have become arrogant, treating him with contempt and even refuse to buy him proper armour as his skill does not let him fight on the front lines. Furthermore, Lent remains stuck at E-rank because levelling up requires borrowers to repay their borrowed MP, something his party hasn't done in two years. After completing a quest, the party abruptly expels Lent, having acquired bracelets that regenerate 1,000 MP daily. When Lent begs to stay, Guy nearly strangles him to death. Abandoned and furious, Lent cries out to the heavens, demanding the return of all the MP he ever gave away. In response, Magic Storage suddenly evolves into Infinite Magic Storage, granting him massive power and a small fairy companion.
| 2 | "Contract"; Transliteration: "Keiyaku" (Japanese: 契約) | Shinji Sano | Kengo Takagi | Kazumi Nonaka & Tetsuya Watanabe | October 10, 2026 |
Empee, the mischievous support fairy tied to Lent's unique skill, reveals the Sky Piercers borrowed 2,678,087 mana points from him over five years. Due to a one-year limit, Lent can only forcibly reclaim 1,435,837 of those points. When Lent confronts them, Guy beats him up again but mockingly promises to maybe pay him back when they get rich. This verbal acknowledgment of their debt unwittingly activates Lent's Forced Collection, enabling his skill to take mana from them every day. To punish them, Empee ensures the Sky Piercers are forced onto the sadistic Revolving Payment plan. Using their own daily regeneration plus their bracelets, they can pay 11,640 points every day. However, an 8% interest charge increases their debt by 115,000 every ten days. Consequently, they pay 116,400 points every ten days; 115,000 covering the interest, and a mere 1,400 toward the actual 1,435,837 they owe. This traps them in an eternal cycle of large daily payments until old age while their debt will barely shrink in their lifetimes. Although Lent considers this cruel, Empee argues she is simply enacting his subconscious desire for vengeance. She agrees to modify the plan to be less cruel in the unlikely event the Sky Piercers offer him a genuine apology.
| 3 | "Investment"; Transliteration: "Toushi" (Japanese: 投資) | Lee Jeon Jong | Shōhei Fukuda | Tetsuya Watanabe & Takahiro Tamano | October 17, 2026 |
The Skypiercers finally notice Lent's Revolving Repayment Seal on their necks, and are shocked when their mana is depleted. Lent worries what will happen if the Skypiercers find him. Empee points out there is nothing to fear as he has the Invest skill and can make himself stronger. As killing monsters will let him do this faster, Lent decides to visit Melva City's dungeon. Empee is pleased as the two-week journey will keep him away from the Skypiercers and let him Invest in new skills. Lent begins investing to increase his usage capacity. Misa realises Lent put the Seals on them. Lent increases his usage capacity to 4700 points, comparable to an Archmage, and the new skill Magic Balance appears, which lets him withdraw points from Infinite Storage. Having spent 350,000 points, he gains the skill Purchase. Empee demonstrates Lent can now buy any skills that exist. Lent is astounded as humans are only granted one skill by God, explaining why Infinite Storage is an SSS rank skill. Lent registers at the Melva guild and begins exploring the dungeon. As he only has a dagger Lent buys the skills Short-blade, Fireball, Physical Enhancement and Heal. In the dungeon, swordswoman Linka is abused by her party.
| 4 | "Powerful Foe"; Transliteration: "Kyōteki" (Japanese: 強敵) | Joo Hyunwoo & Masakazu Amiya | Kōhei Nishimura | Masakazu Amiya & Hitoyuki Matsui | October 24, 2026 |
On the second level, Goblin Forest, Empee shows Lent that by using Magic Balance to take points out of Infinite Storage, he can keep his mana bar full and cast Fireball repeatedly, taking out an entire goblin nest. After selling their stones he receives 186,600 gold and is promoted to D rank. In case the Skypiercers ever find him, Empee advises saving 150,000 points to buy an important skill. As a reward, Empee requests points, which are a delicacy to fairies like herself. Lent gifts her 100 via a kiss. Lent sadly recalls that Misa almost gave him his first kiss, but the memory is tainted by her betrayal. Misa eventually notices they are losing far more points than what is being deducted from their debt, but cannot explain why. In an attempt to mitigate this, Misa and Elle try to seduce an old adventurer with a high MP level into joining their party. However they are rejected, as by now the whole guild has learned of the curse afflicting the Skypiercers, and are happy seeing them getting their comeuppance for their arrogance. The Skypiercers finally learn Lent moved to Melva and decide to go kill him. Lent reaches the third level, Undead Cave, where Empee teaches him to communicate telepathically. Using Detect Presence, he senses other adventurers fighting an Irregular, a powerful monster. By the time he reaches them, three adventurers are fleeing, having trapped their fourth member with the Irregular. Outraged, Lent blasts the barrier with Fireball and finds swordswoman Linka fighting a Quad Skeleton.
| 5 | "Deviate"; Transliteration: "Itsudatsu" (Japanese: 逸脱) | Lee Jeon Jong, Yu Se Hyeong & Masakazu Amiya | Kengo Takagi | Kenichi Higaki | October 31, 2026 |
Linka's sword is broken, but Lent obliterates Quad Skeleton with multiple fireballs. On the surface, the party Meteor Shower plan to completely clear the Melva dungeon; comprising swordsman Roger, mage Comet, support mage Namilia, tank Jin and spearman Fuuga. Linka's party report the appearance of the Irregular that killed Linka. The guild's remote tracking spell reveals Linka is still alive, so Meteor Shower and other adventurers volunteer to rescue her. Linka and Lent suddenly appear with the Quad Skeleton's magic stone and expose Linka's party members for her attempted murder. Roger decides to execute them but is restrained by Fuuga. Meteor Shower asks Lent to assist them with a job in two days. For their crimes, Linka's party are stripped of their adventurer licences and sentenced to life imprisonment in a labor camp. Linka reveals she has been kicked from seven parties for weakness, and wishes she could quit adventuring, but her SSS skill Asura Realm forces her to keep fighting. As his skill is essentially a support role, Lent offers to form a new party to help her. Empee reveals herself to Linka, explaining Lent can make her stronger. Feeling hopeful, Linka forms a party with Lent they name Twice Exceptional for their two unique skills.
| 6 | "Curse"; Transliteration: "Jubaku" (Japanese: 呪縛) | Han Young-hoon | Ryūsuke Mori | Hitoyuki Matsui & Takahiro Tamano | November 7, 2026 |
Lent gains the ability Auto-Charge, automatically transferring MP to Linka whenever hers runs out. Meanwhile, the Skypiercers continue using toxic MP recovery potions, unconcerned it is shortening their lifespans. They board a carriage to Melva alongside the B-rank party Twin-Head Silver Wolves: sibling swordsmen Destra and Sinistra, scout Rory, healer Celica, and mage Shannon. While the Wolves remember Lent fondly, they are unimpressed by the Skypiercers' arrogance. When High Orcs attack, the Skypiercers have no MP and are completely humiliated in battle, increasing their rage toward Lent. Meanwhile, Lent brings Linka to a blacksmith shop, where the Quad Skeleton’s sword has been reforged into a superior katana for her. Lent's childhood friend Gorou, who works at the shop, admits he initially disliked his Blacksmith skill but grew to enjoy it. He assures Linka that she will eventually appreciate her own troublesome skill. Back in the labyrinth, Linka reveals her First Strike ability, a physical enhancement that remains active until her MP runs out. Empee points out Auto-Charge allows First Strike to stay active indefinitely, enabling Linka to single-handedly fight a goblin army. Lent is worried by her Asura Realm skill, which triggers a frightening level of bloodlust in her. His concern proves justified when, after slaughtering the goblins, Linka mindlessly attacks Lent.
| 7 | "Reunion"; Transliteration: "Saikai" (Japanese: 再会) | Zhu Xiaoyue & Takahiro Tamano | Shōhei Fukuda | Hitoyuki Matsui & Masakazu Amiya | November 14, 2026 |
Fortunately, Linka quickly awakens and apologises. Linka is thrilled her maximum MP grew from 10 points to 14 with Lent's help. Empee announces Linka borrowed 616 points with 10% interest. Linka promises to pay it back as fast as she can, so Empee kindly sets no deadline. Meteor Shower invite Lent to dinner, which Linka is too nervous to attend. Roger informs Lent of the recent trouble from the Skypiercers. Namilia recalls meeting Lent after quitting her previous party, and his earnestness in making his allies stronger made her realise she was the problem in her previous party because of her selfishness, helping her grow up. Roger reveals their eventual goal is to clear Melva Labyrinth, though they are unsure how many floors are down there. Namilia regrets they cannot ask Lent to join Meteor Shower now he has a party of his own. Lent remembers he has a job request for them. Empee sees the Skypiercers arrive in Melva and mysteriously comments that "Yggdrasil knows where his debtors are". Linka is promoted to E rank. The Skypiercers locate and accuse Lent of stealing their MP. No longer scared of them, Lent reminds them they are paying back what they owe. Roger interrupts and mischievously suggests they duel Lent to settle the matter officially.
| 8 | "Duel"; Transliteration: "Kettō" (Japanese: 決闘) | Shinji Sano | Kōhei Nishimura | Takahiro Tamano | November 21, 2026 |
It is revealed Lent hired Meteor Shower to trick the Skypiercers into the duel. Empee advises Lent to raise their interest rate from 8% to 10% if they lose. Their current 116,400-point repayment barely reduces the debt, whereas a 10% rate would be 143,600 points. Unable to pay that much, their debt would grow by 27,200 points every ten days instead of shrinking. Before the duel, Guy demands debt cancellation if they win, and Lent counters with the interest rise if they lose. Only Misa grasps what "interest rise" means while Guy and Elle remain confused. Seeing Linka's worry, Empee reassures her Lent's new skills make losing impossible. Downing MP potions, the Skypiercers charge, but Lent counters with Enchant Break against Elle, Water Flow against Misa and Wind Cutter against Guy. Their ultimate Skyblaze Hellfire Vortex Breaker fails to impress Lent, who slams Guy into a wall, slaps Misa, and sets Elle on fire. Empee reveals the 150,000-point skill she wanted for Lent is Creditor Protection, which negates damage from people in his debt up to the amount owed, meaning the Skypiercers would have to deal 1.4 million points of damage in order to hurt him. Lent snaps Guy's mithril sword and manically threatens to sell his soul for the debt. Terrified, Guy becomes convinced Lent is a demon.

== Reception ==
The web novel was one of the winners of the Comic Scenario Award at the 10th Internet Novel Awards in 2022.
