= A Gatherer's Adventure in Isekai =

Japanese light novel series and its franchise

- First light novel volume cover, featuring (from left to right) Clayston, Bee, Takeru, and Brolite

素材採取家の異世界旅行記 (Sozai Saishuka no Isekai Ryokōki)
- Genre: Isekai
- Novel series
- Written by: Masuo Kinoko
- Published by: AlphaPolis
- Original run: July 7, 2016 – present
- Light novel
- Written by: Masuo Kinoko
- Illustrated by: Senbon Umishima (1–4); Katsuki Onda (5–6); Susumu Kuroi (7–)
- Published by: AlphaPolis
- Original run: January 31, 2017 – present
- Volumes: 17
- Manga
- Written by: Masuo Kinoko
- Illustrated by: Tomozo
- Published by: AlphaPolis
- English publisher: Alpha Manga
- Original run: December 13, 2017 – present
- Volumes: 9
- Anime television series
- Directed by: Yoshinori Odaka
- Produced by: Kazuki Kanagawa; Yoshito Danno; Takahiro Kurisu; Aoi Sato; Hitoshi Sugiura; Rin
- Written by: Gigaemon Ichikawa
- Music by: Hiroshi Takaki
- Studio: Tatsunoko Production; SynergySP
- Licensed by: Crunchyroll; SA/SEA: Muse Communication
- Original network: Tokyo MX, BS11, AT-X
- Original run: October 7, 2025 – December 22, 2025
- Episodes: 12

A Gatherer's Adventure in Isekai (素材採取家の異世界旅行記, Sozai Saishuka no Isekai Ryokōki) is a Japanese light novel series written by Masuo Kinoko and illustrated by Senbon Umishima, Katsuki Onda, and Susumu Kuroi. Originally published online since July 2016, AlphaPolis has published seventeen volumes of the series since January 2017. A manga adaptation illustrated by Tomozo, began serialization online via AlphaPolis' manga website in December 2017, and has been collected in nine tankōbon volumes. The manga is published digitally in English through Alpha Manga. An anime television series adaptation produced by Tatsunoko Production and SynergySP aired from October to December 2025.

== Premise ==
Takeru is frustrated with his hectic life, wishing for a change. While watching TV after work, he suddenly wakes up in the domain of the overseer of the universe, or "god". Informed that he died, Takeru accepts being reborn on a magical planet called Madeus. It turns out that Madeus' civilizations keep collapsing due to the failures of the inhabitants, so God wishes to cause a ripple effect to stop this cycle; by introducing an outsider with new ideas and perspectives to the world.

== Characters ==
Takeru (タケル)
Voiced by: Nobunaga Shimazaki (Japanese); Chris Long (English)
A Japanese salaryman who gets sent by a mysterious god to the world of Madeus so he can help its civilizations avoid collapse. To facilitate his tasks, he is resurrected as a gatherer of resources and blessed with magic.
Bee (ビー, Bī)
Voiced by: Ayasa Itō
A child of Voldius, the ancient dragon living beneath a mountain. It had trouble hatching because its egg had been tainted by impurities in Voldius' lake, but Takeru infused it with his own magic and helped it hatch. Upon its birth, Takeru gives it the nickname "Bee" and Voldius entrusts it under Takeru's care.
Brolite (ブロライト, Buroraito)
Voiced by: Makoto Koichi
A high-elf that had embarked on a journey to find a mysterious white horse that their sister was searching for. They are left starving and unclean while traveling across the woods but Takeru helps them. They become friends and Takeru hires them as a bodyguard during his journey to the dwarf kingdom Voszraol. They are a fighter who has mastered the use of dual knives. Although initially referred to as female, it is later revealed that they are intersex and accept both "him" and "her" pronouns.
Clayston (クレイストン, Kureisuton)
Voiced by: Toshiyuki Morikawa
A Lizardman and a veteran from the adventurers' guild at Belkaim City. He befriends Takeru and is one of the very few people that know that Takeru is not native of Madeus. Long ago, he inadvertently liberated Voszraol from a demon king, a deed that Clayston is embarrassed about because he feels that he did nothing of importance. He suffered injuries that affected his ability to fight until Takeru healed him with water from Volidus' lake, which also had the side effect of turning him into a Dragonewt.
Pnir (Hofvalpnir) (プニさん, Puni-san)
Voiced by: Satomi Satō
A Pegasus that protected the village of Ashleth by constantly absorbing the toxins in its lake and a rare flower to blossom nearby. Unfortunately, such an effort caused her to exhaust all her power and turn into stone. She was only awakened when Takeru purifies the lake and, as a result, she saves his life and decides to accompany him in his travels by taking a human form.

== Media ==
=== Light novel ===
No.	Release date	ISBN
1	January 31, 2017	978-4-434-22917-6
2	May 31, 2017	978-4-434-23326-5
3	September 30, 2017	978-4-434-23777-5
4	February 28, 2018	978-4-434-24341-7
5	August 31, 2018	978-4-434-25044-6
6	December 31, 2018	978-4-434-25481-9
7	September 30, 2019	978-4-434-26514-3
8	February 29, 2020	978-4-434-27161-8
9	December 31, 2020	978-4-434-28245-4
10	September 30, 2021	978-4-434-29122-7
11	January 31, 2022	978-4-434-29894-3
12	June 30, 2022	978-4-434-30454-5
13	January 31, 2023	978-4-434-31505-3
14	September 30, 2023	978-4-434-32658-5
15	March 31, 2024	978-4-434-33607-2
16	March 30, 2025	978-4-434-35500-4
17	September 30, 2025	978-4-434-36431-0

=== Manga ===
A manga adaptation illustrated by Tomozo began serialization on AlphaPolis' manga website on December 13, 2017. The manga's chapters have been collected into nine tankōbon volumes as of October 2025. The series was originally published only digitally in English on AlphaPolis' Alpha Manga app. AlphaPolis would later publish the English version physically starting in 2026.

No.	Original release date	Original ISBN	North American release date	North American ISBN
1	November 30, 2018	978-4-434-25264-8	March 31, 2023 (digital); May 5, 2026 (print)	979-8-9933-4763-9
2	September 30, 2019	978-4-434-26368-2	March 31, 2023 (digital); July 7, 2026 (print)	979-8-9933-4764-6
3	July 31, 2020	978-4-434-27631-6	March 31, 2023 (digital); September 8, 2026 (print)	979-8-9933-4765-3
4	August 31, 2021	978-4-434-29282-8	August 25, 2023 (digital)	—
5	May 31, 2022	978-4-434-30342-5	December 22, 2023 (digital)	—
6	March 31, 2023	978-4-434-31769-9	April 26, 2024 (digital)	—
7	December 31, 2023	978-4-434-33121-3	August 23, 2024 (digital)	—
8	August 31, 2024	978-4-434-34354-4	March 21, 2025 (digital)	—
9	October 31, 2025	978-4-434-35677-3	November 28, 2025 (digital)	—

=== Anime ===
An anime television series adaptation was announced on March 10, 2025. It is produced by Genco, animated by Tatsunoko Production and SynergySP, and directed by Yoshinori Odaka, with Gigaemon Ichikawa handling series composition, Mayumi Watanabe designing the characters, and Hiroshi Takaki composing the music. The series aired from October 7 to December 22, 2025, on Tokyo MX and other networks. The opening theme song is "Prologue", performed by Nornis, while the ending theme song is "Mugen Trip" (夢幻トリップ, Mugen Torippu), performed by Nakigoto. Crunchyroll is streaming the series. Muse Communication licensed the series in South and Southeast Asia.

==== Episodes ====
No.	Title	Directed by (Note: Production staff information is taken from the ending credits of each episode.)	Written by	Storyboarded by	Original release date (Note: Tokyo MX and BS11 listed the series premiere on October 6 at 24:00, which is effectively October 7 at midnight JST.) (Note: Episodes are released on U-NEXT, Crunchyroll and simulcast platforms by Muse a week before their televised airings.)
1	"A Drop That Fell"; Transliteration: "Ochita Itteki" (Japanese: 落ちた一滴)	Shuji Saito	Gigaemon Ichikawa	Yoshiaki Okumura	October 7, 2025
Bored salaryman Takeru is suddenly summoned by God who reveals he created a world, Madeus, where civilisations keep collapsing so he is sending Takeru to solve the problem. He grants Takeru powerful magic, a cute companion, abilities in scouting and resource gathering and an infinite storage bag. Awakening near Tormi Village Takeru begins gathering so he will have resources to sell. Village guard Marlow sends him to the general store manager who hires him to collect Misril ore from the Eastern Mountain. Takeru finds the skeleton of Belria Fend, a security corps member. From his body Takeru takes a necklace and a letter from Belria's mother and sister. Reaching the mountain Takeru accidentally disturbs the Ancient Dragon Voldius who is impressed by Takeru's magic which surpasses his own. In exchange for the misril ore Voldius asks Takeru to help his egg which is tainted by miasma and cannot hatch. Takeru pours magic into the egg and faints. A second God appears to him, annoyed that by getting involved with dragons he has permanently changed Madeus already. Takeru awakens and finds a cute new-born dragon he names Bee. As he is stronger than him, Voldius sends Bee to be raised by Takeru in the outside world.
2	"Dinner With No One Else"; Transliteration: "Hitorijanai Bansan" (Japanese: 一人じゃない晩餐)	Yuki Morita & Yūki Tobita	Takahiro Nagano	Satoru Yamashita	October 14, 2025
Takeru discovers Voldius linked his bag to an underground lake infused with his dragon magic, essential to help Bee grow and a useful tonic for Takeru also. Despite Bee being much stronger than him Takeru decides to make sure he raises him properly. Encountering monsters Takeru takes them down with magic and martial arts, planning to cook and eat them. Bee flies them most of the way back to Tormi. Takeru discovers an Yggdrasil branch in his bag which, after receiving some of Bee's dragon magic, blooms into a magic staff. They encounter a female elf starving to death, but she quickly runs away after Takeru feeds her. Confused by the encounter they resume walking to Tormi, collecting resources to sell along the way. He accepts a ride from travelling merchant Porun, his wife Eliza and children Yunan and Kain. Takeru is surprised to learn having a dragon companion he hatched himself automatically makes him a Dragon Knight. Camping for the night Takeru repays the family's kindness with a feast of the rare ingredients he gathered.
3	"Hometown And Journey"; Transliteration: "Kokyō to Tabiji" (Japanese: 故郷と旅路)	Yasuo Ejima	Hitsuji Asakura	Hitoyuki Matsui	October 21, 2025
Takeru bids farewell to Porun and returns to the store manager Jerome with the misril. One of the pieces is misril magic ore, a metal so magical it could power an entire kingdom. Deciding Takeru has skill and luck but no common sense Jerome sends him to Belkaim City where he can learn far more than if he stays in Tormi. Plus, the adventurers guild might be the only place with enough cash to buy the misril magic ore, as its value far exceeds what Jerome can afford. Takeru decides to become an adventurer and see more of the world. Deciding he doesn't need it Takeru combines the magic ore with a lamp and creates a lantern that projects a barrier around Tormi, preventing anything with harmful intentions from entering, which he gifts to the villagers. On the road Takeru encounters Monblanc Crabs he hunts and eats with Bee. Arriving in Belkaim he finds a city populated mostly by adventurers, farmers and woodsmen. The Europa Guilds receptionist, Arianna the rabbit-girl, registers Takeru as an F rank adventurer but is certain having defeated Monblanc crabs and with Bee as his partner he will be promoted quite quickly.
4	"The Demon Lord Descends"; Transliteration: "Maō Kōrin" (Japanese: 魔王降臨)	Mayu Numayama	Atsuo Seo	Hitoyuki Matsui	October 28, 2025
Takeru locates Belria Fend's family and returns his belongings. He also learns Belria's father is sick, so Takeru cures him with healing magic. Lizard-man Clayston reminds Takeru he is already qualified for a Rank promotion, but Takeru isn't interested. Goblins attack Belkaim and Takeru is drafted to help in the healers station by the Guildmaster, who partners him with Muesli the mouse-girl secretary. The Goblins break through so Clayston rushes in to help, despite crippling scars from a past battle. Realising he can't avoid standing out anymore Takeru places a barrier around the healer's tent then joins the battle. He finds Clayston unable to move anymore and uses Voldius' lake water and high level healing to remove his scars. Unintentionally, he also temporarily evolves him into a Dragonewt. Clayston defeats the Goblin Sergeant, ending the battle. Guildmaster doubts Takeru is just a simple gatherer but decides not to question him. Back to normal Clayston demands a full explanation. Takeru tells him about being reincarnated and everything else that has happened. Clayston is grateful for what he did but now has to suppress his violent Dragonewt instincts, so he lectures Takeru on throwing around powerful magic so carelessly. Takeru visits the blacksmith's district searching for something he needs.
5	"The Two Bodyguards"; Transliteration: "Futari no Yōjinbō" (Japanese: 二人の用心棒)	Hideaki Uehara	Takahiro Nagano	Hideaki Uehara	November 4, 2025
Takeru meets Ribl, a cat-girl blacksmith, and asks to buy new scissors for harvesting plants. Ribl arranges for her boss Grusas the dwarf to forge scissors in exchange for Ildra Ore from Ryuhai mine in the dwarf kingdom Voszraol. Takeru agrees, despite rumours the mine is inhabited by a demon. On his trip Takeru overhears the starving elf girl again, this time arguing with a horse trader who tells her the white Pegasus she wants can only be found in Voszraol. Takeru later finds her collapsed in the woods again, so he feeds her. In gratitude she introduces herself as Brolite and offers to travel with him to Voszraol. She explains she wants a white Pegasus for her sister Ryutikara. Takeru hires her as a bodyguard but soon regrets it when her snoring keeps him awake. They encounter Clayston in Voszraol who turns out to be Brolite's friend. Clayston is embarrassed to reveal he is a local hero for having saved Voszraol from demon lord Zengum. King Zorwadeen asks Takeru to discover where the demons came from while looking for his ore. Guild receptionist Zambo acts as their guide and Takeru ends up discovering a vein of Ildrite, an ore superior to Ildra. The demon appears and turns out to be another type of Crab monster, delighting Takeru and Bee who haven't eaten crab in weeks.
6	"The Territory Lord's Entreaty"; Transliteration: "Ryōshu no Setsugan" (Japanese: 領主の切願)	Shuji Saito	Gigaemon Ichikawa	Shuji Saito & Gigaemon Ichikawa	November 11, 2025
Clayston reveals it is a Trango crab and very powerful. Takeru defeats it with ease by freezing it, ensuring the meat stays fresh but exasperating Clayston. Zorwadeen allows Takeru to keep the Trango and pays him, Clayston and Brolite 3 million gold each. Brolite purchases a Pegasus and departs to give it to her sister. Clayston decides to keep an eye on Takeru by registering them as a temporary party, the Azure-Black Brigade. Takeru delivers the Ildrite to Grusas and Ribl for their competition sword, making them burst into tears. Two weeks later Takeru is summoned by Belminant Lusellevach, Lord of the territory that contains Belkaim City. Clayston warns Takeru to behave, since having the support of a noble is a dream for most adventurers. At the Lord's estate they meet his 14 year old daughter first; Tiaris, who demands Takeru hand over Bee as only a noble like her deserves to own a dragon. Rather than yell at her he determines her superior attitude was taught to her by someone called Bernard. Tiaris realises her mistake and apologises. Belminant reveals his wife Meuliteria has been bedridden for 6 months and he heard a rumour Takeru completely cured Belria Fend's father, so he would like him to cure Meuliteria. Takeru diagnoses Meuliteria with numerous health issues, including Iver poisoning which Takeru has never heard of.
7	"Flower Of God"; Transliteration: "Kami no Hana" (Japanese: 神の花)	Fukutarō Takahashi	Atsuo Seo	Hiroaki Shimura	November 18, 2025
First, Takeru heals Meuliteria's damaged eyes. He learns from Belminant that Iver is an ancient poison whose ingredients and antidote have been forgotten for centuries. Feeling desperate, Belminant shows Takeru his family book collection, many of which are in an ancient language. Thanks to a translation skill that Takeru learns from an adventurer's diary, Iver is a golden flower that grows near a lake with a horse shaped statue. Clayston identifies the lake near Ashleth Village. Takeru places a barrier around Meuliteria in case she is attacked. In Ashleth they find the lake polluted by a toxin. To keep themselves alive, the villagers made a deal with the merchant named Engache to trade clean water for one Iver flower per month, known to them as the Divine Flower. Realising Engache poisoned the lake, Takeru restores the village and feeds the villagers in exchange for a flower so he can manufacture an antidote. The children shows him the Lidaz fruit, whose juice is identical to soy sauce. Meanwhile, Takeru's barrier exposes the butler Bernard as Meuliteria's poisoner so Belminant has him arrested but discovers an encoded letter in Bernard's room. Engache visits Ashleth to forcibly take all the Iver flower with his hired thugs.
8	"A Step Towards The Future"; Transliteration: "Mirai e no Ichite" (Japanese: 未来への一手)	Mayu Numayama	Hitsuji Asakura	Mayu Numayama	November 25, 2025
Done appraising the Iver flower, Takeru learns they bloomed from the tears of the Pegasus Hofvalpnir. Engache sets fire to the village and kidnaps Gonza, a child who showed Takeru the Lidaz Fruit. Takeru invents an invisibility spell to infiltrate Engache's castle and discovers that Engache has created a fear of Iver poisoning among the nobility by poisoning Meuliteria, then by taking all the Iver flowers for himself so that he can charge inflated prices for the antidote. Clayston fights the thugs while Takeru rescues Gonza. Knowing his plan has exposed, Engache releases the Lake Demon sealed under the castle. Before Clayston manages to kill it, Takeru is knocked into the still polluted lake. Hofvalpnir appears and rescues him, explaining she created the Iver flowers to absorb the toxins from the lake, but she used up her powers and turned into the stone statue. Having fallen into the lake Takeru has made the lake healthy again, allowing Hofvalpnir to wake up. Takeru invents a teleportation spell to return to Belminant and cures Meuliteria. He returns to the village and demonstrates the uses of soy sauce in cooking. The Elder decides to begin farming Lidaz and make soy sauce famous. Hofvalpnir returns as a beautiful young woman and announces she will be joining Takeru's party as his horse, seeking a life journey with him will be amusing compared to her past. Takeru fears that by having a Goddess around him will be a real pain in the ass.
9	"An Unexpected Visitor"; Transliteration: "Igai na Raihōsha" (Japanese: 意外な来訪者)	Hideaki Uehara	Gigaemon Ichikawa	Hideaki Uehara	December 1, 2025
Thanks to the Ildrite that Takeru collected, Grusas managed to forge a sword which won him the best award and agrees to forge the best scissors he can for Takeru. Hofvalpnir proposes to speed up the forging process by torturing him but rejected by Takeru. Then Grit reach out to Takeru and inform him that there was a material gathering competition which was hosted by Belminant himself, hoping Takeru would join as well and he hesitantly agree to participate. Few days later, the quest was announced to collect the seven-colored wool from rainbow sheep without any outsider's help. Left with no choice, Takeru had to act alone and leaving Clayston to watch over Bee and Hofvalpnir. Using his knowledge, Takeru have no problems conversing with the sheep herd and gather the wools effortlessly, thus won the competition with ease. With that, he was promoted to the special 'FB' rank which allows him to accept quests up to B-rank while still doing F-rank gathering quest. All of a sudden, a warning has been issued that a forest worm is about to invade the city so Takeru and his gang decides to help the guild. Unbeknownst to them, the worm was ridden by Brolite who intended to give Takeru as his ride but he chased it away. During their reunion, Takeru found out that Brolite had risen to A-rank adventurer and was about to invite her to join the Azure-Black Brigade which she intends to. On the other hand, Brolite wants Takeru to help searching for her sister who has run away from home due to marriage reasons. The gang travel to the forest with ease thanks to Hofvalpnir's aid and Brolite opens the portal to her hometown, allowing them to pass through. As soon as Takeru and the others reached Brolite's hometown, a few elves attempted to attack them which Brolite recognizes them.
10	"The Darkness of Brolite"; Transliteration: "Buroraito no Yami" (Japanese: ブロライトの闇)	Mayu Numayama	Takahiro Nagano	Hitoyuki Matsui & Mayu Numayama	December 8, 2025
They are shown to the village, the Great Gowan Tree, which Takeru senses is suffering from mana pollution. Brolite explains Gowan contains the palace of the High Elves, the rulers of all other elves. Takeru meets Brolite's brother Orchesto, who is half her height. Orchesto claims his height comes from their cursed bloodline. Takeru is shocked to learn Brolite is intersex as a result of the curse; mostly female but partially male. As the mana pollution is irritating Takeru purifies the atmosphere. From this, Orchesto confirms Takeru is a figure from elvish legend; a hero with foreign blood who will return life to the forest when High Elves face extinction. Takeru suspects he is not the one the legend refers to. He learns at first the curse only caused reduced physical development, but now no high Elf baby has survived in over 50 years. Takeru meets Queen Oldenvia and shares his belief a monster is causing the mana pollution. In private, he informs his friends he scanned the High Elves and confirmed they all suffer genetic abnormalities caused by incestuous marriages between cousins and siblings. Brolite is shocked to learn their efforts to keep High Elf bloodlines pure caused such deformity, and that the cure is simply to increase genetic diversity by marrying High Elves to normal elves, a.k.a. those with foreign blood. Since convincing the High Elves to change tradition will be difficult Hofvalpnir suggests speaking to the elves God, Libelania.
11	"Cave of Danger"; Transliteration: "Kiken na Hora" (Japanese: 危険な洞)	Tatsurou Kawakami	Atsuo Seo	Tatsurou Kawakami	December 15, 2025
Hofvalpnir cannot sense Libelania anywhere. For assistance they head to nearby Daimos Adventurer Guild. Guild-master Agara admits the pollution is so bad adventurers can no longer accept quests gathering valuable Cat-ear mushrooms from Kieto Hollow. Takeru volunteers to gather as many as possible for her. At the Hollow the pollution is so dense it has even begun killing powerful monsters, so Takeru is forced to cast protective shields on everybody. The Hollow turns out to be infested with insect monsters that can stand the pollution. After killing them Brolite reveals at the deepest part of the Hollow is an altar, but even the elves can no longer remember which God it was built for. They find the mushrooms around the altar and Takeru discovers part of the ceiling collapsed onto the altar, deducing it was caused by the earthquake from when he met Voldius. They are attacked by a Rank S Dark Slug so poisonous even Takeru might die. As its one weakness is fire Brolite blinds it and Takeru attacks it with salt to dry out its protective slime while Bee sets it on fire and Clayston stabs it to death. They also make sure to kill all the eggs with a powerful sunlight spell. The pollution vanishes instantly, allowing Hofvalpnir to sense Libelania.
12	"A World We've Never Seen"; Transliteration: "Mita Koto no Nai Sekai" (Japanese: 見たことのない世界)	Shuji Saito	Gigaemon Ichikawa	Yoshiaki Okumura	December 22, 2025
Hofvalpnir flies them to Pnebra Valley where Libelania's presence is strongest. There they discover an elf village where Brolite reunites with her sister Luticara. Luticara reveals her infant son, Tilwezan, is why she refuses to return home. In her youth she planned to marry Brolite, but the High Elf Elders refused as they considered Brolite's hermaphrodite blood to be cursed. Instead, she ran away and married a normal elf, becoming pregnant with Tilwezan who did not suffer any genetic abnormalities. The next day they locate Libelania, who returns to the Elves Palace where at first the High Elves are furious Luticara had a child outside the High Elf bloodline. Libelania furiously explains she once told the High Elves to value family above everything but at no point did she tell them to only breed within family lines and almost make themselves extinct. With their mistake cleared up representatives of every elven race gather to discuss the future of the elven kingdom. Takeru decides Brolite should stay to help her people while they return to Belkaim, but promise to see her again. Takeru finally picks up his harvesting scissors from Grusas and develops an interest in visiting the ocean. Clayston suggests Danusche port city just as Brolite tracks them down to rejoin their party, having been told to go see the world by her family. God is amazed Takeru changed the fate of an entire species in only a few days and looks forward to what else he will accomplish. In the epilogue, Takeru and his gang are having a seafood feast by the ocean.

== Reception ==
The series won "The AlphaPolis 9th Fantasy Novel Grand Prize" reader award, and has 1.73 million copies in circulation.
