= Harigane Service =

Japanese manga series

- First tankōbon volume cover

ハリガネサービス (Harigane Sābisu)
- Genre: Sports
- Manga
- Written by: Tatsuya Ara
- Published by: Akita Shoten
- Magazine: Weekly Shōnen Champion
- Original run: May 29, 2014 – October 11, 2018
- Volumes: 24
- Manga

Harigane Service Ace
- Written by: Tatsuya Ara
- Published by: Akita Shoten
- Magazine: Weekly Shōnen Champion
- Original run: November 8, 2018 – July 6, 2023
- Volumes: 22
- Manga

Harigane Service Gaiden: Hydra Break
- Written by: Tatsuya Ara
- Published by: Akita Shoten
- Magazine: Monthly Shōnen Champion
- Original run: August 6, 2021 – present
- Volumes: 10
- Anime television film

Animation x Paralympic: Harigane Service
- Directed by: Hiroyuki Ōshima
- Written by: Ryūsuke Mori
- Music by: Rei Ishizuka
- Studio: SynergySP
- Original network: NHK General, NHK E, NHK World
- Released: August 22, 2022
- Runtime: 5 minutes

Harigane Service (Japanese: ハリガネサービス, Hepburn: Harigane Sābisu) is a Japanese manga series written and illustrated by Tatsuya Ara. It was serialized in Akita Shoten's shōnen manga magazine Weekly Shōnen Champion from May 2014 to October 2018, with its chapters collected in 24 tankōbon volumes. A sequel, titled Harigane Service Ace, was serialized in the same magazine from November 2018 to July 2023. An anime television short film adaptation of Harigane Service premiered in the 15th episode of Animation x Paralympic in August 2022 to promote the 2024 Summer Paralympics.

== Characters ==
Kanna Shimodaira (下平 鉋, Shimodaira Kanna)
Voiced by: Kōki Ohsuzu
Shun Hada (波田 瞬, Shun Hada)
Voiced by: Mahiro Takasugi
Joji Mashira (間白 譲治, Mashira Joji)
Voiced by: Shōhei Komatsu
Ibuki Matsukata (松方 一颯, Matsukata Ibuki)
Voiced by: Ryōta Suzuki
Susumu Kaneda (金田 進, Kaneda Susumu)
Voiced by: Hayato Taya

== Media ==
=== Manga ===
Written and illustrated by Tatsuya Ara, Harigane Service was serialized in Akita Shoten's shōnen manga magazine Weekly Shōnen Champion from May 29, 2014, to October 11, 2018. Akita Shoten collected its chapters in twenty-four tankōbon volumes, released from September 8, 2014, to January 8, 2019.

A sequel, titled Harigane Service Ace (ハリガネサービスACE, Harigane Sābisu Ēsu), was serialized in Weekly Shōnen Champion from November 8, 2018, to July 6, 2023. The first tankōbon volume was released on April 8, 2019. As of May 8, 2023, 22 volumes have been released.

A spin-off series, titled Harigane Service Gaiden: Hydra Break (ハリガネサービス外伝ヒュドラブレイク, Harigane Sābisu Gaiden Hyudora Bureiku), started in Monthly Shōnen Champion on August 6, 2021. The first tankōbon volume was released on January 7, 2022. As of October 8, 2025, ten volumes have been released.

=== Short anime film ===
In August 2022, an anime television short film adaptation of Harigane Service was announced. The film was produced by SynergySP, directed by Hiroyuki Ōshima and written by Ryūsuke Mori, with music composed by Rei Ishizuka. It premiered in the 15th episode of Animation x Paralympic on August 22, 2022, to promote the 2024 Summer Paralympics. The film's theme song is "Hyakusetsu Futo" by Hatsune Miku and dance group CONDENSE.
