= Panda-Z =

Japanese anime short series

- Panda-Z: The Robonimation
- Pan-Taron

パンダーゼット THE ROBONIMATION (Pandā Zetto Za Robonimēshon)
- Genre: Comedy; Mecha
- Anime television series
- Directed by: Mamoru Kanbe
- Produced by: Kōji Morimoto; Yoshiaki Orihara; Nao Kimura
- Music by: Panda-Z Band
- Studio: Bee Media; Synergy Japan
- Licensed by: Bandai Visual: US: Bandai Entertainment
- Original network: Kids Station
- Original run: April 12, 2004 – November 1, 2004
- Episodes: 30

Panda-Z: The Robonimation (パンダーゼット THE ROBONIMATION, Pandā Zetto Za Robonimēshon) is a Japanese anime short series created by Shuichi Oshida, considered as a parody of Go Nagai's Mazinger Z. The series is produced by both Bee Media and Synergy Japan and began airing in Kids Station on April 12, 2004, to November 1, 2004.

== Theme ==
Panda-Z: The Robonimation includes characters that were modeled after the main cast of Mazinger Z. None of the characters are voiced, and the show's infrequent dialogue is instead presented through intertitles. Some episodes have no dialogue at all, relying on mime movement, sound effects, and the show's electric guitar-based blues/rock/fusion soundtrack for expression. Each episode is five minutes long, including both the opening and ending credits. The ending credits also include a profile of one character or set piece from the series.

== Story ==
The series consists of short comedy sketches, involving the adventures of Pan-Taron, a super deformed robotic panda, pilot of the Panda-Z mecha, and his equally small cute robotic friends, as they fight the evil Skullpander, leader of the Warunimal forces. The story is confined to the small Robonimal Island (containing Robonimal City and P-Z Labs) and a tiny nearby volcanic island that is home to the Warunimal base. Buildings in Robonimal City are all topped with panda heads.

Never taking itself seriously, the story is often just an excuse to put the characters in common everyday situations, but with a robotic twist, which allows for comical results.

In several episodes the characters can be seen playing the card game Old Maid against one another. The deck they play with has characters from the show on them, including Skullpander as the Joker. In one episode they play Rock-Paper-Scissors...a game made more difficult by their mitten-like hands. Being robots, they can often be seen ingesting batteries for their food. Some other times, the struggle between the two groups is present, but either one of them, or sometimes even both, don't take the fighting seriously.

== Characters ==
=== Robonimal Island ===
- Pan-Taron (パン･タロン) - Pilot of the Panda-Z.
- Dr. Panji (ドクター･パンジィ, Dokutā Panjī) - Taron's grandfather and the director of the laboratory. He is a researcher at the mysterious "Super P-Z" and an authority on Robonimal engineering. He created the Panda-Z along with Taron's father (who left one day years ago and never returned). But outside of that, he is just a kind grandfather, who loves his grandson very much.
- Rabinna (ラビンナ) - A pink robot rabbit with angel wings and a white nurse's outfit. She dreams of becoming a great nurse someday. She has a cheerful, kind personality and also has a strong sense of responsibility.
- Denwan (デンワン) - He is something of a leader in Taron's group of friends. Denwan is dependable, but sometimes, he gets ahead of himself and ends up failing. His dream is to become a great public Denwan someday. (Denwa (電話) is Japanese for "telephone" and Wanwan is the sound a dog makes so he is basically a telephone dog.) He is, however, a pay phone, requiring others to pay him to make an outgoing call. Also, his dial only has seven digits.
- Eteckee (エテッキー, Etekkī) - He is a brilliant and talented scholar. Sometimes, he can be timid and a bit of a scaredy-cat, but he dreams of becoming a researcher at the Panda-Z Lab someday. His name seems to be a pun on "techie" and "monkey", and is a yellow robot monkey.
- Zoutank (ゾウタンク, Zoutanku) - A green robot that is a cross between an elephant and a tank, with a cannon for a trunk. (Zō (象) is Japanese for "elephant".) It seems to be an independent character, rather than merely a vehicle. However, it's large enough for other Robonimals to ride in.
- Kuma Rescue Team (K.Rチーム（くま、れすきゅーチーム）, Kuma, Resukyū ̄Chīmu; lit. Bear Rescue Team) - The rescue professionals at the Panda-Z lab:

- Medical Bear (メディカルベアー, Medikaru Beā) - A white bear with red rescue flasher ears and a doctor's speculum (mirror headband). Rabinna is his nurse.
- Fire Bear (ファイヤーベアー, Faiyā Beā) - Basically the fire fighter of the group.
- Rescue Bears (レスキューベアー, Resukyū Beā) - A pair of nearly identical bear robots, with "01" or "02" on their ears. They're litter-bearers, among other tasks.

- Mechanic Team (メカニックチーム, Mekanikku Chīmu) - Consisting of Hamu Ichiro (ハムーイチロー, Hamū Ichirō) and Hamu Jiro (ハムージロー, Hamū Jirō), they are the mechanical team at the lab. They are both incredible mechanics and Panda-Z's feats are often made possible thanks to these two. They pilot the Ham Gears, giant robots that let them repair Panda-Z at its own scale, as well as carry a damaged Panda-Z off the battlefield. There seems to be no relation between the noncombatant Ham Gears and Dr. Jangarly's Black Ham Gear.

=== Warunimals ===
- Skullpander (スカルパンダー, Sukarupandā) - Leader of the Warunimals, what's beneath his cloak is a source of mystery to his own generals. He is spooky and mysterious and rarely seems to do anything, generally staying in his cloud-wreathed island headquarters.
- Mougyu (モウギュウ, Mougyuu) - A Warunimal general with a cow-like appearance. Mougyu is probably Taron's most frequent opponent. He is often cheated of victory because his remote control breaks, or he is injured when he gets dragged along behind it on the remote's cable. Mougyu's giant robot Moujumbo (モウジャンボー, Moujanbō) uses a large hammer.
- Doctor Jangarly (ドクタージャンガーリ, Dokutā Jangāri) - A robo-hamster with a mustache and a clear dome skull that shows his computer brain. When he smokes, the smoke fills his dome and he shorts out. His giant robot Black Ham Gear (ブラックハムギアー, Burakku Hamu Giā) is not completed until the end of the series, and he frequently threatens dire vengeance once it is ready.
- Wolgar (ウルフガー, Urufugā) - A robot wolf who is perhaps a little too domesticated, sometimes playing fetch when he should be fighting. Normally light gray, he turns red under a full moon. His giant wolf robot Wolgaoh (ウルガオー, Urugaō) has a set of "bone nunchaku".
- Rubyraby (ルビィラビィ, Rubīrabī) - A rabbit-princess with adult proportions (as opposed to the child-body proportions of everyone else). Her giant robot Rubyrabeauty (ルビィラビューティ, Rubīrabyūti) occasionally demonstrates the ability to act on its own, and at one point seems to fall in love with Panda-Z.
- Kokekkou (コケッコウー, Kokekkoū) - A giant robotic rooster, apparently an unpiloted Warunimal asset. It can launch egg bombs, fly, and is assisted by smaller flying robot roosters. Its name is derived from the sound of a rooster's crowing.
- Warunimal Soldier (ワルニマル兵, Warunimaru-hei) - Identical masked minions who wear four color schemes to denote which general they follow: yellow for Mougyu, black for Jangarly, light gray for Wolgar, and pink for Rubyraby. They do not seem to like their generals and sometimes argue amongst each other which group has it the worst.
- Bokkuma (ボックマ) - A box on legs with panda features that serves as Rubiraby's pet.

== Episodes ==
Each episode is five minutes long. The opening theme is "Voyager" by JAM Project.

No.	Title	Original release date
1	"The Strongest Warrior"; Transliteration: "Saikyō no Senshi" (Japanese: 最強の戦士)	April 12, 2004
Pan-Taron pilots his newly-built Panda-Z and battles three of the Warunimals' giant robots until Mougyu begins to lose his cool.
2	"Table Manners"; Transliteration: "Tēburu Manā" (Japanese: テーブルマナー)	April 19, 2004
Taron struggles to eat his batteries on the dinner table while Panji is enjoying his meal.
3	"Certain Death! Rocket Punch"; Transliteration: "Hissatsu! Roketto Panchi" (Japanese: 必殺！ロケットパンチ)	April 26, 2004
Mougyu challenges Taron to a rematch with his new and improved Super Moujumbo, but Panda-Z has a new weapon in its arsenal.
4	"A Quiet Duel"; Transliteration: "Shizukanaru Kettō" (Japanese: 静かなる決闘)	May 3, 2004
Doctor Jangarly challenges Taron and his friends to a game of old maid, but he does not know why he keeps on losing.
5	"The Midnight Angel"; Transliteration: "Mayonaka no Tenshi" (Japanese: 真夜中の天使)	May 10, 2004
A drunk Panji comes home to the P-Z Lab, but he has difficulty finding his room.
6	"Payphone"; Transliteration: "Kōshūdenwa" (Japanese: 公衆電話)	May 17, 2004
Denwan keeps the Robonimal picnic worry-free by answering calls, but when Kokekkou invades the island, Taron must find a way to summon Panda-Z.
7	"Briefing"; Transliteration: "Burīfingu" (Japanese: ブリーフィング)	May 24, 2004
The Warunimal generals prepare their strategy to destroy Panda-Z, but are distracted by the thought of what is underneath Skullpander's cloak.
8	"Rescue Mission: No Postponement for Rain"; Transliteration: "Kyūjo Shirei, Uten Kekkō" (Japanese: 救助指令、雨天決行)	May 31, 2004
When Nurse Rabinna is stranded under a tree on a rainy night, Taron and his friends must devise a plan to rescue her without getting wet.
9	"Wild Soldier"; Transliteration: "Wairudo Sorujā" (Japanese: ワイルドソルジャー)	June 7, 2004
Mougyu and Moujumbo are once again sent to Robonimal Island to battle Panda-Z.
10	"A New Quiet Duel"; Transliteration: "Shin Shizukanaru Kettō" (Japanese: 新・静かなる決闘)	June 14, 2004
Once again defeated and unable to return to the Warunimal base, Mougyu challenges Taron to a game of rock paper scissors for Taron's plate of batteries.
11	"Rescue Mission: No Postponement for Rain, Continued"; Transliteration: "Zoku Kyūjo Shirei, Uten Kekkō" (Japanese: 続・救助指令、雨天決行)	June 21, 2004
When Rabinna is once again stranded on a rainy night, the Kuma Rescue Team must come up with a solution to rescue her without getting themselves wet.
12	"Hey, Bob..."	June 28, 2004
A homeless and hungry Mougyu is offered batteries by Taron, Rabinna, and Denwan, but he refuses to break character in front of them.
13	"A Quiet Duel, Continued"; Transliteration: "Zoku Shizukanaru Kettō" (Japanese: 続・静かなる決闘)	July 5, 2004
Jangarly once again challenges Taron to a game of old maid; this time, he will not give away his weaknesses that cost him the previous game.
14	"Mystery Circle"; Transliteration: "Misuterī Sākuru" (Japanese: ミステリーサークル)	July 12, 2004
When Taron notices today's date circled on the calendar, he asks everyone what the occasion is.
15	"Friends"; Transliteration: "Furenzu" (Japanese: フレンズ)	July 19, 2004
During their lunch break, the Warunimal Soldiers discuss their work environments under their respective superiors.
16	"Rescue Mission: No Postponement for Rain, Final Chapter"; Transliteration: "Kyūjo Shirei, Uten Kekkō Kanketsu-hen" (Japanese: 救助指令、雨天決行 完結編)	July 26, 2004
With Rabinna once again stranded under a tree and the Bear Rescue Team incapacitated by the rain, Taron must deploy Panda-Z when Kokekkou once again invades the island.
17	"Poltergeist"; Transliteration: "Porutāgaisuto" (Japanese: ポルターガイスト)	August 2, 2004
When Robonimal Island experiences a power outage, Taron, Rabinna, and Denwan investigate strange noises within the lab.
18	"Apocalyptic Battle"; Transliteration: "Sentō no Mokushiroku" (Japanese: 戦闘の黙示録)	August 9, 2004
Panda-Z and Moujumbo once again duke it out on the island, with both combatants inflicting major damage on each other.
19	"Night Life"	August 16, 2004
The Warunimals attempt to court Rubyraby, but each of them fails and quickly gets kicked out of her room.
20	"Destroy Panda-Z"; Transliteration: "Pandā Zetto wo Hakai Seyo" (Japanese: パンダーゼットを破壊せよ)	August 23, 2004
On a full moon, Wolgar challenges Panda-Z with his giant wolf robot Wolgaoh, but Taron quickly discovers its weakness.
21	"Destiny"; Transliteration: "Shukumei" (Japanese: 宿命)	August 30, 2004
As the maintenance crew repairs Panda-Z after every grueling battle, Taron is busy playing with his friends.
22	"Battle X"; Transliteration: "Batoru Ekkusu" (Japanese: バトルX)	September 6, 2004
As Panda-Z battles the Warunimals, Rubyraby stares at the sky and ponders on love until Panda-Z is thrown towards her giant robot Rubyrabeauty.
23	"Nice Body"	September 13, 2004
While Skullpander sleeps, the Warunimal generals open his coffin and take a peek at what is beneath his cloak.
24	"The Fabulous Rubyraby"; Transliteration: "Kareinaru Rubirabi" (Japanese: 華麗なるルビィラビィ)	September 20, 2004
Rubyraby attempts to flirt with Taron, but when he shows no interest in her, she uses her Mesmerizing Potpourri to lure him and Rabinna towards her.
25	"A Quiet Duel, Continued Again"; Transliteration: "Zokuzoku Shizukanaru Kettō" (Japanese: 続々・静かなる決闘)	September 27, 2004
Jangarly once again challenges Taron; only this time, it is a staring contest.
26	"Getaway"; Transliteration: "Gettauei" (Japanese: ゲッタウェイ)	October 4, 2004
As the Robonimals are scheduled to have their vaccinations taken, Taron refuses to take his shot, leading to a duel with Medical Bear.
27	"Nurse Rabinna"; Transliteration: "Nāsu Rabinna" (Japanese: ナース・ラビンナ)	October 11, 2004
Nurse Rabinna practices wrapping bandages on Taron, Panji, and Eteckee as part of her first aid class.
28	"Toward Tomorrow"; Transliteration: "Ashita ni Mukatte..." (Japanese: 明日に向かって･･･)	October 18, 2004
While staring at the sunset by the cliffs, Taron thinks about his father.
29	"A Quiet Duel, the Final Chapter"; Transliteration: "Shizukanaru Kettō Kanketsu-hen" (Japanese: 静かなる決闘 完結編)	October 25, 2004
Jangarly once again challenges Taron to a game of old maid; only this time, he has quit smoking and he is confident he will win.
30	"Move Out! Black Ham Gear"; Transliteration: "Kidō! Burakku Hamu Giā" (Japanese: 起動！ブラックハムギアー)	November 1, 2004
Upon the completion of Black Ham Gear, Jangarly challenges Taron and Panda-Z to a duel.

== Home release ==
Panda-Z is collected in six DVD volumes under Bandai Entertainment's "Anime Legends" banner, each of which also has a bonus 3-D animated short and a short featuring a large rotocast Panda-Z toy. The first volume is available with a pack-in Panda-Z toy 3" (8 cm) tall.

The series is currently streaming on Tubi.
