= SynergySP =

Japanese animation studio

SynergySP Co., Ltd.
- Native name: 有限会社SynergySP
- Romanized name: Yūgen-gaisha ShinajīSP
- Formerly: Synergy Japan (1998–2005)
- Type: Subsidiary
- Industry: Anime
- Founded: September 24, 1998; 28 years ago
- Headquarters: Honchō, Koganei, Tokyo, Japan
- Key people: Toshihiro Nakazawa (CEO)
- Revenue: 9,000,000 yen
- Parent: Shin-Ei Animation
- Website: synergy-sp.com

SynergySP Co., Ltd., (Japanese: 有限会社SynergySP, Hepburn: Yūgen-gaisha ShinajīSP) is a Japanese animation studio founded on September 24, 1998, as Synergy Japan which originally split off from Studio Junio (which itself was founded by Toei Animation staff). In 2005, the company became associated with Shogakukan-Shueisha Productions, a subsidiary of the Shogakukan publishing company. In April 2017, the company became a subsidiary of Shin-Ei Animation.

On July 29, 2022, according to their official website, they no longer producing Shogakukan shows and they removed them to the site.

== Works ==
=== Television series ===
- Princess Comet (2001–2002, with Nippon Animation)
- Mermaid Melody Pichi Pichi Pitch (2003–2004, with Actas) (now listed in Actas' productions)
- Panda-Z (2004)
- MÄR (2005–2007)
- Kirarin Revolution (2006–2009) (now listed in G&G Entertainment's productions)
- Shinseiki Duel Masters Flash (2006–2007)
- Hayate the Combat Butler (2007–2008, episodes 1–52)
- Major (2007–2010, episodes 79–154)
- Zettai Karen Children (2008–2009)
- Gokujō!! Mecha Mote Iinchō (2009–2011, with Shogakukan Music & Digital Entertainment)
- Beyblade: Metal Fusion (2009–2010)
- Cross Game (2009–2010)
- Beyblade: Metal Masters (2010–2011)
- Scan2Go (2010–2011)
- Beyblade: Metal Fury (2011–2012)
- B-Daman Crossfire (2011–2012)
- Chibi Devi! (2011–2014)
- Beyblade: Shogun Steel (2012, with Nelvana Animation)
- BeyWheelz (2012)
- B-Daman Fireblast (2012–2013)
- Initial D Fifth Stage (2012–2013)
- Beast Saga (2013)
- BeyWarriors: BeyRaiderz (2014)
- Initial D Final Stage (2014)
- BeyWarriors: Cyborg (2014–2015)
- Battle Game in 5 Seconds (2021, with Vega Entertainment)
- Taisho Otome Fairy Tale (2021)
- A Couple of Cuckoos (2022, with Shin-Ei Animation)
- Too Cute Crisis (2023)
- Sweet Reincarnation (2023)
- Girlfriend, Girlfriend 2nd Season (2023)
- Mr. Villain's Day Off (2024, with Shin-Ei Animation)
- A Salad Bowl of Eccentrics (2024, with Studio Comet)
- Goodbye, Dragon Life (2024, with Vega Entertainment)
- Medaka Kuroiwa Is Impervious to My Charms (2025–present)
- Solo Camping for Two (2025)
- A Gatherer's Adventure in Isekai (2025, with Tatsunoko Production)
- A Gentle Noble's Vacation Recommendation (2026)
- Dead Account (2026)
- Oedo Fire Slayer: The Legend of Phoenix (2026)
- Magic Repo Man (2026)
- Magical Girl Raising Project: Restart (2026)
- Shin Oishinbo (2027, with Vega Entertainment)
- Are You a Landmine, Chihara-san? (2027)

=== OVA/ONAs ===
- Zettai Karen Children (2010)
- Kings of My Love (2011–2013)
- The Magic of Chocolate (2011–2013)
- Ijime (2012)
- Nijiiro Prism Girl (2013)
- Age 12 (2014–2016)

=== Films ===
- Metal Fight Beyblade vs the Sun: Sol Blaze, the Scorching Hot Invader (2010)
- Happy ComeCome (2015)
- Gō-chan. ~Moco to Koori no Ue no Yakusoku~ (2018, with Shin-Ei Animation)
- Animation x Paralympic: Harigane Service (2022)
- Ryan's World the Movie: Titan Universe Adventure (2024, with Shin-Ei Animation)
- You, Fireworks, and Our Promise (2026, with The Answer Studio)

=== Cancelled works ===
- Ten Count (2023, with East Fish Studio)
