= Beast Saga =

Japanese multi-media franchise

- Cover of the first manga volume

ビーストサーガ (Bīsuto Sāga)
- Manga
- Written by: Manabu Honjō
- Published by: Shueisha
- Magazine: Saikyo Jump
- Original run: January 4, 2012 – October 4, 2013
- Volumes: 5
- Anime television series
- Directed by: Katsumi Ono
- Produced by: Rika Sasaki; Yoshikazu Beniya
- Written by: Michihiro Tsuchiya
- Music by: Koichiro Kameyama
- Studio: SynergySP
- Licensed by: NA: Cinedigm
- Original network: TV Tokyo, Toei Animation
- English network: SEA: Toonami
- Original run: January 13, 2013 – September 29, 2013
- Episodes: 52 episodes (38 eps aired on TV + 14 eps unaired)
- Video game

Beast Saga: The Strongest Clash In The Colosseum
- Developer: Nippon Columbia
- Publisher: Takara Tomy
- Genre: Action game
- Platform: Nintendo 3DS
- Released: July 25, 2013

Beast Saga (ビーストサーガ, Bīsuto Sāga) is a Japanese multi-media franchise by Takara Tomy that includes a dice game, manga series, an anime television series and a video game for the Nintendo 3DS. It is similar to Takara's earlier Battle Beasts toyline.

== Characters ==
Liogre (ライオーガ, Raiōga)
Voiced by: Taiten Kusunoki
Big Cero (ビッグセロウ, Bigguserou)
Voiced by: Gou Inoue
Leoparmint (レパーミント, Repaminto)
Voiced by: Yoko Honda
Minedrill (マインドリール, Maindorīru)
Voiced by: Tadashi Miyazawa
Ogre (オーガ, Ōga)
Voiced by: Takuya Eguchi

== Anime ==
On September 4, 2012, Japanese book publisher Shueisha announced the franchise would receive an anime television adaptation. The series, produced by SynergySP, premiered on TV Tokyo on January 13, 2013, at 8:44 a.m. It ran for thirty-eight 11-minute episodes in a half hour block shared with B-Daman Fireblast, which both concluded on September 29, 2013. Similar to SynergySP's Beyblade: Shogun Steel, Beast Saga's internet streaming and international versions were released as twenty-six 22-minute episodes. Two 11-minute episodes were merged into a 22-minute one and included the addition of seven unreleased episodes, which were previously announced as a second season.

In 2014, voice actress Erin Fitzgerald listed Beast Saga on her resume. An English version of the show premiered on Toonami Asia on April 19, 2015. The English dub is recorded in Hong Kong. On February 24, 2021, Cinedigm announced they would stream the series on their CONtv service in North America. The English dub became available at an undisclosed date. It also became available on Cineverse.

=== Episodes ===
No.	Title	Japanese Airdate	US Airdate
1	"The Fist of Ferocity, King Liogre"; Transliteration: "Tekken Doumou Raiooga / Bōkun Jōshu Arudairu" (Japanese: 鉄拳獰猛王ライオーガ / 暴君城主アルダイル)	January 13, 2013 (Part A), January 20, 2013 (Part B)	April 19, 2015
2	"Beast Fight! Showdown Between Warriors!"; Transliteration: "Bīsutofaito Senshi no Kettō / Gyakukuten! Majikkurotto" (Japanese: ビーストファイト戦士の決闘 / 逆転！マジックロット)	January 27, 2013 (Part A), February 3, 2013 (Part B)	April 26, 2015
3	"The Trap of Mandal Mountain"; Transliteration: "Mandaru Sanno Wana / Hangeki! Guroria Oukoku Gun" (Japanese: マンダル山の罠 / 反撃！グロリア王国軍)	February 10, 2013 (Part A), February 17, 2013 (Part B)	May 3, 2015
4	"Golda Rebellion"; Transliteration: "Gooruda no hanran / Goddorotto no Chikara" (Japanese: ゴールダーの反乱 / ゴッドロットの力)	February 24, 2013 (Part A), March 3, 2013 (Part B)	May 10, 2015
5	"Ultimate Clash! Lion VS Tiger"; Transliteration: "Gekitotsu! Shishi VS Tora / Raiooga, shisu!?" (Japanese: 激突！獅子VS虎！/ ライオーガ、死す！？)	March 10, 2013 (Part A), March 17, 2013 (Part B)	May 17, 2015
6	"King's Fight"; Transliteration: "Ou no tatakai / Kokou no ganman urufuxen" (Japanese: 王の戦い / 孤高のガンマン・ウルフェン)	March 24, 2013 (Part A), March 31, 2013 (Part B)	May 24, 2015
7	"Death Heart Gang's Plot"; Transliteration: "Desuhaato danno inbou / Jiguzagu Gawano Ihen" (Japanese: デスハート団の陰謀 / ジグザグ川の異変)	April 7, 2013 (Part A), April 14, 2013 (Part B)	May 31, 2015
8	"Battle of Fang Lock Fortress"; Transliteration: "Kiabjotoride no Koubou / Dai Kaizoku Ou Kiraashaaku" (Japanese: 牙錠砦の攻防 / 大海賊王キラーシャーク)	April 21, 2013 (Part A), April 28, 2013 (Part B)	June 7, 2015
9	"Progress Under Attack"; Transliteration: "Nerawa re ta Puroguresu / Funtou! Jixyuu Soukou Gekigun" (Japanese: 狙われたプログレス / 奮闘！ 重装攻撃軍)	May 5, 2013 (Part A), May 12, 2013 (Part B)	June 14, 2015
10	"Stolen Godlot"; Transliteration: "Ubawa re ta Goddorotto / Kettou! Ooga VS Chitanbaaton" (Japanese: 奪われたゴッドロット / 決闘！オーガVSチタンバートン)	May 19, 2013 (Part A), May 26, 2013 (Part B)	June 21, 2015
11	"Prediction of Storm"; Transliteration: "Arashino Yokan / Repaaminto no ketsui" (Japanese: 嵐の予感 / レパーミントの決意)	June 2, 2013 (Part A), June 9, 2013 (Part B)	June 28, 2015
12	"Wickedness in Mega Tempest"; Transliteration: "Kin noroi! Megatenpesuto / Kixyoudaisui Rixyuuwo Taose" (Japanese: 禁呪！メガテンペスト / 巨大水竜を倒せ！)	June 16, 2013 (Part A), June 23, 2013 (Part B)	July 5, 2015
13	"Land, Sea, Sky! Allied Battle!"; Transliteration: "Rikukaikuu! Sourikisen! / Shitou no hate ni" (Japanese: 陸海空！総力戦！ / 死闘の果てに)	June 30, 2013 (Part A), July 7, 2013 (Part B)	July 12, 2015
14	"Dead Rock Charge"; Transliteration: "Totsunixyuu! Deddolokku / Shinkai no Gekisen" (Japanese: 突入！デッドロック / 深海の激戦)	July 14, 2013 (Part A), July 21, 2013 (Part B)	July 19, 2015
15	"Three Frightful Brother Sharks"; Transliteration: "Senritsu no Shaaku Sankixyoudai / Mantarei no sakebi" (Japanese: 戦慄のシャーク三兄弟 / マンタレイの叫び)	July 28, 2013 (Part A), August 4, 2013 (Part B)	July 26, 2015
16	"Awakening Burst! Super Liogre" (Japanese: 覚醒（バースト）！スーパーライオーガ ビッグセロウ・友情の拳)	August 11, 2013 (Part A), August 18, 2013 (Part B)	N/A
17	"Glorious Festival Commencement" (Japanese: グロリアフェスティバル開幕 対決！オーガVSライオーガ)	August 25, 2013 (Part A), September 1, 2013 (Part B)	N/A
18	"Sailplane above Dark Clouds" (Japanese: ソアラ聖国の暗雲 三国会議・平和の誓い)	September 8, 2013 (Part A), September 15, 2013 (Part B)	N/A
19	"Rematch! Rival's Fate" (Japanese: 再戦！ 宿命の両雄 明日へ！ビーストファイト！)	September 22, 2013 (Part A), September 29, 2013 (Part B)	N/A
