= Battle Beasts =

Line of action figures

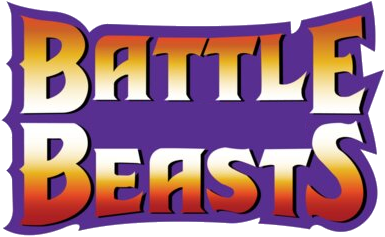
- Product type: Action figure
- Current owner: Tomy
- Country: Japan
- Introduced: 1986
- Discontinued: 1987; 39 years ago
- Related brands: Beast Saga; Supernaturals
- Markets: Japan; USA
- Previous owners: Takara

Battle Beasts (ビーストフォーマー, Bīsutofōmā) is a brand of small 2" tall action figures in the form of anthropomorphised animals with body armor and a unique weapon. Several figures have their left hand replaced by a weapon of some kind.

Battle Beasts were created and largely produced by Takara and distributed by Takara in Japan (under the name "BeastFormers") and by Hasbro outside Japan, beginning in 1986.

== History ==
Battle Beasts were created by Takara of Japan in 1986. Tomy (a.k.a. Takara Tomy) still owns the worldwide rights to the property. The heyday for the toyline came during the period in which it was licensed to Hasbro for distribution outside Japan when Hasbro marketed the toys in America and many other parts of the world. Although in the Japanese market Takara branded the toys as a spin-off of Transformers and even named the toys "BeastFormers", their tie-in to the Transformers universe was not part of the Hasbro story or marketing.

As part of the Takara strategy, many of the Battle Beasts appeared in the episode "Rebellion on Planet Beast" of the Japanese Transformers cartoon series Transformers: The Headmasters. The Battle Beasts reside on the planet Beast.

Four series were released overall. The first three contain beasts 1–76. Each figure has a heat sensitive rub sign on his/her chest and a hand-to-hand weapon. Three pull-back vehicles and three transforming bases were also released. The fourth series had 36 figures and was renamed Laser Beasts, the renaming corresponded with some minor changes to the figures. The entire Laser Beast line was released in Japan, and in small numbers in America and Europe. These figures have orbs in their chest instead of rubs and each came with a gun that resembled the creature who held it. Some small chariots were also released as part of the Laser Beast line in Japan. In addition to these figures, some promo figures were also made. These were made of clear plastic and were available only in special sets.

The figures were released in Japan in small boxes of individual figures and in larger multi-packs. In America Series 1, 2 and the 12 Laser Beasts were released on blister cards with two figures per card. Series 3 figures were only available in boxes of eight per package. The vehicles came in boxes and each came with a figure.

== Story ==
The universe history of 2011 takes place in the galaxy territory of the Decepticon's "Planet Beast".

The intelligent race of animals called BeastFormers lived in peace on Planet Beast. However, the scheming evil hand of the Decepticons bent on domination of the entire universe to the peaceful Planet Beast was fast approaching.

To defeat the Lion Family that ruled Planet Beast, Galvatron supplied Alligatron with weapons in order to overthrow the Lion family. Alligatron was given the Sharkticons, who were the military escorts of the Decepticons to fight in the rebellion. This is how the BeastFormer war began.

The Beast Star was suddenly engulfed in war. Before Alligatron the wielder of the Decepticon Power and his Decepticon Beast's could capture the Cybertron Beasts, they were able to escape into the forest. In order to ask for help from the Autobots, the Cybertron Beast's strongest warrior Platinum Tiger had to make his way to the occupied communication room of the palace.

Alligatron planted a trap there called the "Holography Mirror". As soon as Platinum Tiger unwittingly set foot in the palace, a sudden flash of light trapped the strongest warrior in the holography mirror.

Is Planet Beast going to remain under occupation? What about the fate of the Supreme Commander White Leo's Cybertron Beasts? Can Platinum Tiger escape from the power of the Holography Mirror? Right now, the battle and mystery of the BeastFormers is just beginning.

=== Series 1–3: Battle Beasts ===
Battle Beasts came out in the late 1980s and like most toys of the era, had a gimmick to help sales. Each Battle Beast had a heat sensitive sticker on his chest which, when rubbed would reveal the warrior's strength. The symbols would represent either fire, wood or water and could be used in a rock, paper, scissors type game—fire beats wood, wood beats water, water beats fire. Later a fourth emblem was added, the Sunburst, and it would beat all other types. The Sunburst was extremely rare, in a ten pack in Japan, or Pirate Leo was available in America as a variant, despite claims that there were others of that affiliation. Each Beast also carried his own distinctive weapon which could be identified to its Beast with the corresponding number.

In the U.S. Battle Beasts came in packages of two, usually (but not always) in numerical order. It was impossible to tell which figure had a rub of fire, wood, or water until the package was opened. That came in handy with marketing, as their slogan was, "Fire! Wood! Or Water!... You'll never know until you own them!". Also listed on the packages starting with Series 2 was the possibility of getting the Sunburst Warrior. There was a total of three series adding up to 76 Battle Beasts beginning with #1, Pirate Lion and ending with #76, Ossified Orangutan.

Series 1 & 2 were released in Japan, Europe and North America while Series 3 was only released in Japan, the U.K. and the U.S.

=== Series 4: Shadow Warriors ===
The fourth and final series released was named Shadow Warriors, or Laser Beasts in Japan. The heat sensitive sticker was replaced by an orb that could be seen through, depicting which clan the Beast represented.

The Shadow Warriors had a new slogan on the American package that read "Fire! Wood! Water!... Only the crystal shield will reveal their strength!". Shadow Warriors carried guns instead of the hand-to-hand weapons that the Battle Beasts had, and each gun resembled the creature to which it belonged.

The entire new series of 36 Laser Beasts and new sleds were released mainly in Japan. North America only received 12 of the new Laser Beasts, which were packaged as "Shadow Warriors" in two-pack blister cards. These were mainly sold by Value City stores. No accessories, such as sleds or shields, were released, although they appeared on the packaging. Some of the lower numbered Lasers were produced in Europe and a few came with unique shields and sleds that like the guns, resembled the animal it belonged to. The sleds from Japan were available in two colors (grey and bordeaux) and both were included in the Six Shield Battler set. In France a third color, purple, appeared. This exclusive color was included in the blister packs of Laser Beasts #93 to #96, the grey one was available with Beasts #89 to #92, and the bordeaux was available with Beasts #97 to #100. The main color of the sled is not the only difference. The color of the wheels change too. The grey sled has orange wheels, the bordeaux sled has black wheels and the purple sled has yellow wheels.

Six of the 12 shields were released only in Europe; #89 Brown Lion, #92 Hustlebear, #95 Dragon Seahorn, #97 Seapanic, #98 Puzzlecolor and #100 Scope Cougar.

== List of Battle Beasts ==
All races are taken from the Battle Beasts/Laser Beasts Japanese Cards:

=== Series 1 ===
==== Autobots ====
- White Leo – An anthropomorphic white lion ( ライオン rion) who is the eyepatch-wearing leader of the Autobot-aligned Battle Beasts and the King of Historam, North Snarl. Birth Place: Layku City. Role: (総司令官 Sōshi reikan) (Supreme Commander) His English name is Pirate Lion. He is the eleventh King of the Lion family, which has existed for thousands of years. Besides excelling in martial arts, he has supernatural abilities that allow him to use the ancient arts of universal creation that have been passed down from generation to generation.
- Big Serow – An anthropomorphic serow (カモシカ kamoshika) who is the King of Saitan, Kantonia. Birth Place: Saitan. Role: (副官 Fukkan) (Adjutant). During the Great War, he served as White Leo's advisor. He has an excellent mind for tactical planning, and is meticulous and systematic in his actions. He is always calm, friendly, and kind. His English name is Deer Stalker.
- Golder – An anthropomorphic tiger (タイガー taigaa) and the Emperor of Gun Marino, Kantonia. Birth Place: Gunmarino Plateau. Role: 陸上参謀(陸上参謀 Rikujō sanbō) (Land-Based Staff Officer). He has a serious and strong sense of justice, and has the physical strength and tenacity to persevere in whatever he believes in. However, he also has a stubbornness that makes it difficult for him to change his opinion once he has decided to do something. His English name is Ferocious Tiger.
- Fly Kick – An anthropomorphic white eagle (鷲 washi) who is the Emperor of Historam, North Snarl. Birth Place: Histrom Plateau. Role: (空中戦士 Kūchū senshi) (Aerial Warrior). During the Great War, he distinguished himself as an aerial warrior. Never one to dwell on anything, he has a big heart and a strong desire to improve. The downside is that he sometimes gets carried away. His English name is Colonel Bird.
- Elephan – An anthropomorphic elephant (ゾウ zou) who is the King of Stoll, Kantonia. He serves as the Transportation Combatant for White Leo's forces. His English name is Sledgehammer Elephant.
- Gray Sharp – An anthropomorphic rhinoceros (サイ sai) who is the King of Petra, Muland. He serves as the Land Attack Warrior for White Leo's forces. His English name is Rocky Rhino.
- Gray Ox – An anthropomorphic water buffalo (水牛 suigyuo) who is the Emperor of Petra, Muland. He serves as the Amphibious Attack Warrior for White Leo's forces. His English name is Roamin' Buffalo.
- Battle Bear – An anthropomorphic brown bear (ヒグマ brown kume) who is the Emperor of Saitan, Kantonia. He serves as the Mountains and Forest Combatant for White Leo's forces. His English name is Grizzly Bear.
- Bonga – An anthropomorphic gorilla (ゴリラ gorira) who is the King of Halas in the Uorī Archipelago. He is the Land Attack Commander for White Leo's forces. His English name is Gargantuan Gorilla.
- Wild Thunder – An anthropomorphic wild boar (イノシシ inoshishi) who is the Emperor of Stoll, Kantonia. He serves at the Land Attack Warrior for White Leo's forces. His English name is Swiny Boar.
- Bea Fox – An anthropomorphic fox (キツネ kitsune) who is the King of Ringostan, South Snarl. He serves as the Reconnaissance Combatant for White Leo's forces. Her English name is Sly Fox.
- Yellow Giraffe – An anthropomorphic giraffe (キリン kirin) who is the King of Gun Marino, Kantonia. He serves as the Military Intelligence Combatant for White Leo's forces. His English name is Rubberneck Giraffe.
- Hedgehog – An anthropomorphic hedgehog (ハリネズミ harinezumi) who is the King of Hogland, North Snarl. He serves as a Special Forces Combatant for White Leo's forces. His English name is Prickly Porcupine.
- Rabbit Kid – An anthropomorphic rabbit (ウサギ usagi) who is the King of Rabbihos Island off the coast of North Snarl. He serves as the Communications Combatant for White Leo's forces. His English name is Hare Razing Rabbit.
- Bowdog – An anthropomorphic dog (イヌ inu) who is the King of Bowdonia, North Snarl. He serves as a Science Warrior for White Leo's forces. His English name is Danger Dog.
- Blue Horse – An anthropomorphic horse (馬 uma) who is the Emperor of Rabbihos Island off the coast of North Snarl. He serves as the High Speed Warrior for White Leo's forces. His English name is Sir Sire Horse.
- Giader – An anthropomorphic weasel (イタチ itachi) who is the King of Sunatoria, North Snarl. He serves as the Land Attack Warrior for White Leo's forces. His English name is War Weasel.
- Violet Horn – An anthropomorphic bison (バイソン baison) who is the Emperor of Bowdonia, North Snarl. He serves as the Strong Warrior for White Leo's forces. His English name is Bloodthirsty Bison.
- Bomb Sheep – An anthropomorphic sheep (ヒツジ hitsuji) who is the King of Sheepnia, North Snarl. He serves as the Supply Line Worker for White Leo's forces. His English name is Bighorn Sheep.

==== Decepticons ====
- Alligatron – An anthropomorphic albino alligator (ワニ wani) who is the King of Lennonia, South Snarl and the leader of the Decepticon-allied Battle Beasts. His English name is Gruesome Gator.
- Killer Fish – An anthropomorphic carp (鯉 carpio) who is the Emperor of Lennonia, South Snarl. He serves as a Staff Officer for Alligatron's forces and sports an injury he gained during his fight with Big Serow. His English name is Killer Carp.
- Snake Bomb – An anthropomorphic snake (ヘビ hebi) with snake heads for hands who is the Emperor of Barāki, Kantonia. He serves as the Reconnaissance Officer for Alligatron's forces. His English name is Triple Threat Snake.
- Drill Frog – An anthropomorphic frog (カエル kaeru) who is the King of Barāki, Kantonia. He serves as the Underwater Offensive Soldier for Alligatron's forces. His English name is Horny Toad.
- Devil Bat – An anthropomorphic bat (コウモリ koumori) who is the Emperor of Ringostan, South Snarl. He serves as the Airmobile Soldier for Alligatron's forces. His English name is Blitzkrieg Bat.
- Black Turtle – An anthropomorphic turtle (カメ kame) who is the Emperor of Halas in the Uorī Archipelago. He is part of the Amphibious Infantry of Alligatron's forces. His English name is Hardtop Tortoise.
- Bad Shark – An anthropomorphic shark (サメ same) who is the Emperor of Sheepnia, North Snarl. He serves as an Underwater Soldier for Alligatron's forces. His English name is Sawtooth Shark.
- Death Spider – An anthropomorphic spider (クモ kumo) who is the Emperor of Hogland, North Snarl. He serves as the Special Attack Soldier for Alligatron's forces. His English name is Webslinger Spider.
- Crab Hit – An anthropomorphic crab (カニ kani) who is the Emperor of Sunatoria. He serves as the Underwater Attack Soldier for Alligatron's forces. His English name is Crusty Crab.

=== Series 2 ===
==== Autobots ====
- Power Jaguar – An anthropomorphic jaguar (ジャガー jyagaa) who is the King of Arxan, Yutoranta. He serves as the Land Attack Aide-De-Camp for White Leo's forces. His English name is Jaded Jag.
- Strong Hippo – An anthropomorphic hippopotamus (カバ kaba) who is the King of Gamborudia, Yutoranta. He serves as the Amphibious Transportation Expert for White Leo's forces. His English name is Humongous Hippo.
- Wave Moose – An anthropomorphic moose (ヘラジカ herajika) who is the King of Ellas in the Uorī Archipelago. He serves as the Ultrasonic Mountain Warrior for White Leo's forces. His English name is Major Moose.
- Jungaroo – An anthropomorphic kangaroo (カンガルー kangaru) who is the King of Chibara, Kantonia. He serves as the Leaping Warrior for White Leo's forces. His English name is Kickback Kangaroo.
- Sea Iron – An anthropomorphic walrus (セイウチ seiuchi) who is the Emperor of Chibara, Kantonia. He serves as the Underwater Mobility Expert for White Leo's forces. His English name is Wolfgang Walrus.
- Dark Raccoon – An anthropomorphic raccoon (アライグマ araiguma) who is the Emperor of Madra, Yutoranta. He serves as the Explosives Officer for White Leo's forces. His English name is Dragoon Racoon.
- Smileduck – An anthropomorphic duck (アヒル ahiru) who is the Emperor of Tell e-Sawwan, Muland. He serves as the Amphibious Attack Warrior for White Leo's forces. His English name is Run Amuck Duck.
- Undergroun – An anthropomorphic mole (モグラ mogura) who is the King of Rhodes in the Uorī Archipelago. He serves as the Underground Attack Warrior for White Leo's forces. His English name is Miner Mole.
- Beavop – An anthropomorphic beaver (ビーバー biibaa) who is the Emperor of Arxan, Yutoranta. He serves as the Amphibious Scout for White Leo's forces. His English name is Eager Beaver.
- Yellow Camelus – An anthropomorphic camel (ラクダ rakuda) who is the King of Tell e-Sawwan, Muland. He serves as the Underground Attack Warrior for White Leo's forces. His English name is Hunchback Camel.
- Polar Battlebear – An anthropomorphic polar bear (北極グマ hokkyoku guma) who is the King of North Yutoranta, Yutoranta. He serves as the Ice Field Combatant for White Leo's forces. His English name is Pillaging Polar Bear.
- Flying Attacker – An anthropomorphic flying squirrel (ムササビ musasabi) who is the Emperor of Harriso, South Snarl. He serves as the Land and Air Attack Specialist. His English name is Squire Squirrel.
- Platinum Tiger – An anthropomorphic Smilodon (saber-toothed tiger) (サーベルタイガー saiberu taigaa) who is the King of Harriso, South Snarl. He serves as the Honorary Warrior for White Leo's forces. His English name is Sabre Sword Tiger.
- Bullorn – An anthropomorphic Bulldog (ブルドッグ Burudoggu) who is the King of Madra, Yutoranta. He serves as the Sergeant for White Leo's forces. His English name is Bludgeoning Bulldog.

==== Decepticons ====
- Iguanamonss – An anthropomorphic iguana (イグアナ iguana) who is the King of Onomis in the Uorī Archipelago. He serves as the Special Disruption Soldier for Alligatron's forces. His English name is Icky Iguana.
- Browngyro – An anthropomorphic armadillo (アルマジロ arumajiro) who is the Emperor of Ellas in the Uorī Archipelago. He serves as the Armored Land Soldier for Alligatron's forces. His English name is Armored Armadillo.
- Green Chameles – An anthropomorphic chameleon (カメレオン kamereon) who is the Empress of Onomis in the Uorī Archipelago. She serves as the Camouflage Attack Soldier for Alligatron's forces. Her English name is Δ Chameleon.
- Red Octo – An anthropomorphic octopus (タコ tako) who is the Emperor of Tamarahamu, Yutoranta. He serves as the Sea Mine Soldier for Alligatron's forces. His English name is Octillion Octopus.
- Scout Mouse – An anthropomorphic mouse (ネズミ nezumi) who is the Emperor of Gamborudia, Yutoranta. He serves as the Special Scout Soldier for Alligatron's forces. His English name is Powerhouse Mouse.
- Power Nozzle – An anthropomorphic anteater (アリクイ arikui) who is the King of Tamarahamu, Yutoranta. He serves as the Vacuum Attack Soldier for Alligatron's forces. His English name is Antic Anteater.
- Cuttle Deep – An anthropomorphic cuttlefish (コウイカ kouika) who is the Emperor of North Yutoranta, Yutoranta. He serves as the Deep Sea Disruption Soldier for Alligatron's forces. His English name is Cutthroat Cuttlefish.
- Juniordragon – An anthropomorphic seahorse (タツノオトシゴ tatsunotoshigo) who is the King of Agos in the Uorī Archipelago. He serves as the Deep Sea Disruption Soldier for Alligatron's forces. His English name is Slasher Seahorse.
- Knightowl – An anthropomorphic owl (フクロウ wakurou) who is the King of Agos in the Uorī Archipelago. He serves as the Night Warfare Commander for Alligatron's forces. His English name is Knight Owl.
- Ultragas – An anthropomorphic skunk (スカンク sukanku) who is the Emperor of Rhodes in the Uorī Archipelago. He serves as the Maneuver Soldier for Alligatron's forces. His English name is Pew-Trid Skunk.

=== Series 3 ===
==== Autobots ====
- Strong Panda – An anthropomorphic panda (パンダ panda) who is the King of East Yutoranta, Yutoranta. He serves as the Combat Medic for White Leo's forces. His English name is Panzer Panda.
- Koala Gray – An anthropomorphic koala (コアラ koara) who is the King of Lapaul, South Snarl. He serves as the commander of Grassland Reconnaissance for White Leo's forces. His English name is Killer Koala.
- Black Jaguar – An anthropomorphic melanistic leopard (黒ヒョウ kuro hyou) who is the King of Nupal, Yutoranta. He serves as White Leo's head bodyguard. His English name is Black Panther.
- Dreameater – An anthropomorphic tapir (バク baku) who is the Emperor of Uruk, Muland. He is part of the Special Combat Unit for White Leo's forces. His English name is Torrential Tapir.
- Baboon – An anthropomorphic mandrill (マンドリル mandoriru) who is the Emperor of Nirmud, Muland. He serves White Leo's forces as the Staff Officer for Mountains and Forests. His English name is Manic Mandrill.
- Dog Hunter – An anthropomorphic Pointer (ポインター Pointaa) who is the King of Iriano, Yutoranta. He is the commander of the High Speed Reconnaissance Unit for White Leo's forces. His English name is Pixilated Pointer.
- Būpink – An anthropomorphic pig (ブタ piggu) who is the King of Hilles in the Uorī Archipelago. He serves as the Food Reconnaissance for White Leo's forces. His English name is Pillager Pig.
- Razorkukku – An anthropomorphic chicken (ニワトリ niwatori) who is the Emperor of East Yutoranta, Yutoranta. He serves as the Air Staff Officer for White Leo's forces. His English name is Rowdy Rooster.
- Muskhorn – An anthropomorphic muskox (ジャコウウシ jakouushi) who is the King of West Yutoranta, Yutoranta. He serves as a Mountain Combatant for White Leo's forces. His English name is Musky Ox.
- Slo – An anthropomorphic sloth (ナマケモノ namakemono) who is the King of Hamanan, Kantonia. He serves as a Staff Officer for White Leo's forces. His English name is Slowpoke Sloth.
- Earthhog – An anthropomorphic aardvark (ツチブタ tsuchibuta) who is the Emperor of Hamanan, Kantonia. He serves as a Grassland Combatant for White Leo's forces. His English name is Ardent Aardvark.
- White Cow – An anthropomorphic dairy cattle (乳牛 nyougyou) who is the King of Uruk, Muland. He is part of the Resource Development Unit for White Leo's forces. Her English name is Bodacious Bovine.
- Zebra Ball – An anthropomorphic zebra (シマウマ shimauma) who is the King of Johnston, South Snarl. He serves as the Grasslands Staff Officer for White Leo's forces. His English name is Zealot Zebra.
- Duck Diver – An anthropomorphic platypus (カモノハシ kamonohashi) who is the Emperor of Lapaul, South Snarl. He serves as the Underwater Reconnaissance Officer for White Leo's forces. His English name is Diving Duckbill.
- Mingo Kid – An anthropomorphic flamingo (フラミンゴ furamingo) who is the Emperor of Hilles in the Uorī Archipelago. He is the commander of the Air Combat Unit for White Leo's forces. His English name is Frenzied Flamingo.
- Little Serow – An anthropomorphic serow (カモシカ kamoshika) who is the King of Palmyra, Muland. He is a Land Combatant Specialist for White Leo's forces. His English name is Fleet-Footed Antelope. It is unknown if he is related to Big Serow.
- Peguinis – An anthropomorphic penguin (ペンギン pengin) who is the Emperor of Johnston, South Snarl. He is the Ice Field Combatant for White Leo's forces. His English name is Pungnacious Penguin.
- Udan – An anthropomorphic orangutan (オランウータン oranuutan) who is the Emperor of Iriano, Yutoranta. He serves as a Staff Officer for White Leo's forces. His English name is Ossified Orangutan.

==== Decepticons ====
- Shield Dragon – An anthropomorphic frilled lizard (エリマキトカゲ erimakitokage) who is the Emperor of Zigrad, Muland. He serves as the Communications Soldier for Alligatron's forces. His English name is Leapin' Lizard.
- Demonkey – An anthropomorphic tarsier (メガネザル meganezaru) who is the Emperor of Palmyra, Muland. He serves as a Demolitions Soldier for Alligatron's forces. His English name is Tarsier Tyrant.
- Cobrander – An anthropomorphic king cobra (キングコブラ kingu cobura) who is the King of Zigrad, Muland. His English name is King Cobra.
- Pangol – An anthropomorphic pangolin (センザンコウ senzankou) who is the Emperor of West Yutoranta, Yutoranta. He serves as an Armored Soldier for Alligatron's forces. His English name is Tanglin' Pangolin.
- Eagle Killer – An anthropomorphic hawk (鷹 taka) who is the King of Nirmud, Muland. He serves as the Sky Maneuver Soldier for Alligatron's forces. His English name is Harrier Hawk.
- Crow Max – An anthropomorphic crow (カラス karasu) who is the Emperor of Nupal, Yutoranta. He serves as the Air Staff Officer for Alligatron's forces. His English name is Crooked Crow.

=== Laser Beasts ===
The Laser Beasts are a formidable race of anthropomorphic animals that live beneath the surface of Planet Beast and were created by the mighty Three Wise Ones. The lenses on their chest armors can absorb and store artificial solar energy and power itself. After their underground city and artificial sun were destroyed, the Laser Beasts made their way to the surface to take in the solar energy from the real sun which led them into conflict with the Battle Beasts.

- Tiger Burn – An anthropomorphic tiger (トラ tora who is the Emperor of the Laser Beasts.
- Skull Grotess – An anthropomorphic dragon (ドラゴン doragon) who is the Assault General of the Laser Beast army and a second-in-command of Tiger Burn.
- Battle Fennec – An anthropomorphic fennec fox (フェネック fenekku) who is one of the Shield Battler-6.
- Blue Eagle – An anthropomorphic eagle (鷲 washi) who is the Air Strike Officer of Laser Beasts.
- Brain Mouse – An anthropomorphic mouse (ネズミ nezumi) who is the Underground Maneuver Officer of the Laser Beasts.
- Brown Lion – An anthropomorphic lion (ライオン raion) who is the commander of the Ground Assault Unit of the Laser Beasts.
- Condorashin – An anthropomorphic condor (コンドル kondoru) who is the Air Attack Officer of the Laser Beasts.
- Dino Gator – An anthropomorphic crocodile (クロコダイル kurokodairu) who is the head of the Marine Attack of the Laser Beast army where he answers to Skull Grotess.
- Dragon Seahorn – An anthropomorpic narwhal (イッカク ikkaku) who is the Underwater Maneuver Specialist of the Laser Beasts.
- Fight Horn – An anthropomorphic reindeer (トナカイ tonakai) who is one of the Shield Battler-6.
- Flying Dragon – An anthropomorphic dragonfly (トンボ tonbo) who is a member of the Aviation Force of the Laser Beast army.
- Fly Sailor – An anthropomorphic flying fish (トビウオ tobiuo) is a Marine Attack Officer of the Laser Beasts.
- Green Rayfer – An anthropomorphic stingray (エイ i.e.) who is part of the Underwater Maneuver portion of the Laser Beasts.
- Gren Cat – An anthropomorphic Persian cat (ペルシャネコ Perushaneko) who is one of the Shield Battler-6.
- Ground Wolf – An anthropomorphic wolf (オオカミ ookami) who is the Land Attack Officer of the Laser Beasts.
- Horn Head – An anthropomorphic bighorn sheep (ビッグホーン bigguhoon) who is a Land Stormtrooper in the Laser Beast army.
- Hustle Bear – An anthropomorphic grizzly bear (グリズリー gurizurii) who is a Land Attack Officer of the Laser Beasts.
- Jeerer Monkey – An anthropomorphic proboscis monkey (テングザル tenguzaru) who is a member of the Intelligence Unit of the Laser Beast army.
- Kickback – An anthropomorphic grasshopper (バッタ batta) who is part of the aviation unit of the Laser Beast army.
- Killer Hound – An anthropomorpic Collie (コリー Korii) who is one of the Shield Battler-6 and answers to Strong Hurricane.
- Kingbuster – An anthropomorphic Tyrannosaurus (ティラノサウルス tiranosaurusu) who is a Land Stormtrooper in the Laser Beast army.
- Mant Frenzy – An anthropomorphic hamadryas baboon (マントヒヒ mantohihi) who is one of the Shield Battler-6.
- Monkey Fighter – An anthropomorphic Japanese macaque (ニホンザル nihonzaru) who is a member of the Intelligence Unit of the Laser Beast army.
- Puzzle Color – An anthropomorphic chameleon (カメレオン kamereon) who is a member of the Intelligence Unit of the Laser Beast army.
- Rainbow Sam – An anthropomorphic parrot (オウム oumu) who is a Special Intelligence Officer in the Laser Beast army.
- Sairon – An anthropomorphic rhinoceros (サイ sai) who is part of the Land Assault Forces of the Laser Beast army.
- Salmomancer – An anthropomorphic salmon (サケ sake) who is a Marine Assault Soldier of the Laser Beast army.
- Scope Cougar – An anthropomorphic cougar (クーガー kuugaa) who is a Special Staff Officer of the Laser Beast army where he answers to solely Tiger Burn.
- Sea Panic – An anthropomorphic humpback whale (ザトウクジラ zatoukujira) who is a Marine Assault Specialist of the Laser Beast army.
- Sky Bat – An anthropomorphic brown long-eared bat (ウサギコウモリ usagikoumori) who is the commander of the Air and Intelligence portions of the Laser Beast army and answers to Skull Grotess.
- Slag King – An anthropomorphic Pteranodon (プテラノドン puteranodon) who is the commander of the Ground Forces of the Laser Beasts and answers to Skull Grotess.
- Spark Shark – An anthropomorphic sawshark (ノコギリザメ nokogirizame) who is a Marine Attack Officer of the Laser Beast army.
- Strong Hurricane – An anthropomorphic Eurasian scops-owl (コノハズク konohazuku) who is the commander of the Shield Battler-6 and answers to Skull Grotess.
- Surr (Surreal) – An anthropomorphic centipede (ムカデ mukade) who is the Underground Maneuver Officer of the Laser Beast army.
- Unarchy – An anthropomorphic mole (モグラ mogura) who is an Underground Maneuver Officer of the Laser Beast army.
- Zariganian – An anthropomorphic crayfish (ザリガニ zarigani) who is an Underwater Maneuver Officer of the Laser Beast army.

== Vehicles ==
A number of vehicles were released throughout the line. For the Battle Beast line, three chariots and three bases were released that looked like animals, and each came with one figure that was not unique to the vehicle. The chariots were able to hold up to three figures comfortably and each had its own name: Tearin' Tiger, which looked like a tiger, Big Horn which looked like a ram and Deer Stalker which looked like a deer. All the chariots had a pull-back motion that would spring the vehicle forward when it was released.

The three bases were the Blazing Eagle (known as the Firebird in a toy commercial for the vehicles), Shocking Shark and Wood Beetle. Each base had a unique symbol theme that matched the "Fire, Wood, Water" concept that the line was based on. Each base could hold several figures and had a jail-cell with which to hold captured Beasts.

The Laser Beast line had several vehicles as well. Three Battle chariots which were smaller than the Battle Beast chariots could be purchased with a unique figure, and several types of Drills were released as well.

To date, there are four known types of Drills to exist, all of which are the same design but feature different colors; Gold, Maroon, Yellow and Blue. The Blue Drill is the rarest, with only three or four known to exist.

== Premium figures ==
There were several promotional figures released in Japan throughout the run that could be obtained in certain ways, mainly through mail-aways or by purchasing special sets.

Most of the figures weren't exactly new, as most of the premium figures were just repaints of previously existing molds. Figures that were repaints were the Stone Cobra, Clear Gator, Clear Carp and the Striped Carp. The only exception to this rule was the mail-away offer for the #101 Skull Grotess figure, which was a completely original figure.

Premium figures were available in various ways. The Clear Gator and Sunburst Lion could be obtained by purchasing a Japanese 10-pack set that contained either one figure or the other although the owner couldn't tell until he or she opened the package. The Stone Cobra could only be obtained through the mailing of the two halves of the "Stone Tablet". One half could be found in the Japanese Fire Phoenix playset (which was the Japanese equivalent to the American Blazing Eagle set), while the other was in the Sunburst Lion set. The Stone Cobra was sent out in two different waves due to a larger demand than Takara originally expected. The first way came with no rub, the second came with a sticker that had White Leo's face on it.

The Clear and Striped Carps could be found in the Japanese "Punch Box" set, which was basically a box that had covers which the owner would "punch" to find a figure. The Striped Carp was much more rare than the Clear version.

The Skull Grotess figure could be purchased (along with a Gold Drill) through a mail-away offer exclusively. An order form advertising the figure could be found in almost all single-figure packages sold in Japan.

== Merchandise ==
Blackthorne's Battle Beasts #1.

Starting with the second series of figures in America, a 23" x 30" poster was available via mail order featuring drawings of all the Battle Beasts as well as their names.

A strap called the Bandolier was introduced for children to hold and carry around their Battle Beasts figures, in the middle of it was a box that has the Battle Beasts logo on it and all over it are compartments to hold several figures.

A comic series simply titled Battle Beasts was published by Blackthorne Publishing from February through November 1988. There were only four issues published by the company before it was canceled on a cliffhanger. All four issues were published in black-and-white. The stories were written by John Stephenson, penciled by Andy Ice, and inked by Jorge Pacheco (issues 1 and 2), Shepherd Hendrix (issue 3), and Rachel "Fuzzy" Haze (issue 4). They centered primarily on seven characters: Horny Toad, Knight Owl, and Gargantuan Gorilla dealing with the betrayal of Chameleon, Rocky Rhino, Blitzkrieg Bat, and Cutthroat Cuttlefish, who interrupted a ceremony with the Soulspirit causing madness and constant sign changes among their people. A sludgy devil character called Ruhin was also featured. The final issue implied that Pirate Lion, piloting the Shocking Shark with first mate Webslinger Spider, was the Sunburst Warrior who would be able to set things aright. Two annuals were published as well, although by a different company and they were only released in Europe. The stories are unrelated to the Blackthorne series.

== Revivals ==
In 2011 Takara Tomy announced the Beast Saga line, a spiritual successor to the original figures. The line focuses on three factions – land, air and sea. The fire/wood/water battling mechanism was replaced by a dice launcher which enables a dice battle game between figures. The series was released in September 2012. Figures include shields in addition to weapons and have been released in monthly waves. Shonen Jump produced a manga based on the toy line and an anime was released in 2013.

At the 2009 San Diego Comic Con, Diamond Select Toys acquired the Battle Beasts brand name after Hasbro allowed the trademark to lapse. They displayed a playset featuring a Minimates version of their new Battle Beasts line. The playset was to become available for sale on December 31, 2009, but was cancelled. Several repaints of the figure were sold in 2010, and at C2E2 2012 the company confirmed they would be going forward with a full line of figures. Additionally, a comic book based on the Minimates franchise was released by IDW Publishing in May 2012.
