= Beyblade: Metal Fury =

- Season 3
- No. of episodes: 52 (Japanese version); 39 (English version)

Release
- Original network: TV Tokyo
- Original release: April 3, 2011 – April 1, 2012

Season chronology
- ← Previous; Metal Masters Next → Shogun Steel

Beyblade: Metal Fury, known in Japan as Metal Fight Beyblade 4D (メタルファイト ベイブレード 4D, Metaru Faito Beibrēdo Fō Dī) is the third season of the Japanese anime television series Beyblade: Metal Saga based on Takafumi Adachi's manga series Beyblade: Metal Fusion, which itself is based on the Beyblade spinning top game from Takara Tomy and Hasbro. Following directly after Beyblade: Metal Masters, the season features Gingka and company as they travel the world in search for the ten "Legendary Bladers" needed to defeat Nemesis, the God of Destruction. The 52-episode season (39 in the dub due to the merger of the second 26 episode half into 13 episodes due to their shortened 11 minute runtime) is produced by d-rights and Nelvana under the direction of Kunihisa Sugishima.

The season was first broadcast on TV Tokyo in Japan from April 3, 2011, until April 1, 2012. The season premiered in Singapore on August 19, 2012, on Cartoon Network. It later premiered in the United States on October 13, 2012, on Cartoon Network. It premiered in Canada on YTV on January 26, 2013, and in Australia on Channel Eleven on April 30, 2013. The season had its season finale on July 4, 2013, even though it had a missing episode "Orion's Whereabouts". Due to this, Channel Eleven screened it on July 5, 2013, completing the whole season.

Two pieces of theme music were performed for this season. The opening theme is "Kokoro no Yūki" (心の勇気; "Brave Heart"), performed by YU+KI, and the ending theme is "Destiny", performed by YCHRO.

== Episode list ==
No. overall	No. in season	Title	Original release date	English air date
103	1	"Star Fragment"; Transliteration: "Hoshi no Kakera" (Japanese: 星の欠)	April 3, 2011	October 13, 2012 (US); April 30, 2013 (AUS)
It is the dawn of another new day. A new Star Fragment, similar to the one that created the original Pegasus and L-Drago, has entered the Earth's atmosphere. Yuki, a young astronomer and a Blader, is keen to see the mysteries behind the Star Fragment and unlock its secrets. Before the Star Fragment collides with the earth it explodes and sends beams of light across the world. Yuki and his Beyblade, Mercury Anubius, are hit by one of the beams of light and sent flying. After getting up, Yuki notices his Bey is shining and begins some research. However, there are some that have the same views but for a different purpose, Pluto and his apprentice, Johannes. Elsewhere, Madoka is fixing Gingka's Galaxy Pegasus which was badly damaged during the battle against the Spiral Core. All of a sudden, a beam of light similar to the one that hit Yuki's Bey hits Pegasus. The results are the same with Pegasus shining. The next day, Gingka and Kenta are at a local Beyblade tournament. With Kenta continuously defeating his opponents, Gingka bursts out cheering, despite the fact it is against the rules as he is commentating on the matches. Several rule violations later, Kenta is announced the winner of the tournament and is given a trophy. Upon reaching the B-Pit, Gingka lets loose with excitement when he sees his newly fixed Bey and thanks Madoka, who was sleeping. Upon awaking, Madoka tries to explain what happened the night before but Gingka and Kenta run out, already deciding to have a battle. While outside Gingka notices an arrow flying at Madoka and almost hits her. The arrow contains a challenge note from an anonymous person. Gingka quickly accepts despite not knowing who the challenger is. Gingka and his friends arrive at a beach only to be greeted by Kyoya and Benkei who are on a boat in the beach's ocean. Before long, a battle breaks out between Gingka and Kyoya who wish to settle the score once and for all. Rock Leone appears to be stronger than ever and ends up throwing boulders at Galaxy Pegasus. Back on the island, Gingka and Kyoya are stopped by a mud hole in which Leone has gotten stuck in. Pegasus attempts to use Star Booster Attack on it only to be stopped by Leone's Lion Gale Force Wall. In a huge explosion, Pegasus and Leone evolve into Cosmic Pegasus and Fang Leone much to their owners' surprise. The Beys seem to have hidden potential and Madoka cannot find any data on either Beyblade. Pegasus is soon pushed into a corner by Leone and is about to lose all its remaining rotations, however, Pegasus' Performance Tip changes and both Beys soon begin their full power attacking spree again. Both Gingka and Kyoya appear to be shocked and the two Beys cause another massive explosion. Kenta, Madoka, and Benkei cover their eyes and when they open them they are shocked to see Gingka and Kyoya knocked to the ground while their Beyblades keep spinning. Meanwhile, Yuki is rushing to board a ship to find Gingka. However, Johannes is spying on him without Yuki noticing, with the company of a cat.
104	2	"Legendary Bladers"; Transliteration: "Rejiendo Burēdā" (Japanese: レジェンドブレー)	April 10, 2011	October 20, 2012 (US); May 1, 2013 (AUS)
Yuki had just arrived to his destination by plane to study the Star Fragment. However, he is stopped by none other than Johannes. Johannes challenges him to a battle and they proceed. Yuki's Anubius fights against Johannes's Beat Lynx. Anubius gets overpowered by Beat Lynx and Yuki and Anubius flee from Johannes but Johannes follows them. Elsewhere, Gingka and friends are having some practice battles. Gingka battles against Kenta while Benkei battles against Kyoya. Gingka and Kenta have a strong battle and Gingka defeats Kenta with his special move Final Drive, while Kyoya beats Benkei. Benkei then has a flashback to when they battle and he lost and he and Kyoya witnessed the Star Fragment fly pass them. Madoka and Hikaru watch as they battle. Madoka states that she has found out via her computer that Fang Leone is able to have a mode-change by simply flipping the Metal Frame turning it into "Counter-Mode". The same is with Cosmic Pegasus, it enables a mode change by turning the PC Frame left. Madoka and Hikaru tell this to Kyoya while he battles. Kyoya tells them that he has no care of this mode-change and knows he can battle just fine normally. He storms off while Benkei follows him. Yuki rushes to escape from Johannes but fails. Kyoya finds them and Yuki begs Kyoya to help him. Kyoya declines, he tells Yuki he needs to fight his own battles and learn some new skills and leaves Yuki for bait. However, Gingka launches Pegasus at Beat Lynx, saving Yuki. Yuki notices that Gingka holds a Bey with the power of the Star Fragment. Johannes then retreats. Yuki thanks them for saving himself but collapses to the ground. Gingka and friends pick him up and get him help. Yuki arrives safely onto a hospital bed and feels relieved. Meanwhile, Hikaru talks to Ryo about the Beyblade's power. Ryo knows they contain power of the Star Fragment and in the wrong hands it will be dangerous. Yuki explains to them why Johannes was chasing him. Yuki tells that when he was younger, his grandfather told him of the Star Fragment. This Star Fragment was said to have created the original Pegasus and L-Drago. Yuki, being an astronomer, aspired to study about this. So, one day when he was doing some research, Yuki witnessed the Star Fragment first hand. It exploded and let out eleven beams of light. One beam of it crashed into his Bey, Anubis and gave Anubis the power of the Star Fragment. Yuki then tells them a being called "Nemesis" is plotting to use the unknown power of the Star Fragment in order to control the world along with the "Black Sun". Yuki says that they have to stop Nemesis or else, the whole world will be doomed. There are also these mystical Bladers called the "Legendary Bladers" who have the power of the Star Fragment inside their Beyblades and are able to stop Nemesis. Gingka and Kyoya are two of them however there are eight more Legendary Bladers. Gingka and his friends are intrigued at Yuki's story and Gingka vows to stop Nemesis. Gingka then holds Pegasus and decides to name it Cosmic Pegasus. Kenta and the rest agree too. Yuki is relieved by this and is glad that he has a friend in Gingka and finally Gingka and Co.'s quest to stop Nemesis begins. Yuki tells them that most of the Legendary Bladers are unknown, however Gingka and co decide to find them, Meanwhile, Johannes sitting on a building petting cats, watches them and will do anything to stop their quest.
105	3	"Lynx, The Monster Cat"; Transliteration: "Kaibyō Rinkusu" (Japanese: 怪猫リンクス)	April 17, 2011	October 27, 2012 (US); May 2, 2013 (AUS)
Gingka and company chat to their old friends Masamune and Team Wang Hu Zhong via webcam. They ask if they have heard anything about the Legendary Bladers or whether any of their Beyblades had evolved. Unfortunately, they do not know what they are talking about and are confused. Masamune shows Gingka his Ray Striker as nothing has made it different. They ask why they need to know this and Gingka tells them that his Pegasus evolved into Cosmic Pegasus. They are amazed at this as he tells them Pegasus has a piece of the Star Fragment inside of it. Masamune states that he will try to become a Legendary Blader just like Gingka. They say their final words and end the webchat. Gingka is disappointed that he still does not have any information on the Legendary Bladers. Gingka then decides to start their quest to find the Legendary Bladers. Kenta and Madoka agree and they run off to prepare for the trip. Meanwhile, Yuki and Ryo have a little chat. Yuki thanks him for their co-operation in their quest and goes off to prepare as he found out that a Star Fragment Beam hit the island of Indonesia. Ryo then has a chat with Tsubasa. Ryo tells Tsubasa to secretly find information on the Legendary Bladers and he accepts. Later, the gang are ready for their quest to begin. Yuki joins them and tells them that he has second thoughts on Kyoya. He has a flashback of when Kyoya did not help him when he was attacked by Johannes. Gingka responds by saying they'll knock some sense into him. Kenta then tells Gingka that he wants to become a Legendary Blader himself just like Gingka. Gingka appreciates his determination and hopes for the best. The gang start to walk on their quest as five cats watch them. The gang then get blocked by what appears to be many other cats, signaling Johannes to appear. Johannes won't let the gang pass and challenges Gingka to a battle. Gingka gladly accepts but Yuki decides to battle him instead. Gingka tells him to let him do it and he doesn't want Yuki to get hurt. Gingka launches his Cosmic Pegasus as Johannes launches his Beat Lynx. Pegasus gets a good start as it knocks Beat Lynx into the air. The Beys run in the battle as their owners follow them. Pegasus gets a few more hits and it seems as if Beat Lynx will lose. However, Beat Lynx dodges one of Pegasus' attacks. It then changes into a different height making it harder for Pegasus to get a shot. Madoka reads this on her computer and does not know how that is possible. However, at the last minute, Kyoya reveals himself and launches his Fang Leone at Beat Lynx. Leone does even more damage and defeats Beat Lynx. Johannes takes Lynx and escapes. Gingka and Co thank Kyoya for helping them and are grateful. Kyoya tells them that he will join their quest to find the Legendary Bladers. The gang are excited at this and thank him. Benkei, as well joins. The gang then run off to continue their quest.
106	4	"L-Drago Destructor"; Transliteration: "Eru Dorago Desutoroi" (Japanese: エルドラゴデストロイ)	April 24, 2011	November 3, 2012 (US); May 3, 2013 (AUS)
Gingka and co are riding a ship to their first destination, Zarkan Island, in Indonesia. As they step onto the island, they meet a villager. The villager tells them that because of recent volcanic activity, it is highly possibly that a volcano will erupt. At that moment, they hear the ground rumbling and shaking. The gang take precaution as they continue their search. They find a village and hope that they can get some help. However, the villagers see they own Beyblades. They escape into their homes in fear. Gingka and Co. don't know what's going on as the villagers proceed to pelt them by throwing various items. Kyoya decides he will find his own route to the Star Fragment and leaves with Benkei. As the gang try to find a Star Fragment light beam, they find a little girl playing with her Beyblade. She attempts to knock over a soda can with her Bey but fails. The gang introduce themselves to the girl and she says her name as Sala. Madoka sees her Beyblade but sees it is not strong enough. So she opens her suitcase and replaces the Spin Track and Performance Tip with "more suitable" ones. Sala tries out her Bey and it gets stronger as it hits the can and the can goes flying into the sky. Sala thanks them for the parts and has some battles with them. The gang then continue their search and find themselves in a barn. They hide there as they hear a villager of the island. Sala runs freely but is stopped by her father. He asks her what she is hiding and takes her Bey. He then hears a grumbling noise coming from the barn. Madoka gets angry at Gingka because he is hungry. They are revealed to Sala's father. Sala's father takes them to a feast for them to eat. He explains the reason the villagers are afraid of Beys. An anonymous blader infiltrated their village to get up the volcano. The villagers tried to stop him as it's a sacred mountain belonging to the "dragon emperor". The blader says that he will test whether this "dragon emperor" really exists, and said that the true dragon is in front of them. The blader created an explosion, and went up the volcano. One night, a light fell from the sky into the volcano. Gingka and the others wondered if it could be... Meanwhile, Kyoya and Beneki are arriving near a volcano, there Kyoya spots a person, Kyoya discovers the anonymous person was Ryuga who now controls a new Beyblade, L-Drago Destructor. Kyoya proceeds to battle him with his Fang Leone. The two hit it off as the Beys clash each other in their attacks. As the Beys fight, Leone sends the new L-Drago into the sky in a hit. Ryuga likes his encouragement but tells him he cannot win. Gingka and the gang decided to go up the volcano and find Ryuga, and sneaked out of the house and Sala joined them.
107	5	"Awaken Anubius!"; Transliteration: "Kakusei! Anubiusu" (Japanese: 覚醒! アヌビウス)	May 1, 2011	November 10, 2012 (US); May 7, 2013 (AUS)
Ryuga and Kyoya continue their battle from the previous episode. L-Drago is taking all of Leone's hits without any effect which shocks Kyoya and the others. Soon enough, Kyoya proves to be too weak to defeat Ryuga and loses. Benkei tries to help Kyoya by comforting him while Gingka turns angry at Ryuga. Yuki then explains to Ryuga the story of The Star Fragment, the Legendary Bladers, and Nemesis. Ryuga doesn't believe this story and rejects the offer to help them in their quest. Gingka, turning furious by this, attempts to force him to cooperate by battling him with his new Cosmic Pegasus. Ryuga notices the new Pegasus, but does not think it will do much effort to his L-Drago. The battle begins in a clash of the Beys. L-Drago Destructor occurs a "mode-change" and behaves in a different manner, beating Pegasus more efficiently. Gingka tries to ignore the change and fight but, he again is defeated like Kyoya; Gingka towers to the floor defeated. Ryuga has defeated two Legendary Bladers effortlessly and prepares to turn back and leave but Yuki stops him. He tells him he wants a chance to battle him and help in their quest. Ryuga questions at how Yuki can beat him, but as Yuki launches his Bey, Ryuga does the same. The Beys fight as Yuki tries to win against Ryuga. After many hits, Yuki turns angry and soon enough, he begins glowing with a blue light, indicating that Yuki is indeed a Legendary Blader. Unleashing his Legendary Power, his encouragement attacks with such force against L-Drago Destructor. Despite this, Yuki is defeated by Ryuga. Nevertheless, Gingka and co comfort him. Ryuga believed the story after seeing Anubius change, but said that to increase his power, he will get all the star fragments into his possession, and leaves laughing.
108	6	"Requirements of a Warrior"; Transliteration: "Senshi no Shikaku" (Japanese: 戦士の資格)	May 8, 2011	November 17, 2012 (US); May 8, 2013 (AUS)
Gingka and Co. have just relieved themselves from their battles with Ryuga who leaves them. Gingka thinks about what Ryuga said. They need to get stronger and decide to do this. He confronts Kyoya and asks him for help. They need to become stronger as Legendary Bladers. Kyoya accepts to help train Gingka and himself to become stronger. The Bladers battle near giant rocks as their Beys clash with explosions while in their heated battle. The rest spectate as Kenta wants to become a Legendary Blader like Gingka but does not think he can. Yuki tells him he will help him. Kenta smiles at this and accepts this. Meanwhile, Sala visits the gang but is surprised when she sees Kenta and Yuki battling. The Beys fight but Sagittario is having a very hard time fighting Anubius. Kenta turns in doubt that he will ever become a Legendary Blader as Sala is saddened by this. Later, the gang have a feast courtesy of Sala's father. They all say their thank yous but Kenta is still saddened by the fact that he failed to become a Legendary Blader. The next day, Kenta trains with cans just like Sala used to. Sagittario succeeds at this but Kenta still does not seem fit. Sala then approaches him and offers to help with her own Bey. Back at village, the volcano has begun to erupt; lava is already spurting out. The villagers panic at this while Gingka and co try to stay calm. Sala's father attempts to find Sala while Gingka and friends try to stop the eruption. Kenta and Sala try to get back to the village but get stuck in a dead-end when fiery rocks, caused by the volcano get in their path. Sala begins to cough due to the smoke. Kenta launches Sagittario at the rocks attempting to break it but fails. He finds the power inside of him to break through the rock and saves Sala and himself. They escape to the village where Sala hugs her father. Kenta oversees Gingka, Kyoya, and Yuki using their power as Legendary Bladers to stop the volcano's lava and have it instead escape into the water. The villagers rejoice at this while Kenta is just sad. The gang gets onto a boat and when Kenta talks to them. He states he wants to journey on his own to become a Legendary Blader. They are in doubt at first but Gingka accepts this. Kenta boards a ship where he shakes hands with Gingka and sets sail on his own so that he can become a Legendary Blader on his own.
109	7	"Kenta's Determination"; Transliteration: "Kenta no Ketsui" (Japanese: ケンタの決意)	May 15, 2011	November 24, 2012 (US); May 9, 2013 (AUS)
In a village near the Mohenjo-daro ruins, a Bey tournament is commencing. Contestants battle their way to get to the top and Ryuga, who is on his own search for the Legendary Bladers, enters. He battles and blows the competition away. In the semi-finals he fiercely defeats his opponent. Ryuga is searching for the Star Fragment but despite this, he does not wait for the finals and abruptly leaves. Suddenly, a mysterious figure stops him in his path and reveals himself to be Kenta. Ryuga questions who Kenta is and Kenta topples over explaining that he is one of Gingka's friends. Kenta wants Ryuga to help Gingka and Co. on their quest to find the Legendary Bladers. Ryuga does not comprehend and attempts to leave. Kenta claims to be a Legendary Blader, and challenges Ryuga to a battle, which he loses. Ryuga was angry at being lied to, and left. Kenta refuses to allow this to happen and follows him on a trackless path to convince him to help Gingka and Co. They travel through mountains, jungles and other dangerous roads as Kenta attempts to convince Ryuga. The two meet a tiger in the jungle. Kenta gets frightened and attempts to climb a tree but fails while Ryuga just scares the tiger away with his stature. Kenta then proceeds to follow Ryuga. Meanwhile, Gingka and Co. are training their hardest. Benkei throws trees at Kyoya in which he uses Fang Leone to destroy them, Gingka trains hard when launching Cosmic Pegasus with Madoka while Yuki does some research on the Legendary Bladers. Day turns into night when Ryuga and Kenta camp for the night. Ryuga eats a fruit and sleeps while Kenta, who is hungry, is deciding on whether to eat one of Ryuga's fruit. He attempts to launch his Bey to obtain it but Ryuga wakes up to defend his fruit and launches Kenta back; he then goes back to sleep. Kenta dreams of him and Ryuga arriving at Gingka and Co. where Ryuga has agreed to help and Gingka and Co. throw Kenta up in the air in happiness. Later, a dust storm commences as Kenta is having difficulty convincing Ryuga. It starts to rain as Kenta lies down on the floor. When he wakes up, he finds Ryuga waiting for him and follows him. The two make camp again as Ryuga eats a fish on a stick. Kenta still hasn't eaten and is desperate as Ryuga gives one to him. Kenta then eats it as Ryuga tells him to go away after eating. Kenta begins to cry and begs him to help Gingka and the others, and that he will never give up. L-Drago's beast rises up behind Ryuga, but Kenta says that although he is weaker than the tiger in the jungle, he will not be scared away. After a while, Ryuga tells him to keep challenging him, even if the other is sleeping or eating, until he can get him to be serious.
110	8	"The Crimson Flash"; Transliteration: "Shinku no senkō" (Japanese: 真紅の閃光)	May 22, 2011	December 1, 2012 (US); May 10, 2013 (AUS)
Chao Xin is taking a walk with his many fans. However, he hears a disruption near them. Chao abruptly leaves them and runs at the roof of houses to find out what the commotion is. He finds two expelled Beylin Bladers attempting to attack innocent boys. Just when Chao is about to launch his Bey to stop the two Bladers, another Bey is launched instead. It knocks out the two Bladers in a crimson red hue and returns to its owner. Chao finds a group of mysterious Bladers, all wearing robes. They have small grins on their faces and leave, prompting Chao to question what is going on. Meanwhile, Gingka and co are traveling on a quest to China. Gingka and friends received a message via webchat by Dashan Wang who tells them about a rumor. The rumor is that an anonymous Blader who keeps finding expelled Beylin Bladers and defeating them. They travel to Dashan's place judging on whether it is a Legendary Blader or not. As they arrive, they have a reunion with Team Wang Hu Zhong, Dashan Wang, Mei-Mei and Chi-yun Li, however Chao is not there at the moment. The team are amazed as the Bey while Kyoya does not think it is that impressive. Gingka and co see how after the tournament, Big Bang Bladers, Team Wang Hu Zhong have started to train monks in learning how to fight. Dashan then tells them that the anonymous Blader might be participating in a tag-tournament just a few days away, called the "Gateway to Success". Gingka is very excited, and show them his Pegasus. Dashan and the others are stunned, but Kyoya is not, and left with Benkei to practise for the competition. Gingka decides to have a little training as he launches Pegasus. Pegasus knocks out practice targets and finishes off in a success. Yuki decides to go out and try it with his Anubius but fails as he misses one target. He tries again but fails. Chi-yun said that he expected more from a Legendary Blader, but Dashan noticed that all the targets hit by Yuki was hit at the bullseye. Gingka and co congratulate him despite his failure. Later everyone has dinner as they have a chat and Yuki explain that his frequent uses of a telescope helped him hit the targets accurately. Chi-yun says that he can also do this and leaves. Dashan follows him and asks what's wrong. Chi-yun tells him that if someone as pathetic as Yuki can be a Legendary Blader then why can't he be one too. Dashan tells him not to mind this and he is a natural. However, an explosion occurs nearby with everyone heading there. As they arrive they find none other than Johannes. Johannes is searching for the Legendary Blader, and told them to hand him over. Gingka and the others identified him as a "cat weirdo", and Johannes told him his name. Then Gingka and Johannes had a squabble about whether the Legendary Blader is here, who is attacking the expelled Beylin Bladers, and who is the Legendary Blader. Johannes is disappointed and left, but Dashan challenged him. They battle in one of Dashan's homemade BeyStadiums. They both let it rip as their Beys fight each other. Dashan's Rock Zurafa against Johannes' Beat Lynx. Johannes beats down Rock Zurafa by launching it into the air. Da Shan uses his inner strength to fight back but this is not good as Beat Lynx is still spinning. Johannes gets tired and summons his Lynx back, forfeiting the battle as he can't sense the star fragment inside his bey. The rest of Team Wang Hu Zhong prepare to launch their Beys at Johannes but he leaves them. Chao returns to tell them of what he has seen. A Bey with a crimson red hue knocking out two Bladers by a mysterious group of people wearing robes, raising questions on who they are. The next day, Johannes is eating some food and wondering who will be his partner as he's also going to join the competition as he finds a group of children beyblading. He offers to be their partner but they run away in fear. One boy remains and when he asks him to be his partner, the boy cries leading to his mother coming and taking her son away. Johannes later spots some mysterious Bladers wearing robes and one, holding a Bey with a crimson red hue. Johannes decides to go and investigate this. Now Gingka and co call Johannes cat boy thingy as a pet name and presume he is a legendary blader
111	9	"The Greatest Tag-Team Tournament"; Transliteration: "Saikyō taggu-sen, touryūmon" (Japanese: 最強タッグ戦、登竜門)	May 29, 2011	December 8, 2012 (US); May 15, 2013 (AUS)
Gingka and co are on a boat tour with Team Wang Hu Zhong. They explain that their destination is a hidden arena floating on a river where a tag-tournament is taking place. A blimp overhead appears and the Chinese DJ announces that the "Gateway to Success" Tag battle will soon begin. Fans begin cheering as the gang approaches. Chi-yun Li explains that Gingka and Kyoya have already been entered in the competition much to their surprise. Gingka quickly, excited for the competition, selects Yuki as his partner leaving Kyoya to battle with Benkei. Yuki states that he is honoured that Gingka picked him and says that he will not let him down. Mei Mei and Chao Xin reply to these stating that they are entering as a tag-team and Dashan Wang and Chi-yun Li will be entering as a team too. Chao Xin then appeals to his fangirls with a wave causing much screaming and also causing Mei-Mei to sigh. An extra boat appears containing more contestants including Bao, Aguma and Johannes. Kyoya walks up to Yuki and tells him not to let Gingka lose because that's his job, intimidating Yuki slightly. The camera then cuts to Johannes and his younger sister Motti, who, like Johannes, has an attitude like a cat. The Chinese DJ then announces that the tournament's first match is starting. This match is won quickly by Dashan Wang and Chi-yun Li. The next match is once again quickly won by Benkei and Kyoya with a single hit from Dark Bull's Red Horn Uppercut. The third match features Johannes and Motti facing two confident karate black belts. These two intimidate Motti to which Johannes triggers the battle. The teams launch their Beys and Johannes immediately warns Motti to back away while he delivers the first blow. Lynx changes its height to 220 to evade the invading Beys. Lynx then changes to Assault Mode and smashes the enemy Beys out of the stadium, winning the match. The next match is revealed to be Gingka and Yuki versus Mei Mei and Chao Xin. This shocks both pairs and they prepare for battle. Yuki enters the arena but gets booed instantly. Gingka simply says to ignore it. They all launch their Beys but Yuki misfires and launches at the sky. Anubius lands safely but is soon launched back into the sky alongside Pegasus. Yuki apologises and decides to go in for the kill. Yuki's plan backfires when Chao Xin's Bey halts to a stop and sends Anubius flying for the third time. Gingka instructs Pegasus to attack both enemy beys at once much to their surprise. Both Beys counter attack with their special moves sending Pegasus backwards. Yuki then decides to go for another strike but ends up having it dodged and hitting Pegasus instead, sending it flying into the sky but just barely landing inside the stadium. Yuki becomes scared to make a move and it worsens when he remembers Kyoya's words from earlier. Gingka defends Yuki and orders Pegasus to switch to Upper Mode. This backfires yet again with Mei Mei cutting holes into the stadium causing water to flow through, slowing Pegasus and allowing for both beys to shunt Pegasus to the edge of the stadium. Gingka reminds Yuki of the time he battled Ryuga, giving Yuki strength to help Pegasus and use a special move. Pegasus uses Final Drive to hit Anubius, supplying it with power to use Brave Impact. This eliminates both enemy Beys giving Gingka and Yuki the win. Aguma and Bao seem impressed by the demonstration of power and say they are "Looking forward to battling them".
112	10	"A New Roar!"; Transliteration: "Aratanaru hōkō!" (Japanese: 新たなる咆哮)	June 5, 2011	December 15, 2012 (US); May 16, 2013 (AUS)
In the first two battles of the second round of the Gateway to Success, Gingka and Yuki and Dashan and Chi-yun easily defeat their opponents. In the third battle of the second round, Kyoya and Benkei face off against Johannes and Motti. Johannes has been a nuisance to Gingka and co in the past, however upon learning that Johannes may be a Legendary Blader, Kyoya goes all out against him on his own to see if he truly is one. Benkei then sees that Motti isn't interested in the battle at all and goes to attack but she pleads with him to stop, which he does as Benkei once saw a stray cat before. He then gets angry because he realizes he was tricked after Motti attacks him. Benkei goes underground to attack Motti, who afterwards pleads with him again, but Benkei does not fall for it and goes to attack her again, but Johannes sees this and stops Benkei from attacking, Motti thanks Johannes for saving her and falls in love with him until he gets angry and shouts at Motti. He then uses the sand to create a twister which knocks both Benkei and Motti out, leaving just Johannes and Kyoya. Kyoya uses the sand to create a sand version of Lion Gale Force Wall which lifts Beat Lynx into the air and a new special move, King Lion Crushing Fang, giving Kyoya and Benkei the win. The next match sees Bao and Aguma battle which they win with ease, sending them into the next round.
113	11	"Cosmic Tornado"; Transliteration: "Biggu Ban Torunēdo" (Japanese: ビッグバントルネード)	June 12, 2011	December 22, 2012 (US); May 17, 2013 (AUS)
114	12	"The God of Saturn, Kronos"; Transliteration: "Doseishin Kuronosu" (Japanese: 土星神クロノス)	June 19, 2011	January 5, 2013 (US); May 21, 2013 (AUS)
The finals of the Gateway To Success tournament have arrived! Gingka and Yuki will be battling against the team of Aguma and Bao. This is their chance to find out if Bao or Aguma are Legendary Bladers. The Stadium rises, much to the shock of Gingka and Yuki as they see walls and barriers on the Stadium, giving it a maze-like appearance. This will hinder the Beys movement and possibly make them prone to ambush. The Bladers ready their Beys and launch them at full force. Yuki chooses to attack Bao's Bey, Hell Crown while Gingka decides to attack Aguma's Bey, Scythe Kronos. The Bey Forest Fist Team gain the upper hand against Gingka and Yuki; pushing them around and ramming them against the walls of the stadium. Gingka and Aguma even glow with their Legendary Blader aura. This makes it even harder to give a chance for Gingka and Yuki to fight back. Yuki won't let this happen and unleashing his Legendary Power, giving Anubius the boost is needs ram Hell Crown against rocks which trap Hell Crown. With this, it allows Yuki to join Gingka in defeating Aguma. Despite two against one, Aguma does not seem to mind and fights back. Cosmic Pegasus and Mercury Anubius keep striking and ramming Scythe Kronos that it might as well seem that Gingka and Yuki will win. This of course does not last very long as Hell Crown gets out of its trap and helps Scythe Kronos. Madoka notices via her computer that Scythe Kronos has flipped its PC Frame, possibly giving it a mode-change. Aguma unleashes his full potential and dodges the opposing Beys' attacks. Scythe Kronos unleashes a hurricane of rocks that fly everywhere and just then, Scythe Kronos' Beast appears striking at Pegasus' Beast. In one final clash, the three beys go flying as they stop spinning except for one, Scythe Kronos. This gives Aguma and Bao the win they need to win the Gateway To Success Tournament. Gingka and Yuki rise from their injuries and cannot believe the power Aguma contains with Scythe Kronos. The two teams stare at each other as the tournament has ended.
115	13	"Showdown at the Tower of Babel"; Transliteration: "Taiketsu! Baberu no Tō" (Japanese: 対決! バベルの塔)	June 26, 2011	January 12, 2013 (US); May 22, 2013 (AUS)
At the Gateway to Success, after defeating Gingka and Yuki, Aguma and Bao board a helicopter and leave the tournament without even attending the award ceremony. Gingka and Yuki become confused and wonder why they left so soon. However, just before Aguma and Bao board the plane, Johannes sends a cat to spy on them. Later, Aguma and Bao get off the helicopter and start walking until they are stopped by Johannes. Johannes challenges Bao to a battle, where Johannes beats Bao easily. Johannes has an invitation for them and they accept. Meanwhile, Gingka and co are contacted by an old friend, Julian Konzern. They wonder why he contacted them while the gang plan to go to Europe to find out the reason. Elsewhere, a new tournament is starting. In a race, Bladers are challenged to climb the tower whereas on top, they will face a powerful Blader with a powerful Bey. Tsubasa is one of the many Bladers in the crowd to compete while he finds Ryuga, who is attempting to find a Legendary Blader and Kenta too as Ryuga startles the Blader DJ. The tournament begins and all the Bladers dash to the top of the tower. The Blader DJ gets confused as Ryuga just stood there and did nothing. The other bladers shoot their Beys at them. Tsubasa dodges it and launches his Earth Eagle at them, which stops them. However, he is stopped by Kenta who used Sagittario to halt Eagle. They battle with their Beys and although Kenta unleashes his full potential, he still takes a loss by Tsubasa. Tsubasa eventually makes it to the top where he finds Ryuga with his bey L-Drago Destructor. Tsubasa and Ryuga battle where Ryuga gains the advantage. Eventually, L-Drago Destructor throws Earth Eagle in a new Special Move. Tsubasa crumbles to the floor as he takes a loss. Ryuga now faces the Tower Champion but the so-called powerful Blader is left in fear at Ryuga revealed that he is simply the winner of a small tournament used to make this tournament more exciting. With this Ryuga knows he is not a Legendary Blader and is furious at this, as he crushes the Bey with his foot and destroys the Tower of Babel. Ryuga leaves with Kenta as Tsubasa asked Kenta not to go with Ryuga as he's too dangerous. Kenta isn't afraid, but asks Tsubasa not to tell Gingka about this. Meanwhile at the airport Gingka and co bid their farewell at Team Wang Hu Zhong as the Bladers board their flight to Europe, to see what Julian needs them for.
116	14	"New Team Dungeon!"; Transliteration: "Shinsei! Chīmu Danjon" (Japanese: 新生! チーム・ダンジョン)	July 3, 2011	January 19, 2013 (US); May 23, 2013 (AUS)
Aguma, who received Johannes invitation along with others, gets introduced to The Black Sun and the rest that happened to them is unknown. Elsewhere, Gingka and his friends, who visited Greece, head through ruins to find a Legendary Blader holding onto Variares, Madoka then finds out that the Blader that caused the wreckage is heading to America. Elsewhere, Masamune is "completely stoked" about the Legendary Bladers and begins intensive training with Toby and Zeo when suddenly, Tsubasa appears. Zeo and Toby show their new Beys to him and use it against him. Masamune told Tsubasa that his Striker is being modified. Just then, the coach goes out and asked Masamune how he's supposed to modifiy his bey and shows a very bad drawing. Masamune then cheers loudly for the battle in the gym which make the coach angry. He shouts at everyone for using special moves in such a small place which stops the battle between Toby, Zeo and Tsubasa leaving the battle with no outcome. Benkei, Kyoya, Yuki, Madoka and Gingka head on a plane going to America.
117	15	"Destroyer Dome"; Transliteration: "Sufia Surīshikkusuzero" (Japanese: スフィア360)	July 10, 2011	January 26, 2013 (US); May 24, 2013 (AUS)
The Destroyer Dome; the Latest stage which uses the inside of a huge sphere as a stadium, enabling 360° omnidirectional battles. For the first match, Block A group, a battle royal with ten people began. In this match Tsubasa, Toby and Zeo are participating and the opponents they should watch out for are the four Garcia siblings. However, now Selen and Enzo revolt against them en route, leaving them in a melee situation. Tobio eliminates both of the amateur Bladers. Selen is knocked out by Argo. Just as Enzo was about to be attacked, Toby and Zeo block the attack. Enzo then thanks Toby and Zeo for saving him but then turns against them because the Garcias next. Tsubasa then stops Argo from attacking Zeo. Just when it looks like Tsubasa is going to be eliminated, he goes and attacks Ray Gil but Enzo blocks him and gets eliminated. At this stage, only Tsubasa, Zeo, Toby, Argo and Ian remain. Argo then attacks Tsubasa and then Ian goes and helps Argo attack Tsubasa. Toby and Zeo help out Tsubasa, making it a 3-on-2 match. Argo and Ian combine their special attacks to try and knock out Tsubasa, while Zeo, Toby and Tsubasa combine theirs to create a huge ball of light that engulfs the stadium. Afterwards, it is shown that Ray Gil and Cyclone Herculeo are knocked out eliminating the remaining Garcia siblings. Tsubasa, Toby and Zeo are the winners of Block A. It is then showing the four Garcia siblings leaving the stadium, with them all crying, Masamune then starts crying, although it is just another of their tricks, and are in the corridor. Masamune then becomes angry, when he realizes he was tricked. Toby and Zeo cheer on Masamune who will be competing in the Block B round.
118	16	"New Striker is Complete!"; Transliteration: "Kansei! Shin Yunikoruno" (Japanese: 完成！新ユニコルノ)	July 17, 2011	February 2, 2013 (US); May 28, 2013 (AUS)
Before the B Block match, Masamune clashes with King, who boasts that he will win the tournament, and whose name Masamune doesn't believe is his real name. Furthermore, Jigsaw, a mysterious boy who despises the two of them, stirs things up between them. A battle royal which includes the three members of the Russian Team and Jack against them as so began. As all Bladers launch their beys, Blitz Striker and Variares go directly head to head. However King then attacks the Russian Team as the Masamune's three friends team up to attack Jack with a new look and Evil Befall but Jack unleashes his special move, Befall The Ripper followed by his Upper Wing spin track attack and takes out one of them. Jack then moves on to attack Jigsaw and his blade, Forbidden Ionis but his opponent blocks it with the ED145 track and attacks with a special move and Befall is knocked out. Variares then attacks Ionis but ED145 fails the attack. Masamune attacks too but the same thing happens. King unleashes Ares who attacks with his sword but Ionis dodges all those attacks. Blitz Striker then zips in between and switches to Assault Attack Mode and attacks Ionis but fails. King and Masamune then recklessly attack Ionis but it is useless against the ED145 track. Jigsaw then uses a special technique that causes his Bey to become invisible and attacks Masamune's friends. Madoka then analyzes Ionis and finds out how it is doing that by using mirages. King goes back to Striker and the two continue fighting while the Russian Team, trash talks/introduces themselves to Jigsaw who attacks Nowaguma. Lera then has Rock Scorpio attack by first having a small tornado surrounding itself then use its JB performance tip which shakes and vibrates the Destroyer Dome stadium and cancels out Jigsaw's invisible technique. She wraps it up with a new Ultimate Attack, Acid Needle, that uses Scorpio's tail which spins and sends pink round sonic-like aura's to disable his technique and succeeds. King and Masamune are very impressed as Lera brags to Jigsaw. The boy is not agitated and decides to use another special move, Burst Satellite. Striker then changes back to Barrage Attack Mode and uses its horn to create a hexagonal shield for defense. Variares switches to Defense Mode. Variares and Striker are the only survivors of Ionis's attack even though Variares and Striker survived the special move both Beys had already lost a large amount of spin. Masamune, King and Jigsaw are the winners of the Block B competitors and move onto the next part of the competition.
119	17	"I Am the Champion!"; Transliteration: "Ore-sama koso ga chanpion!" (Japanese: オレさまこそがチャンピオン！)	July 24, 2011	February 9, 2013 (US); May 29, 2013 (AUS)
It's the final round of the "Sphere 360" competition. The A Block winners Toby, Zeo, and Tsubasa are joined with the B Block winners Jigsaw, King, and Masamune to face off in the final battle royale. King and Masamune continue to fight over who will win but Jigsaw interjects claiming he'll best the both of them. Tsubasa also reminds them about Jigsaw's special move that ended the B Block round. Gingka, Yuki and Madoka are watching from the sidelines, keeping their eyes on Jigsaw whom they suspect may be a Legendary Blader while cheering for their friends. Jigsaw uses the invisible move with his Forbidden Eonis when Zeo attempts to attack him. Tsubasa then uses a new special move that cancels out the waves created by Forbidden Eonis and becomes visible again. Jigsaw goes after Tsubasa but Zeo and Toby stops him with a combined special move. However, it is not enough to defeat Jigsaw. In turn, Jigsaw launches his powerful special move. King, Masamune and Tsubasa are able to protect their Beys but Zeo and Toby are eliminated. Masamune goes after Jigsaw to avenge his friends' defeat but King cuts in and defeats Jigsaw which also begins to crack the stadium support beams. This is when Gingka, Madoka, Yuki, Masamune and Tsubasa realize that Variares is spinning to the left. Yuki, Gingka and Madoka try to figure out more about this Beyblade. It can spin either to the left or to the right and the group wonders whether there is some connection with bi-directional spinning Beyblades like Gravity Destroyer and Variares, and thought that Variares is very likely to be the basis for Gravity Destroyer. They also begin to suspect that King is the Legendary Blader and not Jigsaw whom they had previously thought might be the one. King and Masamune continue to battle it out when Tsubasa joins in. Even with the joint attacks from Masamune and Tsubasa, King is still holding strong and loving every minute of the battle. Finally, Tsubasa launches his special move and King gets so pumped from the battle, he activates his legendary power and executes his special move which ultimately defeats Tsubasa. With each special move launched by King, the stadium supports cracks even more and finally breaks. The Sphere rolls out of the stadium and Masamune and King run along inside while still battling. However, they are also able to exchange mutual admiration towards each other and King tells him how he got his Bey when following a shooting star one night. The Sphere finally rolls into a body of water and the two Bladers amicably battle to see who is number one. Ultimately, King is the winner and his hair returns to its normal color. Meanwhile, Gingka, Yuki and Madoka catches up with them in time to see the two Bladers laughing. Tsubasa catches up to them. Masamune calls King a Legendary Blader. King while not comprehending why, jovially accepts the title. Masamune then asks him his real name, but he angrily insists that it is "King".
120	18	"Maze of Mist Mountain"; Transliteration: "Misuto Maunten no meikyū" (Japanese: ミストマウンテンの迷宮)	July 31, 2011	February 16, 2013 (US); May 30, 2013 (AUS)
Gingka and co arrived in Africa where a Fragment of the Star is said to have fallen. Their destination is the Mist Mountain, named the "Mountain of No Return". With the help of Nile and Demure, Gingka and co arrived at the Mist Mountain, only to see a huge maze in front of them. Using his map, Nile leads them through the maze. Johannes, Aguma and his followers follow Gingka and co through the maze at a safe distance. After walking a long distance, Gingka and co take a break. Madoka accidentally placed her hand on the wall, triggering a trap hole below her. Quickly Gingka managed to grab her, preventing her from falling into the darkness. After pulling her out, Gingka himself triggered a trap and fell to a ground with nearly complete darkness. Gingka still manages to send them a message. Gingka told them that he saw something bright in the darkness and wanted to investigate. At first, his friends were reluctant, but had given in to Gingka. They told him that they will be proceeding on with the maze and asked him to take care. Gingka ran towards the bright light, just when the pillars on the sides collapsed. He finds a stranger, who is looking for something. Gingka went up to him and wanted to talk to him. He thought that Gingka was trying to stop him from searching for his treasures and challenged him to a Bey battle. Gingka readily accepted. It was an intense battle as both Bladers used their special moves against one another. The battle ended with huge explosion near the others location. A mysterious Bey flew straight towards them and landed on the ground Spinning. It was followed by Pegasus flying out from the dust caused by the explosion and sleeping out. Gingka jumped out and grab his Bey. His friends were stunned as they could not believe Gingka managed to have a Bey battle even if he was trapped. The stranger ran forward and catch his Bey, Omega Dragonis. It was then when he first introduced himself as Ryuto, claiming to be a treasure hunter. He decides to assist the group on their quest.
121	19	"The Lion's Pride"; Transliteration: "Shishi no puraido" (Japanese: 獅子のプライド)	August 7, 2011	February 23, 2013 (US); May 31, 2013 (AUS)
After adding Ryuto to their group, Gingka and co. move on with their journey. They arrive at the mouth of Mist Mountain. As the name suggests, there is thick dense mist everywhere which slowly engulfs them. Gingka and co start to panic but Kyoya launches his bey and creates tornado which clears the mist and reveals a huge entrance. As they proceed through the entrance, Johannes and Aguma follows the group. Gingka and his friends arrive at a fork in the path and do not know which way to go. Ryuto notices the statues eyes seem to point the way and tests the corridor for traps with his Bey. It is safe and he takes the path on the right. Gingka and co follow him. Ryuto arrives at the next junction and quickly takes the path on the left, following the statues eyes they arrive at the third junction which has three doorways but Ryuto realizes something is not right about the path the eyes are pointing to this time. Benkei does not take heed, he decides to take the path the eyes are pointing to. Ryuto tries to stop him and warns him that it could be a trap. As Benkei tries to enter through the doorway, a gate begins to fall but he manages to stop the gate long enough to free himself from danger. The gate closes all the way and then reopens. Kyoya observes that when the wooden gate had sealed the path, the statue's eyes had moved into another direction and mentions this to group. Ryuto and Kyoya both agree that the path on the left is the correct way. Throughout the maze in Mist Mountain, Johannes, Aguma, Bao and their followers continue to follow at a safe distance from Gingka and friends. Ryuto suddenly stops but Gingka is unable to stop in time and slides down a slope. Gingka and co realize they have reached an ancient Bey Stadium. They see an enormous stone gate and try to figure out how to open it. Kyoya realizes they are being followed and launches his bey causing an explosion in the corridor that they previously had entered from. Johannes and Aguma come out, coughing. Gingka and co are shocked to see them here. Johannes was also looking for Legendary Bladers. Kyoya demands a rematch between him and Aguma. He has not forgotten his loss during the match in China. Anger ignites between Kyoya and Aguma and a heated battle soon commences. The stone door opens as a result. Ryuto runs towards the door but Johannes launches his bey to stop him. Nile takes charge and orders Demure and Benkei to take a defensive position to block Johannes, Bao, and their followers. He then tells Gingka, Madoka, Yuki and Ryuto to go ahead. Ryuto runs ahead and Gingka is reluctant to leave them but ultimately follows Ryuto, leaving them behind. The battle between Kyoya and Aguma intensifies as they both use special moves against one another. Aguma provokes Kyoya calling him Gingka's follower in disgust. At first, Nile, Benkei and Demure are losing their battle, but through teamwork of special moves and renewed sense of determination, they manage to defeat Johannes, Bao and his followers. They rush to join in Kyoya's battle but are stopped by Kyoya. He is very determined to defeat Aguma by himself and threatens them not to interfere. Kyoya returns to his battle and beats Aguma in the end. When the battle has ended, the stone door starts to close. Kyoya, Nile, Benkei, and Demure manage to get through the doorway before it closes while Johannes, Aguma, Bao, and their followers are trapped on the other side. As they make their way to catch up to Gingka, Kyoya is brooding over what Aguma said about being Gingka's follower.
122	20	"Guardian of the Temple, Dynamis"; Transliteration: "Shinden no shugosha Dyunamisu" (Japanese: 神殿の守護者デュナミス)	August 14, 2011	March 2, 2013 (US); June 4, 2013 (AUS)
Gingka launches Cosmic Pegasus through a wall and breaks it, leaving a path out of the labyrinth. Suddenly they hear a mysterious voice and the dull, grey clouds come apart to reveal a clear blue sky and ruins, which are set up similarly to Stonehenge. Gingka then notices the temple behind it, which has a large, black door. Gingka then bangs on the door several times before preparing to launch Pegasus at the door, until Ryuto stops him. Ryuto then notices strange writing on the door, which Madoka uses her laptop to try and analyse it, but to no avail. They decide to look around the Stonehenge, when a yellow snake appears out of nowhere and scares Yuki. Ryuto then notices a small hole in one of the stones and looks through it, wondering what caused the hole, which prompts Ryuto to put Omega Dragonis near the hole. Benkei, Kyoya, Nile, and Demure all come out of the labyrinth, to which Benkei gives out a huge sigh of relief. They then notice Gingka trying to move one of the stones to no avail. Gingka then gets frustrated when he cannot move and kicks it, only to hurt his foot and hop up and down. Gingka then turns around and notices Kyoya and the others. Kyoya then prepares to launch Fang Leone at one of the stones but Gingka attempts to stop him, but Kyoya still launches Leone at the stone, but it rebounds off it and rebounds onto the stones around it and back onto the stone Kyoya hit and then rebounds towards them and they start running, which Ryuto and Yuki notice. Leone ends up breaking one of the stones, and Ryuto gets angry at them. Gingka and Kyoya start shouting at each other, which makes Madoka really angry and starts shouting at them. They are then seen at the temple door to try and figure it out and Madoka walks up to the door and concentrates and says something to open the door, which doesn't work. Later, Yuki looks up at the sky and notices the Cygnus constellation, and then runs back down the steps, and up to the top of a pile of fallen stones. Gingka and Ryuto then follow him. Ryuto then takes out a booklet and a pen and draws the Cygnus stick figure down in it which reveals that Stonehenge is in the shape of the Cygnus constellation. They then find the stone with a hole in it and Yuki launches Mercury Anubis through it and goes through stones with holes in them and the top of them light up, revealing the Cygnus constellation. Then a light consumes the door, and the door opens and they proceed through the door to find a shadowy figure sitting on a chair, who reveals himself to be Dynamis. In front of them is a stadium with the 12 Star Signs on it. Dynamis then reveals his Bey, Jade Jupiter, he challenges one of them to a battle, to which Kyoya accepts, but, as he is about to launch, Ryuto launches instead. Madoka then analyses Jade Jupiter on her computer, Ryuto then changes modes, and soon after, the metal balls in Jade move inward, later the balls in Jade move back outward. Dynamis then uses his special move to defeat Ryuto.
123	21	"The Legend of Nemesis' Revival"; Transliteration: "Nemeshisu, fukkatsu no densetsu" (Japanese: ネメシス、復活の伝説)	August 21, 2011	March 9, 2013 (US); June 5, 2013 (AUS)
Ryuto, who searched for the Fragment of the Star as if it was Treasure, is defeated by Dynamis without it growing into a tough fight. At that moment, Yuki and Gingka put themselves forward for the next challenge. Then, Dynamis, who has taken heed of Pegasus, accepts Gingka's challenge and a battle ensued once again. When Gingka attacks daringly, Dynamis sees through it and took measures against it. Having been driven into a predicament, Gingka, however, displays the results of hard work learnt from his previous defeats and goes all-out but Dynamis stops the battle in the midway and reveals the story of Nemesis' legend and Gingka and others come to know about another Legendary Blader called Tithi.
124	22	"The Four Season Bladers"; Transliteration: "Shiki no Burēdā" (Japanese: 四季の戦士(ブレーダー))	August 28, 2011	March 16, 2013 (US); June 6, 2013 (AUS)
The reason why the radiance of the Star lies within Pegasus and Leone was because it had been established that their power dwells in the constellations which govern the Four Seasons, in order to face the threat of Nemesis. Not only are Gingka and his friends astonished by this new fact, but so are Johannes and the others. However, Aguma, who hasn't decided his fate after his battle against Kyoya, attacks Gingka and his friends so that he can steal the radiance of the Star and use it as his own power.
125	23	"The Battle of Beyster Island"; Transliteration: "Beisutā tō no tatakai" (Japanese: ベイスター島の戦い)	September 4, 2011	March 23, 2013 (US); June 7, 2013 (AUS)
In order to confirm whether the Legendary Blader who governs another season of the Four Seasons Masamune, Gingka, and his friends participate in the "Beyster Island Championships". However, as Johannes and the others also do the same thing. Ryuga also appears on a thunderbolt for the same reason. Gingka spots one with exact resemblance to Kenta and follows him. Fierce battles commence at each place at the beginning of the tournament. Starting with Gingka, Yuki and Benkei and the others smoothly win and advance to the next round as well. And importantly, Masamune clashes with Bao of the Beylin Fist. Furthermore, at a different location, Aguma and King collide, it's a showdown of Solar System beys. But, as all these battles are happening, Gingka is looking for Kenta. Back to the battles of Aguma and King, they use their best they have to offer and Aguma loses after a grueling match, however Masamune defeats Bao quite easily.
126	24	"Two Big, Fierce Battles!"; Transliteration: "Gekiretsu! Ni Dai Batoru" (Japanese: 激烈!二大バトル)	September 11, 2011	March 30, 2013 (US); June 11, 2013 (AUS)
127	25	"The Unseen Opponent"; Transliteration: "Sugatanaki Burēdā" (Japanese: 姿なき対戦者（ブレーダー）)	September 18, 2011	April 6, 2013 (US); June 12, 2013 (AUS)
As the Beyster Island Tournament comes to a close Toby and Zeo find themselves defeated at the hands of a mysterious blader who doesn't show his face. Masamune arrives and hears the story. He becomes determined to battle this blader at the final stage and runs full speed to it. Shortly, he discovers the final stage and ends up battling a blader who goes by the name of Chris and his bey Phantom Orion. The battle is tough. Masamune fights with all his might and hits Orion high up in the air and uses his special move but amazingly his bey takes no damage at all. He is then surrounded by dark power and uses his special move that knocks Masamune and Striker out and Chris is revealed as another of the Legendary Bladers by Gingka and co.
128	26	"Orion's Whereabouts"; Transliteration: "Orion no yukue" (Japanese: オリオンの行方)	September 25, 2011	April 13, 2013 (US); July 5, 2013 (AUS)
129	27	"The Lion in the Wilderness (Part 1)"; Transliteration: "Arano o iku shishi" (Japanese: 荒野を行く獅子)	October 2, 2011	April 20, 2013 (US); June 13, 2013 (AUS)
During his travels, Kyoya undertakes the extermination of a monster that is causing trouble by using a bey. Having headed to the mountain recesses where the monster is said to have emerged. Kyoya encounters a shadowy object behind some mist in the mountains. Both launch their beys. Kyoya creates a tornado, blowing the mist away and revealing the figure: Yu Tendo. Kyoya is surprised he calls back his bey. Yu has just spotted a new bey. He runs up to Kyoya and snatches his Fang Leone from him and looks at it. Kyoya snatches it back. Kyoya walks away but Yu follows then stops him in his tracks. Yu shakes his hand. Kyoya isn't amused. Kyoya then pulls his hand away. Yu makes a Bey stadium using Libra. The two Bladers start a battle. But watching their battle from behind a crumbled wall is someone wearing a mask.
130	28	"The Lion in the Wilderness (Part 2)"; Transliteration: "Monsutā no shōtai" (Japanese: 怪物の正体)	October 9, 2011	April 20, 2013 (US); June 13, 2013 (AUS)
Kyoya ends up battling with Yu. The monster, provoked by their intensifying battle, attacks suddenly but then flees into a maze of stone walls, Kyoya and Yu run after it but the monster knows the maze well and teases them when it can. The monster flees but this time, Yu and Kyoya launch their beys, Fang Leone and Flame Libra at two places in one wall behind which the monster is running. The wall collapses and traps the monster in its tracks. The monster runs another way but once again, the wall bricks collapse. Kyoya and Yu approach the monster, Kyoya yells at it and in fear, the monster takes off its large mask, revealing it to be a small boy. The small boy's name is Tithi, Yu befriends Tithi immediately.
131	29	"The God of Venus: Quetzalcoatl (Part 1)"; Transliteration: "Kinseishin Ketsuarukoatoru" (Japanese: 金星神ケツァルコアトル)	October 16, 2011	April 27, 2013 (US); June 14, 2013 (AUS)
132	30	"The God of Venus: Quetzalcoatl (Part 2)"; Transliteration: "Nemeshisu no kodō" (Japanese: ネメシスの鼓動)	October 23, 2011	April 27, 2013 (US); June 14, 2013 (AUS)
Kyoya challenges Tithi to a battle in order to defeat the Legendary Blader. However, Yu, who couldn't just watch Tithi fight against his will without doing anything, intervenes and the battle is suspended. Later on, Yu contacts Gingka that he found the 9th Legendary Blader which was Tithi hiding behind the mask. Meanwhile, a secret-maneuvering Pluto commences the revival ritual of Nemesis, the God of Destruction using the power of the three Star Fragment Beys he has obtained in his team.
133	31	"The God of Destruction's Revival! (Part 1)"; Transliteration: "Hakaishin, fukkatsu!?" (Japanese: 破壊神、復活！？)	October 30, 2011	May 4, 2013 (US); June 18, 2013 (AUS)
Somewhere, Johannes, Bao, Aguma, and Chris are led by Pluto to a dark cave where they meet a dark version of Dynamis. Right there, Pluto and Dynamis use a dark power that uses dark energy from Jupiter, Kronos, and Orion that when used together, split the ground apart and cause a Stadium in the lava to appear, and in that Stadium, lies the early version of Nemesis: Proto Nemesis. Pluto tells them that only non-Legendary Bladers have the ability to pick up and use Proto Nemesis. Bao decides to go into the Stadium and see Proto Nemesis for himself and as he grabs it, Proto Nemesis flings Bao against a wall, showing that Proto Nemesis is, indeed, a threat. The others launch their Beys in order to test Proto Nemesis' power. Despite this however, Proto Nemesis keeps taking the hits and is unaffected, keeps spinning as if nothing has happened, and for some strange reason, Nemesis seemed to always be drawn to the center of the stadium. This repeated over and over, until the bladers realize that Nemesis is filled with bewildering dark power. In one final clash, the Beasts of Jupiter, Kronos, and Orion appear and as they attack Proto Nemesis, But Nemesis releases so much dark power so that they lose and Proto Nemesis keeps spinning. They are amazed at this Bey as they cannot believe the power Proto Nemesis holds. Gingka and co talk to Ryo and Hikaru via webcam and find out a presence is happening to their Beys. Gingka's Cosmic Pegasus and King's Variares are glowing with their corresponding Legendary colour due to Proto Nemesis sending a seismic wave of Legendary power. Ryo tells them that Nemesis has been resurrected and is up to them to defeat Nemesis once and for all. The gang then run to begin their adventure to stop Nemesis. Meanwhile, somewhere near a waterfall, a man with a cane in a top hat and a gold streak of hair opens a gate that reveals a group of men, and one of those men, will be the owner of Nemesis.
134	32	"The God of Destruction's Revival! (Part 2)"; Transliteration: "Sajitario no ichigeki" (Japanese: サジタリオの一撃)	November 6, 2011	May 4, 2013 (US); June 18, 2013 (AUS)
The sinister power of Proto Nemesis affected L-Drago too. In order to stop Ryuga from drawing himself towards the forces of darkness again, Kenta challenges him to a battle. No matter how many times he is beaten by Ryuga, Kenta stands up for the sake of Gingka, and for his friends. And then, having become injured all over his body, he finally delivers a Special Spin Move with all his might to L-Drago. Despite this, Kenta is still no match for Ryuga as L-Drago defeats Sagittario by digging it into a rock. However, L-Drago's Face Bolt has become cracked as a result. In a helicopter, Gingka and his friends are flying to an ancient temple.
135	33	"The Child of Nemesis (Part 1)"; Transliteration: "Nemeshisu no mōshigo" (Japanese: 黒き太陽（ネメシス）の申し子)	November 13, 2011	May 11, 2013 (US); June 19, 2013 (AUS)
Through a helicopter, Gingka and the gang; Yuki, Madoka, King, Masamune, Benkei, Toby, and Zeo are rushing to the ancient ruins where inside, the dark energy of Proto Nemesis was given off and had affected all of the Legendary Bladers' Beys. Cosmic Pegasus was glowing with its aura due to this, leading the gang to the ruins. While inside the ruins, the dark energy of Proto Nemesis continues, as if it will never stop. Pluto gazes at this and is enjoying the power of Proto Nemesis. However Chris and Aguma try to pull themselves together after their incredible loss to Proto Nemesis. Pluto tells them that soon Gingka and the others will arrive in response to the dark energy. Just then, the mysterious person with a walking cane arrives at the scene. He tells them that he knows about Gingka and the others. Aguma reacts and attempts to assault him with his Bey, but Johannes reassures him that everything is fine. The man tells Pluto that he has brought along people with him. He has brought along with him, and the three Nemesis Bladers: Herschel, Keyser, and Cycnus. The three reveal their Beyblades with Herschel owning Duo Uranus, Keyser owning a Bakushin Beelzebub, and Cycnus owning Kreis Cygnus. Rago then out of nowhere, uses his power to control the dark energy of Proto Nemesis which increases it and made it more powerful. Dynamis starts to choke as the energy is too much while Pluto becomes excited when he has found the worthy Child of Nemesis, Rago. Meanwhile, Gingka and co. arrive at the ruins but just when they attempt to enter it, Beat Lynx subdues them as Johannes, Bao, and the Temple Bladers arrive. They want to stop Gingka and the others from entering the ruins as they attack them. With Toby fighting Johannes and Zeo fighting Bao. Benkei then joins in the fight as his Dark Bull stampedes over the Temple Bladers' Beys. Toby and Zeo tell Gingka and the others to enter the temple while they handle Johannes and Bao. Then, the Temple Bladers gather their Beys onto Dark Bull but Benkei unleashes his full potential and drives them away with full force. Gingka and the others get ready to enter the temple. Johannes then switches Beat Lynx to a higher height to stop the others but Zeo's Spiral Fox knocks Hell Crown over it rams Beat Lynx by accident. They then handle the Temple Bladers' Beys while Johannes and Bao think of a plan. Elsewhere, inside the temple, Yuki's Anubius glows which leads them inside a maze of stairs of the ruins. Benkei then spots Yu in a helicopter who tells him that Kyoya and Tithi are with him. Benkei is excited at this but then turns sad when land at the top of the ruins, not able to aid them in battle. Gingka and the others are then stopped when they encounter none of than Aguma. Aguma wants to stop them from stopping Nemesis' revival and launches Scythe Kronos at him but just as Gingka gets ready to launch Pegasus, Yuki intercepts and launches Anubius. Yuki plots to defeat Aguma once and for all and to have nothing stand in his way. Aguma does not see Yuki as any threat though as their Beys clash in battle. Each clash gives Proto Nemesis even more energy. Just then, Gingka and the others are spotted by Dark Dynamis. Gingka is surprised at how Dynamis has turned over to aid Nemesis and cannot believe his eyes. Dynamis assures Gingka that he will defeat him with all his might which gives Gingka off.
136	34	"The Child of Nemesis (Part 2)"; Transliteration: "Hadesu no jubaku" (Japanese: ハデスの呪縛)	November 20, 2011	May 11, 2013 (US); June 19, 2013 (AUS)
Having looked sideways at the battle between Aguma and Yuki, Dynamis challenged Gingka to a battle. Masamune is much eager to face him as well, so he launches Blitz Striker to face off against Dynamis. Suddenly he along with King are completely hindered by the new Nemesis Bladers, who suddenly appeared. Amidst the mayhem Kyoya, Yu, and Tithi showed up to break through the wall, interrupting all three battles.
137	35	"Four Hearts (Part 1)"; Transliteration: "Yottsu no Tamashii" (Japanese: 四つの心)	November 27, 2011	May 18, 2013 (US); June 20, 2013 (AUS)
While Kyoya battles with Dynamis and Tithi battles with Aguma respectively, having heard the words of Dynamis, who regained his true character just for some moment, Gingka and Madoka leaves behind and hurries towards the inside of the ruins. It was one of the necessary requirements to stop the Nemesis. That was, to make the spirits of the Bladers of the Four Seasons become one.
138	36	"Four Hearts (Part 2)"; Transliteration: "Ginga Bāsasu Kurisu" (Japanese: 銀河VSクリス)	December 4, 2011	May 18, 2013 (US); June 20, 2013 (AUS)
As the fierce fighting between the Legendary Bladers continued, Gingka falls into a predicament when he receives a fierce attack from Chris. However, in his battle with Chris, he saw through the fact that he was not putting in his passionate Bey Spirit. Chris, who left the front stage still lonely as his companion was unable to compete together with him as a consequence of him being too strong, was unable to have hope in his bey.
139	37	"Come Together, Legendary Bladers! (Part 1)"; Transliteration: "Shūketsu! Rejiendo Burēdā" (Japanese: 集結!レジェンドブレーダー)	December 11, 2011	May 25, 2013 (US); June 21, 2013 (AUS)
In order to persuade Chris to bring back his friends and make him switch sides, Gingka unfolds a battle. In the next moment, when their Special Moves clashed, Gingka, who was hurled into a mysterious space, then learns about Chris's tragic past.
140	38	"Come Together, Legendary Bladers! (Part 2)"; Transliteration: "Zeusu no kekkai" (Japanese: ゼウスの結界)	December 18, 2011	May 25, 2013 (US); June 21, 2013 (AUS)
In order to create a new world, one must destroy this world. Having obtained Proto Nemesis, which has accumulated power, Rago unleashes that power on Gingka and the others. Gingka fights against him along with Kyoya and others. The other Legendary Bladers gather, and Ryuga unexpectedly barges in using L-Drago Destructor. This episode also marks the return of Doji, the main antagonist of Metal Fusion, his first appearance in the anime since Metal Fusion Episode 48. Doji reveals in this episode that the awakening of L Drago (which took place before the events of Metal Fusion Episode 1), and the abuse of Spiral Force near the end of Metal Masters were all planned to assist in the awakening of Nemesis. Pluto also reveals that he, a descendant of King Hades, was controlling Hades Inc. from behind the scenes. This is where his bey's Japanese name, Fusion Hades, was derived from. The Legendary Bladers of the Four Seasons, who gathered unexpectedly, appeared to pin down Nemesis using a barrier, known as Zeus' Barrier, but then Ryuga gets out of the circle and starts to absorb Proto Nemesis' power but fails due to Nemesis reversing the effect and evolves into Diablo Nemesis.
141	39	"Diablo Nemesis (Part 1)"; Transliteration: "Deiaburo Nemeshisu" (Japanese: ディアブロネメシス)	December 25, 2011	June 1, 2013 (US); June 25, 2013 (AUS)
The episode starts with the aftermath of the previous battle, with Diablo Nemesis being born. Rago calls its power and the Gang are sent flying again, except for Gingka, who stands up and protests. Rago stops as both Bladers load their Beys and launch. Cosmic Pegasus gets off to a good start, overpowering Nemesis. Pegasus changes to Upper Attack Mode and deals more and more blows each time. Nemesis then begins not to budge at all, much to Gingka's disappointment. Nemesis changes its X Drive Tip to XF and begins attacking Pegasus, who stands there helpless. Gingka tries a counter attack, but Nemesis' Beast emits from its Bey and takes the form of an evil version of Pegasus. Pluto states that Nemesis has the power of the nine Legendary Beys, allowing it to do so. The Gang cannot sit there any longer and watch, so Yu announces that they should all launch their Beys to help Gingka, who seemed to be losing the battle. Kyoya, Yuki, King, Chris, Dynamis, Tithi, and Masamune all launch their Beys, while Aguma and Ryuga do not. Nemesis takes the form of each of their Beasts and knocks them back. Doji begins to taunt Ryuga once more for helping Gingka in the first place, annoying Ryuga deeply. Doji goes on to provoke him further by telling Ryuga that he caused the rise of Nemesis and was only a tool in the plan, again, annoying Ryuga further. Ryuga, enraged by Doji, launches L-Drago Destructor, creating a "wall of fire" in its path. Ryuga states that his "Dragon Spirit" is awake and orders L-Drago to attack Nemesis. Similar to the others, Nemesis takes the form of "L-Drago" and counter attacks, sending the real L-Drago backwards. Rago calls his Special Move, Armageddon, which begins to destroy The Mayan Ruins. Elsewhere, Hikaru and Ryo notice the extreme energy levels and send the WBBA Squads and Tsubasa to help everyone. Back at the temple, Gingka and his Gang call back their Beys and make a hasty retreat to avoid being crushed by the temple. Ryuga refuses to leave, annoyed with Doji. Kenta clings to Ryuga's arm, begging him to leave, but he doesn't and the Temple collapses. The WBBA Squads arrive outside, along with Tsubasa, and help Benkei, Zeo and Toby. Tsubasa runs over to the Temple entrance, where Gingka and his Group have been sealed in. Tsubasa launches Earth Eagle and clears the path for everyone. It is too late though, as the Temple crashes down and disappears due to Nemesis' Special Move, leaving everyone lying on the floor fainted, except for Tsubasa. The episode ends with Tsubasa screaming over the state of everyone.
142	40	"Diablo Nemesis (Part 2)"; Transliteration: "Hoshi no kizuna" (Japanese: 星の絆)	January 8, 2012	June 1, 2013 (US); June 25, 2013 (AUS)
At the WBBA HQ Ryo, Hikaru, Tsubasa, Yuki, and Madoka look at a screen of the world. They look at the presence created by Diablo Nemesis, as it is growing stronger in North America, Central America, and South America. They become worried as a result, as they fear the dark power Nemesis holds. Elsewhere at the HQ, the Legendary Bladers and Kenta, are all around. After the massive battle that took place previously at the temple which was destroyed by Diablo Nemesis, everyone had seemed to lose hope in themselves, and each other. Tired, the Bladers remember what took place during the battle, and felt as it Nemesis was unbeatable. But some did not despair, as they believed that their strong bonds and feelings for wanting a bright future, will become the strength of their Beys. With this, it has started to give them hope as well as determination. The Bladers eventually decided to go through some training, in order to prepare for their next battle with Nemesis, and will use their maximum potential this time. As the rest of the Legendary Bladers left, leaving only Gingka, Madoka, Kenta, and Dynamis. Gingka decided to go train with Kenta asks Dynamis would he like to come with them, but he declined. Telling him that he needs to go talk with someone, about something important. Meanwhile at another place at the HQ, Aguma, Bao, and their Bladers are sitting around with Bao angry at the fact of the huge power Nemesis holds, starting that they will have to train much more harder if they are to be on Nemesis' side. Though Aguma is skeptical on this but just then, Dynamis drops by. Dynamis tells Aguma a story of his ancestor. That long ago, Aguma's ancestor fought alongside Nemesis just like he was now. But through determination and bonds, Aguma's ancestor was able to be with his true side, his fellow Legendary Bladers. Dynamis tells Aguma that he wishes he will do the same as his ancestor, and be with the Legendary Bladers. As Dynamis leaves, Aguma thinks about this and wants to make a fresh determination in response. At training, as Gingka and Kenta are battling with their Beys, with Gingka gaining upper-hand, Kenta thinks for a moment. He thinks of what happened to Ryuga, as he last saw him in the temple while it was being destroyed by Diablo Nemesis' Special Spin Move, Armageddon. Kenta wonders, and hopes that Ryuga is okay where ever he is. Somewhere at a mountain, Ryuga is undergoing massive training as he wants to be powerful enough to take on Diablo Nemesis. He then thinks of Doji's taunts at him, the ones that enraged him with so much anger. Ryuga turns furious, and continues his training. With his goal: to destroy Diablo Nemesis, no matter the cost.
143	41	"To The Final Battle Ground (Part 1)"; Transliteration: "Kessen no chi e" (Japanese: 決戦の地へ)	January 15, 2012	June 8, 2013 (US); June 26, 2013 (AUS)
While Gingka and the others prepare for their next battle, repeating their intensive training in order to increase the power of their Star Fragments, Nemesis is infused with power by Rago and it finally starts to cause unusual phenomena worldwide. Having discovered Nemesis' whereabouts based on the data observed from the Cosmos that was sent by Aleksei and co. from Russia, Gingka and the others try to head out to their headquarters so that they can prevent a disaster this time round, but...
144	42	"To The Final Battle Ground (Part 2)"; Transliteration: "Michibikareshi Sadame" (Japanese: 導かれし運命（さだめ）)	January 22, 2012	June 8, 2013 (US); June 26, 2013 (AUS)
Gingka and the others are locked in a melee at the heliport when Johannes and Co. showed up to interfere. When it became a critical moment in which they are forced into a defensive battle, Aguma takes part in the fight. Rejecting Johannes and Co., he decides to fight together with Gingka and the others as one of the Legendary Bladers. But in the meantime, the moment of the God of Destruction's revival was drawing near.
145	43	"The Lost Kingdom (Part 1)"; Transliteration: "Ushinawareta ōkoku" (Japanese: 失われた王国)	January 29, 2012	June 15, 2013 (US); June 27, 2013 (AUS)
The episode begins continuing from the previous one with Pluto's evil laugh at the Kingdom rising up. Rago launches Nemesis into a Stadium and begins exerting "Dark Energy", causing abnormal weather and natural disasters to occur worldwide. News channels are shown to be alerting citizens of countries. In the helicopter, King asks Madoka about the location of the power source. Hikaru provides a report about it and shocks Tsubasa with the location. Dynamis explains that an old underwater shrine lurks there and that it may have been Pluto's plan to raise it up in the first place. Hikaru explains that strange wind patterns and whirlpools surround the temple, making it harder for the Bladers to get close. She also provides an analysis file on Diablo Nemesis' stats and mechanics. Lightning hits the helicopter and the lights go out, causing steering to somewhat become harder. The problem doesn't end there as unexpected turbulence pushes the helicopter off course. The turbulence rocks the helicopter enough to throw Masamune, Yu, and Kenta out of the backroom and into the main cabin, annoying both Gingka and Kyoya. Aguma attempts to scare the trio with lightning but they appear to be determined to stay and help. Lightning strikes once again, throwing the helicopter completely off-course and out of control as smoke begins emitting from the rotor blades. Tsubasa flees to the cargo bay and opens the hatch, dropping all the cargo to attempt to increase speed and control. This doesn't work and the helicopter crash-lands on an island. Gingka and Kyoya exclaim how the island is the same one they battled on before. Madoka checks the distance away from the target and states that they're close. King and Masamune jump with excitement and run, along with everyone else, towards the speedboats dropped from the helicopter before the crash. Kenta is unsure but Gingka reassures him that everything will be fine and that he's glad he came, motivating Kenta to continue. Ryuga is seen observing Nemesis' power from afar, gritting his teeth at it. Rago continues to release power and cause major disturbances. Ryuga bursts through a wall with the power of L-Drago, much to Pluto, Rago and Doji's dismay. Doji proceeds to provoke him, but Ryuga ignores him and challenges Rago to a battle, grabbing his Bey and Launcher to prepare for battle. Pluto commands Rago to accept the challenge. Rago withdraws Diablo Nemesis in order to re-launch, stopping the harsh weather conditions and mass power outbreak. Rago and Ryuga launch their beys ending the episode.
146	44	"The Lost Kingdom (Part 2)"; Transliteration: "Nemeshisu Bāsasu Erudorago" (Japanese: 破壊神(ネメシス) VS竜皇(エルドラゴ))	February 5, 2012	June 15, 2013 (US); June 27, 2013 (AUS)
The match between Nemesis and L-Drago, who appeared to be evenly matched, turned into a one-sided trampling down which lead to Nemesis making a serious effort. L-Drago, who boasted of being the strongest, is overwhelmed by Nemesis and Ryuga falls into an unprecedented predicament. Despite having wounds over his body, Ryuga puts winning or losing at stake with an Ultimate Spin Move in which he put his heart and soul into. However, it appears that Nemesis' power exceeds even that.
147	45	"The Missing Star of the Four Seasons (Part 1)"; Transliteration: "Kaketa shiki no seiza" (Japanese: 欠けた四季の星座)	February 12, 2012	June 22, 2013 (US); June 28, 2013 (AUS)
The Dragon Emperor, who was boasted of being the strongest, fell and any means of stopping the God of Destruction were lost. Rago emerges victorious. Gingka and the others don't give up and challenge him to a battle, but Nemesis, who had obtained the power of all the Fragments of the Star, repels their attacks. Then, in agreement with Aguma's proposal, they stop Nemesis' counterattacks one by one. And finally, they put winning or losing at stake with Pegasus' Special Move. Will a single blow with all their might get through!?
148	46	"The Missing Star of the Four Seasons (Part 2)"; Transliteration: "Tsugareshi hikari" (Japanese: 継がれし光)	February 19, 2012	June 22, 2013 (US); June 28, 2013 (AUS)
The episode continues where the previous one left off with Diablo Nemesis attacking each and every one of the Legendary Blader's beys. Each of the Legendary Bladers is sent flying backwards as well. Masamune, Tsubasa, and Yu will not stand for this and get Striker, Eagle, and Libra to attack Nemesis which ultimately fails as they are sent flying backwards as well. Gingka, Kyoya, Aguma, and King all stand up again and order Pegasus, Leone, Kronos, and Variares to attack Nemesis, only for it to fail yet again and get them sent flying back against the walls. Each of the Legendary Bladers are in terrible states as they struggle to get the strength to even lift their heads up. Dynamis loses hope, exclaiming that it's useless to fight and he was one of the Bladers of the Seasons needed to seal Nemesis away. Rago then unleashes huge amount of Dark Power from Nemesis, causing severe weather problems and the entire Earth to go black. Lava comes out of the ground in front of Nile and Demure as they watch. Volcanoes erupt around Team Excalibur as they watch them erupt. Pillars around the Beylin Temple crumble as Team Wang Hu Zhong watch their temple slowly crumble around them. Ryo and Hikaru watch all the disasters happening on the WBBA computer. The Legendary Bladers are amazed by the power, but Gingka still refuses to allow it to happen as he orders Pegasus to attack once more. Pegasus is sent flying even further backwards than before as Pluto and Rago laugh. The Legendary Bladers collapse as they have lost their hope that they had built up. All hope appears to be lost. Kenta begins reminiscing about his journey since he met Gingka, how he stood up to the Face Hunters, how they participated in the Survival Battle, how they all set out to enter Battle Bladers and the friends they met on their way, how they met Masamune as a Persistent Challenger and ended up winning the World Championships, and even his journey alongside Ryuga. Kenta orders Sagittario to attack Nemesis, but fails like the others. He believes that there is still hope somewhere as he attacks again and again, constantly failing each time, causing him to collapse with Gingka shouting at him in the background. Kenta flashbacks to his journey with Ryuga once more, how no matter how many times he collapsed, he'd always persist and continue. With this, Kenta stands up once again. Ryuga begins moving his hand and picks up L-Drago. Kenta uses his special move Flame Claw, which fails just as any other one of his attack has. Nemesis uppercuts Sagittario, causing it to shatter slightly and Kenta to collapse once more. Madoka runs over to Kenta to try to help him, but Nemesis uses its power to send her flying backwards. Masamune, Tsubasa, and Yu attack once more for Kenta and Madoka's sake, but fail once again. Kenta stands up once again as everyone becomes worried for him. Nemesis begins charging at Sagittario, but Ryuga stands up and launches L-Drago towards Sagittario, saying that Kenta is his friend. A link begins between L-Drago and Sagittario as the Star Fragment is transferred. L-Drago Destructor then disintegrates in the same manner as Storm Pegasus, much to Kenta's shock. Kenta turns around to see that Ryuga has also vanished. A distraught Kenta then fires up his Blader Spirit Sagittario's flame wheel evolves into Flash and his Track/Tip extend into 230WD. Then Kenta turns around to Rago and tells him he is going down. Gingka exclaims that Kenta has replaced Ryuga as a Legendary Blader and taken his place as a Blader of the Seasons, giving them hope once again. Kenta doesn't react at being a Legendary Blader and orders Sagittario to charge at Nemesis.
149	47	"Flash Sagittario (Part 1)"; Transliteration: "Furashu Sajitario" (Japanese: フラッシュサジタリオ)	February 26, 2012	June 29, 2013 (US); July 2, 2013 (AUS)
The power of the Star Fragment that was passed on to Kenta by Ryuga, who should have died, evolved Flame Sagittario into Flash Sagittario. With the Bladers of the Four Seasons all together, Rago could not hide his shock at Gingka and the others, who went on the counteroffensive. At that moment, Pluto, who absolutely believes in the prophecy of King Hades, goes on the offensive in order to eliminate Kenta.
150	48	"Flash Sagittario (Part 2)"; Transliteration: "Shuunen no Hissatsu Tengi" (Japanese: 執念の必殺転技)	March 4, 2012	June 29, 2013 (US); July 2, 2013 (AUS)
Kenta repels Pluto with a new Special Spin Move "Diving Arrow" because of the newly evolve Sagittario doesn't have any claws on its Spin track. Gingka and the other Bladers of the Four Seasons catch the God of Destruction, who was created at the risk of everyone's lives, off guard, and finally complete Zeus' Barrier, succeeding in restraining the God of Destruction's power. The clash of Zeus' Barrier and the God of Destruction is ended with a bang.
151	49	"Hades' Persistence (Part 1)"; Transliteration: "Hadesu no shūnen" (Japanese: ハデスの執念)	March 11, 2012	July 6, 2013 (US); July 3, 2013 (AUS)
Zeus' Barrier continues to fight against Nemesis' power. Rago attempts to power Nemesis up more, but fails as the Barrier shrinks around Nemesis. The Fragment from Hades' Fusion Wheel flashes slightly as the Barrier stops Nemesis' power. The weather conditions around the globe are fixed as a result. Team Wild Fang, Wang Hu Zhong, Excalibur and Lovushka are seen celebrating as the world returns to normal. The Barrier forms a sphere around Nemesis and eventually sends a beam upwards, seemingly sending Nemesis back out of the world. The temple begins to collapse as Rago and Pluto collapse, knowing that their efforts have become futile. The Legendary Bladers and the remaining Bladers sprint out of the temple, with Aguma barely making it to the exit. Pluto curses at the Legendary Bladers as the temple explodes from existence. The Gang is hurt from the explosion, but manage to find the strength to get back up and look at what they caused. King and Masamune jump over to Gingka and hug him, with Yuki exclaiming that he did it, while Gingka disagrees and says that everyone did it. Gingka tells Kyoya that he did well, but Kyoya becomes angry. Yu and Tithi tease Kyoya over this, causing him to playfully shout at them. Gingka also applauds Chris, Dynamis, and Aguma for their help after switching sides, to which they all blush. Gingka also applauds Kenta for his work as a Legendary Blader, to which Kenta thanks him, and then thinks about Ryuga while staring at his new Sagittario. Helicopters arrive with Ryo, Hikaru, Benkei, Zeo and Toby cheering them. In another helicopter is the Blader DJ, reporting to the world with the news that Nemesis has been stopped. He lists all the Bladers involved and their past immediately before the screen cuts to views of cities. Kyoya states that he dislikes the attention and becomes angry once again. Dark power suddenly shoots up into the sky from where the Stadium once was, with Diablo Nemesis appearing once again. Everyone is shocked by this, when suddenly the true form of Nemesis appears, with Rago and Pluto fused into it. Pluto reveals that a shard from Hades pierced the barrier, allowing the full power of Nemesis to be released, rather than Nemesis to be sealed away and everyone remains shocked. While everyone remains shocked, Nemesis begins letting off a dark energy spiral around it, causing helicopters to be thrown off-balance. Everyone attaches their Beys to their Launchers, but Masamune collapses after using all his strength to pierce Nemesis' barrier but gets back up and prepares to battle. Everyone then launches and Nemesis takes on the shadow forms of each Bey, except Libra, and attacks them with even more power than before. It threw Earth Eagle, Flame Libra, Jade Jupiter, Blitz Striker, and Mercury Anubius back, destroying them and stopping them from spinning expect the Bladers of the Four Seasons beys and three of the Solar System beys. Each Blader exclaims about their Bey while Blader DJ provides commentary on the battle while Gingka stares at Nemesis.
152	50	"Hades' Persistence (Part 2)"; Transliteration: "Rasuto Batoru!" (Japanese: ラストバトル！)	March 18, 2012	July 6, 2013 (US); July 3, 2013 (AUS)
As Nemesis' fury continues to grow and rage a dark, shadow-like force is emitted from Nemesis to Earth. The large thunderclouds of darkness soon reaches every continent on Earth and as the thunder rages on, Nemesis creates The Black Sun. An apocalypse travels around the globe with earthquakes and civilians try to shelter themselves, desperate for help. Blader DJ announces all of this as the whole world, in fear watches the ongoing action appearing. The beyblades against Nemesis still continue to struggle, as they are having a very difficult time to assault Nemesis with the new weather phenomenon. Although the beys of the gang succumbed to cracks everyone did not give up and continued to attack, but Nemesis' Shadow Beasts countered this. It became quite too powerful as all the Beyblades fell to the ground. With their loss of spin and not able to battle anymore it seemed as if nothing could be done and the end is near. Gingka just stood there, thinking nothing could be done against the ruthless Nemesis. With Rago and Pluto's taunts at Gingka, it was getting under Gingka's skin and became very problematic for any solution. Gingka didn't care and knew that Nemesis would go down, but Cosmic Pegasus was beginning to lose its spin. Kyoya suddenly told Gingka he would give up the Star Fragment enchanted in his Fang Leone to Gingka's Cosmic Pegasus in an effort to prevent the world's collapse to destruction. Noting that over the time he's met Gingka, he has always trained himself to be Gingka's greatest rival, and this would prove it. Kenta then agreed to do the same, remembering of when he first met Gingka. How he saved him from the Face Hunters with his Blader's Spirit and saw him as a role model. Gingka then had a vision, of him being in the center of a galaxy. There, the Legendary Bladers and the rest of the Bladers decided to give off their Star Fragment to Cosmic Pegasus. Knowing that only Gingka can save them now, this is their last and only chance. The beys give off their Star Fragments at their owners command and goes into Cosmic Pegasus, regaining its balance and spins at full power. Gingka regains confidence in himself and his friends in order to defeat Nemesis and save Earth at all cost. With this Cosmic Pegasus speeds toward Diablo Nemesis and clash into the final battle.
153	51	"A Ray of Hope (Part 1)"; Transliteration: "Kibō no hikari" (Japanese: 希望の光)	March 25, 2012	July 13, 2013 (US); July 4, 2013 (AUS)
Pegasus enters scheme of delivering hard hitting blows to Nemesis, preventing it from countering. Everyone around the world is seen cheering for Gingka as he fights for the fate of everyone, as Tobio and Ryuto are also seen. Nemesis then uses Shadow L-Drago in an attempt to knock Pegasus flying, but Gingka commands Pegasus to use Starblast Attack on Nemesis. The collision cancels out both moves as they both fall back. Shadow L-Drago is used again, but Pegasus responds by releasing its own beast, as well as Sagittario. Everyone falls into shock that Gingka has obtained the power of the Star Beasts in his bey. He quickly switches to Leone, Ares, and Anubius to which Nemesis counters with Shadow Forms of each. With each collision, the ground crumbles around Gingka and the Legendary Bladers. Gingka quickly releases the rest of the Star Beasts, overjoying the Legendary Bladers, but infuriating Rago to the extent where he commands their Shadow Forms to appear. Each beast collides with even power as the corners of the Kingdom begin to break off. Gingka begins to reach the limit of his physical strength. Rago takes advantage of this by commanding the Black Sun to use lightning on parts of the world. The WBBA Headquarters is annihilated, with minor damage to other buildings. Gingka continues to lack strength as the Shadow Beasts defeat each and every one of the Star Beasts. Each of the Legendary Bladers feel pain from their beast being defeated. Shadow L-Drago then proceeds to attack Sagittario and succeeds, sending Kenta back. The Shadow Beasts then merge into a Mutant Dragon creature with feet and wings. A darkness storm brews, causing Gingka to struggle to stand up once again. Benkei cannot stand to watch Gingka fail after the effort he put in and thinks of a way to help. His desire proceeds to cause Dark Bull to glow, along with Spiral Lyra, Spiral Fox, and Storm Aquario. Ryo explains that every bey descended from the original Star Fragment used to create Pegasus, so every bey in the world contains a part of the Fragment, no matter how small it may be. Benkei, overjoyed at this news, stands on the edge of the Helicopter with Hikaru, Toby and Zeo and fire their Fragments at Gingka. Everyone in the world notices and does the exact same, with everyone holding their beys up in the air and releasing the power of their Fragments. Each Fragment joins together in the air and collides onto the Kingdom, removing Nemesis' Ultimate Shadow Beast and powering Pegasus up once again. Gingka and Pegasus glow golden, much to the shock of Rago. Golden Gingka commands Golden Pegasus to attack Nemesis once again as the episode ends.
154	52	"A Ray of Hope (Part 2)"; Transliteration: "Mirai he!" (Japanese: 未来へ！)	April 1, 2012	July 13, 2013 (US); July 4, 2013 (AUS)
It is in the climax of the last battle. Golden Gingka with his Golden Cosmic Pegasus against Rago with his over-powered Diablo Nemesis. Golden Gingka continues with attacks as he attempts to knock out Diablo Nemesis with all he can in his might, willpower, and wit. Rago while inside of Nemesis is not fond as Nemesis keeps continuing to attack as still, everyone around the globe is watching, but there seems to be no use in this. With Nemesis' Shadow Beast, it may seem to be the end of Gingka, Pegasus, and the fate of humanity. Golden Gingka does not care and instead commands Golden Pegasus. He rides on Golden Pegasus Beast as they fly into outer space, with which, they disappear for a moment. When at that moment, Golden Cosmic Pegasus' motif appears big and flashes, signifying a special move. Golden Gingka and Golden Pegasus glides down toward Earth, in a special move reminiscent of their first: Starblast Attack. They, with Pegasus' golden aura, strike Nemesis into its chest with a Super Cosmic Tornado, as Golden Cosmic Pegasus is in close combat with Diablo Nemesis. Gingka gives it his all, as he knows that if he loses right now, all is lost in this world and for everything else. He can only survive this battle by his friends, family, ideals, and for his wanting of a better future for his friends, family, and the ultimate fate of humanity. Golden Gingka then unleashes the final strike. Golden Pegasus goes through Nemesis' chest, creating a hole as Nemesis begins to lose power. Nemesis' dark power starts to burst away, with all of it disappearing against Nemesis' will. Rago himself, even shows his pain and agony as he cannot do anything now. Nemesis' Shadow Beast appears to be getting weaker by the moment. The Black Sun is losing power due to Nemesis losing as well and falls off, disappearing in the midst. Nemesis falls as Nemesis and Rago disappear with no trace left behind at all. The dark clouds that took place during the battle leave, as a sun-light returns. Everyone is left watching, wondering what happens to Gingka and Pegasus. It is then where Cosmic Pegasus returns to his normal form while is spinning, albeit almost losing spin. Gingka returns to his normal form as he is alone watching, with scars left throughout his body. Cosmic Pegasus ends its spin and stops, where Gingka simultaneously collapses onto the ground. Gingka's friends dash at him, being afraid if Gingka dies. They then find Gingka but see he has awoken in which they relief. Gingka then asks if Nemesis is gone. They tell him Nemesis is, away from the world to never come back, as Gingka is delighted. His friends are as well, as they reconcile with one another. Gingka however, gives thanks to a very special friend he met since his adventure started. This friend, Ryuga, who Gingka is very thankful for. Though Ryuga is deceased, Gingka knows that Ryuga gave it his all for Gingka and he couldn't have done it any other way. Even though Ryuga is deceased, Gingka knows that Ryuga is thankful and happy to have done what he had done. As time passes, multiple things occur. The Legendary Blader's resume their original roles such as Dynamis as The Guardian of Mist Mountain and Tithi with him, Gingka's being interview for saving the world, Chris leaves Metal Bey City, Masamune, King, Toby, and Zeo return to the Dungeon Gym, Aguma reunites with Bao and Beylin Fist, and Madoka is fixing the Legendary Bladers' beys. Later, Gingka and Kyoya are in a BeyStadium, with their friends there as well. Gingka and Kyoya later, decide to have a battle as they bring out their Beys, Cosmic Pegasus and Fang Leone, respectively. They prepare and yell the legendary chant, "3... 2... 1... Let It Rip!"
