= Supernaturals (toy line) =

American action figure toy line

- Tonka catalog featuring the Supernaturals
- Product type: Action figure
- Current owner: Tonka
- Produced by: Tonka
- Country: United States
- Introduced: 1987
- Discontinued: 1987; 39 years ago
- Related brands: Battle Beasts; Visionaries

Supernaturals (Note: Sometimes referred to as Super Naturals due to the logo, though Supernaturals is consistently used in Tonka material.) is the brandname to a short-lived line of action figures produced by American toy company Tonka in 1987.

== Overview ==
Supernaturals was one of several 1980s toy lines to use holographic technology, similar to Hasbro lines Visionaries: Knights of the Magical Light and Battle Beasts. Like many action figures of the period, it was split into two prosaic Heroic and Evil factions. Large Warriors, smaller Ghostlings and a selection of playsets and vehicles were released. Tonka launched Supernaturals with a large hologram display at the 1987 New York Toy Show. The use of holograms on a line of toys attracted considerable attention at the time.

The Warrior figures featured holograms on both the upper body and shield accessories, as well as 'glow-in-the-dark' weaponry. The upper body was cast in flat plastic, with the hologram giving the appearance of three dimensions; clip-on upper body armour was included to hide the hologram - simulating the Warriors being able to hide their 'real' visages, and the expression of the hologram face would change depending on the angle the toy was viewed from. Only a single wave of toys was issued before the Supernaturals was cancelled, and the line was a financial failure for Tonka.

== Toy line ==
Heroic Warriors

- Eagle-Eye (Native American War-Chief; Soaring Eagle)
  - WEAPONS: Spear; Eagle-shield
  - POWER: Sees into the future
- Lionheart (Medieval King; Powerful Lion)
  - WEAPONS: Sword; Lion-shield
  - POWER: Fierce strength
- Thunderbolt (Viking Overlord; Lightning Spirit)
  - WEAPONS: Hammer; Shield of Lightning
  - POWER: Controls thunderstorms

Evil Warriors

- Burnheart (Medieval Knight; Fiery Spirit)
  - WEAPONS: Flamethrower; Shield of Fire
  - POWER: Controls fire
  - Note: This was the only figure to feature three stages of the hologram, Man, Burning and Burnt
- Skull (Pirate Captain; Skeleton with X-ray Eye)
  - WEAPONS: Mace; Shield of Vision
  - POWER: Sees through anything
- Snakebite (Snake-Charmer; Deadly Cobra)
  - WEAPONS: Cobra-staff; Snake-shield
  - POWER: Hypnotism

Heroic Ghostlings (with swords)

- Hooter (Wise old owl-wizard)
  - POWER: Night-sight
- Mr. Lucky (Illusionist; Giant rabbit)
  - POWER: Magic
- See-Thru (Transparent scientist)
  - POWER: Invisibility
- Spooks (Silly court jester)
  - POWER: Walks through walls

Evil Ghostlings (with swords)

- Rags (Ragged Egyptian mummy)
  - POWER: Wraps up victims
- Scary-Cat (Hissing cat-witch)
  - POWER: Casts spells
- Vamp-Pa (Swooping vampire-bat)
  - POWER: Night-flight
- Weird Wolf (Teenage wolf-punk)
  - POWER: Screeching sound

Playsets and vehicles

- Bat Bopper (Evil)
- Dark Dragon (Evil)
- Ghost Finder (Heroic)
- Lion Wings (Heroic)
- Tomb of Doom

== Comic ==
In America, the toy line's backstory - featuring centuries-old warriors reviving in the Tomb of Doom - was explained by text included on the toy packaging and a pack-in mini-comic. However, in Britain a licensed fortnightly comic was produced by Fleetway Publications, featuring in-house material created to promote the line for Tonka. The series was previewed by a free comic given away with the 31 October 1987 editions of Fleetway's top selling weekly boys' comics, 2000 AD and Eagle. The first regular issue of the 32-page 40p comic was issued at the same time, with a 'Double Mask' based on the character Skull included; the second included a similar giveaway. John Gillatt, Sandy James and Jim Watson were among the artists.

In line with a pattern used in many British children's comics of the period, the comic had a fictional editor, the Ghostling Spooks. The lead strip was "The Legend of the Supernaturals" and the lighter "Ghostlings!". Also included were non-Supernaturals strips, including ventriloquist dummy story "The Doll" (written by Peter Milligan) and self-contained 'creepy' stories reportedly chosen by another Ghostling, Scary Cat. Profile material and toy adverts also featured heavily in the comic.

While the comic was produced under the auspices of IPC boys' adventure group editor Barrie Tomlinson he had very little memory of working on it when writing his autobiography. Like the toyline, the comic was not a success - lasting just nine fortnightly issues before being cancelled. Some of the material was reprinted in the hardbacked Supernaturals Adventure Book, an annual issued in 1988.

== Reception ==
Toy historian Mark Bellomo included the line in an article for Mental Floss about twelve 1980s toys that did not take off, noting that the then-innovative hologram technology made the figures prohibitively expensive for many of the children of the time.
