= List of Beyblade: Shogun Steel episodes =

Beyblade: Shogun Steel
- Season 4
- No. of episodes: 45 (Japanese version); 26 (English version)

Release
- Original network: TXN (TV Tokyo)
- Original release: April 8 – December 23, 2012

Season chronology
- ← Previous; Metal Fury

Beyblade: Shogun Steel, known in Japan as Metal Fight Beyblade Zero-G (メタルファイト ベイブレード ZERO-G) is the fourth and final season of the Japanese anime television series Beyblade: Metal Saga based on Takafumi Adachi's manga series Beyblade: Metal Fusion, which itself is based on the Beyblade spinning top game from Takara Tomy and Hasbro. Directly following Beyblade: Metal Fury, the season is produced by d-rights and Nelvana under the direction of Kunihisa Sugishima. The season features a new hero named Zyro Kurogane, and his bey, Samurai Ifrit. The season began airing on TV Tokyo in Japan starting April 8, 2012. Following the original 12 minute long 38 episodes that aired in Japan, an additional seven 24-minute episodes were released exclusively on DVD, bringing the total number of Japanese episodes to 45, and internationally to 26 24-minute episodes.

== Episode list ==
No. overall	No. in season	Title	Original release date	English air date
155	1	"A New Age Arrives (Part 1)"; Transliteration: "Shin jidai tōrai!" (Japanese: 新時代到来！)	April 8, 2012	August 17, 2013 (U.S.) & (CAN)
Seven years have past since the defeat of Rago and Nemesis by Gingka Hagane and Pegasus, the other Legendary Bladers and their friends; the group having spread across the world to help restore interest in Beyblade following the destruction Nemesis caused, including Bey mechanic Madoka Amano and skilled Blader Tsubasa Otori, who now runs the WBBA. Zyro Kurogane, a Blader who received Samurai Ifrit from Gingka himself when the former was a child, visits Metal Bey City, where Gingka and a few of his friends lived, while on a training journey following his achievement of a 100 win streak. Forcing those in a Beypark to fight him in a new Zero-G Beystadium, Zyro is challenged by the strongest Blader in the city; Shinobu Hiryūin and his Ninja Salamander.
156	2	"A New Age Arrives! (Part 2)"; Transliteration: "ZeroG batoru!" (Japanese: ZeroGバトル!)	April 15, 2012	August 17, 2013 (U.S.); March 5, 2016 (CAN)
Despite his past efforts, Zyro is outclassed by Shinobu and inexperienced with the new Beystadium, leading to him losing their battle. Heading to an eatery known as Bull Burger, he learns it is owned by a friend of Gingka's and Legendary Blader Kyoya Tategami's best friend, Benkei Hanawa, who manages the Beypark and offers to train Zyro to improve his skills. Maru, who works with Madoka and collects data on Beybattles, decides to tag along to collect data on Zyro.
157	3	"Defeat Pirate Orochi! (Part 1)"; Transliteration: "Jigoku no tokkun" (Japanese: 地獄の特訓)	April 22, 2012	August 17, 2013 (U.S.); March 6, 2016 (CAN)
Zyro begins his training with Benkei, which includes exhausting exercise to strengthen his launch techniques, hoping to be able to beat Shinobu. However, he becomes aware of a formidable young Blader named Eight Unabara who wields Pirate Orochi and punishes his opponents by drawing on their face with marker when he defeats them, deciding to face Eight in battle.
158	4	"Defeat Pirate Orochi! (Part 2)"; Transliteration: "Taose! Pairētsu Orojya!" (Japanese: 倒せ!パイレーツオロジャ!)	April 29, 2012	August 17, 2013 (U.S.); March 7, 2016 (CAN)
Zyro uses what he learned training with Benkei and takes advantage of the unique nature of the Zero-G Beystadium to defeat Eight's Orochi. After the battle, Maru uses Eight's own punishment on him, causing him to declare that his brother will avenge him. Madoka, who had watched the battle, tells Tsubasa about Zyro and Ifrit.
159	5	"The Blazing Special Move (Part 1)"; Transliteration: "Taiketsu! Ribenji Macchi" (Japanese: 対決！リベンジマッチ)	May 6, 2012	August 24, 2013 (U.S.); March 8, 2016 (CAN)
While Zyro hopes to fight Shinobu again, the latter has no interest in a rematch. Madoka, Benkei, and Tsubasa discuss these new, promising Bladers, deciding to hold a 1-Day Tournament at the Zero-G Beystadium which will give Zyro a chance to fight Shinobu; the two ending up as the tournament's finalists. Eight observes the tournament with his brother Kite, who collects data on Zyro.
160	6	"The Blazing Special Move (Part 2)"; Transliteration: "Honō no hissatsu tengi" (Japanese: 炎の必殺転技)	May 13, 2012	August 24, 2013 (U.S.); March 9, 2016 (CAN)
Thanks to the progress he's made, experience he's gained, and a new special move, Zyro and Ifrit defeat Shinobu and Salamander, forming a connection between the two. Having collected data he deems perfect, Kite prepares to fight Zyro on Eight's behalf.
161	7	"The Extraordinary Synchrome! (Part 1)"; Transliteration: "Rivaizā no chōsen" (Japanese: リヴァイザーの挑戦！)	May 20, 2012	August 31, 2013 (U.S.); March 10, 2016 (CAN)
While Kite studies the data he collected on Zyro, Benkei takes Zyro, Maru, and Shinobu to a special Bey training camp. After a day full of vigorous physical training, the three return to the city and encounter Eight, who challenges Zyro to fight his brother Kite and the latter's Bey Guardian Leviathan.
162	8	"The Extraordinary Synchrome! (Part 2)"; Transliteration: "Kyōi no shinkurōmu!" (Japanese: 驚異のシンクローム！)	May 27, 2012	August 31, 2013 (U.S.); March 11, 2016 (CAN)
Zyro and Ifrit overcome Kite and Leviathan due to the former duo's immense improvement since Kite's initial data collection. After losing his cool, Kite and Eight fuse the Warrior Wheels of their Beys, creating the heavier Orochi Leviathan which easily defeats Ifrit.
163	9	"The Strength of a Bond (Part 1)"; Transliteration: "Kurenai no charenjā" (Japanese: 紅のチャレンジャー)	June 3, 2012	September 7, 2013 (U.S.); March 12, 2016 (CAN)
Zyro, Shinobu, and Maru are invited to the WBBA headquarters where they're told of Gingka's friends' goal to spread love of Beyblade across the recovering world, as well as the fact that the Unabara brothers' bond allowed them to discover the unique Synchrome System made by Tsubasa and Madoka on their own. Zyro hopes to form a Synchrome Bey with Shinobu to get back at the brothers, but Shinobu refuses out of jealousy after learning that Zyro received Ifrit from Gingka, deciding instead to try to form a Synchrome Bey with the formidable Ren Kurenai and her Thief Phoenix, who copy Zyro's fighting style; Zyro challenging Ren to a battle to decide between the two.
164	10	"The Strength of a Bond (Part 2)"; Transliteration: "Shasai no pawā" (Japanese: 絆の力)	June 10, 2012	September 7, 2013 (U.S.)
Zyro defeats Ren and appeals to Shinobu that they have a significant bond and rivalry. After some encouragement from Benkei, Shinobu agrees to help Zyro get back at the Unabara brothers. The two form Salamander Ifrit and defeat Orochi Leviathan. Remembering Tsubasa's words about the importance ofvfriends and rivals in getting stronger, Zyro appeals to the Unabara brothers to join his circle of friends so they can build a new era together, his words impacting an observing Ren as well as the brothers.
165	11	"Explode, Phantom Fire Shot! (Part 1)"; Transliteration: "Maiori shitaka" (Japanese: 舞い降りし鷹)	June 17, 2012	September 14, 2013 (U.S.)
Zero, Maru, Shinobu, and the Unabara brothers are surprised that Ren has accompanied them to participate in special training with Benkei. The training exposes that Ren and Phoenix are more suited for fighting in Zero-G Bey Stadiums and draws out more jealousy from Shinobu since unlike Zyro, he doesn't have a Special Move. So, after helping Benkei with a busy Bull Burger, Ren steals the key to the Beypark and ends up in a fight with Takanosuke Shishiya and his Archer Griffin, taking the place of Zyro and Ifrit who Takanosuke wanted to fight.
166	12	"Explode, Phantom Fire Shot! (Part 2)"; Transliteration: "Sakuretsu! Mugen Hiryūgeki" (Japanese: 炸裂！無幻火流撃)	June 24, 2012	September 14, 2013 (U.S.)
After Takanosuke defeats Ren, Shinobu challenges him to overturn Takanosuke's demeaning view of Bladers othed than Zyro. However, he is fighting too much like Zyro, which Benkei calls out, leading Shinobu to make his own Special Move with his own fighting style to defeat Archer. Afterwards, Takanosuke and Zyro both declare their intentions to reach the top in the Beyblade world.
167	13	"Kraken Attacks (Part 1)"; Transliteration: "Kyōfu! Manatsu no bīchi" (Japanese: 恐怖！真夏のビーチ)	July 1, 2012	September 21, 2013 (U.S.)
168	14	"Kraken Attacks (Part 2)"; Transliteration: "Kirāken raishū" (Japanese: キラーケン来襲!)	July 8, 2012	September 21, 2013 (U.S.)
169	15	"The Jet Black Dragon (Part 1)"; Transliteration: "Shūgeki! Nazo no Burēdā" (Japanese: 襲撃！謎のブレーダー)	July 15, 2012	September 28, 2013 (U.S.)
170	16	"The Jet Black Dragon (Part 2)"; Transliteration: "Shikkoku no Doragon" (Japanese: 漆黒のドラゴン)	July 22, 2012	September 28, 2013 (U.S.)
171	17	"Clash! Zyro VS Sakyo (Part 1)"; Transliteration: "Gāgoiru no wana" (Japanese: ガーゴイルの罠)	July 29, 2012	October 5, 2013 (U.S.)
172	18	"Clash! Zyro VS Sakyo (Part 2)"; Transliteration: "Gekitotsu! Zyro VS Sakyō" (Japanese: 激突!ゼロVS左京)	July 29, 2012	October 5, 2013 (U.S.)
173	19	"The Ironclad Golem (Part 1)"; Transliteration: "Difensu saikyō no otoko" (Japanese: ディフェンス最強の男)	August 12, 2012	October 12, 2013 (U.S.)
174	20	"The Ironclad Golem (Part 2)"; Transliteration: "Tapeiki no Goreimu" (Japanese: 鉄壁のゴレイム)	August 19, 2012	October 12, 2013 (U.S.)
175	21	"A Heated Battle of Friendship (Part 1)"; Transliteration: "Atsuki yūjō no batoru" (Japanese: 熱き友情の特訓(バトル))	August 26, 2012	October 19, 2013 (U.S.)
176	22	"A Heated Battle of Friendship (Part 2)"; Transliteration: "Unare! Orojya Rivaizā" (Japanese: 唸れ!オロジャリヴァイザー)	September 2, 2012	October 19, 2013 (U.S.)
177	23	"The Ruthless Behemoth (Part 1)"; Transliteration: "Teppeki no bōgyo o uchiyabure" (Japanese: 鉄壁の防御を打ち破れ)	September 9, 2012	October 26, 2013 (U.S.)
178	24	"The Ruthless Behemoth (Part 2)"; Transliteration: "Hijō no Begiradosu" (Japanese: 非情のベギラドス)	September 16, 2012	October 26, 2013 (U.S.)
176	25	"A Fierce Synchrome Battle (Part 1)"; Transliteration: "Kachitore! chōsenken" (Japanese: 勝ち取れ！挑戦権)	September 23, 2012	November 2, 2013
In the WBBA building, Tsubasa and Madoka analyze Kira's beyblade. Meanwhile, Zyro and the gang are practicing for the new Synchrom battle request. In the rocky location, Zyro practices by destroying the rocks with Salamander Ifrit. All of a sudden, Kite comes and angrily "attacks" Zyro. Eight explains that it is because Zyro managed to beat Yoshio before he could. When Kite finds out about the Sychrom battle, he decides that he should be the one to battle in it. Benkei settles their argument by saying that they should battle at BeyPark. And so they do, and Zyro emerges victorious. In the WBBA headquarters, Kira has hacked into the computer and chats with Tsubasa.
180	26	"A Fierce Synchrome Battle (Part 2)"; Transliteration: "Gekitō! Shinkurōmubatoru" (Japanese: 激闘！シンクロームバトル)	September 30, 2012	November 2, 2013
181	27	"Neo Battle Bladers (Part 1)"; Transliteration: "Aku no idenshi" (Japanese: 悪の遺伝子)	October 7, 2012	November 9, 2013
182	28	"Neo Battle Bladers (Part 2)"; Transliteration: "Neo Batoru Burēdāzu" (Japanese: ネオ・バトルブレーダーズ)	October 14, 2012	November 9, 2013
Blader Gai announces nationwide the advent of Neo Battle Bladers, the latest in Beyblade official play. Zyro, Kira, and Yoshio successfully compete for the registration of the tournament, but Ren is defeated by a newcomer Blader by the name of Genjūrō, a representative of DNA. Elsewhere, Zyro easily defeats a group of Bladers with his Samurai Ifrit, when an explosion comes nearby. When the mist clears, the only ones left are Takanosuke and Sakyo.
183	29	"The Best 8 Decided! (Part 1)"; Transliteration: "DNA Hōimō" (Japanese: DNA包囲網)	October 21, 2012	November 16, 2013
184	30	"The Best 8 Decided! (Part 2)"; Transliteration: "Kettei! Besuto Eito" (Japanese: 決定!ベスト8)	October 28, 2012	November 16, 2013
185	31	"Get Pumped For The Finals! (Part 1)"; Transliteration: "Moero! Kesshō Taikai" (Japanese: 燃えろ!決勝大会)	November 4, 2012	November 16, 2013
186	32	"Get Pumped For The Finals! (Part 2)"; Transliteration: "Nekketsu! Zero VS Takanosuke" (Japanese: 熱血!ゼロVS鷹ノ助)	November 11, 2012	November 16, 2013
187	33	"A Fated Showdown Between Rivals (Part 1)"; Transliteration: "Tomo tono chikai" (Japanese: 友との誓い)	November 17, 2012	November 16, 2013
188	34	"A Fated Showdown Between Rivals (Part 2)"; Transliteration: "Shukumei no Raibaru Taiketsu" (Japanese: 宿命のライバル対決)	November 16, 2012	November 16, 2013
189	35	"The Ultimate Emperor of Destruction: Bahamoote (Part 1)"; Transliteration: "Kyūkyoku hakai kō Bahamudia" (Japanese: 究極破壊皇バハムディア)	December 2, 2012	November 16, 2013
190	36	"The Ultimate Emperor of Destruction: Bahamoote (Part 2)"; Transliteration: "Takusareta omoi" (Japanese: 託された想い)	December 9, 2012	November 16, 2013
191	37	"A Spirit-filled Attack! (Part 1)"; Transliteration: "Sōzetsu!! Fainaru Macchi" (Japanese: 壮絶!ファイナルマッチ)	December 16, 2012	November 16, 2013
192	38	"A Spirit-filled Attack! (Part 2)"; Transliteration: "Kokoro no ichigeki" (Japanese: 心の一撃)	December 23, 2012	November 16, 2013
193	39	"A New Fight"; Transliteration: "Aratanaru tatakai" (Japanese: 新たなる戦い)	August 28, 2013 (DVD)	November 23, 2013
194	40	"The Legend and the Evil Combine"; Transliteration: "Densetsu to akuma no yūgō" (Japanese: 伝説と悪魔の融合)	August 28, 2013 (DVD)	November 30, 2013
195	41	"Doji's Stronghold"; Transliteration: "Daidōji no yōsai" (Japanese: 大道寺の要塞)	August 28, 2013 (DVD)	December 7, 2013
196	42	"Entering the Trap"; Transliteration: "Machiukeru wana" (Japanese: 待ち受ける罠)	August 28, 2013 (DVD)	January 4, 2014
197	43	"Byakko's Roar"; Transliteration: "Byakko no otakebi" (Japanese: 白虎の雄叫び)	September 25, 2013 (DVD)	January 11, 2014
198	44	"The All-out Mid-air Battle!"; Transliteration: "Kesshi no kūchū Batoru" (Japanese: 決死の空中バトル)	September 25, 2013 (DVD)	January 18, 2014
199	45	"The Bridge to the Future"; Transliteration: "Mirai he no kakehashi" (Japanese: 未来への架け橋)	September 25, 2013 (DVD)	January 25, 2014
