= List of Beyblade episodes =

Beyblade is a Japanese anime television series and currently has 876 episodes.

== Series overview ==
Series overview
No.	Title	Episodes	Run
Beyblade
1	Beyblade	51	January 8, 2001 – December 24, 2001
2	Beyblade V-Force	51	January 7, 2002 – December 30, 2002
3	Beyblade G-Revolution	52	January 6, 2003 – December 29, 2003
Beyblade: Metal Saga
1	Beyblade: Metal Fusion	51	April 5, 2009 – March 28, 2010
2	Beyblade: Metal Masters	51	April 4, 2010 – March 27, 2011
3	Beyblade: Metal Fury	52 (Japanese version); 39 (English version)	April 3, 2011 – April 1, 2012
4	Beyblade: Shogun Steel	45 (Japanese version); 26 (English version)	April 8, 2012 – December 23, 2012
Spin-off series
1	BeyWheelz	13	August 11, 2012 – October 6, 2012
2	BeyWarriors: BeyRaiderz	13	January 4, 2014 – March 29, 2014
3	BeyWarriors: Cyborg	26 + 2 specials	October 18, 2014 – February 27, 2015
Beyblade Burst
1	Beyblade Burst	51	April 4, 2016 – March 27, 2017
2	Beyblade Burst Evolution	51	April 3, 2017 – March 26, 2018
3	Beyblade Burst Turbo	51	April 2, 2018 – March 25, 2019
4	Beyblade Burst Rise	52 (Japanese version); 26 (English version)	April 5, 2019 – March 27, 2020
5	Beyblade Burst Surge	52 (Japanese version); 26 (English version)	April 3, 2020 – March 19, 2021
6	Beyblade Burst QuadDrive	52 (Japanese version); 26 (English version)	April 2, 2021 – March 18, 2022
7	Beyblade Burst QuadStrike	26	April 3, 2023 – December 2, 2023
Beyblade X
1	Beyblade X	51	October 6, 2023 – October 4, 2024
2	Beyblade X	49	October 18, 2024 – October 3, 2025
3	Beyblade X	34	October 24, 2025 – September 18, 2026
Total		876	January 8, 2001 – present

== Episodes ==
=== Beyblade ===
- List of Beyblade episodes
  - Beyblade
  - Beyblade V-Force
  - Beyblade G-Revolution

=== Beyblade: Metal Saga ===
- List of Beyblade: Metal Saga episodes
  - Beyblade Metal Fusion
  - Beyblade: Metal Masters
  - Beyblade: Metal Fury
  - Beyblade: Shogun Steel

=== Spin-off series ===
- BeyWheelz
- BeyWarriors: BeyRaiderz
- BeyWarriors: Cyborg

=== Beyblade Burst ===
- List of Beyblade Burst episodes
  - Beyblade Burst
  - Beyblade Burst Evolution
  - Beyblade Burst Turbo
  - Beyblade Burst Rise
  - Beyblade Burst Surge
  - Beyblade Burst QuadDrive
  - Beyblade Burst QuadStrike

=== Beyblade X ===
- Beyblade X
  - Beyblade X season 1
  - Beyblade X season 2
  - Beyblade X season 3
