= Beyblade Burst QuadStrike =

Season of television series 1 to 7

- Season 7
- Key Visual
- No. of episodes: 26

Release
- Original network: Disney XD
- Original release: April 3 – December 2, 2023

Season chronology
- ← Previous; Burst QuadDrive

Beyblade Burst QuadStrike is a 2023 anime series and the seventh and final season of Beyblade Burst. On December 1, 2022, it was announced that a seventh and final season would be released for the international market in spring 2023. The series was produced by ADK Emotions and animated by OLM and began airing in the United States on Disney XD on April 3, 2023, and was released on Hulu on May 8, 2023. The English opening theme is "Darkness Turns to Light" by Our Last Night while the ending theme is an instrumental version of "Darkness Turns to Light".

== Episode list ==
No. overall	No. in season	English dub title / Japanese translated title	Directed by	Written by	Storyboarded by	English air date	Japanese air date
310	1	"Thunder and Lightning! Elemental Power!" / Erupting! Thunderous! Element Power! Transliteration: "Bakuretsu! Bakurai! Eremento Pawā!" (Japanese: 爆裂! 爆雷! エレメントパワー!!)	Dai Fukuyama	Hideki Sonoda	Oh Jin-Koo	April 3, 2023	TBA
The Grand Masquerade Bey Tournament is here! Bladers have gathered at a mysterious "Power Spot", overflowing with elemental energy. Bel Daizora faces off with the masked Blader known as Quadra.
311	2	"The Rebirth! Divine Belfyre!" / Explosive Birth! Divine Belial! Transliteration: "Bakutan! Divuain Beriaru!" (Japanese: 爆誕! ディヴァインベリアル!!)	Arisa Shima	Hideki Sonoda	Katsuhito Akiyama	April 4, 2023	TBA
Bel can't get the mysterious masked Blader off his mind. When he's facing Ranzo Kiyama, Bel sees Quadra. This doesn't sit right with Ranzo, who threatens to exit the Theater of the Abyss.
312	3	"Rise Up! Gambit Dragon Soars!" / GT is Here! Gatling Dragon!! Transliteration: "Gachi Kita~a! Gatoringu Doragon!!" (Japanese: ガチ来たァ! ガトリングドラゴン!!)	Kiribi Takanashi	Toshimichi Okawa	Moto Terada	April 5, 2023	TBA
World-class Blader and loveable goofball, Dante Koryu, has arrived at Phantom's Gate to challenge the Dark Prince. Pax Forxythe has ordered Quadra to battle Bel.
313	4	"Depths Below! Abyssal Tournament!" / Let's Do It, Heck Tournament!! Transliteration: "Yaru Ze Makai Tōnamento!!" (Japanese: やるぜッ魔界トーナメント！！)	Yoshito Hata	Toshimichi Okawa	Takeshi Mori	April 6, 2023	TBA
Pri Forsythe and Hanna Suiro have a sleepover at the Suiro house; Hanna's excited to tell Pri all about her family; Pri finds a special blading delivery from her brother overseas.
314	5	"Dragon vs. Pandora! Rising Tides!" / Roaring! Dragon vs. Pandora!! Transliteration: "Bakusō! Doragon VS Pandora!!" (Japanese: 爆走！ ドラゴンVSパンドラ！！)	Yusuke Onoda	Hideki Sonoda	Katsuhito Akiyama	April 7, 2023	TBA
Pri removes her mask to reveal herself as the enigmatic Quadra. Pax tells Pri to keep her mask on while battling or else risk ruining their research data.
315	6	"Howls of Terror! Kerbeus Returns!" / Kerbeus! The Guard Dog Returns!! Transliteration: "Kerubeusu! Kaettekita Tōken!!" (Japanese: ケルベウス！ 帰ってきた闘犬！！)	Akira Miyata	Toshimichi Okawa	Moto Terada	April 8, 2023	TBA
Bel, Ranzo and Hanna find a puppet show that offers a Bey tournament; Bel and Ranzo go up against a three-headed guard dog and Pri handles being both a puppeteer and a Blader.
316	7	"Theater of the Dark Prince! Monstrous Missions!" / Demon King's Hell Mission Theater!! Transliteration: "Maō no Jigoku Misshon Gekijō!!" (Japanese: 魔王の地獄ミッション劇場！！)	Dai Fukuyama	Toshimichi Okawa	Oh Jin-Koo	April 15, 2023	TBA
Ken Midori has a bunch of training exercises for Bel, Ranzo and Pri that will hone their skills for both puppetry as well as Blading, And when training's over, it's time to battle!
317	8	"Peerless! Xiphoid Xcalius!" / Peerless! Xiphoid Xcalibur!! Transliteration: "Tenkaippin! Shifoido Ekusukaribā!!" (Japanese: 天下一品！ ジフォイドエクスカリバー！！)	Arisa Shima	Hideki Sonoda	Takeshi Mori	April 22, 2023	TBA
Valt Aoi offers anyone to face off with his super-powerful friend. So, Bel, Pri and Ranzo go to the Shakadera family dojo just as the mystery Blader completes a 300 Blader challenge.
318	9	"Striking Flames! Ferocious Battle!" / Shakuenji Dojo! Ferocious Battle!! Transliteration: "Shakuenji Dōjō! Dai Gekitō!!" (Japanese: 灼炎寺道場！ 大激闘！！)	Chika Herube	Hideki Sonoda	Masatoshi Hakata	April 29, 2023	TBA
Can Bel, Pri and Ranzo keep up with the Shakadera training regimen? It's time to face Xander Shakadera in a one-on-one battle! Ranzo is confident that he has got what it takes.
319	10	"Dark Devotion! Mighty Sword!" / Demon King vs. Unmatched!! Transliteration: "Maō Tai Musō!!" (Japanese: 魔王対無双！！)	Shigeru Yamazaki	Hideki Sonoda	Eran	May 6, 2023	TBA
The Bladers take a quick snack break. Jiji comes to the rescue with his signature scrumptious feast. Xander presents Bel with a challenge over who gets Jiji to stay with them.
320	11	"Surge Ahead! Battle Camp Clash!" / Sparking! Big Clash at the Battle Camp! Transliteration: "Supākingu! Batoru Kyanpu Dai Gekitotsu!" (Japanese: スパーキング！ バトルキャンプ大激突！)	Kiribi Takanashi	Toshimichi Okawa	Katsuhito Akiyama	May 13, 2023	TBA
Bel, Ranzo and Pri have been invited to Battle Island, where rookie Bladers gather to train and compete! There they meet the pair of Hizashi brothers, Hikaru and Hyuga.
321	12	"Hurricane Winds! Twister Pandora!" / The Third Element! Blasting Wind, Twister Pandora!! Transliteration: "Dai 3 no Eremento! Bakufū Tsuisutā Pandora!!" (Japanese: 第3のエレメント！ 爆風ツイスターパンドラ！！)	Ryou Miyata	Toshimichi Okawa	Amano Hiromasa	May 20, 2023	TBA
Training at the battle camp is hard, and some Bladers have more trouble following Wakiya Murasaki's rules than others; Bel goes off script, declaring a rematch with his new rival Hyuga.
322	13	"Tag-Team! Break the Limit!" / Great Revolution! Tag Battle!! Transliteration: "Supākingu! Batoru Kyanpu Dai Gekitotsu!" (Japanese: 大乱間! タッグバトル!!)	Dai Fukuyama	Toshimichi Okawa	Takeshi Mori	May 27, 2023	TBA
It's the climax of Wakiya's battle camp and the assembled Bladers participate in a Tag-Team tournament; the Hizashi brothers are skilled at Battling as a team, but others aren't.
323	14	"Turbo Time! Zeal Achilles!" / Super Z! Zest Achilles! Transliteration: "Chōzetsuda! Zesuto Akiresu!!" (Japanese: 超ゼツだ！ ゼストアキレス！！)	Arisa Shima	Hideki Sonoda	Yukihiro Matushita	July 1, 2023	TBA
Aiger Akabane has arrived at Phantom's Gate! Aiger has no choice but to test out the new Quad Bey Zeal Achilles on the Dark Prince. There's a condition: Bel will have to join forces with Pri to face him!
324	15	"Chivalry Unbound! Whirl Knight!" / Knight of the Wind, Wind Knight!! Transliteration: "Kaze Tsukai no Kishi, Uindo Naito!!" (Japanese: 風使いの騎士ウインドナイト！！)	Yousuke Fujino	Toshimichi Okawa	Takeshi Mori	July 8, 2023	TBA
Skilled Bladers from all over the globe were chosen to compete in the Champion's Challenge Tournament, including Valt's fellow BC Sol Blader, Kit Lopez.
325	16	"Wild Dash! Battle Marathon!" / Explosive Dash! Battle Marathon!! Transliteration: "Bakuretsu Gekisō! Batoru Marason!!" (Japanese: 爆裂激走！ バトルマラソン！！)	Chika Herube	Toshimichi Okawa	Yoshiaki Okumura	July 15, 2023	TBA
The Champion's Challenge Tournament keeps spinning, but one important face is missing, since the Dark Prince is nowhere to be seen.
326	17	"Blazing Battles! Aether Stadium!" / Crimson Battle, Aether Stadium!! Transliteration: "Kurenai no Batoru, Īsa Sutajiamu!!" (Japanese: 紅のバトル、イーサスタジアム！！)	Yusuke Onoda	Hideki Sonoda	Takeshi Mori	July 22, 2023	TBA
Something monumental is found hidden deep beneath the Grand Masquerade Bey Tournament's stage, and it might change the face of Blading forever.
327	18	"Darkness Unleashed! Winds of Change!" / Explosive and Blasting!! Transliteration: "Bakuretsu to Bakufū!!" (Japanese: 爆裂と爆風！！)	Shigeki Awai	Toshimichi Okawa	Katsuhito Akiyama	July 29, 2023	TBA
It's the final stage of the Champion's Challenge, and the pressure is on when Pax gives Pri some strict instructions on how to use Pandora.
328	19	"Champion's Challenge! Radiant Finals!" / Champion's Challenge! Decisive Battle in the Sky!! Transliteration: "Chanpion Charenji! Tenkū no Kessen!!" (Japanese: チャンピオンチャレンジ！ 天空の決戦！！)	Oh Jin-Koo	Hideki Sonoda	Akira Tsuchiya	August 5, 2023	TBA
Everyone has something to prove when Bel and Kit are set to face off for the chance to challenge Aiger.
329	20	"Invincible Shadows! Aiger vs. Bel!" / Super Z Strongest Aiga vs. Demon King Bell!! Transliteration: "Chōzetsu Saikyō Aiga VS Baō Beru!!" (Japanese: 超ゼツ最強アイガVS 魔王ベル！！)	Arisa Shima	Toshimichi Okawa	Takeshi Mori	August 12, 2023	October 30, 2023
Bel climbs his way to the top and earns the right to challenge Aiger for a chance to become new World Champion.
330	21	"Dire Destiny! Ruin Pandemonium!" / Banmaden! Ruin Pandemonium!! Transliteration: "Banmaden! Rūin Pandemoniumu!!" (Japanese: 万魔殿！ ルーインパンデモニウム！！)	Gaku Shiga	Hideki Sonoda	Masatoshi Hakata	August 19, 2023	TBA
Pax finally returns to the Blading stage with a vengeance and an Ultimate Elemental Bey; inspired by his loss against Aiger, Bel has evolved Belfyre into something stronger than ever before.
331	22	"Shining Stars! Lodestar Battle Tournament!" / Shining Stars! Element Battle Tournament!! Transliteration: "Senkō! Eremento Batoru Tōnamento!!" (Japanese: 戦光！ エレメントバトルトーナメント！！)	Shigeru Yamazaki	Hideki Sonoda	Takeshi Mori	November 4, 2023	TBA
Wakiya's new Lodestar Battle Tournament has everything expected of a Beyblade competition, but figuring out who will get to enter will be a challenge in and of it itself!
332	23	"Vroom-Vroom Revolution! A Hero's Journey!" / Aim to be a Hero! Vroom-vroom Revolution!! Transliteration: "Mezase Hīrō! Gakkigaki Dai Funtō!!" (Japanese: 目指せヒーロー！ ガッキガキ大奮闘！！)	Yoshito Hata	Toshimichi Okawa	Yoshiaki Okumura	November 11, 2023	TBA
The Hizashi brothers vroom-vroom their way into the Lodestar Battle Tournament! Facing evolved forms of Belfyre and Valtryek, will they be able to overcome the odds?
333	24	"Achilles vs. Pandemonium! Clashes of Light!" / Cho-Z vs. Purgatory's Black Flame!! Transliteration: "Chōzetsu Tai Rengoku no Kuro Honō!!" (Japanese: 超ゼツ 対 煉獄の黒炎！！)	Yusuke Onoda	Toshimichi Okawa	Takeshi Mori	November 18, 2023	TBA
Aiger faces off against Pax in the Lodestar Battle Tournament. As the battle rages on, Pax's desperation and obsession starts to make Shu Kurenai and some of the other Blading Legends nervous.
334	25	"Resonance vs. Elemental!" / Resonance vs. Elemental! Transliteration: "Kyoumei vs Eremento!!" (Japanese: 共鳴VSエレメント！！)	Arisa Shima	Hideki Sonoda	Oh Jin-Koo	November 25, 2023	TBA
Pri just can't believe what Pax is willing to do to unleash the greatest elemental power possible. With the help of the Dark Prince, Pri takes her launch power to new heights.
335	26	"Elemental Battle! Ultimate Showdown!" / Bursting with Intense Heat! Element Battle!! Transliteration: "Bakuretsu Gekinetsu! Eremento Batoru!!" (Japanese: 爆裂激熱！ エレメントバトル！！)	Oh Jin-Koo	Hideki Sonoda	Katsuhito Akiyama; Oh Jin-Koo	December 2, 2023	TBA
Bel's preparing for his semi-final match against Pax, and this fierce semi-final battle is sure to remind everyone why they love Blading!
