= Beyblade Burst season 1 =

Beyblade Burst
- Season 1
- Key Visual
- No. of episodes: 51

Release
- Original network: TXN (TV Tokyo, TV Osaka)
- Original release: April 4, 2016 – March 27, 2017

Season chronology
- Next → Burst Evolution

Beyblade Burst is the first season of the 2016 Japanese anime series Beyblade Burst. The series was produced by D-rights and TV Tokyo and animated by OLM, and it premiered on all TXN stations in Japan on April 4, 2016. An English version of the anime premiered in Canada on Teletoon on September 10, 2016 and on Disney XD on October 2. The series also premiered on 9Go! in Australia on December 5, 2016, and on Disney XD in the United States on December 19, 2016. The opening theme for the series is "Burst Finish!", by Tatsuyuki Kobayashi, while the ending theme is "Believe", by Shiklamen. The English theme for the season is "Our Time" by Shaun Chasin.

== Episode list ==
No.	Japanese Translated title/English title	Original release date	English air date
1	"Let's Go! Valkyrie!" / Let's Go! Valtryek! Transliteration: "Ikō ze! Varukirī!!" (Japanese: 行こうぜ!相棒(ヴァルキリー)!!)	April 4, 2016	September 10, 2016 (Canada); December 5, 2016 (Australia); December 19, 2016 (United States)
Valt Aoi, who loves Beyblade, is invited to compete in a local Beyblade Tournament by his close friend Shu Kurenai. In the first match of the local tournament, is it possible for Valt to win against Honcho?
2	"Guard Dog Of The Underworld! Kerbeus!!" / Kerbeus: Guard Dog of the Underworld! Transliteration: "Meikai no Banken! Kerubeusu!!!" (Japanese: 冥界の番犬！ケルベウス！！)	April 11, 2016	September 11, 2016 (Canada); December 6, 2016 (Australia); December 20, 2016 (United States)
Valt has emerged as the winner of his first round at the local tournament. Shu finds himself shocked that the battle against Honcho ended with a Burst Finish. While Valt excites himself to begin his intensive training, he is invited by his younger twin brothers Toko and Nika to see a puppet show. But the contents of the puppet show was slightly unusual. And, as the second round of the local tournament begins, the opponent facing Valt is Ken Midori, the puppet-controlling Blader.
3	"Explosive! Rush Shoot!" / Blast-Off! Rush Launch! Transliteration: "Bakuretsu! Rasshu Shūto!!" (Japanese: 爆裂!ラッシュシュート!!)	April 18, 2016	September 17, 2016 (Canada); December 7, 2016 (Australia); December 21, 2016 (United States)
The match between Valt and Ken reaches its third battle. However, Valt is overcome by his nerves and ends up dropping Valtryek. The ones appearing before Valt to pick up his Valtryek are none other than Ken's puppets, Ker and Beus and, at that moment, Valt remembers that...? Finally, the match between Valt and Ken concludes! Who is the winner of the second round!?
4	"Let's Create A Beyblade Club!" / Beyblade Club: Let's Get Started! Transliteration: "Beiburēdo Kurabu wo Tsukuru ze!" (Japanese: ベイブレードクラブをつくるぜ!)	April 25, 2016	September 18, 2016 (Canada); December 8, 2016 (Australia); December 22, 2016 (United States)
Valt decides to create a Beyblade Club and the first person he invites is Honcho which leads to a battle to decide who will be Beyblade Club Captain, After narrowly winning the battle Valt decides to put the decision of captain on hold until they have all members. Next up on Valt's list to invite is Ken who agrees to join but only if Valt sets up a match between him and Shu.
5	"The Grim Reaper Descends! The Jet-Black Deathscyther!!" / Into the Darkness! Dark Doomscizor! Transliteration: "Shinigami Kōrin! Shikkoku no Desusaizā!!" (Japanese: 死神降臨!漆黒のデスサイザー!!)	May 2, 2016	September 24, 2016 (Canada); December 9, 2016 (Australia); December 23, 2016 (United States)
Valt's next opponent is Daigo Kurogami. Ken has a bad feeling about Daigo's provocation before the match. His bad feelings were correct, as Valt's Rush Launch is completely nullified in this match. As Daigo provokes him more and more, Valt becomes unable to perform a Rush Launch at all..!
6	"Keep It Together! This Is Special Training!!" / Get Ready! Crash Course! Transliteration: "Taero! Kore ga Tokkun da!!" (Japanese: たえろ!これが特訓だ!!)	May 9, 2016	September 25, 2016 (Canada); December 12, 2016 (Australia); December 26, 2016 (United States)
At the Regionals, Shu and Wakiya Murasaki continue to win against strong rivals one after the other. Besides that, Honcho and the others tell Valt his weakpoint that he gets heated up too easily. Valt then starts special training to try and fix it, but fails constantly... However, in Valt's failed shoots, Daigo realizes something...there?
7	"Ultra Fast! Flash Shoot!!" / The Flash Launch! It's Crazy Fast! Transliteration: "Chousoku! Furasshu Shuuto!!" (Japanese: 超速!フラッシュシュート!!)	May 16, 2016	October 1, 2016 (Canada); December 13, 2016 (Australia); December 27, 2016 (United States)
Valt is suffering from his inability to use his Special Move. However, some advice from Shu inspires Valt to create a new Special Move, so he undergoes special training. Furthermore, facing his next opponent, the intensity of the battle puts Valt in a troubling situation...
8	"He's Strong! The Heavenly Horusood!!" / A Powerful Opponent! Hyper Horusood! Transliteration: "Kyōteki! Tenkū no Horusūdo!!" (Japanese: 強敵!天空のホルスード!!)	May 23, 2016	October 2, 2016 (Canada); December 14, 2016 (Australia); December 28, 2016 (United States)
Hoji's Horusood uses its Special Move, which utilises Horusood's unique features. As other rivals intently watch these two battle, why is Valt still smiling all the time!?
9	"Wyvern in the Way!" / Wyvron in the Way! Transliteration: "Tachihadakaru Waibān!" (Japanese: 立ちはだかる飛竜(ワイバーン)!)	May 30, 2016	November 26, 2016 (Canada); December 15, 2016 (Australia); December 29, 2016 (United States)
Orochi Ginba helps Nika, who got lost. Orochi, who is said to have divine hearing, finds himself interested in the sound that Valt's launches create. Furthermore Wakiya, who has started taking an interest in Valt, lures him out by ordering a delivery of bread and forcefully begins a battle!
10	"Get Over It! Believe in Your Buddy, Valkyrie!!" / Get Over It! Trust in Valtryek! Transliteration: "Norikoero! Varukirī wo Shinjite!!" (Japanese: 乗り越えろ!相棒(ヴァルキリー)を信じて!!)	June 6, 2016	December 3, 2016 (Canada); December 16, 2016 (Australia); December 30, 2016 (United States)
After being overwhelmed by Wakiya, Valt falls into a slump. Rantaro, who is worried about Valt, suggests that they have some battles for a change of pace. But, as Valt continues to be defeated in the battles, he starts to isolate himself in his room. And then, while walking down a street, Orochi sees Shu coming out of a hospital...!
11	"Spriggan's Despair!" / Spryzen's Despair! Transliteration: "Zetsubō no Supurigan" (Japanese: 絶望のスプリガン)	June 13, 2016	December 10, 2016 (Canada); December 19, 2016 (Australia); January 2, 2017 (United States)
When Valt's finds out about Shu's predicament, he takes it too far trying to help him in any way he can. Later, when, during the semifinals, Valt's friends (including Valt) wonder; can Valt keep his promise to Shu and make it to the finals...?
12	"The Miraculous Shield Crush!" / Shield Crash Menace! Transliteration: "Kyōi no Shīrudo Kurasshu!" (Japanese: 驚異のシールドクラッシュ!)	June 20, 2016	December 17, 2016 (Canada); December 20, 2016 (Australia); January 3, 2017 (United States)
As Valt and Wakiya's battle continues, not only does the battle grow more and more intense every time, so does Wakiya's anger for not being able to burst Valtryek yet, and somehow, even Valt's enthusiasm increases throughout the match, despite the ups and downs. But as they battle, turns out not only was Wakiya holding back, but so was Valt...!
13	"Shu's Test!"; Transliteration: "Shu no Shiren!" (Japanese: シュウの試練!)	June 27, 2016	December 21, 2016 (Australia); January 4, 2017 (United States)
As the other round of the semifinals between Shu and Orochi continues, Shu finds out that not only did he underestimate Orochi, but his injury as well. And during the celebration from Valt's friends, Valt finally finds out that Shu's injury was a lot worse than he thought...!
14	"The Promised Battle!" / The Battle We Promised! Transliteration: "Chikai no Batoru!" (Japanese: 誓いの決勝戦(バトル)!)	July 4, 2016	December 22, 2016 (Australia); January 5, 2017 (United States)
As the finals grow closer and closer, Valt finds himself with a tough decision to make; follow through his promise and battle in the finals, or protect his friend and giving him the time he desperately needs.
15	"Fierce Fight! Valkyrie vs Spriggan!!" / A Fierce Battle! Valtryek Versus Spryzen! Transliteration: "Gekitō! Varukirī VS Supurigan!!" (Japanese: 激闘!ヴァルキリーVSスプリガン!!)	July 11, 2016	December 23, 2016 (Australia); January 6, 2017 (United States)
The finals continue, growing fiercer by the minute. It's Valt Aoi, Victory Valtryek, & it's moves Rush Launch, Flash Launch, the upgrade move Ultra Flash Launch & a combined move, Ultra Flash Rush Launch, vs Shu Kurenai, Storm Spryzen, & it's move Counter Break, along with a new move, the Upper Launch and the upgrade move, Ultra Counter Break.
16	"Surprise! Xhakuenji Special!!" / A Group Lesson! Shakadera Special! Transliteration: "Kyōgaku! Shakuenji Supesharu!!" (Japanese: 驚愕!灼炎寺スペシャル!!)	July 18, 2016	December 26, 2016 (Australia); January 9, 2017 (United States)
Knowing that Shu was going to Xander Shakadera's grandfather's house, Valt and his friends go on an amazing trip to go there. When they arrived, Xander Shakadera shows them a bey stadium like non other and challenge them to a battle
17	"Xtreme Xcalibur!" / Extreme Xcalius! Transliteration: "Gōketsu no Ekusukaribā!" (Japanese: 豪傑のエクスカリバー!)	July 25, 2016	December 27, 2016 (Australia); January 10, 2017 (United States)
18	"Fired Up! Team Battle!!" / Team Battle! It's Off the Hook! Transliteration: "Moeru ze! Chīmu Batoru!!" (Japanese: 燃えるぜ！チームバトル!!)	August 1, 2016	December 28, 2016 (Australia); January 11, 2017 (United States)
19	"Ragnaruk VS Unicorn!" / Roktavor VS Unicrest! Transliteration: "Ragunaruku VS Unikōn!" (Japanese: ラグナルクVSユニコーン！)	August 8, 2016	December 23, 2016 (Australia); February 25, 2017 (United States)
20	"Connect! Chain Shoot!!!" / Bring it Together! Chain Launch! Transliteration: "Tsunagero! Chēn Shūto!!" (Japanese: 繋げろ！チェーンシュート！！)	August 15, 2016	December 24, 2016 (Australia); March 4, 2017 (United States)
21	"A Battle of Friendship!"; Transliteration: "Yūjō no Batoru!" (Japanese: 友情のバトル！)	August 22, 2016	January 30, 2017 (Australia); March 11, 2017 (United States)
22	"Valkyrie Awakening!!" / Valtryek Awakens! Transliteration: "Varukirī Kakusei!!" (Japanese: ヴァルキリー覚醒！！)	August 29, 2016	January 31, 2017 (Australia); March 18, 2017 (United States)
23	"Lonely Deathscyther" / Lonely Doomscizor! Transliteration: "Kodoku no Desusaizā" (Japanese: 孤独のデスサイザー)	September 5, 2016	February 1, 2017 (Australia); March 25, 2017 (United States)
Valt and all of his friends made it through the first round. They practice very hard for the next round. Though, in the middle of that atmosphere, there something that's bugging Daigo. But who?
24	"Seriously the Best!!" / Full Strength, For Real! Transliteration: "Maji to Zenryoku!!" (Japanese: 本気(マジ)と全力!!)	September 12, 2016	February 2, 2017 (Australia); April 1, 2017 (United States)
25	"The Mysterious Beyblade Mask!" / The Mysterious Masked Blader! Transliteration: "Nazo no Beiburēdo Kamen!" (Japanese: 謎のベイブレード仮面!)	September 19, 2016	February 3, 2017 (Australia); April 8, 2017 (United States)
26	"It's Decided! We're Participating in Nationals!!" / Let's Do This Thing! Transliteration: "Kimeru ze! Zenkoku Shutsujō!!" (Japanese: 決めるぜ!全国出場!!)	September 26, 2016	February 6, 2017 (Australia); April 15, 2017 (United States)
27	"It's Training Camp! The Viking Stadium!!" / Training Camp! The Biting Stadium! Transliteration: "Gasshuku da! Baikingu Sutajiamu!!" (Japanese: 合宿だ!バイキングスタジアム!!)	October 3, 2016	April 22, 2017 (United States)
28	"The Mountains! The Rivers! A Turbulent Adventure!!" / Mountains! Rivers! A Huge Stormy Adventure! Transliteration: "Yama da! Kawa da! Arashi no Daibōken!!" (Japanese: 山だ!川だ!嵐の大冒険!!)	October 10, 2016	April 29, 2017 (United States)
29	"Aim to Be Number 1!" / Eye on the Prize! Transliteration: "Mezasu ze Nanbā Wan!" (Japanese: 目指すぜNo．1！)	October 17, 2016	May 6, 2017 (United States)
30	"The Winged Serpent! Quetzalcoatl!!" / The Winged Snake! Quetziko! Transliteration: "Hebi no Tsubasa! Ketsuarukatoru!!" (Japanese: 蛇の翼!ケツァルカトル!!)	October 24, 2016	May 13, 2017 (United States)
31	"Amaterios' Guidance" / Teachings of a Legend! Transliteration: "Amateriosu no Michibiki" (Japanese: アマテリオスの導き)	October 31, 2016	May 20, 2017 (United States)
32	"The Shocking Cyclone!" / Cyclone Power! Transliteration: "Shōgeki no Saikuron!" (Japanese: 衝撃のサイクロン!)	November 7, 2016	May 27, 2017 (United States)
33	"Explosive! Double Impact!!" / Mega Flames! Dual Sabers! Transliteration: "Bakuen! Daburu Inpakuto!!" (Japanese: 爆炎!ダブルインパクト!!)	November 14, 2016	July 1, 2017 (United States)
34	"Beasts' Fangs!" / The Beasts Bare Their Fangs! Transliteration: "Kiba o muku Bīsutsu!" (Japanese: 牙をむくビースツ!)	November 21, 2016	July 8, 2017 (United States)
35	"Wild Beast! Beast Behemoth!!" / Primal Attack! Beast Betromoth! Transliteration: "Yajū! Bīsuto Behīmosu!!" (Japanese: 野獣!ビーストベヒーモス!!)	November 28, 2016	July 15, 2017 (United States)
36	"The Threatening Ride-Out!" / Rideout Rising! Transliteration: "Raidoauto no Kyōi!" (Japanese: ライドアウトの脅威!)	December 5, 2016	July 22, 2017 (United States)
37	"Our Final Battle!" / Next Stop, Team Finals! Transliteration: "Ore tachi no Kesshōsen!" (Japanese: オレたちの決勝戦！)	December 12, 2016	July 29, 2017 (United States)
38	"A Deadly Struggle! The Battle with Longinus!!" / Battle to the Finish! Lost Luinor! Transliteration: "Shitō! Ronginusu to no Tatakai!!" (Japanese: 死闘！ロンギヌスとの戦い！！)	December 19, 2016	August 5, 2017 (United States)
39	"The Explosive Death Spiral!!" / Into the Vortex! Lost Spiral! Transliteration: "Bakuretsu! Desu Supairaru!!" (Japanese: 爆裂！デススパイラル！！)	December 26, 2016	August 19, 2017 (United States)
40	"Let's Take the Nationals!!" / All In! Going Solo! Transliteration: "Toru zeh! Zenkokuichi!!" (Japanese: とるぜっ！全国一!!)	January 9, 2017	August 26, 2017 (United States)
41	"Neptune's Trap" / Nepstrius' Trap! Transliteration: "Nepuchūn no Wana" (Japanese: ネプチューンの罠)	January 16, 2017	September 2, 2017 (United States)
42	"The Venomous Serpent! Jormungand!!" / Jumbo Jormuntor! The Venomous Snake! Transliteration: "Dokuhebi! Yorumungando!!" (Japanese: 毒蛇!ヨルムンガンド!!)	January 23, 2017	September 3, 2017 (Australia); September 9, 2017 (United States)
Shu and Jin face off in a match. While Shu works on beating Jin, Naoki plans something to interrupt the match.
43	"The Hurricane Jet Shoot!" / Winged Launch! Transliteration: "Shippu no Jetto Shūto!" (Japanese: 疾風のジェットシュート!)	January 30, 2017	September 9, 2017 (Australia); September 16, 2017 (United States)
44	"Howl! Beast Battle!!" / Roar! Battle of the Beasts! Transliteration: "Hoero! Bīsuto Batoru!!" (Japanese: 吠えろ!ビーストバトル!!)	February 6, 2017	September 10, 2017 (Australia); September 23, 2017 (United States)
45	"Spriggan VS Wyvern!" / Spryzen vs. Wyvron; Transliteration: "Supurigan VS Waibān!" (Japanese: スプリガンVSワイバーン!)	February 13, 2017	September 16, 2017 (Australia); September 30, 2017 (United States)
46	"Fierce Combat! Valt VS Xhaka!!" / Battle for the Top! Valt vs Xander; Transliteration: "Nettō! Baruto VS Shaka!!" (Japanese: 熱闘!バルトVSシャカ!!)	February 20, 2017	September 17, 2017 (Australia); October 7, 2017 (United States)
47	"Star Battle!!" / Star Battle! Transliteration: "Sutā ☆ Batoru!!" (Japanese: スター☆バトル!!)	February 27, 2017	September 23, 2017 (Australia); October 14, 2017 (United States)
48	"Explosive Spin VS Runaway Dash!!" / Semi-Finals! Spin vs. Speed; Transliteration: "Bakuten VS Bakusō!!" (Japanese: 爆転VS爆走!!)	March 6, 2017	September 24, 2017 (Australia); October 21, 2017 (United States)
It's Valt VS Zac in the semi-finals of the Japan National Tournament. While Valt tries to perfect his Sprint Boost on beating Zac, Shu gets ready to face his old rival Lui Shirosagi. While both matches are underway and the finals in reach, can Valt and Shu make the promise it to the finals?
49	"Spin Emperors! Lui VS Shu!!" / Old Rivals! Lui vs. Shu! Transliteration: "Shitennou! Rui VS Shu!!" (Japanese: 四転皇!ルイVSシュウ!!)	March 13, 2017	September 30, 2017 (Australia); October 28, 2017 (United States)
50	"Defeat Him! The Absolute Champion!!" / Overthrowing the King! Transliteration: "Taosu ze! Zettai Ōja!!" (Japanese: 倒すぜ!絶対王者!!)	March 20, 2017	October 1, 2017 (Australia); November 4, 2017 (United States)
51	"Let's Finish It! Valkyrie!!" / Final Showdown! Victory Valtryek! Transliteration: "Kimero! Varukirī!!" (Japanese: 決めろ! ヴァルキリー!!)	March 27, 2017	October 7, 2017 (Australia); November 11, 2017 (United States)
