= List of Beyblade Burst episodes =

Beyblade Burst is a Japanese manga and anime and third series of the franchise. It was adapted by OLM and aired on all TXN stations in Japan.

== Series overview ==
Season	Episodes	Originally released		
Season	Episodes	First released	Last released	Network
1	51	April 4, 2016	March 27, 2017	TXN (TV Tokyo)
2	51	April 3, 2017	March 26, 2018	TXN (TV Tokyo)
3	51	April 2, 2018	March 25, 2019	TXN (TV Tokyo)
4	52 (Japanese version); 26 (English version)	April 5, 2019	March 27, 2020	YouTube
5	52 (Japanese version); 26 (English version)	April 3, 2020	March 19, 2021	YouTube
6	52 (Japanese version); 26 (English version)	April 2, 2021	March 18, 2022	YouTube
7	26	April 3, 2023	December 2, 2023	Disney XD

== Episode list ==
=== Beyblade Burst (2016–17) ===
No.	Japanese Translated title/English title	Original release date	English air date
1	"Let's Go! Valkyrie!" / Let's Go! Valtryek! Transliteration: "Ikō ze! Varukirī!!" (Japanese: 行こうぜ!相棒(ヴァルキリー)!!)	April 4, 2016	September 10, 2016 (Canada); December 5, 2016 (Australia); December 19, 2016 (United States)
2	"Guard Dog Of The Underworld! Kerbeus!!" / Kerbeus: Guard Dog of the Underworld! Transliteration: "Meikai no Banken! Kerubeusu!!!" (Japanese: 冥界の番犬！ケルベウス！！)	April 11, 2016	September 11, 2016 (Canada); December 6, 2016 (Australia); December 20, 2016 (United States)
3	"Explosive! Rush Shoot!" / Blast-Off! Rush Launch! Transliteration: "Bakuretsu! Rasshu Shūto!!" (Japanese: 爆裂!ラッシュシュート!!)	April 18, 2016	September 17, 2016 (Canada); December 7, 2016 (Australia); December 21, 2016 (United States)
4	"Let's Create A Beyblade Club!" / Beyblade Club: Let's Get Started! Transliteration: "Beiburēdo Kurabu wo Tsukuru ze!" (Japanese: ベイブレードクラブをつくるぜ!)	April 25, 2016	September 18, 2016 (Canada); December 8, 2016 (Australia); December 22, 2016 (United States)
5	"The Grim Reaper Descends! The Jet-Black Deathscyther!!" / Into the Darkness! Dark Doomscizor! Transliteration: "Shinigami Kōrin! Shikkoku no Desusaizā!!" (Japanese: 死神降臨!漆黒のデスサイザー!!)	May 2, 2016	September 24, 2016 (Canada); December 9, 2016 (Australia); December 23, 2016 (United States)
6	"Keep It Together! This Is Special Training!!" / Get Ready! Crash Course! Transliteration: "Taero! Kore ga Tokkun da!!" (Japanese: たえろ!これが特訓だ!!)	May 9, 2016	September 25, 2016 (Canada); December 12, 2016 (Australia); December 26, 2016 (United States)
7	"Ultra Fast! Flash Shoot!!" / The Flash Launch! It's Crazy Fast! Transliteration: "Chousoku! Furasshu Shuuto!!" (Japanese: 超速!フラッシュシュート!!)	May 16, 2016	October 1, 2016 (Canada); December 13, 2016 (Australia); December 27, 2016 (United States)
8	"He's Strong! The Heavenly Horusood!!" / A Powerful Opponent! Hyper Horusood! Transliteration: "Kyōteki! Tenkū no Horusūdo!!" (Japanese: 強敵!天空のホルスード!!)	May 23, 2016	October 2, 2016 (Canada); December 14, 2016 (Australia); December 28, 2016 (United States)
9	"Wyvern in the Way!" / Wyvron in the Way! Transliteration: "Tachihadakaru Waibān!" (Japanese: 立ちはだかる飛竜(ワイバーン)!)	May 30, 2016	November 26, 2016 (Canada); December 15, 2016 (Australia); December 29, 2016 (United States)
10	"Get Over It! Believe in Your Buddy, Valkyrie!!" / Get Over It! Trust in Valtryek! Transliteration: "Norikoero! Varukirī wo Shinjite!!" (Japanese: 乗り越えろ!相棒(ヴァルキリー)を信じて!!)	June 6, 2016	December 3, 2016 (Canada); December 16, 2016 (Australia); December 30, 2016 (United States)
11	"Spriggan's Despair!" / Spryzen's Despair! Transliteration: "Zetsubō no Supurigan" (Japanese: 絶望のスプリガン)	June 13, 2016	December 10, 2016 (Canada); December 19, 2016 (Australia); January 2, 2017 (United States)
12	"The Miraculous Shield Crush!" / Shield Crash Menace! Transliteration: "Kyōi no Shīrudo Kurasshu!" (Japanese: 驚異のシールドクラッシュ!)	June 20, 2016	December 17, 2016 (Canada); December 20, 2016 (Australia); January 3, 2017 (United States)
13	"Shu's Test!"; Transliteration: "Shu no Shiren!" (Japanese: シュウの試練!)	June 27, 2016	December 21, 2016 (Australia); January 4, 2017 (United States)
14	"The Promised Battle!" / The Battle We Promised! Transliteration: "Chikai no Batoru!" (Japanese: 誓いの決勝戦(バトル)!)	July 4, 2016	December 22, 2016 (Australia); January 5, 2017 (United States)
15	"Fierce Fight! Valkyrie vs Spriggan!!" / A Fierce Battle! Valtryek Versus Spryzen! Transliteration: "Gekitō! Varukirī VS Supurigan!!" (Japanese: 激闘!ヴァルキリーVSスプリガン!!)	July 11, 2016	December 23, 2016 (Australia); January 6, 2017 (United States)
16	"Surprise! Xhakuenji Special!!" / A Group Lesson! Shakadera Special! Transliteration: "Kyōgaku! Shakuenji Supesharu!!" (Japanese: 驚愕!灼炎寺スペシャル!!)	July 18, 2016	December 26, 2016 (Australia); January 9, 2017 (United States)
17	"Xtreme Xcalibur!" / Extreme Xcalius! Transliteration: "Gōketsu no Ekusukaribā!" (Japanese: 豪傑のエクスカリバー!)	July 25, 2016	December 27, 2016 (Australia); January 10, 2017 (United States)
18	"Fired Up! Team Battle!!" / Team Battle! It's Off the Hook! Transliteration: "Moeru ze! Chīmu Batoru!!" (Japanese: 燃えるぜ！チームバトル!!)	August 1, 2016	December 28, 2016 (Australia); January 11, 2017 (United States)
19	"Ragnaruk VS Unicorn!" / Roktavor VS Unicrest! Transliteration: "Ragunaruku VS Unikōn!" (Japanese: ラグナルクVSユニコーン！)	August 8, 2016	December 23, 2016 (Australia); February 25, 2017 (United States)
20	"Connect! Chain Shoot!!!" / Bring it Together! Chain Launch! Transliteration: "Tsunagero! Chēn Shūto!!" (Japanese: 繋げろ！チェーンシュート！！)	August 15, 2016	December 24, 2016 (Australia); March 4, 2017 (United States)
21	"A Battle of Friendship!"; Transliteration: "Yūjō no Batoru!" (Japanese: 友情のバトル！)	August 22, 2016	January 30, 2017 (Australia); March 11, 2017 (United States)
22	"Valkyrie Awakening!!" / Valtryek Awakens! Transliteration: "Varukirī Kakusei!!" (Japanese: ヴァルキリー覚醒！！)	August 29, 2016	January 31, 2017 (Australia); March 18, 2017 (United States)
23	"Lonely Deathscyther" / Lonely Doomscizor! Transliteration: "Kodoku no Desusaizā" (Japanese: 孤独のデスサイザー)	September 5, 2016	February 1, 2017 (Australia); March 25, 2017 (United States)
24	"Seriously the Best!!" / Full Strength, For Real! Transliteration: "Maji to Zenryoku!!" (Japanese: 本気(マジ)と全力!!)	September 12, 2016	February 2, 2017 (Australia); April 1, 2017 (United States)
25	"The Mysterious Beyblade Mask!" / The Mysterious Masked Blader! Transliteration: "Nazo no Beiburēdo Kamen!" (Japanese: 謎のベイブレード仮面!)	September 19, 2016	February 3, 2017 (Australia); April 8, 2017 (United States)
26	"It's Decided! We're Participating in Nationals!!" / Let's Do This Thing! Transliteration: "Kimeru ze! Zenkoku Shutsujō!!" (Japanese: 決めるぜ!全国出場!!)	September 26, 2016	February 6, 2017 (Australia); April 15, 2017 (United States)
27	"It's Training Camp! The Viking Stadium!!" / Training Camp! The Biting Stadium! Transliteration: "Gasshuku da! Baikingu Sutajiamu!!" (Japanese: 合宿だ!バイキングスタジアム!!)	October 3, 2016	April 22, 2017 (United States)
28	"The Mountains! The Rivers! A Turbulent Adventure!!" / Mountains! Rivers! A Huge Stormy Adventure! Transliteration: "Yama da! Kawa da! Arashi no Daibōken!!" (Japanese: 山だ!川だ!嵐の大冒険!!)	October 10, 2016	April 29, 2017 (United States)
29	"Aim to Be Number 1!" / Eye on the Prize! Transliteration: "Mezasu ze Nanbā Wan!" (Japanese: 目指すぜNo．1！)	October 17, 2016	May 6, 2017 (United States)
30	"The Winged Serpent! Quetzalcoatl!!" / The Winged Snake! Quetziko! Transliteration: "Hebi no Tsubasa! Ketsuarukatoru!!" (Japanese: 蛇の翼!ケツァルカトル!!)	October 24, 2016	May 13, 2017 (United States)
31	"Amaterios' Guidance" / Teachings of a Legend! Transliteration: "Amateriosu no Michibiki" (Japanese: アマテリオスの導き)	October 31, 2016	May 20, 2017 (United States)
32	"The Shocking Cyclone!" / Cyclone Power! Transliteration: "Shōgeki no Saikuron!" (Japanese: 衝撃のサイクロン!)	November 7, 2016	May 27, 2017 (United States)
33	"Explosive! Double Impact!!" / Mega Flames! Dual Sabers! Transliteration: "Bakuen! Daburu Inpakuto!!" (Japanese: 爆炎!ダブルインパクト!!)	November 14, 2016	July 1, 2017 (United States)
34	"Beasts' Fangs!" / The Beasts Bare Their Fangs! Transliteration: "Kiba o muku Bīsutsu!" (Japanese: 牙をむくビースツ!)	November 21, 2016	July 8, 2017 (United States)
35	"Wild Beast! Beast Behemoth!!" / Primal Attack! Beast Betromoth! Transliteration: "Yajū! Bīsuto Behīmosu!!" (Japanese: 野獣!ビーストベヒーモス!!)	November 28, 2016	July 15, 2017 (United States)
36	"The Threatening Ride-Out!" / Rideout Rising! Transliteration: "Raidoauto no Kyōi!" (Japanese: ライドアウトの脅威!)	December 5, 2016	July 22, 2017 (United States)
37	"Our Final Battle!" / Next Stop, Team Finals! Transliteration: "Ore tachi no Kesshōsen!" (Japanese: オレたちの決勝戦！)	December 12, 2016	July 29, 2017 (United States)
38	"A Deadly Struggle! The Battle with Longinus!!" / Battle to the Finish! Lost Luinor! Transliteration: "Shitō! Ronginusu to no Tatakai!!" (Japanese: 死闘！ロンギヌスとの戦い！！)	December 19, 2016	August 5, 2017 (United States)
39	"The Explosive Death Spiral!!" / Into the Vortex! Lost Spiral! Transliteration: "Bakuretsu! Desu Supairaru!!" (Japanese: 爆裂！デススパイラル！！)	December 26, 2016	August 19, 2017 (United States)
40	"Let's Take the Nationals!!" / All In! Going Solo! Transliteration: "Toru zeh! Zenkokuichi!!" (Japanese: とるぜっ！全国一!!)	January 9, 2017	August 26, 2017 (United States)
41	"Neptune's Trap" / Nepstrius' Trap! Transliteration: "Nepuchūn no Wana" (Japanese: ネプチューンの罠)	January 16, 2017	September 2, 2017 (United States)
42	"The Venomous Serpent! Jormungand!!" / Jumbo Jormuntor! The Venomous Snake! Transliteration: "Dokuhebi! Yorumungando!!" (Japanese: 毒蛇!ヨルムンガンド!!)	January 23, 2017	September 3, 2017 (Australia); September 9, 2017 (United States)
43	"The Hurricane Jet Shoot!" / Winged Launch! Transliteration: "Shippu no Jetto Shūto!" (Japanese: 疾風のジェットシュート!)	January 30, 2017	September 9, 2017 (Australia); September 16, 2017 (United States)
44	"Howl! Beast Battle!!" / Roar! Battle of the Beasts! Transliteration: "Hoero! Bīsuto Batoru!!" (Japanese: 吠えろ!ビーストバトル!!)	February 6, 2017	September 10, 2017 (Australia); September 23, 2017 (United States)
45	"Spriggan VS Wyvern!" / Spryzen vs. Wyvron; Transliteration: "Supurigan VS Waibān!" (Japanese: スプリガンVSワイバーン!)	February 13, 2017	September 16, 2017 (Australia); September 30, 2017 (United States)
46	"Fierce Combat! Valt VS Xhaka!!" / Battle for the Top! Valt vs Xander; Transliteration: "Nettō! Baruto VS Shaka!!" (Japanese: 熱闘!バルトVSシャカ!!)	February 20, 2017	September 17, 2017 (Australia); October 7, 2017 (United States)
47	"Star Battle!!" / Star Battle! Transliteration: "Sutā ☆ Batoru!!" (Japanese: スター☆バトル!!)	February 27, 2017	September 23, 2017 (Australia); October 14, 2017 (United States)
48	"Explosive Spin VS Runaway Dash!!" / Semi-Finals! Spin vs. Speed; Transliteration: "Bakuten VS Bakusō!!" (Japanese: 爆転VS爆走!!)	March 6, 2017	September 24, 2017 (Australia); October 21, 2017 (United States)
49	"Spin Emperors! Lui VS Shu!!" / Old Rivals! Lui vs. Shu! Transliteration: "Shitennou! Rui VS Shu!!" (Japanese: 四転皇!ルイVSシュウ!!)	March 13, 2017	September 30, 2017 (Australia); October 28, 2017 (United States)
50	"Defeat Him! The Absolute Champion!!" / Overthrowing the King! Transliteration: "Taosu ze! Zettai Ōja!!" (Japanese: 倒すぜ!絶対王者!!)	March 20, 2017	October 1, 2017 (Australia); November 4, 2017 (United States)
51	"Let's Finish It! Valkyrie!!" / Final Showdown! Victory Valtryek! Transliteration: "Kimero! Varukirī!!" (Japanese: 決めろ! ヴァルキリー!!)	March 27, 2017	October 7, 2017 (Australia); November 11, 2017 (United States)

=== Beyblade Burst Evolution (2017–18) ===
No. overall	No. in season	Japanese Translated title/English title	Original release date	English air date
52	1	"To the World! Valkyrie's Evolution!!" / Fresh Start! Valtryek's Evolution! Transliteration: "Sekai e! Varukirī Shinka!!" (Japanese: 世界へ!ヴァルキリー進化!!)	April 3, 2017	November 4, 2017 (Canada); December 4, 2017 (United States)
53	2	"Manly Spirit! Blaze Ragnarok!!" / Fighting Spirit! Berserk Roktavor! Transliteration: "Otoko Tamashi! Bureizu Ragunaruku!!" (Japanese: 男魂!ブレイズラグナルク!!)	April 10, 2017	November 5, 2017 (Canada); December 5, 2017 (United States)
54	3	"Shock! Drain Fafnir!!" / Drain Fafnir! Winding Up! Transliteration: "Shōgeki! Dorein Fabuniru!!" (Japanese: 衝撃!ドレインファブニル!!)	April 17, 2017	November 11, 2017 (Canada); December 6, 2017 (United States)
55	4	"Whirlwind! Tornado Wyvern!!" / Whirlwind! Tempest Wyvron! Transliteration: "Senpū! Torunēdo Waibān!!" (Japanese: 旋風!トルネードワイバーン!!)	April 24, 2017	November 12, 2017 (Canada); December 7, 2017 (United States)
56	5	"Surprise Attack! Kinetic Satomb!" / Demonic Attack! Kreis Satan!! Transliteration: "Mashū! Kureis Satan!!" (Japanese: 魔襲!クライスサタン!!)	May 1, 2017	November 18, 2017 (Canada); December 8, 2017 (United States)
57	6	"Severe Earthquake! BC Sol!!" / Squad Shake Up! Transliteration: "Gekishin! BC Sol!!" (Japanese: 激震!BCソル!!)	May 8, 2017	November 19, 2017 (Canada); December 9, 2017 (United States)
58	7	"Reach It! The Top Team!!" / Journey to the Top! Transliteration: "Tsukame! Toppu Chīmu!!" (Japanese: 掴め!トップチーム!!)	May 15, 2017	November 25, 2017 (Canada); December 11, 2017 (United States)
59	8	"It Begins! The Europe League!!" / Season Opener! European League; Transliteration: "Kaimaku! Yōroppa Rīgu!!" (Japanese: 開幕!ヨーロッパリーグ!!)	May 22, 2017	November 26, 2017 (Canada); December 12, 2017 (United States)
60	9	"Time God! Alter Chronos!!" / Alter Cognite! The Shape Shifter! Transliteration: "Tokigami! Arutā Kuronosu!!" (Japanese: 時神!アルタークロノス!!)	May 29, 2017	December 2, 2017 (Canada); December 13, 2017 (United States)
61	10	"Valt and Free" / Free to Launch; Transliteration: "Baruto to Furī" (Japanese: バルトとフリー)	June 5, 2017	December 3, 2017 (Canada); December 14, 2017 (United States)
62	11	"The Collapse of BC Sol!!" / BC Sol: A Team Divided; Transliteration: "Hōkai! BC Soru!!" (Japanese: 崩壊!BCソル!!)	June 12, 2017	December 9, 2017 (Canada); December 15, 2017 (United States)
63	12	"Deathscyther's Rebirth!" / The Return of Doomscizor; Transliteration: "Desu Saizā Sairin!" (Japanese: 死神（デスサイザー）再臨!)	June 19, 2017	December 10, 2017 (Canada); December 16, 2017 (United States)
64	13	"Twin Scythes! Double Strike!"; Transliteration: "Sōkama! Daburu Sutoraiku!!" (Japanese: 双鎌!ダブルストライク!!)	June 26, 2017	December 16, 2017 (Canada); January 13, 2018 (United States)
65	14	"Charge! Maximum Garuda!!" / Attack! Maximus Garuda! Transliteration: "Shūgeki! Makishimamu Garūda!!" (Japanese: 蹴撃!マキシマムガルーダ!!)	July 3, 2017	December 17, 2017 (Canada); January 20, 2018 (United States)
66	15	"The Bird God Blader, Ghasem!!" / Ghasem! The Airborne Blader! Transliteration: "Torigami Burēdā Gazemu!!" (Japanese: 鳥神闘士（ブレーダー）ガゼム!!)	July 10, 2017	December 23, 2017 (Canada); January 27, 2018 (United States)
67	16	"Finding Shu" / The Search For Shu; Transliteration: "Shū wo Sagase" (Japanese: シュウを探せ)	July 17, 2017	December 24, 2017 (Canada); February 3, 2018 (United States)
68	17	"The Devil in the Snake Pit!!" / Shadow Magic! The Snake Pit!! Transliteration: "Makyō! Sunēku Pitto!!" (Japanese: 魔境!スネークピット!!)	July 24, 2017	February 10, 2018 (United States)
69	18	"Into the Labyrinth! The Black Dungeon!!" / The Underground Maze! Transliteration: "Meikyū! Burakku Danjon!!" (Japanese: 迷宮!ブラックダンジョン!!)	July 31, 2017	February 17, 2018 (United States)
70	19	"Fire God! Red Eye!!" / Secret Fire! Red Eye!! Transliteration: "Enshin! Reddo Ai!!" (Japanese: 炎神!レッドアイ!!)	August 7, 2017	February 24, 2018 (United States)
71	20	"Explosion! BC Sol!!" / New Teammates! New Rivals! Transliteration: "Bakushin! BC Sol!!" (Japanese: 爆進!BCソル!!)	August 14, 2017	March 3, 2018 (United States)
72	21	"Joshua VS Space Ninja!" / Joshua vs. the Space Ninjas! Transliteration: "Joshua VS Supēsu Ninja" (Japanese: ジョシュアVS宇宙（スペース）忍者)	August 21, 2017	March 10, 2018 (United States)
73	22	"Blast Jinnius Calling a Storm!" / Blast Jinnius! Caller of Storms! Transliteration: "Arashi o Yobu Burasuto Jiniusu!" (Japanese: 嵐を呼ぶブラストジニウス!)	August 28, 2017	March 17, 2018 (United States)
74	23	"A Challenge! The Infinity Beystadium!!" / Infinity Stadium! Raul's Challenge! Transliteration: "Chōsen! Mugen Beisutajiamu!!" (Japanese: 挑戦!無限ベイスタジアム!!)	September 4, 2017	March 24, 2018 (United States)
75	24	"Turmoil! The World League!!" / World League! Setting the Stage! Transliteration: "Gekidō! Wārudo Rīgu!!" (Japanese: 激動!ワールドリーグ!!)	September 11, 2017	March 31, 2018 (United States)
76	25	"Showdown! Sieg Xcalibur!" / Showdown! Surge Xcalius! Transliteration: "Tōken! JĪgu Ekusukaribā!!" (Japanese: 闘剣!ジークエクスカリバー!!)	September 18, 2017	April 7, 2018 (United States)
77	26	"God Reboot!!" / Genesis Reboot! Transliteration: "Bakuretsu! Goddo Ribūto!!" (Japanese: 炸裂!ゴッドリブート!!)	September 25, 2017	April 14, 2018 (United States)
78	27	"Tokyo Battle! Real VS Rios!!" / Worlds Collide! Home Turf! Transliteration: "Tōkyō Batoru! Rearu VS Riosu!!" (Japanese: 東京バトル!レアルVSリオス!!)	October 2, 2017	April 21, 2018 (United States)
79	28	"Vampire! Deep Chaos" / Vampire! Deep Caynox! Transliteration: "Kyūketsuki! Dīpu Kaosu!!" (Japanese: 吸血鬼!ディープカオス!!)	October 9, 2017	April 28, 2018 (United States)
80	29	"Fortress! Shelter Regulus!" / The Fortress! Shelter Regulus! Transliteration: "Yōsai! Sherutā Regurusu!!" (Japanese: 要塞!シェルターレグルス!!)	October 16, 2017	May 5, 2018 (United States)
81	30	"Clash! Shoot to the Finals!!" / Collision Course! To the Finals! Transliteration: "Gekitotsu! Kesshō he no Shūto!!" (Japanese: 激突!決勝へのシュート!!)	October 23, 2017	May 12, 2018 (United States)
82	31	"Collapse! The Big 5's Wall!!" / Big 5! Breaking Through! Transliteration: "Yabure! Biggu Faibu no Kabe!!" (Japanese: 破れ!ビッグ5の壁!!)	October 30, 2017	May 19, 2018 (United States)
83	32	"Unrivaled! Triple Impact!!" / Unrivaled! Triple Saber! Transliteration: "Tenka Musou! Toriparu Inpakuto!!" (Japanese: 天下無双!トリプルインパクト!!)	November 6, 2017	July 2, 2018 (United States)
84	33	"The Finals! BC Sol VS New York Bulls!" / The World League Final! Transliteration: "Kesshō! BC Soru VS NY Buruzu!!" (Japanese: 決勝!BCソル VS NYブルズ!!)	November 13, 2017	June 9, 2018 (Canada); July 9, 2018 (United States)
85	34	"Full Power! Bound Attack!!" / Full Power! Spring Attack! Transliteration: "Zenryoku! Boundo Attaku!!" (Japanese: 全力!バウンドアタック!!)	November 20, 2017	June 10, 2018 (Canada); July 16, 2018 (United States)
86	35	"Our Final Match!" / To the Podium! Transliteration: "Ore-tachi no Kesshōsen!" (Japanese: 俺たちの決勝戦!)	November 27, 2017	June 16, 2018 (Canada); July 23, 2018 (United States)
87	36	"Duel! Longinus VS Spriggan!" / Luinor VS Spryzen; Transliteration: "Kettō! Ronginusu VS Supurigan!" (Japanese: 決闘!ロンギヌスVSスプリガン!)	December 4, 2017	June 17, 2018 (Canada); July 30, 2018 (United States)
88	37	"Let's Go! The God Bladers Cup!!" / The Challenge of Champions! Transliteration: "Iku ze! Goddo Burēdāzu Kappu!!" (Japanese: いくぜっ!ゴッドブレーダーズカップ!!)	December 11, 2017	June 23, 2018 (Canada); August 6, 2018 (United States)
89	38	"Deadly Weapon! Spriggan Requiem!!" / Requiem Project! Spryzen Unleashed! Transliteration: "Kyōki! Supurigan Rekuiemu!!" (Japanese: 凶機!スプリガンレクイエム!!)	December 18, 2017	June 24, 2018 (Canada); August 13, 2018 (United States)
90	39	"The Underground Battle Emperor, Kurtz!" / Emperor of the Underground; Transliteration: "Chika Batoru Kōtei Kurutsu!" (Japanese: 地下バトル皇帝クルツ!)	December 25, 2017	June 30, 2018 (Canada); August 25, 2018 (United States)
91	40	"Tyrant! Beat Kukulcan!!" / Bow Down! Boom Khalzar! Transliteration: "Bōkun! Bīto Kukurukan!!" (Japanese: 暴君!ビートククルカン!!)	January 8, 2018	July 21, 2018 (Canada); September 1, 2018 (United States)
92	41	"Iron Hammer! Twin Nemesis!!" / Colossus Hammer! Twin Noctemis! Transliteration: "Tettsui! Tsuin Nemeshisu!!" (Japanese: 鉄槌!ツインネメシス!!)	January 15, 2018	July 22, 2018 (Canada); September 8, 2018 (United States)
93	42	"BC Sol's Fierce Battle!!" / BC Sol Scorcher! Transliteration: "Shiretsu! BC Soru no Tatakai!!" (Japanese: 熾烈!BCソルの闘い!!)	January 22, 2018	July 28, 2018 (Canada); September 15, 2018 (United States)
94	43	"Climax! Rival Great Clash!!" / White Hot Rivals; Transliteration: "Hakunetsu! Raibaru Daigekitotsu!!" (Japanese: 白熱!ライバル大激突!!)	January 29, 2018	July 29, 2018 (Canada); September 22, 2018 (United States)
95	44	"Super Evolution! Strike God Valkyrie!!" / Epic Evolution! Strike Valtryek! Transliteration: "Choushinka! Sutoraiku Goddo Varukirii!!" (Japanese: 超進化!ストライクゴッドヴァルキリー!!)	February 5, 2018	August 4, 2018 (Canada); September 29, 2018 (United States)
96	45	"Spriggan the God of Destruction!" / Spryzen the Destroyer! Transliteration: "Hakaishin Supurigan!" (Japanese: 破壊神スプリガン!)	February 12, 2018	August 5, 2018 (Canada); October 6, 2018 (United States)
97	46	"Beyond the Limit! Free VS Lui!!" / No Limits! Free VS Lui!! Transliteration: "Chougenkai! Furī VS Lui!!" (Japanese: 超限界!フリーVSルイ!!)	February 19, 2018	August 11, 2018 (Canada); October 13, 2018 (United States)
98	47	"The Ultimate Battle!" / Full Force! Charging up! Transliteration: "Arutimetto Batoru!" (Japanese: アルテイメットバトル!)	February 26, 2018	August 12, 2018 (Canada); October 20, 2018 (United States)
99	48	"The Decisive Battle of Friendship!!" / Teamwork! To the Semi-Finals; Transliteration: "Yūjou! Ketteisen he no Batoru!!" (Japanese: 友情!決定戦へのバトル!!)	March 5, 2018	September 8, 2018 (Canada); October 27, 2018 (United States)
100	49	"Semi-finals! Battle of Destiny!!" / The Fierce Four; Transliteration: "Junkessho! Shukumei no Batoru!!" (Japanese: 準決勝!宿命のバトル!!)	March 12, 2018	September 9, 2018 (Canada); November 3, 2018 (United States)
101	50	"Enter the Final Battle!!" / Breaking Point! Bursting Through; Transliteration: "Totsunyuu! Saishuu Kessen!!" (Japanese: 突入!最終決戦!!)	March 19, 2018	September 22, 2018 (Canada); November 10, 2018 (United States)
102	51	"Valt VS Shu!!" / A Champion is Crowned! Transliteration: "Baruto VS Shuu!!" (Japanese: バルトVSシユウ!!)	March 26, 2018	September 23, 2018 (Canada); November 17, 2018 (United States)

=== Beyblade Burst Turbo (2018–19) ===
No. overall	No. in season	Japanese Translated title/English title	Original release date	English air date
103	1	"This is a Super Z Bey!" / Time to go Turbo! Transliteration: "Kore ga Chōzetsu Bei da!!" (Japanese: これが超ゼツベイだ!!)	April 2, 2018	October 7, 2018 (Canada); December 15, 2018 (United States)
104	2	"Achilles vs Forneus!!"; Transliteration: "Akiresu VS Foruneusu!!" (Japanese: アキレスVSフォルネウス!!)	April 9, 2018	October 14, 2018 (Canada); December 16, 2018 (United States)
105	3	"The Duel at Sunset!!"; Transliteration: "Yūhi no Kettō!" (Japanese: 夕陽の決斗!!)	April 16, 2018	October 21, 2018 (Canada); December 17, 2018 (United States)
106	4	"It's Decided! Z Buster!" / Land It! Z Breaker! Transliteration: "Kimero! Zetto Basutā!" (Japanese: 決めろ!ゼットバスター!!)	April 23, 2018	October 28, 2018 (Canada); December 18, 2018 (United States)
107	5	"Super Z Showdown! Valkyrie vs. Longinus!" / Turbo Match! Valtryek Vs. Lúinor! Transliteration: "Chōzetsu Taiketsu! Varukirī VS Ronginusu!" (Japanese: 超ゼツ対決!ヴァルキリーVSロンギヌス!!)	April 30, 2018	November 4, 2018 (Canada); December 19, 2018 (United States)
108	6	"Winter Tyrant! Battle Royale!" / Winter Knight! Battle Royale! Transliteration: "Shiroki Bokkun! Batoru Roiyaru!" (Japanese: 白き暴君!バトルロイヤル!!)	May 7, 2018	November 10, 2018 (Canada); December 20, 2018 (United States)
109	7	"Open! Longinus Cup!" / Curtains Rise! The Lúinor Cup! Transliteration: "Kaimaku! Ronginusu Kappu!" (Japanese: 開幕!ロンギヌスカップ!!)	May 14, 2018	November 11, 2018 (Canada); December 21, 2018 (United States)
110	8	"Transformation! Hell Salamander!" / Transformation! Heat Salamander! Transliteration: "Hengen! Heru Saramandā!" (Japanese: 変幻!ヘルサラマンダー!!)	May 21, 2018	November 17, 2018 (Canada); December 22, 2018 (United States)
111	9	"Rage of The Blazing Tornado!" / Swirling Inferno! Transliteration: "Kaensenpū Gekiren!" (Japanese: 火炎旋風ゲキリン!)	May 28, 2018	November 18, 2018 (Canada); December 29, 2018 (United States)
112	10	"Achilles VS Ragnaruk!!" / Achilles vs. Roktavor! Transliteration: "Akiresu VS Ragnaruku!!" (Japanese: アキレスVSラグナルク!!)	June 4, 2018	November 24, 2018 (Canada); January 19, 2019 (United States)
113	11	"Battle of Betrayal!"; Transliteration: "Uragiri no Batoru!" (Japanese: 裏切りの激闘(バトル)!)	June 11, 2018	November 25, 2018 (Canada); January 26, 2019 (United States)
114	12	"The Strong Armed Hercules!" / Bull's-eye! Archer Hercules! Transliteration: "Gōwan! Herakuresu!" (Japanese: 豪腕!ヘラクレス!!)	June 18, 2018	December 1, 2018 (Canada); February 2, 2019 (United States)
115	13	"Super Z Final Battle!" / Lúinor Cup! Final Battle! Transliteration: "Chōzetsu Kesshōsen!!" (Japanese: 超ゼツ決勝戦!!)	June 25, 2018	December 2, 2018 (Canada); February 9, 2019 (United States)
116	14	"Raging Dragon! Bloody Longinus!" / Raging Dragon! Brutal Lúinor! Transliteration: "Bōryū! Buraddi Ronginusu!" (Japanese: 暴竜!ブラッディロンギヌス!!)	July 2, 2018	December 9, 2018 (Canada); February 16, 2019 (United States)
117	15	"Defeat Lui!!" / Trial By Fire! Defeat Lui! Transliteration: "Rui o taose!" (Japanese: ルイを倒せ!!)	July 9, 2018	December 10, 2018 (Canada); February 23, 2019 (United States)
118	16	"Grand Voyage! Battleship Cruise!!" / Epic Voyage! Battleship Cruise! Transliteration: "Dai kōkai! Batorushippu Kurūzu!" (Japanese: 大航海!バトルシップクルーズ!!)	July 16, 2018	January 20, 2019 (Canada); March 2, 2019 (United States)
119	17	"The Hero and the Holy Sword!!" / Sword of The Legendary Hero! Transliteration: "Yūsha to Ekusukaribā!!" (Japanese: 勇者と聖剣（エクスカリバー）!!)	July 23, 2018	January 27, 2019 (Canada); March 9, 2019 (United States)
120	18	"A Super Z Battle on a Ghost Ship!" / Ghost Ship! Adventure on The High Seas! Transliteration: "Yūrei-sen no Chōzetsu Batoru!" (Japanese: ユーレイ船の超ゼツバトル!)	July 30, 2018	February 3, 2019 (Canada); March 23, 2019 (United States)
121	19	"Fierce Fighting! The Beyathlon!" / Super Rumble! Beyathlon! Transliteration: "Daigekitō! Beasuron!" (Japanese: 大激闘!ベイアスロン!!)	August 6, 2018	February 10, 2019 (Canada); March 30, 2019 (United States)
122	20	"Ignite! Revive Phoenix!!" / Explosive Flames! Revive Phoenix! Transliteration: "Bakuen! Rivaibu Fenikkusu!!" (Japanese: 爆炎!リヴァイブフェニックス!!)	August 13, 2018	March 8, 2019 (Canada); April 6, 2019 (United States)
123	21	"Joint Struggle! Tag Battle!!" / Cooperation! Tag-Team Battle! Transliteration: "Kyōtō! Taggu Batoru!" (Japanese: 共闘!タッグバトル!!)	August 20, 2018	March 9, 2019 (Canada); April 13, 2019 (United States)
124	22	"The Raging 3-way Bey Battle!!" / Three-Way Stand-Off! Transliteration: "Dotō no san Bey Batoru!!" (Japanese: 怒涛の3ベイバトル!!)	August 27, 2018	March 15, 2019 (Canada); April 20, 2019 (United States)
125	23	"Fierce Battle! Protect Beystar!!" / Operation: Protect the Bey Stars! Transliteration: "Gekisen! Mamore Beisutā!!" (Japanese: 激戦!守れベイスター!!)	September 3, 2018	March 16, 2019 (Canada); April 27, 2019 (United States)
126	24	"Achilles vs. Xcalibur!!" / Achilles vs Xcalius! Transliteration: "Akiresu VS Ekusukaribā!" (Japanese: 勇者（アキレス）VS勇者（エクスカリバー）!!)	September 10, 2018	April 27, 2019 (Canada); May 4, 2019 (United States)
127	25	"Super Dragon! Geist Fafnir!"; Transliteration: "Chōryū!! Gaisuto Fabuniru!" (Japanese: 超竜!ガイストファブニル!!)	September 17, 2018	April 28, 2019 (Canada); May 11, 2019 (United States)
128	26	"The Heated Up Battleship!!" / The Battleship Cruise! Final Voyage! Transliteration: "Hīto Appu! Batorushippu!" (Japanese: 白熱（ヒートアップ）！バトルシップ！！)	September 24, 2018	May 4, 2019 (Canada); June 1, 2019 (United States)
129	27	"The Unrivaled Way!" / Road To Glory! Transliteration: "Tenkamusō e no michi!" (Japanese: 天下無双への道!)	October 1, 2018	May 5, 2019 (Canada); July 6, 2019 (United States)
130	28	"Valt Vs. Aiga!" / Valt Vs. Aiger! Transliteration: "Baruto VS Aiga!" (Japanese: バルトVSアイガ!!)	October 8, 2018	May 11, 2019 (Canada); July 13, 2019 (United States)
131	29	"Lord of the Underworld, Dead Hades!" / Dark Prince! Dread Hades! Transliteration: "Meikei no Maō Deddo Hadesu!" (Japanese: 冥界の魔王デッドハデス!)	October 15, 2018	May 12, 2019 (Canada); July 20, 2019 (United States)
132	30	"Aiga Goes Wild!" / Aiger Goes Wild! Transliteration: "Aiga, Araburu!" (Japanese: アイガ、荒ぶる!)	October 22, 2018	May 18, 2019 (Canada); July 27, 2019 (United States)
133	31	"Rebirth! Super Z Valkyrie!" / Rebirth! Turbo Valtryek! Transliteration: "Shinsei! Chō-Z Varukirī!" (Japanese: 新生!超Zヴァルキリー!!)	October 29, 2018	May 19, 2019 (Canada); August 3, 2019 (United States)
134	32	"Demon Castle, Dead Gran!" / Dread Tower! The Dark Citadel! Transliteration: "Ma-jō Deddo Guran!" (Japanese: 魔城デッドグラン!!)	November 5, 2018	May 25, 2019 (Canada); August 10, 2019 (United States)
135	33	"Tremble! Dead Gran's Trap" / Trapped In The Dread Tower! Transliteration: "Senritsu!! Deddo Guran no wana" (Japanese: 戦慄!!デッドグランの罠)	November 12, 2018	May 26, 2019 (Canada); August 17, 2019 (United States)
136	34	"Fusion Bey! Eclipse!!" / Secret of The Fused Bey! Transliteration: "Gattai Bei! Ekuripusu!" (Japanese: 合体ベイ!エクリプス!!)	November 19, 2018	June 1, 2019 (Canada); August 24, 2019 (United States)
137	35	"Flame God! Cho-Z Spriggan!" / Spirit of Flame! Turbo Spryzen! Transliteration: "Enjin! Chōzetsu Supurigan!!" (Japanese: 炎神!超Zスプリガン!!)	November 26, 2018	June 2, 2019 (Canada); August 31, 2019 (United States)
138	36	"Aiga Battles the Darkness!" / The Darkness Within! Transliteration: "Aiga, to no tatakai!" (Japanese: アイガ、闇との戦い!!)	December 3, 2018	June 8, 2019 (Canada); September 7, 2019 (United States)
139	37	"Super Z Clash! Showdown in the Demon Castle!" / Turbo Clash! Showdown at the Dark Citadel! Transliteration: "Chōzetsu Gekitotsu! Majō no Kessen!" (Japanese: 超ゼツ激突!魔城の決戦!!)	December 10, 2018	June 9, 2019 (Canada); September 14, 2019 (United States)
140	38	"Explosive Birth! Super Z Achilles!" / Rebirth! Turbo Achilles! Transliteration: "Bakuretsu Tanjō! Cho-Z Akiresu!" (Japanese: 爆裂誕生!超Zアキレス!!!)	December 17, 2018	June 15, 2019 (Canada); September 21, 2019 (United States)
141	39	"The Rematch With Aiga's Spirit!!" / Aiger's Rematch! Unbreakable Bond! Transliteration: "Aiga Tamashī no Rebenji!" (Japanese: アイガ魂の再戦（リベンジ ）!!)	December 24, 2018	June 16, 2019 (Canada); September 28, 2019 (United States)
142	40	"Knight of the Wind, Air Knight!" / Master of the Wind! Air Knight! Transliteration: "Kaze no Kishi Ea Naito!" (Japanese: 風の騎士エアナイト!)	January 7, 2019	July 28, 2019 (Canada); October 5, 2019 (United States)
143	41	"Hearts vs. Phi!" / Hyde vs. Phi! Transliteration: "Hātsu VS Fai!" (Japanese: 魔王(ハーツ)VS神(ファイ)！！)	January 14, 2019	August 3, 2019 (Canada); October 12, 2019 (United States)
144	42	"Battle Royal! A Strategy for a Great Battle!" / Battle Royale! Beyblade Heroes! Transliteration: "Batoru Roiyaru! Senryaku Daisakusen!" (Japanese: バトルロイヤル!戦略大作戦!!)	January 21, 2019	August 4, 2019 (Canada); October 19, 2019 (United States)
145	43	"God of Destruction! Dead Phoenix!" / Lord of Destruction! Dread Phoenix! Transliteration: "Hakaishin! Deddo Fenikkusu!" (Japanese: 破壊神!デッドフェニックス!!)	January 28, 2019	August 10, 2019 (Canada); October 26, 2019 (United States)
146	44	"Super Z Special Training: Kingdom Edition!" / Turbo Training! Xavier's Kingdom! Transliteration: "Chōzetsu Tokkun, Otoku-hen!!" (Japanese: 超ゼツ特訓、王国編!!)	February 4, 2019	August 25, 2019 (Canada); November 2, 2019 (United States)
147	45	"Super Z Special Training: Savanna Chapter!!" / Turbo Training! Survival on The Savanna! Transliteration: "Chōzetsu Tokkun, Sabanna-hen!!" (Japanese: 超ゼツ特訓、サバンナ編!!)	February 11, 2019	August 31, 2019 (Canada); November 9, 2019 (United States)
148	46	"Fly! Aerial Showdown!!" / Take Flight! Aerial Showdown! Transliteration: "Tobe! Kūchū Daikessen!" (Japanese: 飛べ!空中大決戦!!)	February 18, 2019	September 1, 2019 (Canada); November 16, 2019 (United States)
149	47	"The God of Flames VS The God of Destruction!!" / Spirit of Flame vs. Lord of Destruction! Transliteration: "Enjin VS Hakkaishin!" (Japanese: 炎神VS破壊神!!)	February 25, 2019	September 2, 2019 (Canada); November 23, 2019 (United States)
150	48	"Our Beyblade!" / Blading Together! Turbo Awakening! Transliteration: "Oretachi no Beiburēdo!" (Japanese: 俺たちのベイブレード!)	March 4, 2019	September 3, 2019 (Canada); November 30, 2019 (United States)
151	49	"Aiga vs. Phi!!" / Aiger vs. Phi! Transliteration: "Aiga VS Fai!" (Japanese: アイガVSファイ!!)	March 11, 2019	August 18, 2019 (Canada); December 7, 2019 (United States)
152	50	"Aiga's Super Z Resonance!!" / Aiger's Turbo Resonance! Transliteration: "Aiga, Chōzetsu Kyōmei!" (Japanese: アイガ、超ゼツ共鳴!!)	March 18, 2019	August 18, 2019 (Canada); December 14, 2019 (United States)
153	51	"Bonds! Aiga vs. Valt!!" / Bonding! Aiger vs Valt! Transliteration: "Kizuna! Aiga VS Baruto!!" (Japanese: 絆!アイガVSバルト!!)	March 25, 2019	September 8, 2019 (Canada); December 21, 2019 (United States)

=== Beyblade Burst Rise (2019–2020) ===
No. overall	No. in season	Japanese Translated title/English title	Original release date	English air date
154	1	"Time to Get Serious! Ace Dragon!" / Ace Dragon! On the Rise! Transliteration: "Gachi da ze Ēsu Doragon!" (Japanese: ガチだぜエースドラゴン！)	April 5, 2019	January 17, 2020 (New Zealand); February 8, 2020 (United States); March 7, 2020 (Canada)
155	2	"Keep on Going! Bushin Ashura!" / Lookin' Awesome! Bushin Ashindra! Transliteration: "Iga Su Ze Bushin'Ashura!" (Japanese: イガすぜブシンアシュラ!)	April 12, 2019	January 17, 2020 (New Zealand); February 8, 2020 (United States); March 7, 2020 (Canada)
156	3	"Seer-iously!? Wizard Fafnir!" / Abracadabra! Wizard Fafnir! Transliteration: "Ma jika!? Wizādo Fabuniru!" (Japanese: 魔ジカ！？ウィザードファブニル！)	April 19, 2019	January 24, 2020 (New Zealand); February 8, 2020 (United States)
157	4	"The Fiery Grand Dragon!" / From the Flames! Glyph Dragon! Transliteration: "Honō no Guran Doragon!" (Japanese: 炎のグランドラゴン！)	April 26, 2019	January 24, 2020 (New Zealand); February 8, 2020 (United States)
158	5	"Dragon vs Fafnir!"; Transliteration: "Doragon vs Fafnir!" (Japanese: ドラゴンVSファブニル！)	May 3, 2019	January 31, 2020 (New Zealand); February 15, 2020 (United States)
159	6	"Explosive Speed! Grand Beat!" / Explosive Speed! Glyph Strike! Transliteration: "Bakusō Guran Bīto!" (Japanese: 爆速グランビート！)	May 10, 2019	January 31, 2020 (New Zealand); February 15, 2020 (United States)
160	7	"Valt, I Challenge You!" / Inspiration! Challenging Valt! Transliteration: "Baruto ni Chōsen da-!" (Japanese: バルトに挑戦だーッ！)	May 17, 2019	February 8, 2020 (New Zealand); February 22, 2020 (United States)
161	8	"The Exciting Bey Carnival!" / Get Hype! Bey Carnival! Transliteration: "Moerotsu Bei Kānibaru!" (Japanese: 燃えろッベイカーニバル！)	May 24, 2019	February 8, 2020 (New Zealand); February 22, 2020 (United States)
162	9	"All-In! Judgement Joker!" / Transliteration: "Ōruin Jajjimento Jōkā!" (Japanese: オールイン♠︎! ジャッジメントジョーカー!)	May 31, 2019	February 15, 2020 (New Zealand); February 29, 2020 (United States)
163	10	"It's a Gatinko Battle in The Best Four!" / Rising Battles! Semifinals! Transliteration: "Gachi Batoru da ze Besuto 4!" (Japanese: ガチバトルだぜベスト4！)	June 7, 2019	February 15, 2020 (New Zealand); February 29, 2020 (United States)
164	11	"Serious vs. Tricks!" / The Final Hand! Transliteration: "Gachi vs. Torikku!" (Japanese: ガチvsトリック!)	June 14, 2019	February 21, 2020 (New Zealand); March 7, 2020 (United States)
165	12	"Heavy Steel! Zwei Longinus!" / Heavy Steel! Zone Lúinor! Transliteration: "Jū Hagane Zwei Longinus!" (Japanese: 重鋼ツヴァイロンギヌス！)	June 21, 2019	February 21, 2020 (New Zealand); March 7, 2020 (United States)
166	13	"I've Got This! Go, Shoot!" / Bey Carnival! Epic Final! Transliteration: "Kimeru ze Gachi Shūto!" (Japanese: 決めるぜっガチシュート！)	June 28, 2019	February 28, 2020 (New Zealand); March 14, 2020 (United States)
167	14	"Serious Burst! Gold Turbo!" / Rise and Shine! Hyper-Flux! Transliteration: "Gachinko Sakuretsu Gōrudo Tābo!" (Japanese: ガチンコ炸裂ゴールドターボ！)	July 5, 2019	February 28, 2020 (New Zealand); March 14, 2020 (United States)
168	15	"Drum vs Delta!" / Dante vs Delta! Transliteration: "Doramu Vs. Deruta!" (Japanese: ドラムvsデルタ!)	July 12, 2019	March 7, 2020 (New Zealand); March 21, 2020 (United States)
169	16	"Bey of The Devil! Devolos!" / The Demon Bey! Devolos! Transliteration: "Akuma no Bey, Diaborosu!" (Japanese: 悪魔のベイ、ティアボロス!)	July 19, 2019	March 7, 2020 (New Zealand); March 21, 2020 (United States)
170	17	"Fly, Heaven Pegasus!" / Flying High! Harmony Pegasus! Transliteration: "Hishō, Hebun Pegasasu!" (Japanese: 飛翔、ヘブンペガサス！)	July 26, 2019	March 13, 2020 (New Zealand); March 28, 2020 (United States)
171	18	"The Most Sinister Art! Dread Bahamut!" / Dangerous Art! Dusk Balkesh! Transliteration: "Sai kyō Āto, Doreddo Bahamūto!" (Japanese: 最凶アート、ドレッドバハムート)	August 2, 2019	March 13, 2020 (New Zealand); March 28, 2020 (United States)
172	19	"Flash! Shining Cross!" / Flash of Light! Shining Crux! Transliteration: "Senkō, Shainingu Kurosu!" (Japanese: 閃光、シャイニングクロス！)	August 9, 2019	April 3, 2020 (Ukraine); April 4, 2020 (United States)
173	20	"Airhead vs God's Child!" / Dante vs Pheng! Transliteration: "Tennen VS Kami no Ko!" (Japanese: 天然VS神の子！)	August 16, 2019	April 4, 2020 (United States); April 4, 2020 (Ukraine)
174	21	"Battle in The Sky!" / Battle in the Skies! Transliteration: "Tenkū no tatakai!" (Japanese: 天空の戦い！)	August 23, 2019	April 5, 2020 (Ukraine); April 11, 2020 (United States)
175	22	"The Emerging Six! Battle Journey!" / Showdown at Battle Island! Transliteration: "Derokku! Batoru Jānī!" (Japanese: 出ろッ6！バトルジャーニー!)	August 30, 2019	April 6, 2020 (Ukraine); April 11, 2020 (United States)
176	23	"Spin! Battle! Win!" / Spin! Advance! Survive! Transliteration: "Mawase! Susume! Kachinokore!" (Japanese: 回せ！進め！勝ち残れ！)	September 6, 2019	April 6, 2020 (Ukraine); April 18, 2020 (United States)
177	24	"Clash in The GT 3!" / Stand-off! Pheng vs Delta! Transliteration: "Gekitotsu GT3!" (Japanese: 激突 GT3!)	September 13, 2019	April 7, 2020 (Ukraine); April 18, 2020 (United States)
178	25	"A Challenge to Aiga!" / The Final Stage! Facing Aiger! Transliteration: "Aiga ni chōsenda!" (Japanese: アイガに挑戦だーッ！)	September 20, 2019	April 7, 2020 (Ukraine); April 25, 2020 (United States)
179	26	"It's Serious! Drum vs Aiga!" / Rise Up! Dante vs Aiger! Transliteration: "Gachi! Dorumu VS Aiga!!" (Japanese: ガチ！ドラムVSアイガ!!)	September 27, 2019	April 8, 2020 (Ukraine); April 25, 2020 (United States)
180	27	"Shine! My Gold Turbo!" / Shining Bright! Hyper-Flux! Transliteration: "Kirameke, Ore no Gōrudo Tābo!" (Japanese: 煌け、オレのゴールドターボ！)	October 4, 2019	April 8, 2020 (Ukraine); May 2, 2020 (Australia); July 11, 2020 (United States)
181	28	"Super Z! Aiga vs Delta!" / Turbo Battle! Aiger vs Delta! Transliteration: "Chōzetsu! Aiga vs Delta!" (Japanese: 超ゼツ！アイガvsデルタ!)	October 11, 2019	April 9, 2020 (Ukraine); May 2, 2020 (Australia); July 11, 2020 (United States)
182	29	"Assault! King of Hell - Arthur!" / Invasion! The New King! Transliteration: "Shūrai! Heru no ō Āsā!" (Japanese: 襲来！HELLの王・アーサー!)	October 18, 2019	April 9, 2020 (Ukraine); May 3, 2020 (Australia); July 18, 2020 (United States)
183	30	"The Bey of Demise! Apocalypse!" / Bey of Annihilation! Apocalypse! Transliteration: "Shūen no Bei! Apokaripusu!" (Japanese: 終焉のペイ、アポカリプス！)	October 25, 2019	April 10, 2020 (Ukraine); May 3, 2020 (Australia); July 18, 2020 (United States)
184	31	"Serious Birth! Imperial Dragon!" / Rebirth! Command Dragon! Transliteration: "Gachitan! Inperiaru Doragon!" (Japanese: ガチ誕!インペリアルドラゴン!)	November 1, 2019	April 10, 2020 (Ukraine); May 9, 2020 (Australia); July 25, 2020 (United States)
185	32	"Battle at Hell Tower!" / Battle at the Infernal Tower! Transliteration: "Heru Tawā no tatakai!" (摩天楼(ヘルタワー)の戦い!)	November 8, 2019	April 11, 2020 (Ukraine); May 9, 2020 (Australia); July 25, 2020 (United States)
186	33	"Genesis Activates!!" / Genesis in Motion! Transliteration: "Jeneshisu hatsudō!!" (ジェネシス発動!!)	November 15, 2019	May 10, 2020 (Australia); August 1, 2020 (United States)
187	34	"Diabolos' Counterattack!!" / Devolos' Revenge! Transliteration: "Gyakushū no Diaborosu!!" (逆襲のディアボロス!!)	November 22, 2019	May 10, 2020 (Australia); August 1, 2020 (United States)
188	35	"Dragon vs Apocalypse!" / Dragon vs Apocalypse! Transliteration: "Doragon VS Apokaripusu!" (ドラゴンVSアポカリプス!)	November 29, 2019	May 16, 2020 (Australia); August 8, 2020 (United States)
189	36	"Can It Be Broken!? The Infinite Lock System!" / Put to The Test! Unburstable Bey! Transliteration: "Yabureru ka!? Mugen Rokku Shisutemu!" (破れるか！？無限ロックシステム!)	December 6, 2019	May 16, 2020 (Australia); August 8, 2020 (United States)
190	37	"Dragon vs Genesis!" / Transliteration: "Doragon VS Jeneshisu!" (最高(ドラゴン)VS完全(ジェネシス)！)	December 13, 2019	June 20, 2020 (New Zealand); August 15, 2020 (United States)
191	38	"Aurora! Superior Turbo!" / Aurora! Superior-Flux! Transliteration: "Kyokukō! Superioru Tābo!" (極光！スペリオルターボ!)	December 20, 2019	June 20, 2020 (New Zealand); August 15, 2020 (United States)
192	39	"Revive! Diabolos!" / Rebirth! Master Devolos! Transliteration: "Yomigaere Diaborosu!" (蘇れッディアボロス!)	December 27, 2019	June 27, 2020 (New Zealand); August 22, 2020 (United States)
193	40	"Shine! Master Smash!" / Burning Bright! Master Smash! Transliteration: "Kageyake, Masutā Sumasshu!" (輝けッマスタースマッシュ!)	January 3, 2020	June 27, 2020 (New Zealand); August 22, 2020 (United States)
194	41	"Creation of The World! Big Bang Genesis!" / Ultimate Creation! Eclipse Genesis! Transliteration: "Sōsei! Bigguban Jeneshisu!!" (創世! ビッグバンジェネシス!!)	January 10, 2020	July 4, 2020 (New Zealand); August 29, 2020 (United States)
195	42	"Super Speed! Super Spinning! Super Attack!" / Hyper Training! Exhibition Match! Transliteration: "Chōsoku! Chōten! Chōgeki!" (超速！超転！超撃!)	January 17, 2020	July 4, 2020 (New Zealand); August 29, 2020 (United States)
196	43	"Shine, Ashura!" / Shining Ashindra! Transliteration: "Hikare Ashura!" (光れッ武神(アシュラ)！)	January 24, 2020	July 11, 2020 (New Zealand); September 5, 2020 (United States)
197	44	"A Serious Showdown! wbba. VS HELL!" / Rising Battles! Victories vs Inferno! Transliteration: "Gachi Taiketsu! wbba. VS HELL!" (ガチ対決！wbba.VS HELL!)	January 31, 2020	July 11, 2020 (New Zealand); September 5, 2020 (United States)
198	45	"Dragon's Ultimate Awakening!" / Dragon's Ultimate Awakening! Transliteration: "Doragon Kyūkyoku Kakusei!" (アポカリプス！ビックバンクラッシュ)	February 7, 2020	August 22, 2020 (New Zealand); September 12, 2020 (United States)
199	46	"The Pitch Black Dread Gyro!" / Pitch Black! Dusk Gyro! Transliteration: "Shikkoku no Doreddo Jyairo!" (漆黒のドレットジャイロ！)	February 14, 2020	August 22, 2020 (New Zealand); September 12, 2020 (United States)
200	47	"A Seriously Intense Tag Battle!" / Rising Ferocity! Tag Battle! Transliteration: "Gachi geki! Taggu Batoru!" (ガチ激！タッグバトル!!)	February 21, 2020	August 29, 2020 (New Zealand); September 19, 2020 (United States); November 11, 2020 (Canada)
201	48	"The Strongest Equation" / The Flawless Equation! Transliteration: "Saikyō no hōteishiki" (最強の方程式!!)	February 28, 2020	August 29, 2020 (New Zealand); September 19, 2020 (United States)
202	49	"The Greatest Tag Battle!" / The Greatest Tag Battle Ever! Transliteration: "Saikkō no Taggu Batoru" (最ッ高のタッグバトル!!)	March 6, 2020	September 5, 2020 (New Zealand); September 26, 2020 (United States)
203	50	"We Are the Victories!"; Transliteration: "Kore ga Bikutorīzu da!" (これがビクトリーズだ！)	March 13, 2020	September 5, 2020 (New Zealand); September 26, 2020 (United States)
204	51	"A Serious Friendship! Master Dragon!" / Rising Friendship! Master Dragon! Transliteration: "Gachi Yūjō! Masutā Doragon!" (ガチ友情！マスタードラゴン!)	March 20, 2020	September 12, 2020 (New Zealand); October 3, 2020 (United States)
205	52	"It's Serious! Drum vs Gwyn!" / Rise Up! Dante vs Gwyn! Transliteration: "Gachinko! Doramu VS Guin!" (ガチンコ! ドラムVSグウィン!)	March 27, 2020	September 12, 2020 (New Zealand); October 3, 2020 (United States)

=== Beyblade Burst Surge (2020–21) ===
No. overall	No. in season	Japanese Translated title/English title	Directed by	Written by	Original release date	English air date
206	1	"Beyblade Revolution!!" / The Blading Revolution! (Part 1); Transliteration: "Beiburēdo Kakumei!!" (Japanese: ベイブレード革(かく)命(めい)！！)	Kentarō Yamaguchi; Ryōhei Horiuchi	Hideki Sonoda	October 5, 2020	February 20, 2021 (United States)
207	2	"Beys of the Sun! Hyperion and Helios!!" / The Blading Revolution! (Part 2); Transliteration: "Taiyō no Bei! Haiperion & Heriosu!!" (Japanese: 太(たい)陽(よう)のベイ！ ハイペリオン&ヘリオス！！)	Kentarō Yamaguchi; Ryōhei Horiuchi	Hideki Sonoda	October 5, 2020	February 20, 2021 (United States)
208	3	"Aiming for the Sparking Shoot!!" / Locked On! Lightning Launch! (Part 1); Transliteration: "Mezase Supākingu Shūto!!" (Japanese: めざせッ スパーキングシュート！！)	Yūki Morita	Daisuke Ishibashi	October 12, 2020	February 20, 2021 (United States)
209	4	"Knock Out Ragnaruk!!" / Locked On! Lightning Launch! (Part 2); Transliteration: "Ragunaruku o Buttobase!!" (Japanese: ラグナルクをぶっとばせ！！)	Hiroaki Kudō	Daisuke Ishibashi	October 19, 2020	February 20, 2021 (United States)
210	5	"Do It! King Strike!" / Persistence! Kolossal Strike! (Part 1); Transliteration: "Kimero Kingu Sutoraiku!" (Japanese: 決(き)めろッ キングストライク！)	Sotsu Terada	Yoshifumi Fukushima	October 26, 2020	February 27, 2021 (United States)
211	6	"Curse Satan's Challenge!" / Persistence! Kolossal Strike! (Part 2); Transliteration: "Chōsenda Kāsu Satan!" (Japanese: 挑(ちょう)戦(せん)だッ カースサタン！)	Sotsu Terada	Yoshifumi Fukushima	November 3, 2020	February 27, 2021 (United States)
212	7	"Hear the Voice in Your Bey!" / Listen to Your Bey's Voice! (Part 1); Transliteration: "Bei no Koe o Kikunda!" (Japanese: ベイの声(こえ)えを聞(き)くんだッ！)	Dai Fukuyama	Hideki Sonoda	November 10, 2020	March 6, 2021 (United States)
213	8	"Meet the Monster: Free De La Hoya!!" / Listen to Your Bey's Voice! (Part 2); Transliteration: "Furī de ra Hōya Tōjō!!" (Japanese: 怪物(フリー・デラホーヤ)登(とう)場(じょう)！！)	Takayuki Yamamoto	Hideki Sonoda	November 17, 2020	March 6, 2021 (United States)
214	9	"Phantom Dragon! Mirage Fafnir!!" / Illusory Dragon! Mirage Fafnir! (Part 1); Transliteration: "Genryū! Mirāji Fabuniru!!" (Japanese: 幻(げん)竜(りゅう)！ ミラージュファブニル！！)	Yūki Morita	Hideki Sonoda	November 24, 2020	March 13, 2021 (United States)
215	10	"Attack Not Good!? Attack Not Good!!" / Illusory Dragon! Mirage Fafnir! (Part 2); Transliteration: "Kōgeki Enujī!? Kōgeki Enujī!!" (Japanese: 攻(こう)撃(げき)NG！？攻(こう)撃(げき)NG！！)	Shigeki Awai	Yoshifumi Fukushima	December 1, 2020	March 13, 2021 (United States)
216	11	"Dream Tag Battle!!" / Dream Team! Tag Battle! (Part 1); Transliteration: "Yume no Taggu Batoru!!" (Japanese: 夢(ゆめ)のタッグバトル！！)	Sotsu Terada	Yoshifumi Fukushima	December 7, 2020	March 20, 2021 (United States)
217	12	"Shirasagijo x Onigashima!" / Dream Team! Tag Battle! (Part 2); Transliteration: "Shirasagijō x Onigashima!" (Japanese: 白(しら)鷺(さぎ)城(じょう)×鬼(おに)ヶ(が)島(しま)！)	Sotsu Terada	Daisuke Ishibashi	December 14, 2020	March 20, 2021 (United States)
218	13	"Conquer the Demon Dungeon!!" / Conquering the Ogre's Dungeon! (Part 1); Transliteration: "Koryakuseyo Oni Danjon!!" (Japanese: 攻(こう)略(りゃく)せよッ 鬼(おに)ダンジョン！！)	Dai Fukuyama	Daisuke Ishibashi	December 21, 2020	March 27, 2021 (United States)
219	14	"Fierce Storm! Rage Longinus!!" / Conquering the Ogre's Dungeon! (Part 2); Transliteration: "Gekiran! Reiji Ronginusu!!" (Japanese: 激(げき)嵐(らん)！ レイジロンギヌス！！)	Takayuki Yamamoto	Hideki Sonoda	December 28, 2020	March 27, 2021 (United States)
220	15	"The Jet Black Sun! Variant Lucifer!!" / The Jet-Black Sun! Vex Lucius! (Part 1); Transliteration: "Shikkoku no Taiyō! Barianto Rushifā!!" (Japanese: 漆(しっ)黒(こく)の太(たい)陽(よう)！ バリアントルシファー！！)	Daisuke Chiba	Hideki Sonoda	January 5, 2021	April 3, 2021 (United States)
221	16	"Barrier! Variant Wall!!" / The Jet-Black Sun! Vex Lucius! (Part 2); Transliteration: "Kekkai! Barianto Uōru!!" (Japanese: 結(けっ)界(かい)！ バリアントウォール！！)	Hiroaki Kudō	Hideki Sonoda	January 12, 2021	April 3, 2021 (United States)
222	17	"Heaven!? Hell!!" / Is This a Dream?! Or Is It a Nightmare?! (Part 1); Transliteration: "Tengoku!? Jigoku!!" (Japanese: 天(てん)国(ごく)！？地(じ)獄(ごく)！！)	Sotsu Terada	Yoshifumi Fukushima	January 19, 2021	April 10, 2021 (United States)
223	18	"GT is Here!!" / Is This a Dream?! Or Is It a Nightmare?! (Part 2); Transliteration: "Gachi ga Kita!!" (Japanese: ガチが来(き)たッ！！)	Sotsu Terada	Yoshifumi Fukushima	January 26, 2021	April 10, 2021 (United States)
224	19	"The Stormy Dragon! Tempest Dragon!!" / Rise to Victory! Triumph Dragon! (Part 1); Transliteration: "Ranryū! Tenpesuto Doragon!!" (Japanese: 嵐(らん)竜(りゅう)！ テンペストドラゴン！！)	Takayuki Yamamoto	Daisuke Ishibashi	February 2, 2021	April 17, 2021 (United States)
225	20	"Flare of Tyranny: Lean!!" / Rise to Victory! Triumph Dragon! (Part 2); Transliteration: "Bōgyaku no Furea Rēn!!" (Japanese: 暴(ぼう)虐(ぎゃく)の炎(フレア) レーン！！)	Takayuki Yamamoto	Daisuke Ishibashi	February 9, 2021	April 17, 2021 (United States)
226	21	"The Great Revolution!! Legend Festival!!" / The Great Revolution! Legend Festival! (Part 1); Transliteration: "Kakumei Gekishin!! Rejendo Fesutibaru!!" (Japanese: 革(かく)命(めい)激(げき)震(しん)！！ レジェンドフェスティバル！！)	Shigeki Awai	Hideki Sonoda	February 16, 2021	April 24, 2021 (United States)
227	22	"Super Z! Infinite Achilles!!" / The Great Revolution! Legend Festival! (Part 2); Transliteration: "Chō Zetsu! Infinitto Akiresu!!" (Japanese: 超(ちょう)ゼツ！ インフィニットアキレス！！)	Park Chi Man; Sung Won Yong	Hideki Sonoda	February 23, 2021	April 24, 2021 (United States)
228	23	"Hyuga & Lean vs. Hikaru & Aiga!!" / Hyuga and Lain vs. Hikaru and Aiger! (Part 1); Transliteration: "Hyūga & Rēn Bāsasu Hikaru & Aiga!!" (Japanese: ヒュウガ&レーン VS(バーサス) ヒカル&アイガ！！)	Sotsu Terada	Yoshifumi Fukushima	March 2, 2021	May 1, 2021 (United States)
229	24	"A God Battle of Friendship!" / Hyuga and Lain vs. Hikaru and Aiger! (Part 2); Transliteration: "Yūjō no Goddo Batoru!" (Japanese: 友(ゆう)情(じょう)の神(ゴッド)バトル！)	Sotsu Terada	Yoshifumi Fukushima	March 6, 2021	May 1, 2021 (United States)
230	25	"A Tag Battle Among Men!" / A True Hero! Tag Battle Style! (Part 1); Transliteration: "Otoko no Taggu Batoru!" (Japanese: 漢(おとこ)のタッグバトル！)	Hanako Ueda	Daisuke Ishibashi	March 13, 2021	April 26, 2021 (Australia); July 10, 2021 (United States)
231	26	"GT vs. Super Z!!" / A True Hero! Tag Battle Style! (Part 2); Transliteration: "Gachi tai Chō Zetsu!!" (Japanese: ガチVS超(ちょう)ゼツ！！)	Haru Shinomiya	Daisuke Ishibashi	March 20, 2021	April 26, 2021 (Australia); July 10, 2021 (United States)
232	27	"Win and Go Forth, Zoom Zoom Zoom!" / Gotta Win! Going All-Out! (Part 1); Transliteration: "Kachinuke Gyugyugyūn!" (Japanese: 勝ち抜けッ ギュギュギューン！)	Naoki Hishikawa	Hideki Sonoda	March 27, 2021	April 27, 2021 (Australia); July 17, 2021 (United States)
233	28	"Strongest and Unbeatable vs. the New Generation!!" / Gotta Win! Going All-Out! (Part 2); Transliteration: "Saikyō Muteki Bāsasu Shin Sedai!!" (Japanese: 最(さい)強(きょう)無(む)敵(てき) VS(バーサス) 新(しん)世(せ)代(だい)！！)	Naoki Hishikawa	Yoshifumi Fukushima	April 4, 2021	April 27, 2021 (Australia); July 17, 2021 (United States)
234	29	"Defeat Valt!!" / Defeat Valt! (Part 1); Transliteration: "Baruto o Taose!!" (Japanese: バルトを倒(たお)せ！！)	Sotsu Terada	Yoshifumi Fukushima	April 11, 2021	May 3, 2021 (Australia); July 24, 2021 (United States)
235	30	"Explosive Battle!!" / Defeat Valt! (Part 2); Transliteration: "Bakuen no Batoru!!" (Japanese: 爆(ばく)炎(えん)の死闘(バトル)！！)	Sotsu Terada	Hideki Sonoda	April 18, 2021	May 3, 2021 (Australia); July 24, 2021 (United States)
236	31	"Finals! Valt vs. Lean!!" / Grand Finale! Valt vs. Lain! (Part 1); Transliteration: "Kesshō! Baruto Bāsasu Rēn!!" (Japanese: 決(けっ)勝(しょう)！ バルトVSレーン！！)	Dai Fukuyama	Daisuke Ishibashi	April 25, 2021	May 4, 2021 (Australia); July 31, 2021 (United States)
237	32	"Limit Break! Hyperion & Helios!!" / Grand Finale! Valt vs. Lain! (Part 2); Transliteration: "Rimitto Bureiku! Haiperion & Heriosu!!" (Japanese: 限界突破(リミットブレイク)！ ハイペリオン&ヘリオス！！)	Takayuki Yamamoto	Hideki Sonoda	May 2, 2021	May 4, 2021 (Australia); July 31, 2021 (United States)
238	33	"The Fierce Crimson God! World Spriggan!!" / Spirit of Fire! World Spryzen! (Part 1); Transliteration: "Guren no Kishin! Wārudo Supurigan!!" (Japanese: 紅(ぐ)蓮(れん)の鬼(き)神(しん)！ ワールドスプリガン！！)	Yūki Morita	Hideki Sonoda	May 8, 2021	May 10, 2021 (Australia); August 7, 2021 (United States)
239	34	"Tag Showdown! Valt & Shu!!" / Spirit of Fire! World Spryzen (Part 2); Transliteration: "Taggu Taiketsu! Baruto & Shū!!" (Japanese: タッグ対(たい)決(けつ)！ バルト&シュウ！！)	Naoki Hishikawa	Yoshifumi Fukushima	May 15, 2021	May 10, 2021 (Australia); August 7, 2021 (United States)
240	35	"Lucifer the End's Counterattack!!" / Counterattack! Lucius Endbringer! (Part 1); Transliteration: "Gyakushū no Rushifā Jiendo!!" (Japanese: 逆(ぎゃく)襲(しゅう)のルシファージエンド！！)	Sotsu Terada	Daisuke Ishibashi	May 22, 2021	May 11, 2021 (Australia); August 14, 2021 (United States)
241	36	"Cyber! Beyblade Virtual!!" / Counterattack! Lucius Endbringer! (Part 2); Transliteration: "Den'nō! Beiburēdo Bācharu!!" (Japanese: 電(でん)脳(のう)！ ベイブレードバーチャル！！)	Sotsu Terada	Daisuke Ishibashi	May 29, 2021	May 11, 2021 (Australia); August 14, 2021 (United States)
242	37	"The Best Tag Partner!!" / Tag-Team! Ultimate Partner! (Part 1); Transliteration: "Saikō no Taggu Pātonā!!" (Japanese: 最(さい)高(こう)のタッグパートナー！！)	Dai Fukuyama	Hideki Sonoda	June 6, 2021	May 17, 2021 (Australia); August 21, 2021 (United States)
243	38	"It Begins! Legend Super Tag League!!" / Tag-Team! Ultimate Partner! (Part 2); Transliteration: "Kaimaku! Rejendo Sūpā Taggu Rīgu!!" (Japanese: 開(かい)幕(まく)！ レジェンドスーパータッグリーグ！！)	Shigeki Awai	Daisuke Ishibashi	June 13, 2021	May 17, 2021 (Australia); August 21, 2021 (United States)
244	39	"Strategy! Ultimate Storm!!" / Raging Battle! Defeating the Storm! (Part 1); Transliteration: "Kōryaku! Arutimetto Sutōmu!!" (Japanese: 攻(こう)略(りゃく)！ アルティメットストーム！！)	Daisuke Chiba	Yoshifumi Fukushima	June 20, 2021	May 18, 2021 (Australia); August 28, 2021 (United States)
245	40	"Crash! Everyone's Bonds!!" / Raging Battle! Defeating the Storm! (Part 2); Transliteration: "Shōtotsu! Sorezore no Kizuna!!" (Japanese: 衝(しょう)突(とつ)！ それぞれの絆(きずな)！！)	Naoki Hishikawa	Yoshifumi Fukushima	June 27, 2021	May 18, 2021 (Australia); August 28, 2021 (United States)
246	41	"The Climactic Legend Battle!" / Crash and Clash! Battle of Legends! (Part 1); Transliteration: "Hakunetsu no Rejendo Batoru!" (Japanese: 白(はく)熱(ねつ)のレジェンドバトル！)	Sotsu Terada	Hideki Sonoda	July 3, 2021	August 2, 2021 (Australia); September 4, 2021 (United States)
247	42	"Burn Flare! Spark!!" / Crash and Clash! Battle of Legends! (Part 2); Transliteration: "Moyase Furea! Pitā!!" (Japanese: 燃(も)やせ炎(フレア)！ ピターーッ！！)	Sotsu Terada	Hideki Sonoda	July 10, 2021	August 2, 2021 (Australia); September 4, 2021 (United States)
248	43	"Friendly Fire!? Limit Break the End!!" / Friendly Fire? Final Limit Breaker! (Part 1); Transliteration: "Dōshi Uchi!? Rimitto Bureiku Jiendo!!" (Japanese: 同(どう)士(し)討(う)ち(ち)！？ リミットブレイクジエンド！！)	Dai Fukuyama	Hideki Sonoda	July 17, 2021	August 3, 2021 (Australia); September 11, 2021 (United States)
249	44	"Next-Level Training! Jet Wyvern!!" / Friendly Fire? Final Limit Breaker! (Part 2); Transliteration: "Genkai Tokkun! Jetto Waibān!!" (Japanese: 限(げん)界(かい)特(とっ)訓(くん)！ ジェットワイバーン！！)	Akira Mano	Yoshifumi Fukushima	July 24, 2021	August 3, 2021 (Australia); September 11, 2021 (United States)
250	45	"Burning! Manly! Serious Battle!" / Scorching Battle! Dauntless Bravery! (Part 1); Transliteration: "Shakunetsu! Otokogi! Gachi Batoru!" (Japanese: 灼(しゃく)熱(ねつ)！漢(おと)気(こぎ)！ガチバトル！)	Yūki Morita	Daisuke Ishibashi	July 31, 2021	August 9, 2021 (Australia); September 18, 2021 (United States)
251	46	"Mad Storm! Raging Tempest!!" / Scorching Battle! Dauntless Bravery! (Part 2); Transliteration: "Kyōran! Reijingu Tenpesuto!!" (Japanese: 狂(きょう)嵐(らん)！ レイジングテンペスト！！)	Daisuke Chiba	Daisuke Ishibashi	August 7, 2021	August 9, 2021 (Australia); September 18, 2021 (United States)
252	47	"No Spark!!" / We Can Do It! Or Maybe Not! (Part 1); Transliteration: "Pitā ga Dekinai!!" (Japanese: ピターーッができない！！)	Naoki Hishikawa	Yoshifumi Fukushima	August 14, 2021	August 10, 2021 (Australia); September 25, 2021 (United States)
253	48	"The Bonds of Beys!!" / We Can Do It! Or Maybe Not! (Part 2); Transliteration: "Bei no Kizuna!!" (Japanese: ベイの絆(きずな)！！)	Haru Shinomiya	Hideki Sonoda	August 21, 2021	August 10, 2021 (Australia); September 25, 2021 (United States)
254	49	"Confident! Timid? Carefree!?" / Confidence! Cowardice? Carefree-ness?! (Part 1); Transliteration: "Tsuyoki! Yowaki? Nōtenki!?" (Japanese: 強(つよ)気(き)！弱(よわ)気(き)？ノー天(てん)気(き)！？)	Sotsu Terada	Daisuke Ishibashi	August 28, 2021	August 16, 2021 (Australia); October 2, 2021 (United States)
255	50	"Cross Over! The Legendary Wall!!" / Confidence! Cowardice? Carefree-ness?! (Part 2); Transliteration: "Koero! Rejendo no Kabe!!" (Japanese: 超(こ)えろ！ レジェンドの壁(かべ)！！)	Sotsu Terada	Daisuke Ishibashi	September 7, 2021	August 16, 2021 (Australia); October 2, 2021 (United States)
256	51	"Revolution! Final Battle!!" / Revolution! The Final Showdown! (Part 1); Transliteration: "Kakumei da! Saishū Kessen!!" (Japanese: 革(かく)命(めい)だ！最(さい)終(しゅう)決(けっ)戦(せん)！！)	Naoki Hishikawa	Hideki Sonoda	September 17, 2021	August 17, 2021 (Australia); October 9, 2021 (United States)
257	52	"Break Through the Limits! Our Flare!!" / Revolution! The Final Showdown! (Part 2); Transliteration: "Genkai Toppa! Oretachi no Furea!!" (Japanese: 限(げん)界(かい)突(とっ)破(ぱ)！俺(おれ)たちの太陽(フレア)！！)	Hanako Ueda	Hideki Sonoda	September 21, 2021	August 17, 2021 (Australia); October 9, 2021 (United States)

=== Beyblade Burst QuadDrive (2021–22) ===
No. overall	No. in season	Japanese translated title / English dub title	Directed by	Written by	Original release date	English air date
258	1	"Demon King! Dynamite Belial!!" / The Dark Prince! And Destruction Belfyre! (Part 1); Transliteration: "Maō! Dainamaito Beriaru!!" (Japanese: 魔王！ ダイナマイトベリアル！！)	Dai Fukuyama; Takayuki Yamamoto	Toshimichi Ōkawa	April 2, 2021	December 4, 2021 (United States)
259	2	"Belial vs. Longinus" / The Dark Prince! And Destruction Belfyre! (Part 2); Transliteration: "Beriaru Bāsasu Ronginusu" (Japanese: 魔王(ベリアル)VS絶対王者(ロンギヌス))	Dai Fukuyama; Takayuki Yamamoto	Toshimichi Ōkawa	April 2, 2021	December 4, 2021 (United States)
260	3	"Graveyard of Beys! The Gates of Hell!!" / Graveyard of Beys! Phantom's Gate! (Part 1); Transliteration: "Bei no Hakaba! Makai no Mon!!" (Japanese: ベイの墓場！ 魔界の門！！)	Mizuki Sasaki	Hideki Sonoda	April 9, 2021	December 5, 2021 (United States)
261	4	"Sturm und Drang! Cyclone Ragnaruk!!" / Graveyard of Beys! Phantom's Gate! (Part 2); Transliteration: "Shippū Dotō! Saikuron Ragunaruku!!" (Japanese: 疾風怒涛！ サイクロンラグナルク！！)	Ryō Miyata	Hideki Sonoda	April 16, 2021	December 5, 2021 (United States)
262	5	"Mode Change! High & Low!!" / Changing Modes! Highs and Lows! (Part 1); Transliteration: "Mōdo Chenji! Hai Ando Rō!!" (Japanese: モードチェンジ！ ハイ&ロー！！)	Yūsuke Onoda	Toshimichi Ōkawa	April 23, 2021	December 11, 2021 (United States)
263	6	"Rival and Amigo!!" / Changing Modes! Highs and Lows! (Part 2); Transliteration: "Raibaru to Amīgo!!" (Japanese: ライバルとアミーゴ！！)	Yūma Suzuki	Toshimichi Ōkawa	April 30, 2021	December 11, 2021 (United States)
264	7	"Demon World Theatre! Bell vs. Valt!!" / Theater of the Abyss! Bel vs. Valt! (Part 1); Transliteration: "Makai Gekijō! Beru Bāsasu Baruto!!" (Japanese: 魔界劇場！ ベルVSバルト！！)	Dai Fukuyama	Hideki Sonoda	May 7, 2021	December 18, 2021 (United States)
265	8	"Counterattack! Dynamite Bomber!! / Counterattack! Destruction Wrecker!" / Theater of the Abyss! Bel vs. Valt! (Part 2); Transliteration: "Gyakushū! Dainamaito Bonbā!!" (Japanese: 逆襲！ ダイナマイトボンバー！！)	Takayuki Yamamoto	Hideki Sonoda	May 14, 2021	December 18, 2021 (United States)
266	9	"The Demon King Flies Onto the World Stage!!" / To the Skies! World Domination! (Part 1); Transliteration: "Maō Sekai ni Tobu!!" (Japanese: 魔王ッ世界に翔ぶ！！)	Yoshiyuki Kumeda	Hideki Sonoda	May 21, 2021	February 5, 2022 (United States)
267	10	"The Solitary Vanish Fafnir!!" / To the Skies! World Domination! (Part 2); Transliteration: "Kokō no Banisshu Fabuniru!!" (Japanese: 孤高のバニッシュファブニル！！)	Shin'ichi Fukumoto	Toshimichi Ōkawa	May 28, 2021	February 5, 2022 (United States)
268	11	"The Other Valkyrie!!" / The Other Valtryek! (Part 1); Transliteration: "Mō Hitotsu no Varukirī!!" (Japanese: もうひとつのヴァルキリー！！)	Ryō Miyata	Toshimichi Ōkawa	June 4, 2021	February 12, 2022 (United States)
269	12	"Belial's Upgrade!!" / The Other Valtryek! (Part 2); Transliteration: "Bājon Appu Beriaru!!" (Japanese: 改造強化(バージョンアップ)ベリアル！！)	Shigeru Yamazaki	Hideki Sonoda	June 11, 2021	February 12, 2022 (United States)
270	13	"Reversal Strategy! Belial vs. Fafnir!!" / Flipping the Script! Belfyre vs. Fafnir! (Part 1); Transliteration: "Gyakuten Sakusen! Beriaru Bāsasu Fabuniru!!" (Japanese: 逆転作戦！ ベリアルVSファブニル！！)	Mizuki Sasaki	Hideki Sonoda	June 18, 2021	February 19, 2022 (United States)
271	14	"Explosive Sword! Savior Valkyrie!!" / Flipping the Script! Belfyre vs. Fafnir! (Part 2); Transliteration: "Baku Ken! Seibā Varukirī!!" (Japanese: 爆剣！ セイバーヴァルキリー！！)	Yūsuke Onoda	Toshimichi Ōkawa	June 25, 2021	February 19, 2022 (United States)
272	15	"Roar of the Evil Dragon, Roar Bahamut!" / Dragon's Howl! Roar Balkesh! (Part 1); Transliteration: "Jaryū no Hōkō, Roa Bahamūto!" (Japanese: 邪竜の咆哮、ロアバハムート！)	Dai Fukuyama	Toshimichi Ōkawa	July 2, 2021	February 26, 2022 (United States)
273	16	"Crashing Awakening! Valkyrie vs. Valkyrie!!" / Dragon's Howl! Roar Balkesh! (Part 2); Transliteration: "Gekitotsu Kakusei! Varukirī Bāsasu Varukirī!!" (Japanese: 激突覚醒！ ヴァルキリーVSヴァルキリー！！)	Keisuke Warita	Hideki Sonoda	July 9, 2021	February 26, 2022 (United States)
274	17	"Flying Dynamite Battle Tour!" / Lift Off! The Great Aerial Tour! (Part 1); Transliteration: "Soratobu Dainamaito Batoru Tsuā!" (Japanese: 空飛ぶ爆裂(ダイナマイト)バトルツアー！)	Takayuki Yamamoto	Hideki Sonoda	July 16, 2021	March 5, 2022 (United States)
275	18	"Earthquake at the Sacred Grounds! Battle of Beigoma Academy!!" / Lift Off! The Great Aerial Tour! (Part 2); Transliteration: "Seichi Gekishin! Beigoma Gakuen no Tatakai!!" (Japanese: 聖地激震！ 米駒学園の闘い！！)	Yoshiyuki Kumeda; Jingu O	Toshimichi Ōkawa	July 23, 2021	March 5, 2022 (United States)
276	19	"Nova Clash! Bell vs. Rashad!!" / Novas Collide! Bel vs. Rashad! (Part 1); Transliteration: "Shinsei Gekitotsu! Beru Bāsasu Rashado!!" (Japanese: 新星激突！ ベルVSラシャド！！)	Ryō Miyata	Toshimichi Ōkawa	July 30, 2021	March 12, 2022 (United States)
277	20	"The Crimson Astral Spriggan!!" / Novas Collide! Bel vs. Rashad! (Part 2); Transliteration: "Kurenai no Asutoraru Supurigan!!" (Japanese: 紅の超星(アストラルスプリガン)！！)	Yūsuke Onoda	Hideki Sonoda	August 6, 2021	March 12, 2022 (United States)
278	21	"The Demon King Attacks! Bell vs. Free!" / The Dark Prince Strikes! Bel vs. Free! (Part 1); Transliteration: "Maō Shūgeki! Beru Bāsasu Furī!!" (Japanese: 魔王襲撃！ ベルVSフリー！！)	Mizuki Sasaki	Hideki Sonoda	August 13, 2021	March 19, 2022 (United States)
279	22	"Onigashima, Battle Royal!!" / The Dark Prince Strikes! Bel vs. Free! (Part 2); Transliteration: "Onigashima, Batoru Roiyaru!!" (Japanese: 鬼ヶ島、バトルロイヤル！！)	Shigeru Yamazaki	Toshimichi Ōkawa	August 20, 2021	March 19, 2022 (United States)
280	23	"The Demon King, Becomes a Servant!!" / Dark Prince One Day! Minion the Next! (Part 1); Transliteration: "Maō, Meshitsukai ni Naru!!" (Japanese: 魔王、召使いになる！！)	Takayuki Yamamoto	Toshimichi Ōkawa	August 27, 2021	March 26, 2022 (United States)
281	24	"Crimson Dance! Magma Ifrit!!" / Dark Prince One Day! Minion the Next! (Part 2); Transliteration: "Shinku no Mai! Maguma Ifurīto!!" (Japanese: 真紅の舞！マグマイフリート！！)	Keisuke Warita	Hideki Sonoda	September 3, 2021	March 26, 2022 (United States)
282	25	"Tyranny of the Eight-headed Dragon! Guilty Longinus!!" / Knight of Dragons! Guilty Luinor! (Part 1); Transliteration: "Yaryū no Bōkun! Giruti Ronginusu!!" (Japanese: 八(や)竜(りゅう)の暴君！ギルティロンギヌス！！)	Dai Fukuyama	Hideki Sonoda	September 10, 2021	April 2, 2022 (United States)
283	26	"The Battle at Onigashima's Summit!!" / Knight of Dragons! Guilty Luinor! (Part 2); Transliteration: "Onigashima Chōjō Batoru!!" (Japanese: 鬼ヶ島頂上決闘(バトル)！！)	Takeshi Shiga	Toshimichi Ōkawa	September 17, 2021	April 2, 2022 (United States)
284	27	"The Floating Demon King's Great Advance!" / MVP! Great Aerial Tour's Landing! (Part 1); Transliteration: "Ukare Maō no Dai Shingeki!" (Japanese: 浮かれ魔王の大進撃！)	Shigeki Awai	Toshimichi Ōkawa	September 24, 2021	April 9, 2022 (United States)
285	28	"The Decisive Aerial Battle! Dynamite battle!!" / MVP! Great Aerial Tour's Landing! (Part 2); Transliteration: "Kūchū Kessen! Dainamaito Batoru!!" (Japanese: 空中決戦！ダイナマイトバトル！！)	Yoshiyuki Kumeda	Hideki Sonoda	October 1, 2021	April 9, 2022 (United States)
286	29	"The Demon King's Resurrection! Dangerous Belial!!" / The Dark Prince Returns! Devastate Belfyre! (Part 1); Transliteration: "Maō Fukkatsu! Denjarasu Beriaru!!" (Japanese: 魔王復活！デンジャラスベリアル！！)	Ryō Miyata	Hideki Sonoda	October 8, 2021	May 22, 2022 (Australia); June 11, 2022 (United States)
287	30	"Advent of the High King of Light!!" / The Dark Prince Returns! Devastate Belfyre! (Part 2); Transliteration: "Hikari no Haō Kōrin!!" (Japanese: 光の覇王降臨！！)	Shigeki Awai; Jingu O	Toshimichi Ōkawa	October 15, 2021	May 22, 2022 (Australia); June 11, 2022 (United States)
288	31	"Halo! Greatest Raphael!!" / Ring of Light! Glory Regnar! (Part 1); Transliteration: "Kōrin! Gureitesuto Rafaeru!!" (Japanese: 光輪！グレイテストラファエル！！)	Yūsuke Onoda	Toshimichi Ōkawa	October 22, 2021	May 28, 2022 (Australia); June 18, 2022 (United States)
289	32	"Demon King vs. High King! The Strongest Team Playoff!!" / Ring of Light! Glory Regnar! (Part 2); Transliteration: "Maō Bāsasu Haō! Saikyō Chīmu Ketteisen!!" (Japanese: 魔王VS覇王！最強チーム決定戦！！)	Takayuki Yamamoto	Hideki Sonoda	October 29, 2021	May 28, 2022 (Australia); June 18, 2022 (United States)
290	33	"Reversal! Reversal!! Great Counterattack!!!" / Reversal! Reversal! Great Counterattack! (Part 1); Transliteration: "Gyakuten! Gyakuten! Dai Gyakushū!!!" (Japanese: 逆転！逆転！！大逆襲！！！)	Dai Fukuyama	Hideki Sonoda	November 5, 2021	May 29, 2022 (Australia); June 25, 2022 (United States)
291	34	"3rd Round! Battle Royal!!" / Reversal! Reversal! Great Counterattack! (Part 2); Transliteration: "Sādo Raundo! Batoru Roiyaru!!" (Japanese: 3rd ROUND(ラウンド)！総力戦(バトルロイヤル)！！)	Shigeru Yamazaki	Toshimichi Ōkawa	November 12, 2021	May 29, 2022 (Australia); June 25, 2022 (United States)
292	35	"The Demon King, Leaves the Team?!" / Disbanded! The Dark Prince Goes Rogue?! (Part 1); Transliteration: "Maō, Chīmu Dattai!?" (Japanese: 魔王、チーム脱退！？)	Mizuki Sasaki	Toshimichi Ōkawa	November 19, 2021	June 4, 2022 (Australia); July 2, 2022 (United States)
293	36	"Heated! Mutiny Battle!!" / Disbanded! The Dark Prince Goes Rogue?! (Part 2); Transliteration: "Moeru ze! Gekokujō Batoru!!" (Japanese: 燃えるぜッ！下剋上バトル！！)	Yoshiyuki Kumeda	Hideki Sonoda	November 26, 2021	June 4, 2022 (Australia); July 2, 2022 (United States)
294	37	"Rage! Greatest Pendulum!!" / Regnar's Wrath! Glory Pendulum! (Part 1); Transliteration: "Gekido! Gureitesuto Pendyuramu!!" (Japanese: 激怒！振り子地獄(グレイテストペンデュラム)！！)	Ryō Miyata	Hideki Sonoda	December 3, 2021	July 9, 2022 (United States); August 13, 2022 (Australia)
295	38	"The Ultimate Bond! Ultimate Valkyrie!!" / Regnar's Wrath! Glory Pendulum! (Part 2); Transliteration: "Kyūkyoku no Kizuna! Arutimetto Varukirī!!" (Japanese: 究極の絆！アルティメットヴァルキリー！！)	Shigeki Awai	Toshimichi Ōkawa	December 10, 2021	July 9, 2022 (United States); August 13, 2022 (Australia)
296	39	"Reckless Panic! Full Custom Bey Launcher!!" / Reckless Panic! Bag of Tricks! (Part 1); Transliteration: "Bōsō Panikku! Furu Kasutamu Bei Ranchā!!" (Japanese: 暴走パニック！フルカスタムベイランチャー！！)	Haru Shinomiya	Toshimichi Ōkawa	December 17, 2021	July 16, 2022 (United States); August 14, 2022 (Australia)
297	40	"High & Low! Hybrid Stadium!!" / Reckless Panic! Bag of Tricks! (Part 2); Transliteration: "Hai Ando Rō! Haiburiddo Sutajiamu!!" (Japanese: ハイ&ロー！ハイブリッドスタジアム！！)	Takayuki Yamamoto	Hideki Sonoda	December 24, 2021	July 16, 2022 (United States); August 14, 2022 (Australia)
298	41	"Phoenix! Prominence Phoenix!!" / Rekindled Flames! Prominence Phoenix! (Part 1); Transliteration: "Fushichō! Purominensu Fenikkusu!!" (Japanese: 不死鳥！プロミネンスフェニックス！！)	Mizuki Sasaki	Hideki Sonoda	December 31, 2021	July 23, 2022 (United States); August 20, 2022 (Australia)
299	42	"Dangerous! It's an Explosive Breakthrough!!" / Rekindled Flames! Prominence Phoenix! (Part 2); Transliteration: "Denjarasu! Bakuretsu Toppa na no da!!" (Japanese: デンジャラス！爆裂突破なのだ！！)	Keisuke Warita	Hideki Sonoda	January 7, 2022	July 23, 2022 (United States); August 20, 2022 (Australia)
300	43	"Wild Crimson Dance! Prominence Shaker!!" / Scarlet Flurry! Prominence Shaker! (Part 1); Transliteration: "Guren Ranbu! Purominensu Sheikā!!" (Japanese: 紅蓮乱舞！プロミネンスシェイカー！！)	Shigeki Awai	Toshimichi Ōkawa	January 14, 2022	July 30, 2022 (United States); August 21, 2022 (Australia)
301	44	"The Shield Trap of Hatred!!" / Scarlet Flurry! Prominence Shaker! (Part 2); Transliteration: "Nikushimi no Shīrudo Torappu!!" (Japanese: 憎しみのシールドトラップ！！)	Yūsuke Onoda	Hideki Sonoda	January 21, 2022	July 30, 2022 (United States); August 21, 2022 (Australia)
302	45	"Perfect Gear! Chase the Phoenix!!" / Aurora Bound! Chasing the Phoenix! (Part 1); Transliteration: "Pāfekuto Gia! Fushichō o Oe!!" (Japanese: 完全(パーフェクト)ギア！不死鳥を追え！！)	Ryō Miyata	Hideki Sonoda	January 28, 2022	November 5, 2022 (United States); August 20, 2022 (Malaysia); August 27, 2022 (Australia)
303	46	"Scorching-hot! Battle With the High King!!" / Aurora Bound! Chasing the Phoenix! (Part 2); Transliteration: "Shakunetsu! Haō to no Batoru!!" (Japanese: 灼熱！覇王との死闘(バトル)！！)	Yūichi Satō	Toshimichi Ōkawa	February 4, 2022	November 5, 2022 (United States); August 20, 2022 (Malaysia); August 27, 2022 (Australia)
304	47	"Great Uproar! Hell's Gate!!" / Disturbing Disturbance! Phantom's Gate! (Part 1); Transliteration: "Dai Haran! Makai no Mon!!" (Japanese: 大波乱！魔界の門！！)	Shigeru Yamazaki	Hideki Sonoda	February 11, 2022	November 12, 2022 (United States); August 28, 2022 (Australia)
305	48	"My Buddy! Extreme Battle!!" / Disturbing Disturbance! Phantom's Gate! (Part 2); Transliteration: "Ore no Aibō! Ekusutorīmu Batoru!!" (Japanese: 俺の相棒！エクストリームバトル！！)	Yoshiyuki Kumeda	Hideki Sonoda	February 18, 2022	November 12, 2022 (United States); August 28, 2022 (Australia)
306	49	"Great Clash! Bomber and Halo!!" / Ultimate Collision! Devastation and Ring of Light! (Part 1); Transliteration: "Dai Gekitotsu! Bakugeki to Kōrin!!" (Japanese: 大激突！爆撃と光輪！！)	Mizuki Sasaki	Toshimichi Ōkawa	February 25, 2022	November 19, 2022 (United States); September 3, 2022 (Australia)
307	50	"Bonds! Valt vs. Rashad!!" / Ultimate Collision! Devastation and Ring of Light! (Part 2); Transliteration: "Kizuna! Baruto Bāsasu Rashado!!" (Japanese: 絆！バルトVSラシャド！！)	Yūsuke Onoda	Toshimichi Ōkawa	March 4, 2022	November 19, 2022 (United States); September 3, 2022 (Australia)
308	51	"Dangerous vs. Greatest" / Prince vs Prince! Darkness and Light! (Part 1); Transliteration: "Denjarasu Bāsasu Gureitesuto" (Japanese: 魔王(デンジャラス)VS覇王(グレイテスト))	Sotsu Terada	Hideki Sonoda	March 11, 2022	November 26, 2022 (United States); September 4, 2022 (Australia)
309	52	"Explosion! Final Battle!!" / Prince vs Prince! Darkness and Light! (Part 2); Transliteration: "Bakuretsu! Fainaru Batoru!!" (Japanese: 爆裂！ファイナルバトル！！)	Dai Fukuyama	Hideki Sonoda	March 18, 2022	November 26, 2022 (United States); September 4, 2022 (Australia)

=== Beyblade Burst QuadStrike (2023) ===
No. overall	No. in season	English dub title / Japanese translated title	Directed by	Written by	Storyboarded by	English air date	Japanese air date
310	1	"Thunder and Lightning! Elemental Power!" / Erupting! Thunderous! Element Power! Transliteration: "Bakuretsu! Bakurai! Eremento Pawā!" (Japanese: 爆裂! 爆雷! エレメントパワー!!)	Dai Fukuyama	Hideki Sonoda	Oh Jin-Koo	April 3, 2023	TBA
311	2	"The Rebirth! Divine Belfyre!" / Explosive Birth! Divine Belial! Transliteration: "Bakutan! Divuain Beriaru!" (Japanese: 爆誕! ディヴァインベリアル!!)	Arisa Shima	Hideki Sonoda	Katsuhito Akiyama	April 4, 2023	TBA
312	3	"Rise Up! Gambit Dragon Soars!" / GT is Here! Gatling Dragon!! Transliteration: "Gachi Kita~a! Gatoringu Doragon!!" (Japanese: ガチ来たァ! ガトリングドラゴン!!)	Kiribi Takanashi	Toshimichi Okawa	Moto Terada	April 5, 2023	TBA
313	4	"Depths Below! Abyssal Tournament!" / Let's Do It, Heck Tournament!! Transliteration: "Yaru Ze Makai Tōnamento!!" (Japanese: やるぜッ魔界トーナメント！！)	Yoshito Hata	Toshimichi Okawa	Takeshi Mori	April 6, 2023	TBA
314	5	"Dragon vs. Pandora! Rising Tides!" / Roaring! Dragon vs. Pandora!! Transliteration: "Bakusō! Doragon VS Pandora!!" (Japanese: 爆走！ ドラゴンVSパンドラ！！)	Yusuke Onoda	Hideki Sonoda	Katsuhito Akiyama	April 7, 2023	TBA
315	6	"Howls of Terror! Kerbeus Returns!" / Kerbeus! The Guard Dog Returns!! Transliteration: "Kerubeusu! Kaettekita Tōken!!" (Japanese: ケルベウス！ 帰ってきた闘犬！！)	Akira Miyata	Toshimichi Okawa	Moto Terada	April 8, 2023	TBA
316	7	"Theater of the Dark Prince! Monstrous Missions!" / Demon King's Hell Mission Theater!! Transliteration: "Maō no Jigoku Misshon Gekijō!!" (Japanese: 魔王の地獄ミッション劇場！！)	Dai Fukuyama	Toshimichi Okawa	Oh Jin-Koo	April 15, 2023	TBA
317	8	"Peerless! Xiphoid Xcalius!" / Peerless! Xiphoid Xcalibur!! Transliteration: "Tenkaippin! Shifoido Ekusukaribā!!" (Japanese: 天下一品！ ジフォイドエクスカリバー！！)	Arisa Shima	Hideki Sonoda	Takeshi Mori	April 22, 2023	TBA
318	9	"Striking Flames! Ferocious Battle!" / Shakuenji Dojo! Ferocious Battle!! Transliteration: "Shakuenji Dōjō! Dai Gekitō!!" (Japanese: 灼炎寺道場！ 大激闘！！)	Chika Herube	Hideki Sonoda	Masatoshi Hakata	April 29, 2023	TBA
319	10	"Dark Devotion! Mighty Sword!" / Demon King vs. Unmatched!! Transliteration: "Maō Tai Musō!!" (Japanese: 魔王対無双！！)	Shigeru Yamazaki	Hideki Sonoda	Eran	May 6, 2023	TBA
320	11	"Surge Ahead! Battle Camp Clash!" / Sparking! Big Clash at the Battle Camp! Transliteration: "Supākingu! Batoru Kyanpu Dai Gekitotsu!" (Japanese: スパーキング！ バトルキャンプ大激突！)	Kiribi Takanashi	Toshimichi Okawa	Katsuhito Akiyama	May 13, 2023	TBA
321	12	"Hurricane Winds! Twister Pandora!" / The Third Element! Blasting Wind, Twister Pandora!! Transliteration: "Dai 3 no Eremento! Bakufū Tsuisutā Pandora!!" (Japanese: 第3のエレメント！ 爆風ツイスターパンドラ！！)	Ryou Miyata	Toshimichi Okawa	Amano Hiromasa	May 20, 2023	TBA
322	13	"Tag-Team! Break the Limit!" / Great Revolution! Tag Battle!! Transliteration: "Supākingu! Batoru Kyanpu Dai Gekitotsu!" (Japanese: 大乱間! タッグバトル!!)	Dai Fukuyama	Toshimichi Okawa	Takeshi Mori	May 27, 2023	TBA
323	14	"Turbo Time! Zeal Achilles!" / Super Z! Zest Achilles! Transliteration: "Chōzetsuda! Zesuto Akiresu!!" (Japanese: 超ゼツだ！ ゼストアキレス！！)	Arisa Shima	Hideki Sonoda	Yukihiro Matushita	July 1, 2023	TBA
324	15	"Chivalry Unbound! Whirl Knight!" / Knight of the Wind, Wind Knight!! Transliteration: "Kaze Tsukai no Kishi, Uindo Naito!!" (Japanese: 風使いの騎士ウインドナイト！！)	Yousuke Fujino	Toshimichi Okawa	Takeshi Mori	July 8, 2023	TBA
325	16	"Wild Dash! Battle Marathon!" / Explosive Dash! Battle Marathon!! Transliteration: "Bakuretsu Gekisō! Batoru Marason!!" (Japanese: 爆裂激走！ バトルマラソン！！)	Chika Herube	Toshimichi Okawa	Yoshiaki Okumura	July 15, 2023	TBA
326	17	"Blazing Battles! Aether Stadium!" / Crimson Battle, Aether Stadium!! Transliteration: "Kurenai no Batoru, Īsa Sutajiamu!!" (Japanese: 紅のバトル、イーサスタジアム！！)	Yusuke Onoda	Hideki Sonoda	Takeshi Mori	July 22, 2023	TBA
327	18	"Darkness Unleashed! Winds of Change!" / Explosive and Blasting!! Transliteration: "Bakuretsu to Bakufū!!" (Japanese: 爆裂と爆風！！)	Shigeki Awai	Toshimichi Okawa	Katsuhito Akiyama	July 29, 2023	TBA
328	19	"Champion's Challenge! Radiant Finals!" / Champion's Challenge! Decisive Battle in the Sky!! Transliteration: "Chanpion Charenji! Tenkū no Kessen!!" (Japanese: チャンピオンチャレンジ！ 天空の決戦！！)	Oh Jin-Koo	Hideki Sonoda	Akira Tsuchiya	August 5, 2023	TBA
329	20	"Invincible Shadows! Aiger vs. Bel!" / Super Z Strongest Aiga vs. Demon King Bell!! Transliteration: "Chōzetsu Saikyō Aiga VS Baō Beru!!" (Japanese: 超ゼツ最強アイガVS 魔王ベル！！)	Arisa Shima	Toshimichi Okawa	Takeshi Mori	August 12, 2023	October 30, 2023
330	21	"Dire Destiny! Ruin Pandemonium!" / Banmaden! Ruin Pandemonium!! Transliteration: "Banmaden! Rūin Pandemoniumu!!" (Japanese: 万魔殿！ ルーインパンデモニウム！！)	Gaku Shiga	Hideki Sonoda	Masatoshi Hakata	August 19, 2023	TBA
331	22	"Shining Stars! Lodestar Battle Tournament!" / Shining Stars! Element Battle Tournament!! Transliteration: "Senkō! Eremento Batoru Tōnamento!!" (Japanese: 戦光！ エレメントバトルトーナメント！！)	Shigeru Yamazaki	Hideki Sonoda	Takeshi Mori	November 4, 2023	TBA
332	23	"Vroom-Vroom Revolution! A Hero's Journey!" / Aim to be a Hero! Vroom-vroom Revolution!! Transliteration: "Mezase Hīrō! Gakkigaki Dai Funtō!!" (Japanese: 目指せヒーロー！ ガッキガキ大奮闘！！)	Yoshito Hata	Toshimichi Okawa	Yoshiaki Okumura	November 11, 2023	TBA
333	24	"Achilles vs. Pandemonium! Clashes of Light!" / Cho-Z vs. Purgatory's Black Flame!! Transliteration: "Chōzetsu Tai Rengoku no Kuro Honō!!" (Japanese: 超ゼツ 対 煉獄の黒炎！！)	Yusuke Onoda	Toshimichi Okawa	Takeshi Mori	November 18, 2023	TBA
334	25	"Resonance vs. Elemental!" / Resonance vs. Elemental! Transliteration: "Kyoumei vs Eremento!!" (Japanese: 共鳴VSエレメント！！)	Arisa Shima	Hideki Sonoda	Oh Jin-Koo	November 25, 2023	TBA
335	26	"Elemental Battle! Ultimate Showdown!" / Bursting with Intense Heat! Element Battle!! Transliteration: "Bakuretsu Gekinetsu! Eremento Batoru!!" (Japanese: 爆裂激熱！ エレメントバトル！！)	Oh Jin-Koo	Hideki Sonoda	Katsuhito Akiyama; Oh Jin-Koo	December 2, 2023	TBA
