= Rikuya Yasuda =

Japanese voice actor

- 安田 陸矢
- Born: 19 August 1998 (age 28); Nara Prefecture, Japan
- Occupation: Voice actor
- Years active: 2017–present
- Employer: Arts Vision
- Notable work: Cute High Earth Defense Club Happy Kiss! as Taishi Manza; Beyblade Burst Turbo as Fubuki Sumie; As Miss Beelzebub Likes as Mullin; Outburst Dreamer Boys as Futaba Mikuriya

Rikuya Yasuda (安田 陸矢, Yasuda Rikuya; born 19 August 1998) is a Japanese voice actor from Nara Prefecture. He is known for starring as Taishi Manza in Cute High Earth Defense Club Happy Kiss!, Fubuki Sumie in Beyblade Burst Turbo, Mullin in As Miss Beelzebub Likes, and Futaba Mikuriya in Outburst Dreamer Boys.

== Biography ==
Rikuya Yasuda, a native of Nara Prefecture, was born on 19 August 1998. While in junior high school, he started watching anime and, learning about the voice acting profession, became interested in voice actors who were active at events and live shows and in voice actor videos; hence, he decided to become a voice actor. He was later educated at the Japan Narration Acting Institute.

In 2018, he starred as Taishi Manza in Cute High Earth Defense Club Happy Kiss!, Fubuki Sumie in Beyblade Burst Turbo, and Mullin in As Miss Beelzebub Likes. In 2019, he starred as Futaba Mikuriya in Outburst Dreamer Boys.

His hobbies are mountain climbing and basketball, and his special skills are impersonations and general housework. He speaks the Nara dialect.

== Filmography ==
=== Television animation ===
Year	Title	Role	Ref.
2017	A Centaur's Life		
2017	ClassicaLoid		
2018	100 Sleeping Princes and the Kingdom of Dreams	Fuse	
2018	As Miss Beelzebub Likes	Mullin	
2018	Beyblade Burst Turbo	Fubuki Sumie	
2018	Cells at Work!		
2018	Citrus	Male character	
2018	Cute High Earth Defense Club Happy Kiss!	Taishi Manza	
2018	Magical Girl Site	Male student A, student D	
2018	Ongaku Shōjo		
2018	Yowamushi Pedal		
2018	Yuuna and the Haunted Hot Springs	Kami-kui	
2019	Girly Air Force	Arrow 02	
2019	Outburst Dreamer Boys	Futaba Mikuriya	
2020	Sorcerous Stabber Orphen	Comicron	
2021	Fushigi Dagashiya Zenitendō	Rikuto Minamikawa	
2022	Aoashi	Kengo Myojin	
2022	Bocchi the Rock!		
2022-2023	The Eminence in Shadow	Marco Granger	
2023	Chronicles of an Aristocrat Reborn in Another World	Danomu	
2023	Goblin Slayer		
2023	I'm in Love with the Villainess	Matt	
2023	Jujutsu Kaisen		
2023	The Tale of the Outcasts	Lucas Blackbell	
2024	'Tis Time for "Torture," Princess		
2024	2.5 Dimensional Seduction		
2024	Alya Sometimes Hides Her Feelings in Russian		
2024	Black Butler		
2024	Blue Archive the Animation		
2024	Delusional Monthly Magazine	Rin	
2024	KonoSuba		
2024	Synduality: Noir		
2024	That Time I Got Reincarnated as a Slime	Gobuemon	
2024	The Strongest Magician in the Demon Lord's Army Was a Human		
2024	Trillion Game	Nanamori	
2024	Vampire Dormitory		
2024	Villainess Level 99	Beth	
2024	Wind Breaker		
2025	I May Be a Guild Receptionist, But I'll Solo Any Boss to Clock Out on Time	Lowe Losblender	
2025	Hands Off: Sawaranaide Kotesashi-kun	Kōyō Kotesashi	
2026	The Daily Life of a Part-time Torturer	Noe	
2026	Tune In to the Midnight Heart	Arisu Yamabuki	
2026	The Case Book of Arne	Bernd	
2026	Killed Again, Mr. Detective?	Sakuya Outsuki	
2026	I Made Friends with the Second Prettiest Girl in My Class	Nozomu Seki	
2026	Smoking Behind the Supermarket with You	Obata	
2026	Dark Machine: The Animation	Weiss	
2026	Psyren	Ageha Yoshina	
TBA	Junket Bank	Akira Mitarai	
TBA	Millennium Family	Theo	

=== Animated film ===
Year	Title	Role	Ref.
2019	For Whom The Alchemist Exists		
2019	Is It Wrong to Try to Pick Up Girls in a Dungeon?: Arrow of the Orion		
2019	KonoSuba: God's Blessing on This Wonderful World! Legend of Crimson	Shikobei	
2020	Crayon Shin-chan: Crash! Graffiti Kingdom and Almost Four Heroes		
2025	Cute High Earth Defense Club Eternal Love!	Taishi Manza	

=== Original net animation ===
Year	Title	Role	Ref.
2021	Yusei High School Astronomy Club	Harumi Kasanoin	

=== Video games ===
Year	Title	Role	Ref.
2019	Quiz RPG: The World of Mystic Wiz	Villard Carmilla	
2021	Final Fantasy XIV: Endwalker	Erenville	
2024	Shin Megami Tensei V	Krusnik	
