= Shugo Nakamura =

Japanese voice actor and singer

- 仲村 宗悟
- Born: 28 July 1988 (age 38); Ginowan, Okinawa, Japan
- Occupations: Voice actor, singer
- Years active: 2015–present
- Agent: Across Entertainment
- Notable work: The Idolmaster SideM as Teru Tendo; TsukiPro as Issei Kuga; Young Disease Outburst Boy as Tomoki Takashima
- Awards: Best New Actor Award at the 13th Seiyu Awards

Shugo Nakamura (仲村 宗悟, Nakamura Shūgo; born 28 July 1988) is a Japanese voice actor and singer affiliated with Across Entertainment and Lantis. He is best known for voicing Teru Tendo in The Idolmaster SideM, Issei Kuga in TsukiPro, and Tomoki Takashima in Young Disease Outburst Boy.

== Biography ==
Shugo Nakamura, the youngest of four sons, was born on 28 July 1988 in Okinawa Prefecture, and moved to Tokyo after graduating high school. He became interested in music as a junior high school student, and he was a vocalist and guitarist for a local band. Although he intended to be a musician there, he decided to pursue an acting career after watching a stage performance, and he was subsequently educated at R&A Voice Actors Academy.

In 2015, he was cast as Teru Tendo in the SideM installment of The Idolmaster franchise, and subsequently appeared in both its anime television adaptation and the Wakeatte Mini! spinoff. His nickname Shugon (しゅごん) came from the idea of a listener to SideM's radio show, 315 Pro Night.

In 2016, Nakamura appeared as Issei Kuga in Quell, one of four musical groups in Tsukino Talent Production's TsukiPro idol anime. His character's tie-in single, SQ QUELL Kachōfūgetsu "Hana"-hen, was released on 23 March 2018, and it charted at #41 on the Oricon Singles Chart on 2 April.

In July 2019, Nakamura was cast as Tomoki Takashima in Young Disease Outburst Boy, the anime adaptation of the vocaloid song of the same name. The ending song of the anime, Here Comes The Sun, was Nakamura's first single; it was released on 30 October 2019, and it charted at #11 on the Oricon Singles Chart on 11 November. On 16 February 2020, Nakamura's second single, Colorful, was announced to be released on 11 March 2020.

Nakamura was one of four male voice actors who won the Best New Actor Award at the 13th Seiyu Awards in 2019. Nakamura ranked in second place at the 2017–2018 Newtype Anime Awards.

== Filmography ==
=== Anime series ===
2016

- Magi: Adventure of Sinbad as Knight
- Fastening Days 2 as Delivery Boy

2017

- The Idolmaster SideM as Teru Tendo
- TsukiPro the Animation as Issei Kuga

2018

- The Idolmaster SideM Wakeatte Mini! as Teru Tendo
- Zombie Land Saga as Newcomer

2019

- Young Disease Outburst Boy as Tomoki Takashima

2020

- Warlords of Sigrdrifa as Sou Ikeme

2021

- TsukiPro the Animation 2 as Issei Kuga

2022

- Game World Reincarnation as Spica Diafell (on-air version)
- Blue Lock as Gin Gagamaru
- Eternal Boys as Kento Takanashi

2023

- The Ice Guy and His Cool Female Colleague as Katori-kun
- Technoroid Overmind as Zin
- Opus Colors as Yuichi Shido

2024

- The Seven Deadly Sins: Four Knights of the Apocalypse as Jade

2025

- The Gorilla God's Go-To Girl as Arshent Adler
- Okitsura: Fell in Love with an Okinawan Girl, but I Just Wish I Knew What She's Saying as Tensuke Uema

2026

- Dark Moon: The Blood Altar as Jino
- Even a Replica Can Fall in Love as Haruka Yoshii
- Petals of Reincarnation as Hiroshi Funasaka

=== Anime films ===
2022

- Toku Touken Ranbu: Hanamaru ~Setsugetsuka~ as Chatannakiri
- The First Slam Dunk as Ryota Miyagi

=== Tokusatsu ===
2022

- Ultra Galaxy Fight: The Destined Crossroad as Ultraman Regulos

2023

- Ultraman Regulos as Ultraman Regulos
- Ultraman Regulos: First Mission as Ultraman Regulos

2026

- Ultraman New Generation Stars as Ultraman Regulos (Ep. 12)

=== Video games ===
2015

- The Idolmaster SideM as Teru Tendo
- Touken Ranbu as Chatannakiri

2017

- The Idolmaster SideM LIVE ON ST@GE! as Teru Tendo
- Tsukino Paradise as Issei Kuga

2018

- Caligula Effect: Overdose as Stork

2020

- Pokémon Masters EX as Ryuki

2021

- The Idolmaster SideM GROWING STARS as Teru Tendo

=== Multimedia projects ===
2020

- MILGRAM as Shidou Kirisaki

2023

- Fragaria Memories as Sanah

=== Dubbing ===
- Devil May Cry as VP Baines (Kevin Conroy and Ian James Corlett)
- Tarot as Lucas (Wolfgang Novogratz)
- Twisters as Praveen (Nik Dodani)
