= As Miss Beelzebub Likes =

Japanese manga and anime series

- First tankōbon volume cover

ベルゼブブ嬢のお気に召すまま。 (Beruzebubu-jō no Okinimesu Mama)
- Genre: Comedy, supernatural
- Manga
- Written by: matoba
- Published by: Square Enix
- English publisher: NA: Yen Press
- Imprint: Gangan Comics
- Magazine: Monthly Shōnen Gangan
- Original run: July 10, 2015 – May 12, 2020
- Volumes: 12
- Anime television series
- Directed by: Hiraku Kaneko (Note: According to animator Masaya Nozaki, who worked with Kaneko on several occasions, Minato Wato is a pseudonym of Kaneko's.)
- Produced by: Manami Kabashima; Kenji Kanbayashi; Shōta Komatsu; Yoshinori Hasegawa; Yoshiyuki Shioya; Nobuhiro Nakayama; Issei Yasui
- Written by: Yoriko Tomita
- Music by: Kanon Wakeshima; Naoki Chiba
- Studio: Liden Films
- Licensed by: Crunchyroll (streaming); NA: Discotek Media (home video); SEA: Medialink
- Original network: ABC, Tokyo MX, GTV, GYT, BS11, TVA
- Original run: October 11, 2018 – December 27, 2018
- Episodes: 12
- icon

As Miss Beelzebub Likes (ベルゼブブ嬢のお気に召すまま。, Beruzebubu-jō no Okinimesu Mama), also known as As Miss Beelzebub Likes It, is a Japanese comedy manga series written and illustrated by matoba. It was serialized in Square Enix's Monthly Shōnen Gangan magazine from July 2015 to May 2020, with its chapters collected into twelve tankōbon volumes. The series is licensed by Yen Press. An anime television series adaptation by Liden Films aired from October to December 2018.

== Plot ==
Set in Pandemonium, the administrative center of the Demon Realm, where fallen angels work to carry out their duties in preparation for the Last Judgment. The realm is ruled by Beelzebub, a former angel cast out of Heaven, who serves as a high-ranking administrator overseeing the operations of Pandemonium and the devils who work there.

The story follows Mullin, a new assistant who begins working for Beelzebub. He expects her to be a fearsome and imposing ruler, but instead he discovers that she is gentle, absent-minded, and obsessed with fluffy and cute things. As Mullin adjusts to serving Beelzebub, he interacts with the other devils of Pandemonium, each with their own unusual personalities.

== Characters ==
Beelzebub (ベルゼブブ, Beruzebubu)
Voiced by: Saori Ōnishi
A young girl with long blond hair and blue eyes. Beelzebub is a former Seraph and the current ruler of Pandemonium following the unexplained disappearance of Satan. While most demons look up to her for her skills as a capable and intelligent ruler, in private she is a ditzy airhead who rules only because it is her job and loves anything fluffy; in fact, her lifelong dream is to become one big ball of fluff. She enjoys teasing her Head Attendant, Mullin, and frequently embarrasses him for her own amusement. She falls in love with him after an incident where he protected her from thugs, but as she has had no experience with men she does not understand what her feelings are.
Mullin (ミュリン, Myurin)
Voiced by: Rikuya Yasuda
Mullin is a young male demon with light blue-purple hair and tiny green eyes. He is Beelzebub's Head Attendant and prefers all work to run smoothly and efficiently. He has some tsundere characteristics with other demons claiming he has the "pure heart of a maiden." He is easily embarrassed and will blush whenever he is exposed to Beelzebub's naked body or anything to do with sex. He is often frustrated by Beelzebub's behavior and while he respects her leadership skills, he is more than willing to scold her ditzy airheaded behavior. He is strongly attracted to her and often cannot handle how cute she is. He is highly protective of her and has at least some ability to fight as he quickly dealt with two thugs harassing Beelzebub when she was lost in the city.
Belphegor (ベルフェゴール, Berufegōru)
Voiced by: Misaki Kuno
A young female demon with pink hair and red eyes, she is the former Principality of Heaven. She suffers from severe social anxiety and is scared of almost everybody, except for Beelzebub, whom she always runs to and hides behind. Her anxiety means she shakes from fear almost constantly and also has a nervous bladder that causes her to urinate when she is really frightened, meaning she dashes to the bathroom several times a minute. She appears to have a crush on Azazel as she is extra nervous around him, upset when she thought he was mad at her and happily accepted a bag of cookies from Mullin after learning Azazel baked them.
Azazel (アザゼル, Azazeru)
Voiced by: Satoshi Hino
A tall and muscular demon with a serious demeanor, silver hair, and brown eyes who used to be a Cherub. Despite his serious appearance, he is actually extremely kind and friendly. He almost never speaks out loud, preferring to communicate with messages written on display boards and can only be heard talking in his head. He secretly loves cute things like puppies and kittens and collects stuffed toys he keeps in his room, especially teddy bears. The only meal he will eat from the castle's canteen is teddy bear pancakes. He is skilled enough at sewing that he can make his own stuffed animals, which he frequently is asked to do by Beelzebub, and is also able to bake his own cookies. He has a crush on Belphegor and hates that his appearance frightens her and has tried several methods of making himself seem less scary.
Sargatanas (サルガタナス, Sarugatanasu)
Voiced by: Ai Kakuma
A tall and strict female demon with brown eyes and short purple hair except for two long strands that almost reach the floor. She is Astaroth's assistant and spends most of her time chasing him down and forcing him to return to work. Despite her calm and collected appearance she is actually an open sadist, frequently punishing Astaroth violently or threatening to shoot him with her twin pistols, especially when he draws attention to her flat chest. Her position in Pandemonium's finance department allows her to maintain a secret stash of money to repair any damages caused by her violent methods of forcing Astaroth to actually do his job. Despite her violence she also enjoys cute things similar to Azazel, though unlike Azazel she prefers to keep her hobby a secret. She has a secret crush on Astaroth and becomes embarrassed whenever he says anything nice to her.
Astaroth (アスタロト, Asutaroto)
Voiced by: Yoshitsugu Matsuoka
A male former Angel with blond hair and gold eyes who sometimes uses fake angel wings to impress women. He is now Pandemonium's Minister of Finance, in control of all the money and department budgets, though he has been known to waste or misspend the budgets recklessly. He chose to fall from Heaven shortly after Beelzebub did due to his crush on her and often tries to communicate his feelings, though his methods make him come across as a stalker. He was surprised that Beelzebub seemed to like Mullin more than himself as he considers Mullin boring and unimpressive. He likes to refer to himself as Beelzebub's older brother, though they are not related.
Eurynome (エウリノーム, Eurinōmu)
Voiced by: Chinatsu Akasaki
A female glasses-wearing demon with long blue hair and green eyes who works in Pandemonium's Justice Department. While working she is very professional and, according to Mullin, very cool; but, in secret, she has a fetish for boys in Elementary School, though she only ever watches them from a distance. Her fetish means she considers grown men to be unappealing and the only way she can stand talking with them is by using her powerful imagination, a power she calls Wings of Imagination, to picture all grown men in their young boy forms. She dislikes Astaroth because of his insincere, promiscuous personality, much preferring his fragile, needy young boy form she sees in her imagination. She appears to have a more substantial crush on Dantalion due to his extremely youthful appearance.
Dantalion (ダンタリオン, Dantarion)
Voiced by: Aoi Yūki
A youthful looking male demon with blue hair, blue eyes and blue rabbit ears. He is the librarian of Pandemonium's library who has both Bibliomania and Bibliophilia. His favorite activity is reading books at night, meaning he often falls asleep at his desk, whilst talking to people and even when standing up. He possesses an ability to determine exactly what book a person would most want to read, correctly guessing Mullin's favorite author after only knowing him for a few seconds. He is friends with Azazel and uses Molech as a stepladder to reach high shelves. Though he refers to Molech as "Senpai" he is usually the one ordering Molech around. He claims to have read every book within the library, of which there are over 700 million. Based on the amount of time it would take to read so many books Mullin calculates that the youthful looking Dantalion may actually be one of the oldest demons in Pandemonium.
Molech (モレク, Moreku)
Voiced by: Kazuyuki Okitsu
An extremely energetic, overeager and loud male demon with brown hair, green eyes and glasses. He is one of the oldest demons in Pandemonium making him almost as important as Beelzebub, however, unlike Beelzebub he delegates all his work to his subordinates so he can focus on his real passion, doing whatever Dantalion tells him to.
Nisroch (ニスロク, Nisuroku)
Voiced by: Shinobu Matsumoto
A tall male demon with orange hair and eyes. He is the former Principality of the Garden of Eden who guarded the Forbidden fruit. He is now Beelzebub's personal chef and is proud of this fact, even being moved to tears when Beelzebub asked for a lesson in cooking, thinking she wanted to learn so she would not need him anymore. He is skilled enough that he can cook an entire meal in 3 seconds, moving at such high speeds his clothes are torn off.
Adrammelech (アドラメレク, Adoramereku)
Voiced by: Masaya Onosaka
A male former Thrones Demon with styled purple hair, a hat decorated with a ribbon, a military jacket around his shoulders and a wide collared shirt left unbuttoned. Despite being a male demon he is quite feminine and prefers his nickname, Lady Ad, instead of his full name. He adores anything pretty and is slightly narcissistic as he blushed after seeing his own reflection. He works for Pandemonium's Apparel and Design Department in charge of everything art related and is responsible for Beelzebub's personal clothing and ceremonial regalia.
Buer (ブエル, Bueru)
Voiced by: Shiori Izawa
A female demon with the head of a lion, ribbon decorations woven into her hair and wearing a black dress under a short sleeved white lab coat. She is the Head doctor of Pandemonium's infirmary.
Morrigan (モリガン, Morigan)
Voiced by: Aya Suzaki
A Succubus with long light blue hair tied with a pink bow, darker blue horns and a white dress with military epaulette's on the shoulders. She works as a Section Chief in Pandemonium's Seduction Department and works closely with Adrammelech.
Narrator
Voiced by: Kikuko Inoue

== Media ==
=== Manga ===
Written and illustrated by matoba, As Miss Beelzebub Likes was serialized in Square Enix's shōnen manga magazine Monthly Shōnen Gangan from July 10, 2015, to May 12, 2020. Square Enix collected its chapters in twelve tankōbon volumes, released from March 12, 2016, to July 10, 2020.

English manga publisher Yen Press announced during their panel at Sakura-Con on April 15, 2017, that they had licensed the series.

==== Volumes ====
No.	Original release date	Original ISBN	English release date	English ISBN
1	March 12, 2016	978-4-7575-4902-9	April 24, 2018	978-0-3164-4768-3
2	August 22, 2016	978-4-7575-5074-2	June 26, 2018	978-0-3164-4771-3
3	November 22, 2016	978-4-7575-5151-0	September 18, 2018	978-0-3164-4775-1
4	March 22, 2017	978-4-7575-5272-2	December 11, 2018	978-0-3164-4778-2
5	August 22, 2017	978-4-7575-5437-5	March 26, 2019	978-1-9753-8393-0
6	December 22, 2017	978-4-7575-5550-1	June 18, 2019	978-1-9753-8394-7
7	April 21, 2018	978-4-7575-5691-1	September 24, 2019	978-1-9753-8397-8
8	September 21, 2018	978-4-7575-5844-1	December 17, 2019	978-1-9753-8739-6
9	December 22, 2018	978-4-7575-5930-1 (regular ed.); 978-4-7575-5931-8 (special ed.)	April 21, 2020	978-1-9753-0928-2
10	May 11, 2019	978-4-7575-6114-4	July 21, 2020	978-1-9753-0931-2
11	November 12, 2019	978-4-7575-6338-4	December 8, 2020	978-1-9753-1670-9
12	July 10, 2020	978-4-7575-6740-5	June 18, 2021	978-1-9753-2342-4

=== Anime ===
An anime television series adaptation was announced on April 12, 2018. The series is directed by Hiraku Kaneko and written by Yoriko Tomita, with animation by studio Liden Films. Etsuko Sumimoto is the character designer, while Satoshi Motoyama is the sound director. Kanon Wakeshima and naotyu- composed the series' music. The series aired from October 11 to December 27, 2018, on ABC and other channels. (Note: ABC listed the show at 26:50 on October 10, which is at October 11, 2018 at 2:50 a.m.) The opening theme is "Pink Lemonade" (ピンクレモネード, Pinku Remonēdo) performed by Sangatsu no Phantasia, while the ending theme is a character song titled "Akuma de Koiwazurai" (あくまで恋煩い, Stubbornly Lovesick) and performed by Saori Ōnishi, Misaki Kuno, and Ai Kakuma. Crunchyroll streamed the series and it ran for 12 episodes.

==== Episodes ====
No.	Title (Note: All English titles are taken from Crunchyroll.)	Original release date
1	"Boy Meets Fluffy Girl."; Transliteration: "Boi mītsu mofugāru." (Japanese: ボーイ・ミーツ・モフみガール。)	October 11, 2018
1	"Her Highness Knows Not Her Assistant's Heart."; Transliteration: "Kinji no Kokoro, kakka shirazu." (Japanese: 近侍の心、閣下知らず。)	October 11, 2018
Pandemonium is a paradise populated by demons who run Pandemonium in Satan's absence. Beelzebub, a former Seraph, now rules Pandemonium and many demons look up to her as she is an expert ruler. However, in private she is ditzy, airheaded and loves anything fluffy. Her head attendant, Mullin finds her asleep, naked and surrounded by fluffy White Gossamers, embarrassing Mullin who finds her cute but infuriating. Beelzebub frequently amuses herself by teasing him. Mullin learns Beelzebub trusts him a lot he is the only attendant she is willing to complain to. Realising he may have upset her by running away Mullin gives her Alpacca wool sweater, so she can feel fluffiness without sleeping naked. Beelzebub is happy Mullin does not hate her. Beelzebub explains demons do not cause human sin, they provide opportunities to sin or not to sin so God can judge them accurately. One of Beelzebub's duties is to make sure demons living in Pandemonium are content. Mullin worries she may be in danger until he learns she fought in the war against Heaven and was second only to Satan. Despite this Mullin gets angry that she keeps wandering away from him while in town. They argue and Beelzebub ends up getting lost. Mullin beats up two demons harassing her in a bad neighborhood and gets angry at her for worrying him as he kabedons her. As they return home Beelzebub sends Mullin away as his protectiveness of her has confused her and made her heart race. Mullin worries he has overstepped and might lose his job. Beelzebub finally uses her new sweater.
2	"Brother Tastes Like a Fairy Tale."; Transliteration: "Aniki wa meruhen nao aji." (Japanese: 兄貴はメルヘンなお味。)	October 18, 2018
2	"She's Here, Vibration Girl"; Transliteration: "Tōjō, baiburēshongāru." (Japanese: 登場、バイブレーションガール。)	October 18, 2018
Beelzebub has gotten even lazier and now has White Gossamers in her office. Mullin trips downstairs but is caught by Azazel, a tall muscular demon whom Mullin immediately looks up to, at least until Azazel reveals he is shy and only communicates via display boards. Mullin follows him hoping to learn how to be manly, but is frustrated since Azazel only eats teddy bear pancakes and makes his own stuffed toys in his room. Beelzebub arrives to pick up a teddy bear she asked Azazel to make for her. Mullin assures Azazel he is not disappointed after learning about his hobbies and Azazel hugs him, until Beelzebub jealously pushes them apart. Mullin finds a young demon, Belphegor, outside Beelzebub's office. She is so scared of him she almost pees herself, until Beelzebub throws her into the bathroom. Belphegor has social anxiety and a nervous bladder, meaning she pees whenever she is scared. Azazel arrives and Belphegor is so scared she runs away, depressing Azazel. Beelzebub is forcibly dragged to her next meeting while Mullin tries to make Azazel less scary. They try several methods but nothing works. When Azazel learns Mullin has never received Valentine chocolates he gives him cookies he baked himself. Mullin runs into Belphegor again who is worried that Azazel is mad she ran away. Mullin assures her he is not and gives her some of the cookies. Belphegor plans to treasure them rather than eat them as she likes Azazel, though Mullin is too dense to realise.
3	"Former Angel with Wings."; Transliteration: "Tsubasa o tsuketa moto tenshi (Enjeru)." (Japanese: 翼をつけた元天使（エンジェル）。)	October 25, 2018
3	"The Assistant, a Complete Sadist"; Transliteration: "Sono kinji, doesu ni tsuki." (Japanese: その近侍、ドSにつき。)	October 25, 2018
Mullin and Beelzebub have a working lunch at a café, only Mullin becomes flustered when he realises everyone else at the café are couples. This worsens when Beelzebub tries to feed him parfait with her spoon. They encounter Astaroth, a former angel wearing fake wings to impress women. He identifies Mullin as boring and is shocked to realise Beelzebub likes Mullin more than him. While praising Beelzebub's beauty he reveals he is actually Beelzebub's stalker and only fell from Heaven because Beelzebub fell first and he followed her. Mullin comments that Beelzebub and Astaroth look good together since they are both more attractive than him which upsets Beelzebub so she leaves. Astaroth follows and she explains Mullin's comment made her sad, though she is not sure why. Mullin asks Beelzebub to go to the café again next time they are in town, making her happy. Astaroth begins observing Mullin, who at first seems dull but does possess some potential boyfriend qualities, despite sometimes acting more like Beelzebub's mother. Astaroth's assistant arrives, a cool but sadistic female demon named Sargatanas who controls Astaroth through cruel and unusual punishment and returns him to his own office. She reveals she also loves cute things but asks Mullin to keep this secret. She becomes embarrassed when Astaroth says he likes her despite her cruelty, revealing she has a crush on him.
4	"Fly! Imaginary Wings."; Transliteration: "Habatake! Sōzō no Tsubasa." (Japanese: 羽ばたけ！想像の翼。)	November 1, 2018
4	"Her Highness Checking in on Someone Sick for the First Time."; Transliteration: "Kakka, hajimete no o mimai." (Japanese: 閣下、はじめてのお見舞い。)	November 1, 2018
Mullin meets Eurynome, a former Cherub working in Pandemonium's Justice Department. He is impressed by her professionalism but she quickly confuses him by making strange faces. He then discovers she is a secret pervert who likes young boys; though she insists it is just a hobby and she only watches from a distance. Astaroth tries to flirt with her but she is completely immune to him, until she imagines what he would look like as a child and becomes excited. Sargatanas arrives to collect Astaroth only to punish him for mentioning her flat chest. Beelzebub wants to go on another date with Mullin and is overjoyed when he wins movie tickets and invites her, though he believes her enthusiasm is because she really wants to see the movie. Beelzebub is too excited and stays awake all night while Mullin spends all night worrying about whether seeing a movie counts as a date and catches a cold. Beelzebub and Azazel try to help him recover. Mullin tells Beelzebub to see the movie with Azazel, though Beelzebub insists on staying with Mullin. Azazel is horrified to learn the tickets were for a gory zombie movie. Mullin eventually falls asleep and Beelzebub almost kisses him while checking his temperature with her forehead before running back to her room panicking and confused. The next day Mullin recovers but finds Beelzebub has caught his cold.
5	"A Bit Bitter, Bibliomania."; Transliteration: "Choppiri bitā, biburiomania." (Japanese: ちょっぴりビター、ビブリオマニア。)	November 8, 2018
5	"Go Forth, With Brownies."; Transliteration: "Susume, buraunī to tomoni." (Japanese: 進め, ブラウニーとともに。)	November 8, 2018
Azazel invites Mullin to Pandemonium's library to meet Dantalion, the librarian who can tell exactly which book a person should read, and Molech, one of the oldest demons in Pandemonium who leaves all his work to his subordinates so he can spend his time helping Dantalion reach books on high shelves. Mullin spots Eurynome who reveals she has a crush on Dantalion. Dantalion explains the library holds over 700 million books and he has read them all. Based on the time needed to manage such a feat Mullin realises Dantalion must actually be one of the oldest demons in Pandemonium, possibly older than Beelzebub and far too old for the unaware Eurynome. Belphegor asks Beelzebub for help making a dessert for Azazel so she has a reason to talk to him. Beelzebub asks her personal chef, Nisroch, for help but he cooks at such high speeds his clothes are blown off, terrifying Belphegor. She and Beelzebub work together and manage to bake brownies, though Belphegor panics when she realises she now has to actually give them to Azazel. With some encouragement she manages to talk to Azazel who is so happy he asks if he and Belphegor can bake something together. This overwhelms Belphegor so much she passes out. Beelzebub gives some brownies to Mullin, who in turn gives her an Encyclopaedia of Fluffiness from the library, bringing them closer together.
6	"9 Centimeters."; Transliteration: "9-Senchi-bun." (Japanese: 9センチ分の。)	November 15, 2018
6	"Her Highness's Secret"; Transliteration: "Kakka no himitsu." (Japanese: 閣下の秘密。)	November 15, 2018
Beelzebub breaks the heel of her shoe so Mullin tries to carry her but is embarrassed at being so close to her breasts. They meet Adrammelech, Beelzebub's clothing designer, so he can fix her heel. Beelzebub is depressed without her heels as she is now 9 cm shorter and feels her reduced height has taken her away from Mullin, at least until her heels are repaired and she is able to be close to him again. Beelzebub dreams about God casting her from heaven with a bolt of lightning. She takes part in a magazine interview where she manages not to reveal her laziness or love for fluffiness and claims there is nothing she dislikes. As Beelzebub relaxes in the garden it starts raining and Azazel warns Mullin to find her immediately. He finds her hiding and realizes she is scared of lightning. He manages to make her smile but they become embarrassed when the next lightning bolt causes her to jump onto his lap. She is happy that Mullin does not think less of her despite knowing about her phobia and makes him promise to keep it their secret. Later Mullin continues to be impressed by Beelzebub's ability to concentrate when required but it is shown she has actually been daydreaming about romance with Mullin during the primeval times the whole time.
7	"The Pandemonium Baths Are Great. You Should Visit."; Transliteration: "Pandemo yu yoi toko ichido wa oide." (Japanese: パンデモ湯よいとこ一度はおいで。)	November 22, 2018
7	"I Want to Learn More..."; Transliteration: ""Motto shiritai" no ni..." (Japanese: "もっと知りたい"のに···。)	November 22, 2018
Buer, the Head Doctor, informs Beelzebub that no one in Pandemonium is getting enough exercise, so Beelzebub decides to open a gym. Astaroth, who is actually the Minister of Finance, decides to build a bath house as well, but spends the whole budget on the baths with no money left for the gym. Everyone decides to take a bath together. Astaroth tries to peek at the girls but almost drowns trying to find a way under the wall. Instead he tries to peek on the girls changing area while Mullin tries to stop him. They are caught by Sargatanas who punishes Astaroth while Mullin is devastated that Beelzebub now thinks he is a peeping tom. Beelzebub learns from Belphegor that Mullin owns a pet dog and later learns from Mullin that he is a big brother to twin sisters. She becomes depressed that she knows nothing about Mullin as she was always too nervous to ask him personal questions. Astaroth offers to help her practise asking personal questions and is swiftly restrained by Sargatanas when he asks what color Beelzebub's underwear is. Beelzebub later panics over what question to ask Mullin first and accidentally asks him what color his underwear is.
8	"I Want to Say "Cute.""; Transliteration: "Kawaii tte iitai." (Japanese: かわいいって言いたい。)	November 29, 2018
8	"Let's Go to the Beach."; Transliteration: "Umi ni ikou." (Japanese: 海に行こう。)	November 29, 2018
Beelzebub's White Gossamers have become very popular in Pandemonium with TV shows, themed cafes and merchandise. Sargatanas, who loves Gossamers, wants to visit a café but is afraid to draw attention to herself. She visits the café in disguise but the disguise draws attention anyway. She ends up at the same table as Azazel, who is also a Gossamer fan. Despite her embarrassment at being found out he helps make her feel better about not hiding her true self. Beelzebub visits the café with Mullin and ends up buying all the Gossamer merchandise. Belphegor want to go to the beach but is afraid to meet strange men so Beelzebub offers to take her to a private beach with Mullin and Azazel. Mullin panics at having to wear his swimsuit in front of Beelzebub and asks Azazel to make him more muscular. Beelzebub and Belphegor ask Adrammelech for help choosing bikinis but Belphegor panics at showing so much skin. After much embarrassment they find acceptable bikinis, though Beelzebub insists on showing Mullin straight away and is happy when he agrees it looks good on her. Belphegor is happy Beelzebub is in love with Mullin. The following day the beach trip is cancelled due to a storm.
9	"They Pass Each Other by Sometimes."; Transliteration: "Futari, tokidoki surechigai." (Japanese: ふたり、ときどきすれ違い。)	December 6, 2018
9	"I had a Dream."; Transliteration: "Yume wo mita kara." (Japanese: 夢を見たから。)	December 6, 2018
Beelzebub tries to finish her work quickly to impress Mullin, but Mullin mistakenly believes she has done no work and threatens to take a job in the library with Dantalion. Beelzebub tells Belphegor about the time she almost kissed Mullin and wonders if Mullin hates her. Mullin assures Beelzebub he would never take the job. Beelzebub apologises for being difficult. The narrator point out this is their first lovers quarrel, though neither is aware of it. Belphegor has an embarrassing dream of confessing her love to Azazel. Azazel saves her from some falling books so she tries to say "I like you" but accidentally says "Memorandum" then flees to the bathroom. Mullin falls asleep and Beelzebub hears him dreaming about her. Azazel falls asleep so Adrammelech ties flowers into his ponytail. Sargatanas falls asleep so Astaroth escapes from the office. Belphegor falls asleep so Azazel carefully puts a blanket on her so she will not wake up and become scared. Dantalion is awoken by Molech which angers Eurynome who had been watching him sleep. Beelzebub falls asleep and Mullin panics at what to do with her. He settles for moving her hair out of her face then panics when he is caught by one of his secretaries. Beelzebub becomes embarrassed herself as she had woken up halfway through Mullin's panicking but been too embarrassed to open her eyes.
10	"Separated by One Can of Coffee."; Transliteration: "Kan kōhī 1 honbun no kyori." (Japanese: 缶コーヒー1本分の距離。)	December 13, 2018
10	"Your Scent on a Cold Day."; Transliteration: "Samui hi, anata no kaori." (Japanese: 寒い日、あなたの香り。)	December 13, 2018
Sargatanas retrieves Astaroth from his latest attempt to avoid work but is convinced by him to get canned coffee. Sargatanas observes couples in the park and is torn between wanting to be closer to Astaroth and hiding her true feelings. Astaroth thanks her for looking after him and claims he likes her. Sargatanas is upset that he probably says that to all his girlfriends but is shocked when Astaroth rests his head on her shoulder, overwhelming her emotionally. Astaroth disappears again and the secretaries notice Sargatanas is happiest whenever she is chasing him. Pandemonium is hit by a snowstorm, depressing Beelzebub who hates feeling cold and cannot even be cheered up with fluffy arctic animals. Mullin suggests Beelzebub change into her winter uniform, though Mullin is still embarrassed as the winter uniform covers her skin but accentuates her breasts. Beelzebub is happy to be warmer but becomes depressed again as she can no longer feel the fluffiness of her pet Gossamers on her skin. Mullin gives her his scarf to warm up. Later Mullin is worried Beelzebub's red face and constant sniffing means she has caught a cold, when really she was constantly smelling the scarf with Mullin's scent on it.
11	"Gocchin in Merryland."; Transliteration: "Gotchin IN merīrando." (Japanese: ごっちん・IN・メリーランド。)	December 20, 2018
Belphegor has been having dreams in which she is able to talk to Azazel. Beelzebub invites Azazel to join everyone for coffee at a botanical garden but he refuses in case he scares Belphegor again. At the garden Mullin is properly introduced to Morrigan and Caim, Belphegor's assistant who is surprised Beelzebub is close to Mullin given that she had a very sheltered youth. Caim, who has known Belphegor her whole life, is worried she is even worse with men than Beelzebub. Belphegor accidentally drinks Adrammelech's wine and becomes drunk. She is found by Azazel and drunkenly assumes she is dreaming again. She clings to him and refuses to let go. Azazel is surprised she is not scared of him and tries to ask the real reason she always runs away, but she passes out. Azazel is happy now he knows Belphegor is not scared of him and carries her back to the garden. Later when Azazel and Belphegor meet in the hall Belphegor is nervous at having embarrassed herself, leading Azazel to assume she really is scared of him after all, so he avoids her. This upsets Belphegor so Beelzebub consoles her. In the end Belphegor and Azazel are further apart than ever.
12	"Her Assistant Knows Not Her Highness's Heart."; Transliteration: "Kakka no Kokoro, kinji shirazu." (Japanese: 閣下の心、近侍知らず。)	December 27, 2018
12	"The Name of That Feeling Is..."; Transliteration: "Sono kimochi no Namae wa." (Japanese: その気持ちの名前は。)	December 27, 2018
While having a fluffy dream about Mullin one of Beelzebub's Gossamers accidentally unravels half the Alpaca wool sweater Mullin gave her. She becomes depressed and Mullin is concerned he has somehow upset her again. Beelzebub asks Adrammelech to reknit the sweater before Mullin finds out she damaged his gift. The next morning Beelzebub is back to her old self, leaving Mullin even more confused. As it is spring every department in Pandemonium is planning flower viewing parties. As Beelzebub has never been to a flower viewing party Mullin decides to organise one for her with all her friends. At the party Beelzebub tries KFC for the first time and enjoys it. Belphegor gets to eat cookies made by Azazel and faints from joy. Sargatanas realises she actually enjoys looking after Astaroth. Mullin panics when Beelzebub disappears trying to catch falling blossom petals, then when she reappears they both become embarrassed but happy. As the party ends Mullin gives Beelzebub a petal he managed to catch, making her very happy. As the episode ends Beelzebub still cannot identify the emotion she feels for Mullin but she will someday as their story continues as she catches a petal on her own which lands on Mullin's petal.

== See also ==
- Studio Apartment, Good Lighting, Angel Included, another manga series by the same author
