= Outburst Dreamer Boys =

Japanese light novel series

- First light novel volume cover

厨病激発ボーイ (Chūbyō Gekihatsu Bōi)
- Light novel
- Written by: Rerulili; Minato Tonami
- Illustrated by: Hoshima
- Published by: Kadokawa Shoten
- Imprint: Kadokawa Beans Bunko
- Original run: January 1, 2016 – August 1, 2018
- Volumes: 5
- Manga
- Written by: Rerulili; Minato Tonami
- Illustrated by: Megumi Hazuki
- Published by: Shueisha
- Magazine: Ribon Special
- Original run: July 15, 2016 – December 15, 2016
- Volumes: 2
- Light novel

Chūbyō Gekihatsu Boy: Seishun Shōkōgun
- Written by: Rerulili; Minato Tonami
- Illustrated by: Hoshima; Koji Milk; Akira Ookami
- Published by: Kadokawa Shoten
- Imprint: Kadokawa Beans Bunko
- Original run: January 1, 2018 – October 1, 2019
- Volumes: 5
- Anime television series
- Directed by: Kazuya Ichikawa
- Written by: Midori Gotou
- Music by: Satoshi Motoyama
- Studio: Studio Deen
- Licensed by: Sentai Filmworks: SEA: Muse Communication
- Original network: Tokyo MX, BS11, KBS, SUN, Aichi Television Broadcasting, AT-X
- Original run: October 4, 2019 – December 13, 2019
- Episodes: 11 + OVA
- Light novel

Chūbyō Gekihatsu Boy: Pride Chōshinsei
- Written by: Rerulili; Minato Tonami
- Illustrated by: Hoshima; Koji Milk; Akira Ookami
- Published by: Kadokawa Shoten
- Imprint: Kadokawa Beans Bunko
- Original run: August 1, 2020 – present
- Volumes: 2

Outburst Dreamer Boys (厨病激発ボーイ, Chūbyō Gekihatsu Bōi), sometimes also called Young Disease Outburst Boy, is a Japanese mixed-media project which started as a Vocaloid song series by Rerulili. The light novel adaptations are written by Rerulili and Minato Tonami, with illustrations by Hoshima, MW, Koji Milk and Akira Ookami, and published by Kadokawa Shoten under their Kadokawa Beans Bunko label. A manga adaptation with illustrations by Megumi Hazuki was serialized in Shueisha's Ribon Special magazine from July 15, 2016, to December 15, 2016, and compiled into a single tankōbon volume. An 11-episode anime television series adaptation aired between October 4, 2019, and December 13, 2019. The series was directed by Kazuya Ichikawa and animated by Studio Deen, with scripts written by Midori Gotou. It is licensed in North America by Sentai Filmworks.

== Synopsis ==
When Mizuki Hijiri transferred into a new school, hoping for a peaceful high school life. That did not occur instead she met the infamous Hero Club, a group of students affected by chuunibyou syndrome. Her new friends-Yamato Noda a superhero fan and an athlete, Tomoki Takashima 2D-girls obsessed otaku, Kazuhiro Nakamura a supposed forbidden union of a demon and an angel, and Rei Tsukumo a self-proclaimed schemer. The Hero Club decided that Mizuki is one of their own and involve her in their activities to help out other students with their problems.

== Characters ==
Mizuki Hijiri (聖 瑞姫, Hijiri Mizuki)
Voiced by: Chinatsu Akasaki
An ordinary girl who transfers to Minakami High School. She wants to live a peaceful high school life, but she is influenced by the Hero Club. However, she always tries to protect the club from being disestablish. She plays as the pink ranger in the Hero Club.
Yamato Noda (野田 大和, Noda Yamato)
Voiced by: Daiki Yamashita
A member of the Hero Club. He has an optimistic attitude and will proudly face anything. He often wears a tracksuit and a red and white hat with a brim on top. He has a exceptional athletic capability. He is trusted by other track and field clubs as a helper because of his athletic ability. He plays as the red ranger in the Hero Club.
Tomoki Takashima (高嶋 智樹, Takashima Tomoki)
Voiced by: Shugo Nakamura
A member of the Hero Club. A handsome student, known for his love for 2D female characters, such as Sora from a smartphone game name "ILive!". He plays as the yellow ranger in The Hero Club.
Kazuhiro Nakamura (中村 和博, Nakamura Kazuhiro)
Voiced by: Hideaki Kabumoto
A member of the Hero Club. He portrays that his real name is Toga Ryushoin, and has a dark god on his right arm. He is a prodigy in his class, however he lacks socializing skills. He plays as the black ranger in the Hero Club.
Rei Tsukumo (九十九 零, Tsukumo Rei)
Voiced by: Junya Enoki
A member of the Hero Club. A handsome student, he is relatively a reasonable person. He plays as the purple ranger of the Hero Club.
Futaba Mikuriya (厨 二葉, Mikuriya Futaba)
Voiced by: Rikuya Yasuda
A student who returns to highschool, who later joined the Hero Club. After transferring school, he suddenly becomes a popular student in class. He always acts aloof, but he is actually a bookworm who loves himself. He plays as the green ranger in the Hero Club.
Nanako Watase (渡瀬 菜々子, Watase Nakano)
Voiced by: Sayaka Senbongi
A class representative at class 1-C. She is a kind girl who approach Mizuki who was lonely.
Takumi Sekiya (関谷 拓海, Sekiya Takumi)
Voiced by: Taku Yashiro
Third year student, who confessed to Nanako but got rejected.
Sora (空良, Sora)
Voiced by: Mina Katahira
A female 2D character who appears in "ILive!". Tomoki allegedly "bride".
Ossan (おっさん, Ossan)
Voiced by: Kenjiro Tsuda
An elderly man from the amusement park staff team, and a guard in Minakami High School training camp.
Faust (ファウスト, Fausuto)
Voiced by: Akira Ishida
A blue parakeet pet of Kazuhiro, often repeats Kazuhiro's chuunibyou lines.

== Media ==
=== Manga ===
Written by Minato Tonami and illustrated by Megumi Hazuki, Outburst Dreamer Boy has been serialized in Shueisha's Ribbon Special from July 15, 2017, to December 15, 2017.

| No. | Release date | ISBN |
|---|---|---|
| 1 | February 24, 2017 | 978-4-08-867450-6 |
| NEO | October 25, 2019 | 978-4-08-867569-5 |

| No. | Release date | ISBN |
|---|---|---|
| 1 | November 27, 2019 | 978-4-04-064142-3 |
| 2 | May 27, 2020 | 978-4-04-064626-8 |

=== Anime ===
An anime television series adaptation was announced on September 25, 2018. It aired on Tokyo MX from October 4, 2019, to December 13, 2019, every night at 10:30 p.m. The series is produced by Studio Deen, directed by Kazuya Ichikawa, written by Midori Gotou, and music composed by Satoshi Motoyama. The opening song is "Chuubyou Gekihatsu Boy" (厨病激発ボーイ) sang by the Minakami Hero Club, while the ending song is "Here comes The SUN" by Shugo Nakamura. Licensed by Sentai Filmworks in North America, and by Muse Communication in Southeast Asia.

| No. | Title | Directed by | Written by | Storyboarded by | Original release date |
|---|---|---|---|---|---|
| 1 | "That's Right, I Have Awakened"; Transliteration: "Sō sa ore wa mezamete shimatta" (そうさ 俺は目覚めてしまった) | Taro Kubo | Midori Gotou | Arisa Mutsuura | October 4, 2019 |
In Minakami Highschool while a new transferee student was introducing, both Yamato and Tomoki interrupts her introduction because of their chuunibyou. Mizuki sitting next to Yamato, she fails to make new friends. However, Nanako the class representative approach her, asking if something troubles her, Mizuki hesitate on asking Nanako to be her friend, so Nanako recommends a club that help out people. When Mizuki arrives at the club she was greeted by the Hero Club's chuunibyou with Yamato into superheroes, Kazuhiro believing he has a god in his arm, and Tomoki with his obsession with 2D-characters. Kazuhiro asking on why she was there she said that she just wanted help making new friends, Yamato propose something extraordinary being tired of their craziness Mizuki decides to go back to her class. The next day, a stray soccer ball almost hits Mizuki thankfully Yamato hits the ball saving her, accident similarly repeated two more times. Yamato concluding that Mizuki was being targeted, Yamato calls the rest of the Hero Club for a meeting. During a sport event outside paper airplanes with embarrassing notes started flying over, Mizuki head to the rooftop saying that they should just left her alone. Back in the field, a gust of wind tips over the basketball ring thankfully Yamato save her once again. Kazuhiro then reveals that the one targeting her is Rei.
| 2 | "Perhaps the Reincarnation of an Angel or a Devil"; Transliteration: "Tenshi ka akuma no umarekawari ka" (天使か悪魔の生まれ変わりか) | Masahiko Watanabe | Midori Gotou | Erina Seki | October 11, 2019 |
Rei points out that the culprit is Sekiya, the Hero Club figures why he did it, Nanako later explain that she was asked by Sekiya which she still have not responded to. While figuring out on how to solve it, they realizes that Sekiya was lurking so they decided to go to Kazuhiro's house. Tomoki figures out an idea on how to solve it by making Nanako have a fake boyfriend, which Nanako decided on Kazuhiro to be her fake boyfriend. On a rainy day, at a mall, Nanako stated that she already have a boyfriend, in which Kazuhiro appears soaking in rain outside the mall. Nanako asks Kazuhiro on buying new clothes. At a café Kazuhiro says that Sekiya should give up his love to Nanako, due to Kazuhiro exhausting over-explanation Sekiya decided to go to a restroom which there he met Rei. After returning Sekiya points out that Nanako and Kazuhiro never interacted with each others since the opening ceremony. However, with the acting of Kazuhiro and Nanako, Sekiya decides to leave his love for Nanako. Returning to the Hero Club Nanako befriends Mizuki, and Yamato gives Mizuki a "Hero Ticket" which rules that the Hero Club will help out even in all situations.
| 3 | "Neither a Kid or an Adult"; Transliteration: "Kodomo janaishi otona demonai" (子供じゃないし大人でもない) | Shunji Yoshida | Hana Yamada | Miyuki Kaieda | October 18, 2019 |
Insert Summary Here
| 4 | "I've Got a Complication, There's a Fanfare in My Head"; Transliteration: "Kojirase chatte panpakapappappān"" (こじらせちゃってパンパカパッパッパーン) | Masahiko Watanabe | Midori Gotou | Asuka Nakanishi | October 25, 2019 |
Insert Summary Here
| 5 | "I'm Burdened with Great power" Transliteration: "Kyōdaina Chikara motte shimatta" (強大なチカラ 持ってしまった) | Satou Mitsutoshi | Hana Yamada | Akane Shimizu | November 1, 2019 |
Insert Summary Here
| 6 | "I Sense Someone Glancing This Way"; Transliteration: "Chirachira shisen kanji teru" (チラチラ視線感じてる) | Naoki Murata | Midori Gotou | Miyuki Kaieda | November 8, 2019 |
Insert Summary Here
| 7 | "I'm Not Pretty Boy and It's a One Night Stand"; Transliteration: "Ikemen janaishi one night love" (イケメンじゃないしone night love) | Shunji Yoshida | Midori Gotou | Erina Seki | November 15, 2019 |
Insert Summary Here
| 8 | "Swaying in the Gap Between Ideals and Reality"; Transliteration: "Risō to genjitsu no hazama de yure teru" (理想と現実の狭間で揺れてる) | Masahiko Watanabe | Koyuri Oba | Akane Shimizu | November 22, 2019 |
Insert Summary Here
| 9 | "The Number You're Trying to Reach"; Transliteration: "Okake ni natta denwa ha" (おかけになった電話は) | Naoki Murata | Koyuri Oba | Miyuki Kaieda | November 29, 2019 |
Insert Summary Here
| 10 | "Mingled in the Darkness of Solitude and Twisted Logic"; Transliteration: "Kodoku to herikutsu no yaminimagirete" (孤独と屁理屈の闇に紛れて) | Masahiko Watanabe | Midori Gotou | Kanako Yajima, Asuka Nakanishi | December 6, 2019 |
Insert Summary Here
| 11 | "Go Forth and Iluminate, Searchlight!"; Transliteration: "Hanate ore no sāchiraito!"" (放て俺のサーチライト！) | Satou Mitsutoshi | Midori Gotou | Arisa Matsuura | December 13, 2019 |
Insert Summary Here
| OVA | "It was My Fate Having Been Born as a Man"; Transliteration: "Otoko ni uma reta shukumeidakara" (男に生まれた宿命だから) | Kazuya Ichikawa | Midori Gotou | TBA | March 25, 2020 |
Insert Summary Here
