= Killed Again, Mr. Detective? =

Japanese light novel series

- First light novel volume cover

また殺されてしまったのですね、探偵様 (Mata Korosarete Shimatta no desu ne, Tantei-sama)
- Genre: Mystery
- Light novel
- Written by: Teniwoha
- Illustrated by: Riichu
- Published by: Media Factory
- Imprint: MF Bunko J
- Original run: August 25, 2021 – present
- Volumes: 7
- Manga
- Written by: Teniwoha
- Illustrated by: Inaba
- Published by: Fujimi Shobo
- English publisher: NA: Yen Press
- Imprint: Dragon Comics Age
- Magazine: Dra Dra Flat
- Original run: July 7, 2022 – March 7, 2024
- Volumes: 2
- Anime television series
- Directed by: Takashi Naoya
- Written by: Mio Inoue
- Music by: Shūhei Mutsuki
- Studio: Liden Films
- Licensed by: Crunchyroll
- Original network: TBS, BS11
- Original run: April 3, 2026 – June 18, 2026
- Episodes: 12
- icon

Killed Again, Mr. Detective? (Japanese: また殺されてしまったのですね、探偵様, Hepburn: Mata Korosarete Shimatta no desu ne, Tantei-sama) is a Japanese light novel series written by Teniwoha and illustrated by Riichu. It began publication under Media Factory's MF Bunko J imprint in August 2021, with seven volumes published as of July 2026. A manga adaptation illustrated by Inaba was serialized from July 2022 to March 2024, with its chapters collected into two volumes between March 2023 and March 2024. An anime television series adaptation produced by Liden Films aired from April to June 2026.

== Plot ==
The series follows Sakuya Outsuki, a high school student who works as a detective, aided by his assistant Lilithea. Sakuya has the ability to come back to life after being killed. The series covers Sakuya using his ability and detective skills to solve cases with the help of Lilithea, and their growing relationship.

== Characters ==
Sakuya Outsuki (追月 朔也, Ōtsuki Sakuya)
Voiced by: Ryōta Ōsaka (PV), Rikuya Yasuda (anime)
A high school student who works as a detective. He is the son of Tatsuya Outsuki, a renowned detective known for solving even the most difficult cases. Like his father, he has the ability to bring himself back to life after being killed. Unlike his father, who is known for being involved in high-stakes investigations, Sakuya prefers more mundane cases. He cares about Lilithea, though he's not fully aware of her feelings.
Lilithea (リリテア, Riritea)
Voiced by: Ikumi Hasegawa (PV), Shion Wakayama (anime)
A 16-year-old girl who serves as Sakuya's assistant, helping him with cases. She's a very beautiful girl with a nice figure, silver hair, and purple eyes. She's quite observant and capable at her job, yet tends to give into temptations to have fun while on the job. She cares deeply for Sakuya, and is quite possessive of him, getting jealous when he interacts with other women.
Yuriu Haigamine (灰ヶ峰 ゆりう, Haigamine Yuriu)
Voiced by: Yoshino Aoyama
Kaoruta Sozorogi (漫呂木 薫太, Sozorogi Kaoruta)
Voiced by: Katsuyuki Konishi
Chardina Infelicius (シャルディナ・インフェリシャス, Sharudina inferishasu)
Voiced by: Rie Kugimiya
Belka Zeppelin (ベルカ・ゼッペリン, Beruka Zepperin)
Voiced by: Yūki Takada
Fido (フィド)
Voiced by: Yūki Takada

== Media ==
=== Light novel ===
Written by Teniwoha and illustrated by Riichu, Killed Again, Mr. Detective? is published by Media Factory under their MF Bunko J imprint, with the first volume being released on August 25, 2021. Seven volumes have been released as of July 24, 2026.

No.	Release date	ISBN
1	August 25, 2021	978-4-04-680699-4
2	February 25, 2022	978-4-04-681183-7
3	May 25, 2022	978-4-04-681411-1
4	October 25, 2022	978-4-04-681750-1
5	March 25, 2024	978-4-04-682447-9
6	November 25, 2025	978-4-04-685444-5
7	July 24, 2026	978-4-04-660215-2

=== Manga ===
A manga adaptation illustrated by Inaba was serialized on the Niconico and ComicWalker websites under Fujimi Shobo's Dra Dra Flat brand from July 7, 2022, to March 7, 2024. Its chapters were collected into two tankōbon volumes between March 9, 2023, and March 8, 2024. The manga is licensed in English by Yen Press.

No.	Original release date	Original ISBN	English release date	English ISBN
1	March 9, 2023	978-4-04-074831-3	August 26, 2025	979-8-8554-1172-0
2	March 8, 2024	978-4-04-075247-1	January 20, 2026	979-8-8554-1174-4

=== Anime ===
An anime television series adaptation was announced during MF Bunko J's "Fall School Festival 2025" livestream event on November 16, 2025. It is produced by Liden Films and directed by Takashi Naoya, with scripts written by Mio Inoue, characters designed by Akiko Kumada, and music composed by Shūhei Mutsuki. The series aired from April 3 to June 19, 2026, on TBS and BS11. The opening theme song is "Stardust Eureka" (スターダスト・エウレカ), performed by Multidimensional Control Mechanism Yodaka, while the ending theme song is "Lilithea no Uta" (リリテアの歌; Lilithea's Song), performed by Shion Wakayama. Crunchyroll is streaming the series.

==== Episodes ====
No.	Title	Directed by (Note: Production staff information is taken from the ending credits of each episode.)	Written by	Storyboarded by	Original release date (Note: TBS listed the series premiere on April 2 at 25:58, which is effectively April 3 at 1:58 a.m. JST.)
1	"The Queen Irie Murder Case, Part 1"; Transliteration: "Kuīn・Airī-gō Satsujin Jiken・Zenpen" (Japanese: クイーン・アイリィ号殺人事件・前編)	Takashi Naoya	Mio Inoue	Takashi Naoya	April 3, 2026
High schooler Sakuya Outsuki works as a private detective with his assistant Lilithea. His famous father, detective Tatsuya, is often absent on high profile investigations whereas Sakuya only takes simple cases, such as his current one involving a cheating husband named Katsuragi. Sakuya and Lilithea follow Katsuragi onto cruise ship Queen Irie, where as a film director he is interviewing actress Haigamine. Sakuya is surprised police detective Sozorogi is also onboard. Unexpectedly, Sakuya encounters Haigamine when she falls through the ceiling of the men's bathroom, having been searching for Katsuragi's missing cat Lulu. She asks Sakuya's help finding Lulu and he agrees, hoping it will help him get close to Katsuragi. As her first major film role is a detective Haigamine asks Sakuya's help preparing for the role. Searching for Lulu in the cargo hold Sakuya finds the dead body of a man Katsuragi had spoken with earlier. While searching the man's phone Sakuya is stabbed by someone dressed as a clown, who leaves with the phone. Having bled to death Sakuya suddenly comes back to life in Lilithea's arms, who scolds him for getting himself killed again.
2	"The Queen Irie Murder Case, Part 2"; Transliteration: "Kuīn・Airī-gō Satsujin Jiken・Kōhen" (Japanese: クイーン・アイリィ号殺人事件・後編)	Ryūta Yamamoto	Mio Inoue	Takashi Naoya	April 10, 2026 (Note: Due to the broadcast of the 2026 Masters Tournament, this episode aired at 3:27 a.m. JST, 1 hour and 29 minutes after the original air time on TBS.)
It is revealed through unknown mean Sakuya always comes back to life, as does his father Tatsuya. Lilithea reveals the other dead man is Nejihiko, and his family believe Sakuya and Nejihiko killed each other. To keep his ability hidden Lilithea claims she revived Sakuya with CPR. To clear his name Sakuya meets Sozorogi and Nejihiko's family; rich father Kashihiko, mother Wako, brother Amahiko and young niece Miko, who are convinced by the evidence Sakuya did not murder Nejihiko. Haigamine calls Sakuya with news she found Lulu, who has a camera on her collar. Realising the camera recorded Najihiko's murder, Sakuya saves Haigamine from the clown. Lilithea apprehends the clown, who turns out to be Wako. Lulu's collar reveals Nejihiko found evidence Kashihiko was selling drugs through the family sweet factory and planned to tell the police, so Wako killed him. Sakuya declares both his cases solved, since he also discovered Katsuragi was not having an affair, but was spending sums of money trying to make Lulu famous on social media, which he kept hidden from his wife. A passenger plane suddenly crashes into the ship, which Sakuya recognises as a plane that had been hijacked, a plane his father Tatsuya was on. Sakuya races into the flames where a sinister figure suggests Tatsuya is gone and won't be coming back to life.
3	"Murder at the Crimson Theater"; Transliteration: "Kurimuzon・Shiatā no Satsujin" (Japanese: クリムゾン・シアターの殺人)	Tatsuya Shiraishi	Mio Inoue	Tatsuya Shiraishi	April 17, 2026
Sakuya is invited to Haigamine's movie at the Crimson Theatre. Sozorogi asks Sakuya not to interfere in the plane crash investigation, but Sakuya already knows it was caused by Seven Old Men, the most notorious criminals Tatsuya ever caught. During the movie, Sakuya is injected with poison. After he resurrects Sakuya quietly confronts a man named Natsume of attacking him by mistake, because Sakuya was sat in the seat reserved for director Toriho Hiichi. Natsume admits he wants the film cancelled because in one scene's background he was accidentally filmed on a date with Yanai Yuuka, an actress, and if their relationship is exposed her career is over. Sakuya offers to have Yuuka credited as a guest star, so her appearance won't seem suspicious. After Natsume leaves Sakuya is shocked to encounter Chardina Infelicious, one of the Seven Old Men known as "Celebrity" for her limitless wealth. While she doesn't admit to being involved with Tatsuya's death, she is glad he is gone. Despite the police waiting for her, Chardina reveals she has purchased every street between the theatre and airport, so without a warrant the police can't enter her private property to arrest her. Before leaving, she warns Sakuya to beware of Y Derringer a.k.a "Empress", and then blows up the police cars.
4	"The Kowloon Hotel Murder, Part 1"; Transliteration: "Kūronzu・Hoteru no Satsujin Oni・Zenpen" (Japanese: クーロンズ・ホテルの殺人鬼・前編)	Mikuni Samoto	Misaki Morie	Namako Umino	April 24, 2026
Sakuya and Lilithea spend the night at Kowloon Hotel, courtesy of a woman Sakuya knows from a previous case, Iriya, a relative of the owner. Haigamine is also present as her movie's sequel is being filmed at Kowloon. Sozorogi reveals a threatening letter was sent to Toriho by someone called Dog's Head Bellboy. Chou, the Kowloon's owner, demands they never talk about Bellboy. Shirasagi, a stuntman for the film, has dreams of being a director. Haigamine's agent, Nakuji, resents Sakuya being involved. Sakuya notices a calligraphy of the Iron Law behind the front desk, from when the Kowloon was operated by a criminal syndicate. The law warns traitors will be eaten by dragons, those who interfere will be burned by a Phoenix, the greedy shall drown and the impudent be clawed by tigers. Manga author Kanashino reveals 20 years ago a man who betrayed the Syndicate was murdered at Kowloon along with his family, though the murderer was arrested. After that, four guardian deity statues were placed around Kowloon to ward off evil. Sakuya spots Bellboy with a severed head in a bag. Bellboy stabs Sakuya for "disgracing the Celestial Maiden". Sakuya resurrects and learns the head was Nakuji, and after Sakuya died Bellboy stuffed the head into the mouth of the dragon guardian deity.
5	"The Kowloon Hotel Murder, Part 2"; Transliteration: "Kūronzu・Hoteru no Satsujin Oni・Kōhen" (Japanese: クーロンズ・ホテルの殺人鬼・後編)	Daiki Handa	Misaki Morie	Daiki Handa	May 1, 2026
Sakuya notices his body feels strange. Lilithea reports Sakuya was the Phoenix murder as he was found on fire in Nakuji's room. Sakuya realises Bellboy switched his head with Nakuji's to make posing their bodies easier, meaning Sakuya's head has resurrected on Nakuji's body. Sakuya suspects he wasn't Bellboy's intended victim, meaning Bellboy improvised when Sakuya surprised him. After returning his head to his own body, Sakuya asks Chou about the original Bellboy. Chou reveals one son survived while Bellboy was caught and found to be a serial killer, not a syndicate assassin. Sozorogi discovers Toriho filming a fall from Kowloon's roof into the lake by Shirasagi. Sakuya realises this could be the drowning murder and accuses Shirasagi, revealing while being attacked he scratched his name onto Bellboy's back to identify him later. Shirasagi attacks, insisting only he has the vision to direct the film. Chou realises Shirasagi is the surviving son. Lilithea knocks Shirasagi unconscious and Sozorogi proves he was stalking Haigamine, the Celestial Maiden. Lilithea asks Sakuya to quit being a detective, but he refuses for his father's memory. Sozorogi keeps from Sakuya that there were other murders not committed by Shirasagi. Elsewhere, Haigamine is revealed to actually be Yurrieux "Y" Derringer, having met Sakuya on purpose to see if he had potential.
6	"The Man-Eating Ferris Wheel Park, Part 1"; Transliteration: "Hito-gui Kanran-sha no En・Kōhen" (Japanese: 人食い観覧車の園・前編)	Ryūta Yamamoto	Takashi Naoya	Keisuke Ōnishi	May 8, 2026
Haigamine avoids the authorities as Y in Venice. Sakuya is hired to find an engagement ring lost in Mizushimaen amusement park. On the train there Sakuya sees a man acting strangely. Sakuya reveals he asked another detective named Fido, from the UK, to help him find Y. Outside Mizushimaen Sakuya is hit by a car but survives with a broken leg. He is treated by Dr Warauji and his assistant Yaotome. Lilithea calls Sakuya to inform him TreChes suddenly stopped moving, and everyone riding it at the time died of stab wounds. Sakuya tries to return to Lilithea, but is hit on the head by someone using a plaster cast over their broken arm as a weapon. Lilithea retrieves Sakuya from the hospital morgue and informs him his cause of death was listed as a brain haemorrhage caused by the car accident. Lilithea reveals the 16 victims were somehow stabbed to death in 15 separate compartments 100 feet in the air. They are joined by Fido, actually a Beagle dog and world-famous canine detective, along with Belka Zeppelin, Fido's human assistant who translates his barking into human speech. A park employee shares a rumour TreChes is so haunted no one ever rides it, so having 16 riders on it at the same time almost never happens.
7	"The Man-Eating Ferris Wheel Park, Part 2"; Transliteration: "Hito-gui Kanran-sha no En・Zenpen" (Japanese: 人食い観覧車の園・後編)	Nao Miyoshi	Takashi Naoya	Jun'ichi Sakata	May 15, 2026
Sakuya realises one victim was the man from the train. He also notes despite all being stabbed two married victims died of poison and several victims have scars from past suicide attempts. Sakuya realises all 16 victims committed suicide but staged it as stabbings, disposing of their knives out their compartment windows into the river below the ferris wheel. Sozorogi confirms all victims were recently paid millions, which will now be inherited by their families. Sozorogi also confirms the victims were patients of Dr Warauji. Sakuya accuses Dr Warauji's assistant Yaotome, who is so terrified at seeing Sakuya alive he confesses to murdering Sakuya and arranging the fake murders of 16 already suicidal patients. He explains for decades Mizushimaen had a beautiful Sun Ferris Wheel that was the last thing many terminally ill patients saw from their windows before dying, but then Mizushimaen replaced Sun with the ugly TreChes wheel, so he planned a supernatural mass-murder hoping TreChes would be demolished. With the case solved Sakuya and Lilithea find the lost ring on TreChes. Later, Chardina calls Sakuya and confesses she provided the money Yaotome bribed the victims with. She then insists if Sakuya wants to know about his father he should visit Reginleiv, her private Mediterranean island.
8	"Murder on Gallery Island, Part 1"; Transliteration: "Garōshima no Satsujin・Kōhen" (Japanese: 画廊島の殺人・前編)	Mikuni Samoto	Misaki Morie	Mikuni Samoto	May 22, 2026
Sakuya, Lilithea, Fido, Belka and Haigamine take Fido's boat to Reginleiv in the Tyrrhenian Sea. Due to a leak, they land on Acquario Island for repairs and shelter in a nearby mansion. They encounter Herbie, a landscape photographer. Sakuya notes the mansion wall facing the ocean is covered with iron spears, and the main hall has a painting of a Siren. Maid Ursuna drops a piece of coloured paper she claims is a decoration for her mistress's birthday. They meet the mistress' relatives; Ivan, a retired trader, his son Lyle, Lyle's wife Katya and son Dimitry. Over dinner they meet the mistress, Lucciola de Sica, who uses a wheelchair. Fido deduces Lucciola has Sirenomelia, aka Mermaid Syndrome. Ursuna explains the mansion used to be a quarantine facility, and due to the number of drownings nearby sailors believed a Siren was responsible. The spears were added to keep the Siren away. Lilithea realises Lucciola's grandfather was the artist Eliseo. Lucciola reveals the Siren painting was Cireitz the Azure Swimmer, and Eliseo had promised to give it to anyone who learned it's true value. Herbie disappears, leaving a note that he left the island. Ursuna confirms Lucciola's boat is missing. However, they locate Herbie impaled on one of the spears, just as they hear the Siren start singing.
9	"Murder on Gallery Island, Part 2"; Transliteration: "Garōshima no Satsujin・Zenpen" (Japanese: 画廊島の殺人・後編)	Kaho Asai	Misaki Morie	Masao Suzuki	May 29, 2026
Lucciola collapses and claims the siren attacked her. Sakuya accuses her of lying as she is wet, meaning while everyone was looking for Herbie Lucciola was somehow outside in the rain. Sakuya accuses her of being able to walk, which Lilithea confirms with Herbie's pictures of Lucciola running. Lucciola admits Eliseo got her surgery to replace her crippled legs with prosthetics, which she hid from Ursuna. Lucciola flees, but Fido tracks her to a sea cave where they find an albino killer-whale named Graffio. Lucciola reveals she found Graffio injured by a fisherman's harpoon and nursed her back to health. When Herbie saw Graffio he wanted to put pictures of her in a magazine and become famous. When Herbie hit Lucciola, Graffio flipped him out of the water where he hit the spears. To protect Graffio Lucciola staged everything to appear like Herbie left by himself. Lyle claims that technically no crime has been committed as Herbie died of his own stupidity. Chardina suddenly surfaces in her submarine, having decided to steal Eliseo's infamous first painting, which the public does not know exists. Katya suddenly reveals the siren killed Dimitry. Uninterested, Chardina gives Sakuya 10 hours to solve Dimitry's murder or she will fire a missile at the island, killing everyone including herself.
10	"The Serial Killings on Gallery Island, Part 1"; Transliteration: "Garōshima no Renzoku Satsujin・Kōhen" (Japanese: 画廊島の連続殺人・前編)	Mikuni Samoto	Mio Inoue	Mikuni Samoto	June 5, 2026
In Dimitry's room Sakuya finds blood, a broken window, keys to the mansion and "SIREN" written in blood. From the keys Sakuya theorises Dimitry was searching the west wing. Sakuya wonders if Chardina might be involved, causing a fight between Lilithea and Chardina's subordinates Altra and Carmina. As Dimitry's bedsheets are missing Fido demonstrates that if someone used them like a parachute the wind would have pulled Dimitry's body through the window out to sea. Sakuya discovers the pieces of coloured paper are actually flower petals from the roof-garden of the east wing, while the soil on the west wing roof-garden has been disturbed. Ursuna reveals the flowers are Apollonia, planted by Eliseo. Katya suddenly claims the killer is Eliseo's ghost. Ivan calls from the phone in room 303, scared of someone called Yuri, and is murdered. Everyone rushes to the room and finds a broken window and a cassette player playing the song Rondo for the Siren. Chardina demands access to Eliseo's workshop, intending to find the painting and offer Lucciola a fair price for it, but Ursuna refuses. Chardina realises Ursuna once represented Spain in the Long Jump event. Chardina reveals the person who killed Tatsuya wanted him out of the way so they could involve Sakuya and his immortality in a worldwide conspiracy.
11	"The Serial Killings on Gallery Island, Part 2"; Transliteration: "Garōshima no Renzoku Satsujin・Zenpen" (Japanese: 画廊島の連続殺人・後編)	Shinsuke Terasawa	Mio Inoue	Daiki Handa	June 12, 2026
Chardina and Sakuya find Eliseo's diary. 50 years ago, Eliseo was a scientist and with partners Boris, Isaac and Irina, invented the drug Cireitz to achieve immortality. Irina tested Cireitz on herself but her body began to wither. She soon gave birth to Eliseo's child but died afterwards. Boris and Isaac considered the baby, Apollonia, research material. Eliseo fled with her and the Irina Report to protect Apollonia. Sakuya deduces Lyle is an assassin. Lyle breaks Sakuya's neck and steals the report. Sakuya resurrects and finds Lyle poisoned and the Report missing. Fido deduces Ivan was actually killed in room 111, but the killer disguised the room so Ivan thought he was in room 303. As the rooms are in separate wings, everyone suspects former long-jumper Ursuna jumped from one roof to the other. Ursuna denies this, revealing old injuries mean she cannot jump. Sakuya claims Lyle survived, causing Katya to accidentally reveal herself as his killer. Sakuya confirms the whole family are assassins looking for the Report. When Lyle found the Report Katya killed him for it. Ivan and Boris' killer however, is Lucciola, whose sports prosthetics made it possible to long jump. She reveals her mother Apollonia could not handle Lucciola's disability, so she jumped into the sea with her husband, for which Eliseo and Lucciola blamed Boris and Isaac. Katya reveals Ivan was Isaac, and Dimitry was Boris, Katya's father, who stayed young with other drugs. Sakuya's time limit expires and Chardina's missiles strike the mansion.
12	"The Destruction of Gallery Island"; Transliteration: "Garōshima no Hōkai" (Japanese: 画廊島の崩壊)	Nao Miyoshi	Teniwoha	Nao Miyoshi	June 19, 2026
The floor collapses and everyone drops into Graffio's cave. Sakuya dies from the fall but revives straight away. Katya spots the Report nearby and shoots Lucciola. Graffio appears and is shot but manages to drown Katya. The Report falls into deeper water and is lost. Dying, Lucciola sinks into the ocean with Graffio. Everyone decides to leave the island, except Ursuna who stays to talk to police. Ursuna admits to Sakuya Lucciola was born from Apollonia's second marriage, while she was born from her first marriage, making her Lucciola's older half-sister. When Eliseo died, she got a job as Lucciola's maid but never told her they were sisters. Sakuya and Lilithea both worry this time Sakuya resurrected in seconds, much faster than normal. Sakuya hears Graffio singing, but chooses to believe Lucciola became a Siren. Sozorogi is allowed to interview Felicette, an Artificial Intelligence android; one of the Seven Old Men. In prison and cut off from the internet, she informs Sozorogi Sakuya's father Tatsuya is still alive. She then seizes control of the prison network, trapping Sozorogi inside with her, and demands to speak to Sakuya. Meanwhile, investigating a Billionaire for tax evasion, Sakuya becomes mixed up with a serial bomber and accidentally blows up himself and the Billionaires art collection. Lilithea merely comments "Killed again, Mr Detective?"

== Reception ==
Rebecca Silverman, writing for Anime News Network, reviewed the first volume of the manga. She praised how the manga completed the murder case within a single volume, as well as Sakuya's characterization. However, she questioned Lilithea's characterization, describing her as too robotic and quirky rather than being fleshed out more. She also criticized the supporting character Yuriu as slowing down the pacing. She concluded by saying that while the volume was fun to follow, it was not a must-buy.

== See also ==
- The Vexations of a Shut-In Vampire Princess, another light novel series illustrated by Riichu
