= Beyblade Burst Evolution =

- Season 2
- No. of episodes: 51

Release
- Original network: TXN (TV Tokyo, TV Osaka)
- Original release: April 3, 2017 – March 26, 2018

Season chronology
- ← Previous; Burst Next → Burst Turbo

Beyblade Burst Evolution, known in Japan as Beyblade Burst God (ベイブレードバースト神, Beiburēdo Bāsuto Kami (Goddo)), is a 2017 anime series and the second season of Beyblade Burst. The series was produced by D-rights and TV Tokyo and animated by OLM, and it premiered on all TXN stations in Japan on April 3, 2017. An English dub of the anime premiered on Teletoon in Canada on November 4, 2017 and on Disney XD in the United States on December 4, 2017. The opening theme is "Evolution Burst!" The ending themes are "BeyXercise" for the first 26 episodes and "Beyxercise 2" for the remainder of the series.

== Episode list ==
No. overall	No. in season	Japanese Translated title/English title	Original release date	English air date
52	1	"To the World! Valkyrie's Evolution!!" / Fresh Start! Valtryek's Evolution! Transliteration: "Sekai e! Varukirī Shinka!!" (Japanese: 世界へ!ヴァルキリー進化!!)	April 3, 2017	November 4, 2017 (Canada); December 4, 2017 (United States)
After being runner-up in the Japan National Tournament and being scouted by the world-renowned Beyblade team BC Sol, Valt Aoi arrives in Spain, where he meets a boy named Kit Lopez. As the boy takes his bey Victory Valtryek, Valt rushes to retrieve him and finds Silas Karlisle where he battles and after a terrific battle Valtryek gets damage and is modified by Raul Comas in a van and Valt finally finds his way to BC Sol and starts his journey with his newly evolved bey, Genesis Valtryek.
53	2	"Manly Spirit! Blaze Ragnarok!!" / Fighting Spirit! Berserk Roktavor! Transliteration: "Otoko Tamashi! Bureizu Ragunaruku!!" (Japanese: 男魂!ブレイズラグナルク!!)	April 10, 2017	November 5, 2017 (Canada); December 5, 2017 (United States)
After missing his first day at BC Sol, Valt must beat the fierce competition to earn his spot on the team. At tryouts, he reunites with a buddy from back home, Rontaro Kiyama.
54	3	"Shock! Drain Fafnir!!" / Drain Fafnir! Winding Up! Transliteration: "Shōgeki! Dorein Fabuniru!!" (Japanese: 衝撃!ドレインファブニル!!)	April 17, 2017	November 11, 2017 (Canada); December 6, 2017 (United States)
With a match against Sunbat United coming up, BC Sol hosts internal tryouts to select their squad. Those who want a chance to represent the club must challenge BC Sol captain Free De La Hoya.
55	4	"Whirlwind! Tornado Wyvern!!" / Whirlwind! Tempest Wyvron! Transliteration: "Senpū! Torunēdo Waibān!!" (Japanese: 旋風!トルネードワイバーン!!)	April 24, 2017	November 12, 2017 (Canada); December 7, 2017 (United States)
Thousands of miles away from home, Valt and Rantaro get the chance to face off against a familiar face, Wakiya Murasaki. They're both excited to show off their Beys' new abilities, but Valtryek and Roktavor aren't the only ones to have evolved.
56	5	"Surprise Attack! Kinetic Satomb!" / Demonic Attack! Kreis Satan!! Transliteration: "Mashū! Kureis Satan!!" (Japanese: 魔襲!クライスサタン!!)	May 1, 2017	November 18, 2017 (Canada); December 8, 2017 (United States)
BC Sol and Sunbat United lock horns in a friendly match, but the action is anything but. Valt may have gone up against Silas before, but he's never seen him launch like this.
57	6	"Severe Earthquake! BC Sol!!" / Squad Shake Up! Transliteration: "Gekishin! BC Sol!!" (Japanese: 激震!BCソル!!)	May 8, 2017	November 19, 2017 (Canada); December 9, 2017 (United States)
Rantaro gets a second chance to take down his old rival Wakiya. Meanwhile, veteran BC Sol Bladers start to feel the squeeze when they notice how quickly Valt and Rantaro are rising through the ranks.
58	7	"Reach It! The Top Team!!" / Journey to the Top! Transliteration: "Tsukame! Toppu Chīmu!!" (Japanese: 掴め!トップチーム!!)	May 15, 2017	November 25, 2017 (Canada); December 11, 2017 (United States)
After a teammate's sudden departure, Valt finds himself in the middle of flaring tensions between new and old BC Sol members. Kristina Kuroda and Trad Vasquez hold tryouts to decide which Bladers will make it on the first strong.
59	8	"It Begins! The Europe League!!" / Season Opener! European League; Transliteration: "Kaimaku! Yōroppa Rīgu!!" (Japanese: 開幕!ヨーロッパリーグ!!)	May 22, 2017	November 26, 2017 (Canada); December 12, 2017 (United States)
The European League is well underway. Valt finds a new friend who is full of laughs and positive vibes, Cuza Ackerman, but when they're teams are forced to compete against one another, friendship quickly fades and becomes enemyship.
60	9	"Time God! Alter Chronos!!" / Alter Cognite! The Shape Shifter! Transliteration: "Tokigami! Arutā Kuronosu!!" (Japanese: 時神!アルタークロノス!!)	May 29, 2017	December 2, 2017 (Canada); December 13, 2017 (United States)
An old friend tunes in to the faceoff between BC Sol and Top Wand. Valt gets a second chance to challenge Cuza. Behind the scenes, a bold offer is put on the table that risks changing BC Sol forever.
61	10	"Valt and Free" / Free to Launch; Transliteration: "Baruto to Furī" (Japanese: バルトとフリー)	June 5, 2017	December 3, 2017 (Canada); December 14, 2017 (United States)
Valt and Rantaro celebrate their rising world rankings, but tension begins to brew within the club and somebody is moving out of the team, and is no other than Free.
62	11	"The Collapse of BC Sol!!" / BC Sol: A Team Divided; Transliteration: "Hōkai! BC Soru!!" (Japanese: 崩壊!BCソル!!)	June 12, 2017	December 9, 2017 (Canada); December 15, 2017 (United States)
After Free's moving, A revamp finds Valt and Rantaro moving up to BC Sol's first string. A missing key member results in a less than desirable losing streak. The team hopes to turn their luck around.
63	12	"Deathscyther's Rebirth!" / The Return of Doomscizor; Transliteration: "Desu Saizā Sairin!" (Japanese: 死神（デスサイザー）再臨!)	June 19, 2017	December 10, 2017 (Canada); December 16, 2017 (United States)
Former member of Beigoma Academy Beyclub and the current captain of the AS Gallus, Daigo Kurogami, is an old friend of Valt and Rantaro. Valt and Rantaro get a chance to check out Doomscizor's new skills prior to match. Unfortunately, their curiosity is misinterpreted by the management team at BC Sol.
64	13	"Twin Scythes! Double Strike!"; Transliteration: "Sōkama! Daburu Sutoraiku!!" (Japanese: 双鎌!ダブルストライク!!)	June 26, 2017	December 16, 2017 (Canada); January 13, 2018 (United States)
Friends now turn rivals as BC Sol comes up against AS Gallus in battle, in order to avoid elimination.
65	14	"Charge! Maximum Garuda!!" / Attack! Maximus Garuda! Transliteration: "Shūgeki! Makishimamu Garūda!!" (Japanese: 蹴撃!マキシマムガルーダ!!)	July 3, 2017	December 17, 2017 (Canada); January 20, 2018 (United States)
BC Sol moves on and must defeat an opponent with not just a powerful secret weapon, but an intense grudge against Silas, Ghasem Madal.
66	15	"The Bird God Blader, Ghasem!!" / Ghasem! The Airborne Blader! Transliteration: "Torigami Burēdā Gazemu!!" (Japanese: 鳥神闘士（ブレーダー）ガゼム!!)	July 10, 2017	December 23, 2017 (Canada); January 27, 2018 (United States)
The threat of Ghasem and Maximus Garuda continues; Valt finds Valtryek's hidden power.
67	16	"Finding Shu" / The Search For Shu; Transliteration: "Shū wo Sagase" (Japanese: シュウを探せ)	July 17, 2017	December 24, 2017 (Canada); February 3, 2018 (United States)
When Shu Kurenai disappears without a trace, Wakiya helps Valt and his friends track him down in Mexico; along the way, they meet an old friend Cuza.
68	17	"The Devil in the Snake Pit!!" / Shadow Magic! The Snake Pit!! Transliteration: "Makyō! Sunēku Pitto!!" (Japanese: 魔境!スネークピット!!)	July 24, 2017	February 10, 2018 (United States)
Valt and his friends must unravel the mysteries of the Snake Pit, including facing beys exactly like theirs!
69	18	"Into the Labyrinth! The Black Dungeon!!" / The Underground Maze! Transliteration: "Meikyū! Burakku Danjon!!" (Japanese: 迷宮!ブラックダンジョン!!)	July 31, 2017	February 17, 2018 (United States)
The fights against the Shadow Beys continue.
70	19	"Fire God! Red Eye!!" / Secret Fire! Red Eye!! Transliteration: "Enshin! Reddo Ai!!" (Japanese: 炎神!レッドアイ!!)	August 7, 2017	February 24, 2018 (United States)
Valt and his friends finally face off against Red Eye and Shu's newly evolved bey, Legend Spryzen.
71	20	"Explosion! BC Sol!!" / New Teammates! New Rivals! Transliteration: "Bakushin! BC Sol!!" (Japanese: 爆進!BCソル!!)	August 14, 2017	March 3, 2018 (United States)
BC Sol goes through some major transfer changes.
72	21	"Joshua VS Space Ninja!" / Joshua vs. the Space Ninjas! Transliteration: "Joshua VS Supēsu Ninja" (Japanese: ジョシュアVS宇宙（スペース）忍者)	August 21, 2017	March 10, 2018 (United States)
When a movie is shot near BC Sol, Valt and his friends are thrilled to be a part of it. But the best part is the main character is one of the Big Five, Joshua Burns.
73	22	"Blast Jinnius Calling a Storm!" / Blast Jinnius! Caller of Storms! Transliteration: "Arashi o Yobu Burasuto Jiniusu!" (Japanese: 嵐を呼ぶブラストジニウス!)	August 28, 2017	March 17, 2018 (United States)
The movie shoot continues; Wakiya challenges Joshua to a bey battle.
74	23	"A Challenge! The Infinity Beystadium!!" / Infinity Stadium! Raul's Challenge! Transliteration: "Chōsen! Mugen Beisutajiamu!!" (Japanese: 挑戦!無限ベイスタジアム!!)	September 4, 2017	March 24, 2018 (United States)
With Trad gone to América, BC Sol needs a new BeyTrainer. Luckily, Valt has a familiar face in mind, and is none other than Raul.
75	24	"Turmoil! The World League!!" / World League! Setting the Stage! Transliteration: "Gekidō! Wārudo Rīgu!!" (Japanese: 激動!ワールドリーグ!!)	September 11, 2017	March 31, 2018 (United States)
With the World League just around the corner, Valt and Joshua dig into the mystery hidden of Free.
76	25	"Showdown! Sieg Xcalibur!" / Showdown! Surge Xcalius! Transliteration: "Tōken! JĪgu Ekusukaribā!!" (Japanese: 闘剣!ジークエクスカリバー!!)	September 18, 2017	April 7, 2018 (United States)
After BC Sol's first round victory, Valt receives a letter from Xander Shakadera, about how he tries to get into SB Rios in Brazil by taking on the Hundred Blader Challenge with his newly evolved bey, Surge Xcalius.
77	26	"God Reboot!!" / Genesis Reboot! Transliteration: "Bakuretsu! Goddo Ribūto!!" (Japanese: 炸裂!ゴッドリブート!!)	September 25, 2017	April 14, 2018 (United States)
As the second round of the World League approaches, Valt tries to master his newest move; Genesis Reboot. the second round begins against a familiar foe, Ghasem.
78	27	"Tokyo Battle! Real VS Rios!!" / Worlds Collide! Home Turf! Transliteration: "Tōkyō Batoru! Rearu VS Riosu!!" (Japanese: 東京バトル!レアルVSリオス!!)	October 2, 2017	April 21, 2018 (United States)
Valt, along with numerous other friends and familiar faces return to Japan for the battle between Sunbat United and SB Rios.
79	28	"Vampire! Deep Chaos" / Vampire! Deep Caynox! Transliteration: "Kyūketsuki! Dīpu Kaosu!!" (Japanese: 吸血鬼!ディープカオス!!)	October 9, 2017	April 28, 2018 (United States)
On their way to Diago's match against BC Galleon, Cuza finds an old friend, one he is afraid of!
80	29	"Fortress! Shelter Regulus!" / The Fortress! Shelter Regulus! Transliteration: "Yōsai! Sherutā Regurusu!!" (Japanese: 要塞!シェルターレグルス!!)	October 16, 2017	May 5, 2018 (United States)
BC Sol travels to Brazil for the BeyCarnival and the semifinal against SB Rios. But when they accidentally ruin the parade, the Brazilians threaten to riot against them. To solve this, Ren Wu, one of the Big 5, challenges Valt, Rantaro, and Cuza to a 3 on 1 battle.
81	30	"Clash! Shoot to the Finals!!" / Collision Course! To the Finals! Transliteration: "Gekitotsu! Kesshō he no Shūto!!" (Japanese: 激突!決勝へのシュート!!)	October 23, 2017	May 12, 2018 (United States)
The World League semifinals continue, with BC Sol versus SB Rios and AS Gallus against the Raging Bulls.
82	31	"Collapse! The Big 5's Wall!!" / Big 5! Breaking Through! Transliteration: "Yabure! Biggu Faibu no Kabe!!" (Japanese: 破れ!ビッグ5の壁!!)	October 30, 2017	May 19, 2018 (United States)
83	32	"Unrivaled! Triple Impact!!" / Unrivaled! Triple Saber! Transliteration: "Tenka Musou! Toriparu Inpakuto!!" (Japanese: 天下無双!トリプルインパクト!!)	November 6, 2017	July 2, 2018 (United States)
Daigo faces Joshua Burns; Valt and Xander's battle heats up than ever.
84	33	"The Finals! BC Sol VS New York Bulls!" / The World League Final! Transliteration: "Kesshō! BC Soru VS NY Buruzu!!" (Japanese: 決勝!BCソル VS NYブルズ!!)	November 13, 2017	June 9, 2018 (Canada); July 9, 2018 (United States)
The finals of the World League between BC Sol and the Raging Bulls begins. Meanwhile, the Japan National Champion Lui Shirosagi has completed his training with his newly evolved bey, Nightmare Luinor.
85	34	"Full Power! Bound Attack!!" / Full Power! Spring Attack! Transliteration: "Zenryoku! Boundo Attaku!!" (Japanese: 全力!バウンドアタック!!)	November 20, 2017	June 10, 2018 (Canada); July 16, 2018 (United States)
BC Sol faces off against the Raging Bulls in the World League Finals. Lui appears to watch the World League Finals.
86	35	"Our Final Match!" / To the Podium! Transliteration: "Ore-tachi no Kesshōsen!" (Japanese: 俺たちの決勝戦!)	November 27, 2017	June 16, 2018 (Canada); July 23, 2018 (United States)
87	36	"Duel! Longinus VS Spriggan!" / Luinor VS Spryzen; Transliteration: "Kettō! Ronginusu VS Supurigan!" (Japanese: 決闘!ロンギヌスVSスプリガン!)	December 4, 2017	June 17, 2018 (Canada); July 30, 2018 (United States)
88	37	"Let's Go! The God Bladers Cup!!" / The Challenge of Champions! Transliteration: "Iku ze! Goddo Burēdāzu Kappu!!" (Japanese: いくぜっ!ゴッドブレーダーズカップ!!)	December 11, 2017	June 23, 2018 (Canada); August 6, 2018 (United States)
89	38	"Deadly Weapon! Spriggan Requiem!!" / Requiem Project! Spryzen Unleashed! Transliteration: "Kyōki! Supurigan Rekuiemu!!" (Japanese: 凶機!スプリガンレクイエム!!)	December 18, 2017	June 24, 2018 (Canada); August 13, 2018 (United States)
90	39	"The Underground Battle Emperor, Kurtz!" / Emperor of the Underground; Transliteration: "Chika Batoru Kōtei Kurutsu!" (Japanese: 地下バトル皇帝クルツ!)	December 25, 2017	June 30, 2018 (Canada); August 25, 2018 (United States)
91	40	"Tyrant! Beat Kukulcan!!" / Bow Down! Boom Khalzar! Transliteration: "Bōkun! Bīto Kukurukan!!" (Japanese: 暴君!ビートククルカン!!)	January 8, 2018	July 21, 2018 (Canada); September 1, 2018 (United States)
92	41	"Iron Hammer! Twin Nemesis!!" / Colossus Hammer! Twin Noctemis! Transliteration: "Tettsui! Tsuin Nemeshisu!!" (Japanese: 鉄槌!ツインネメシス!!)	January 15, 2018	July 22, 2018 (Canada); September 8, 2018 (United States)
Boa faces off against Shu. Norman battles Clio and Cuza.
93	42	"BC Sol's Fierce Battle!!" / BC Sol Scorcher! Transliteration: "Shiretsu! BC Soru no Tatakai!!" (Japanese: 熾烈!BCソルの闘い!!)	January 22, 2018	July 28, 2018 (Canada); September 15, 2018 (United States)
Silas and Xander meet in the stadium; Valtryek has finally approaches a new level of evolution. This championship is pitting rivals against rivals, foes against foes, and friends against friends. Silas studies up on a brand new technique for his hot-headed opponent. While Valt and Cuza prepare for a clash of the besties. BC Sol is ready for anything that comes their way.
94	43	"Climax! Rival Great Clash!!" / White Hot Rivals; Transliteration: "Hakunetsu! Raibaru Daigekitotsu!!" (Japanese: 白熱!ライバル大激突!!)	January 29, 2018	July 29, 2018 (Canada); September 22, 2018 (United States)
95	44	"Super Evolution! Strike God Valkyrie!!" / Epic Evolution! Strike Valtryek! Transliteration: "Choushinka! Sutoraiku Goddo Varukirii!!" (Japanese: 超進化!ストライクゴッドヴァルキリー!!)	February 5, 2018	August 4, 2018 (Canada); September 29, 2018 (United States)
Valt tackles the Snake Pit's Norman Tarver with his newly evolved bey, Strike Valtryek. The leaderboards aren't looking too great for BC Sol. It's going to take a huge boost of confidence to get these Bladers back to their A-game. With a high-ranking opponent for Cuza, a riveting new strategy for Silas, and a state-of-the-art upgrade for Valt, they may just have what it takes to push through.
96	45	"Spriggan the God of Destruction!" / Spryzen the Destroyer! Transliteration: "Hakaishin Supurigan!" (Japanese: 破壊神スプリガン!)	February 12, 2018	August 5, 2018 (Canada); October 6, 2018 (United States)
The winners are separated from the losers in the fourth round; Valt finally gets to battle Shu.
97	46	"Beyond the Limit! Free VS Lui!!" / No Limits! Free VS Lui!! Transliteration: "Chougenkai! Furī VS Lui!!" (Japanese: 超限界!フリーVSルイ!!)	February 19, 2018	August 11, 2018 (Canada); October 13, 2018 (United States)
After Valtryek's Reboot Performance Tip is destroyed by Shu's Spryzen Requiem, Kristina tells Valt a secret; Free pushes himself in an attempt to defeat Lui again.
98	47	"The Ultimate Battle!" / Full Force! Charging up! Transliteration: "Arutimetto Batoru!" (Japanese: アルテイメットバトル!)	February 26, 2018	August 12, 2018 (Canada); October 20, 2018 (United States)
The match between Free and Lui heats up; Valt must master Valtryek's new gear, Ultimate Reboot.
99	48	"The Decisive Battle of Friendship!!" / Teamwork! To the Semi-Finals; Transliteration: "Yūjou! Ketteisen he no Batoru!!" (Japanese: 友情!決定戦へのバトル!!)	March 5, 2018	September 8, 2018 (Canada); October 27, 2018 (United States)
Valt needs Cuza to beat Kurt in order to stay in the competition.
100	49	"Semi-finals! Battle of Destiny!!" / The Fierce Four; Transliteration: "Junkessho! Shukumei no Batoru!!" (Japanese: 準決勝!宿命のバトル!!)	March 12, 2018	September 9, 2018 (Canada); November 3, 2018 (United States)
Four Bladers compete in the semifinals of the International Blader's Cup.
101	50	"Enter the Final Battle!!" / Breaking Point! Bursting Through; Transliteration: "Totsunyuu! Saishuu Kessen!!" (Japanese: 突入!最終決戦!!)	March 19, 2018	September 22, 2018 (Canada); November 10, 2018 (United States)
Valt faces the former BC Sol captain Free in the semifinals. Soon enough, Wakiya brings Daigo, Ken Midori, and Valt's family to help him with his training as the finals to the International Blader's Cup between Valt and Shu get closer.
102	51	"Valt VS Shu!!" / A Champion is Crowned! Transliteration: "Baruto VS Shuu!!" (Japanese: バルトVSシユウ!!)	March 26, 2018	September 23, 2018 (Canada); November 17, 2018 (United States)
Valt continues his final battle against Shu in order to free him from Spryzen's control with the International Blader's Cup title and their friendship on the line.
