= Beyblade Burst Turbo =

- Season 3
- Key Visual
- No. of episodes: 51

Release
- Original network: TXN (TV Tokyo, TV Osaka)
- Original release: April 2, 2018 – March 25, 2019

Season chronology
- ← Previous; Burst Evolution Next → Burst Rise

Beyblade Burst Turbo, known in Japan as Beyblade Burst Super-Z (ベイブレードバースト超ゼツ, Beiburēdo Bāsuto Chō Zetsu) or Beyblade Burst Chozetsu, is a 2018 anime series and the third season of Beyblade Burst. The series was produced by D-rights and TV Tokyo and animated by OLM, and it premiered on TXN stations in South Korea on April 2, 2018. This was the final season of the Beyblade Burst anime series with involvement, as well as the last one to premiere An English dub of the anime premiered on Teletoon in Canada on October 7, 2018, and on Disney XD in the United States on December 15, 2018. The opening theme is "Chouzetsu Muteki Blader! (Transcendence Invincible Blader!)" by Ryosuke Sasaki while the ending is "BEY-POP" by Shun Kusakawa. For the international version the theme music is "Turbo"; an instrumental version is used for the credits.

== Episode list ==
No. overall	No. in season	Japanese Translated title/English title	Original release date	English air date
103	1	"This is a Super Z Bey!" / Time to go Turbo! Transliteration: "Kore ga Chōzetsu Bei da!!" (Japanese: これが超ゼツベイだ!!)	April 2, 2018	October 7, 2018 (Canada); December 15, 2018 (United States)
After two years as World Champion, Valt Aoi is ready to take Strike Valtryek to the next level; Turbo! On his journey, Valt meets Aiger Akabane. With no experience but a natural talent that rivals Valt's, Aiger creates his own Turbo Bey, Z Achilles. It looks like a new Blader is ready to take center stage!
104	2	"Achilles vs Forneus!!"; Transliteration: "Akiresu VS Foruneusu!!" (Japanese: アキレスVSフォルネウス!!)	April 9, 2018	October 14, 2018 (Canada); December 16, 2018 (United States)
Determined to grow stronger and battle Valt, Aiger transfers to Beigoma Academy. His sights are set on battling Valt's successor, Fubuki Sumiye. But after almost 100 consecutive wins, will Aiger have enough gas left in the tank to take on the Bey Club Captain?
105	3	"The Duel at Sunset!!"; Transliteration: "Yūhi no Kettō!" (Japanese: 夕陽の決斗!!)	April 16, 2018	October 21, 2018 (Canada); December 17, 2018 (United States)
The match between Aiger and Fubuki continues and ends in Fubuki's favor. Aiger learns he isn't the only Akabane sibling at Beigoma Academy when he finds out his little sister Naru Akabane is transferring too! Meanwhile, Ranjiro Kiyama, Rantaro's younger brother and captain of the Wild Bey Gang, decides to battle Aiger and test his skills for himself.
106	4	"It's Decided! Z Buster!" / Land It! Z Breaker! Transliteration: "Kimero! Zetto Basutā!" (Japanese: 決めろ!ゼットバスター!!)	April 23, 2018	October 28, 2018 (Canada); December 18, 2018 (United States)
Kurt Baratier battles Valt for the World Champion title but lose to him, and as word spreads about Aiger's strength, he gets another shot at Fubuki.
107	5	"Super Z Showdown! Valkyrie vs. Longinus!" / Turbo Match! Valtryek vs. Lúinor! Transliteration: "Chōzetsu Taiketsu! Varukirī VS Ronginusu!" (Japanese: 超ゼツ対決!ヴァルキリーVSロンギヌス!!)	April 30, 2018	November 4, 2018 (Canada); December 19, 2018 (United States)
Lui Shirosagi challenges and battles Valt for the World Champion title, but ends losing to him.
108	6	"Winter Tyrant! Battle Royale!" / Winter Knight! Battle Royale! Transliteration: "Shiroki Bokkun! Batoru Roiyaru!" (Japanese: 白き暴君!バトルロイヤル!!)	May 7, 2018	November 10, 2018 (Canada); December 20, 2018 (United States)
The Luinor Cup Champion will get chance to face Lui to be crowned All-Asia Champion. Lui challenges three stubborn Bladers to a one-on-three battle.
109	7	"Open! Longinus Cup!" / Curtains Rise! The Lúinor Cup! Transliteration: "Kaimaku! Ronginusu Kappu!" (Japanese: 開幕!ロンギヌスカップ!!)	May 14, 2018	November 11, 2018 (Canada); December 21, 2018 (United States)
After his second loss to Lui, Aiger decides to step up his training and creates something that takes everyone by surprise.
110	8	"Transformation! Hell Salamander!" / Transformation! Heat Salamander! Transliteration: "Hengen! Heru Saramandā!" (Japanese: 変幻!ヘルサラマンダー!!)	May 21, 2018	November 17, 2018 (Canada); December 22, 2018 (United States)
After witnessing the power of Fubuki's new Turbo Bey, Suoh turns to a mysterious family heirloom to create one of his own.
111	9	"Rage of The Blazing Tornado!" / Swirling Inferno! Transliteration: "Kaensenpū Gekiren!" (Japanese: 火炎旋風ゲキリン!)	May 28, 2018	November 18, 2018 (Canada); December 29, 2018 (United States)
In an unlucky draw, Toko is up against Suoh in his first battle of the tournament. Having recently seen Suoh's power for themselves, Aiger, Fubuki, and Cap'n train with Toko Aoi to prepare for his match.
112	10	"Achilles VS Ragnaruk!!" / Achilles vs. Roktavor! Transliteration: "Akiresu VS Ragnaruku!!" (Japanese: アキレスVSラグナルク!!)	June 4, 2018	November 24, 2018 (Canada); January 19, 2019 (United States)
Aiger and Ranjiro are against each other, and the winner advances to the semi-finals.
113	11	"Battle of Betrayal!"; Transliteration: "Uragiri no Batoru!" (Japanese: 裏切りの激闘(バトル)!)	June 11, 2018	November 25, 2018 (Canada); January 26, 2019 (United States)
The matchups of the semifinals are announced! Fubuki is forced to face an old friend, while Aiger has to face a new one. It's Fubuki the hard-worker against Suoh the genius.
114	12	"The Strong Armed Hercules!" / Bull's-eye! Archer Hercules! Transliteration: "Gōwan! Herakuresu!" (Japanese: 豪腕!ヘラクレス!!)	June 18, 2018	December 1, 2018 (Canada); February 2, 2019 (United States)
It's friend vs. friend, balance vs. stamina, Aiger vs. Hae-jin! While Aiger is excited to face off against his friend, Hae-jin is torn between Blading and archery. Meanwhile, Fubuki extends an olive branch to Suoh. Who will face off against Suoh in the finals!?
115	13	"Super Z Final Battle!" / Lúinor Cup! Final Battle! Transliteration: "Chōzetsu Kesshōsen!!" (Japanese: 超ゼツ決勝戦!!)	June 25, 2018	December 2, 2018 (Canada); February 9, 2019 (United States)
116	14	"Raging Dragon! Bloody Longinus!" / Raging Dragon! Brutal Lúinor! Transliteration: "Bōryū! Buraddi Ronginusu!" (Japanese: 暴竜!ブラッディロンギヌス!!)	July 2, 2018	December 9, 2018 (Canada); February 16, 2019 (United States)
117	15	"Defeat Lui!!" / Trial By Fire! Defeat Lui! Transliteration: "Rui o taose!" (Japanese: ルイを倒せ!!)	July 9, 2018	December 10, 2018 (Canada); February 23, 2019 (United States)
118	16	"Grand Voyage! Battleship Cruise!!" / Epic Voyage! Battleship Cruise! Transliteration: "Dai kōkai! Batorushippu Kurūzu!" (Japanese: 大航海!バトルシップクルーズ!!)	July 16, 2018	January 20, 2019 (Canada); March 2, 2019 (United States)
119	17	"The Hero and the Holy Sword!!" / Sword of The Legendary Hero! Transliteration: "Yūsha to Ekusukaribā!!" (Japanese: 勇者と聖剣（エクスカリバー）!!)	July 23, 2018	January 27, 2019 (Canada); March 9, 2019 (United States)
Another member of the Turbo 4 joins the fray: an apprentice of the one-and-only Xander Shakadera, Xavier.
120	18	"A Super Z Battle on a Ghost Ship!" / Ghost Ship! Adventure on The High Seas! Transliteration: "Yūrei-sen no Chōzetsu Batoru!" (Japanese: ユーレイ船の超ゼツバトル!)	July 30, 2018	February 3, 2019 (Canada); March 23, 2019 (United States)
An abandoned ship appears out of the mists. When everyone goes to investigate, they learn there's more to this ghost ship than meets the eye.
121	19	"Fierce Fighting! The Beyathlon!" / Super Rumble! Beyathlon! Transliteration: "Daigekitō! Beasuron!" (Japanese: 大激闘!ベイアスロン!!)	August 6, 2018	February 10, 2019 (Canada); March 30, 2019 (United States)
Just in time for a series of new challenges, the crew is joined by the strange Kyle, the masked Blader they met aboard the ghost ship. Xavier ups the competition and takes his rivalry with Aiger to the next level.
122	20	"Ignite! Revive Phoenix!!" / Explosive Flames! Revive Phoenix! Transliteration: "Bakuen! Rivaibu Fenikkusu!!" (Japanese: 爆炎!リヴァイブフェニックス!!)	August 13, 2018	March 8, 2019 (Canada); April 6, 2019 (United States)
123	21	"Joint Struggle! Tag Battle!!" / Cooperation! Tag-Team Battle! Transliteration: "Kyōtō! Taggu Batoru!" (Japanese: 共闘!タッグバトル!!)	August 20, 2018	March 9, 2019 (Canada); April 13, 2019 (United States)
124	22	"The Raging 3-way Bey Battle!!" / Three-Way Stand-Off! Transliteration: "Dotō no san Bey Batoru!!" (Japanese: 怒涛の3ベイバトル!!)	August 27, 2018	March 15, 2019 (Canada); April 20, 2019 (United States)
125	23	"Fierce Battle! Protect Beystar!!" / Operation: Protect the Bey Stars! Transliteration: "Gekisen! Mamore Beisutā!!" (Japanese: 激戦!守れベイスター!!)	September 3, 2018	March 16, 2019 (Canada); April 27, 2019 (United States)
126	24	"Achilles vs. Xcalibur!!" / Achilles vs Xcalius! Transliteration: "Akiresu VS Ekusukaribā!" (Japanese: 勇者（アキレス）VS勇者（エクスカリバー）!!)	September 10, 2018	April 27, 2019 (Canada); May 4, 2019 (United States)
127	25	"Super Dragon! Geist Fafnir!"; Transliteration: "Chōryū!! Gaisuto Fabuniru!" (Japanese: 超竜!ガイストファブニル!!)	September 17, 2018	April 28, 2019 (Canada); May 11, 2019 (United States)
128	26	"The Heated Up Battleship!!" / The Battleship Cruise! Final Voyage! Transliteration: "Hīto Appu! Batorushippu!" (Japanese: 白熱（ヒートアップ）！バトルシップ！！)	September 24, 2018	May 4, 2019 (Canada); June 1, 2019 (United States)
After saying goodbye to Laban, only four Bladers are left in the competition. After its upgrade, Achilles can now switch between stamina, defense, and attack modes, but Aiger struggles to harness this vast and dark potential.
129	27	"The Unrivaled Way!" / Road To Glory! Transliteration: "Tenkamusō e no michi!" (Japanese: 天下無双への道!)	October 1, 2018	May 5, 2019 (Canada); July 6, 2019 (United States)
With his title match against Valt coming up, Aiger needs to up his game to have any chance of becoming new World Champion. Luckily, Xavier introduces Aiger to the perfect teacher: Xander Shakadera.
130	28	"Valt Vs. Aiga!" / Valt Vs. Aiger! Transliteration: "Baruto VS Aiga!" (Japanese: バルトVSアイガ!!)	October 8, 2018	May 11, 2019 (Canada); July 13, 2019 (United States)
After all the battles and training, it's finally time for Aiger to take on Valt for the World Champion title! It's clear to everyone watching that Aiger's come a long way, but there may be something darker there than determination inside him.
131	29	"Lord of the Underworld, Dead Hades!" / Dark Prince! Dread Hades! Transliteration: "Meikei no Maō Deddo Hadesu!" (Japanese: 冥界の魔王デッドハデス!)	October 15, 2018	May 12, 2019 (Canada); July 20, 2019 (United States)
Aiger may have defeated Valt for the World Champion title but he still has an important and final opponent to face: Phi. After his victory in their heart-stopping showdown with Phi, Aiger face-to-face with a new terrifying foe, and is none other than Phi's younger twin brother, Hyde!
132	30	"Aiga Goes Wild!" / Aiger Goes Wild! Transliteration: "Aiga, Araburu!" (Japanese: アイガ、荒ぶる!)	October 22, 2018	May 18, 2019 (Canada); July 27, 2019 (United States)
As Hyde's predicted victory looms closer, it looks like Aiger might lose his World Champion belt as quickly as he won it. After the loss match to Hyde, training with the Bey Club devolves into a one-sided burst-fest as Aiger's corrupted dark resonance is growing.
133	31	"Rebirth! Super Z Valkyrie!" / Rebirth! Turbo Valtryek! Transliteration: "Shinsei! Chō-Z Varukirī!" (Japanese: 新生!超Zヴァルキリー!!)	October 29, 2018	May 19, 2019 (Canada); August 3, 2019 (United States)
because of the corrupted dark resonanse, Aiger's frustration is growing and Hyde's press conference only makes things worse. Out of nowhere, Kyle appears to take his shot against the famous Free De La Hoya and finally reveals what's behind the mask.
134	32	"Demon Castle, Dead Gran!" / Dread Tower! The Dark Citadel! Transliteration: "Ma-jō Deddo Guran!" (Japanese: 魔城デッドグラン!!)	November 5, 2018	May 25, 2019 (Canada); August 10, 2019 (United States)
Aiger and Ranjiro arrive at the Dread Tower, but with Hyde calling the shots, nothing is as it seems. And with the grand entrance of notorious Bey-burglar, Count Nightfell, things are about to get even more unpredictable.
135	33	"Tremble! Dead Gran's Trap" / Trapped In The Dread Tower! Transliteration: "Senritsu!! Deddo Guran no wana" (Japanese: 戦慄!!デッドグランの罠)	November 12, 2018	May 26, 2019 (Canada); August 17, 2019 (United States)
As they make their way through the Dread Tower, Aiger and Ranjiro find themselves in a sticky situation when they face off against the enigmatic Dr. Evel, But their real challenge is a fight against time and the ceiling!
136	34	"Fusion Bey! Eclipse!!" / Secret of The Fused Bey! Transliteration: "Gattai Bei! Ekuripusu!" (Japanese: 合体ベイ!エクリプス!!)	November 19, 2018	June 1, 2019 (Canada); August 24, 2019 (United States)
Having discovered the fruits of Dr. Evel's Blading research, Count challenges Aiger to a friendly match.
137	35	"Flame God! Cho-Z Spriggan!" / Spirit of Flame! Turbo Spryzen! Transliteration: "Enjin! Chōzetsu Supurigan!!" (Japanese: 炎神!超Zスプリガン!!)	November 26, 2018	June 2, 2019 (Canada); August 31, 2019 (United States)
Some familiar faces show up at the Dread Tower: Fubuki and the Legendary Blader Shu Kurenai! Shu is determined to show Aiger where true strength comes from Achilles, just as Valt once showed him.
138	36	"Aiga Battles the Darkness!" / The Darkness Within! Transliteration: "Aiga, to no tatakai!" (Japanese: アイガ、闇との戦い!!)	December 3, 2018	June 8, 2019 (Canada); September 7, 2019 (United States)
The Hyde show continues as Aiger finally gets his long-awaited rematch. Aiger is easilly defeated again but the battles don't stop there; current and former World Champions go head-to-head when Valt challenges Hyde.
139	37	"Super Z Clash! Showdown in the Demon Castle!" / Turbo Clash! Showdown at the Dark Citadel! Transliteration: "Chōzetsu Gekitotsu! Majō no Kessen!" (Japanese: 超ゼツ激突!魔城の決戦!!)	December 10, 2018	June 9, 2019 (Canada); September 14, 2019 (United States)
It's time for Valt to prove once and for all who belongs in the top world spot as he clashes with Hyde in a Dread Tower showdown to master his Turbo Awakening and become new World Champion once again. Frustrated by his earlier second loss to Hyde, Aiger storms out of the Dread Tower and runs into Phi.
140	38	"Explosive Birth! Super Z Achilles!" / Rebirth! Turbo Achilles! Transliteration: "Bakuretsu Tanjō! Cho-Z Akiresu!" (Japanese: 爆裂誕生!超Zアキレス!!!)	December 17, 2018	June 15, 2019 (Canada); September 21, 2019 (United States)
After Z Achilles's destruction by Phi's Black Revive Phoenix, Aiger gets free from the dark resonance's corruption and might have hit rock bottom, but that means the only way to go is up! With a little help from Shu, he returns home to forge his new Turbo Bey: Turbo Achilles.
141	39	"The Rematch With Aiga's Spirit!!" / Aiger's Rematch! Unbreakable Bond! Transliteration: "Aiga Tamashī no Rebenji!" (Japanese: アイガ魂の再戦（リベンジ ）!!)	December 24, 2018	June 16, 2019 (Canada); September 28, 2019 (United States)
An old friend of Valt's arrives in town: the one-and-only Master of the Wind, Kit Lopez! With Aiger struggling harder to perfect his Turbo Awakening, Kit helps him come up with a Plan B to take Hyde down once and for all.
142	40	"Knight of the Wind, Air Knight!" / Master of the Wind! Air Knight! Transliteration: "Kaze no Kishi Ea Naito!" (Japanese: 風の騎士エアナイト!)	January 7, 2019	July 28, 2019 (Canada); October 5, 2019 (United States)
143	41	"Hearts vs. Phi!" / Hyde vs. Phi! Transliteration: "Hātsu VS Fai!" (Japanese: 魔王(ハーツ)VS神(ファイ)！！)	January 14, 2019	August 3, 2019 (Canada); October 12, 2019 (United States)
Phi comes out of nowhere to challenge Hyde, his younger twin brother. Knowing that in Dread Tower, first burst gets the win, he provokes Hyde to be tired and fired up by the dark resonance and destroys Dread Hades. Then he makes his Phoenix bind with Hades and gets his new Turbo Bey: Dread Phoenix.
144	42	"Battle Royal! A Strategy for a Great Battle!" / Battle Royale! Beyblade Heroes! Transliteration: "Batoru Roiyaru! Senryaku Daisakusen!" (Japanese: バトルロイヤル!戦略大作戦!!)	January 21, 2019	August 4, 2019 (Canada); October 19, 2019 (United States)
Beigoma Academy's principal surprises the young ones by introducing the six-way battle royal stadium. Suoh Genji makes an unexpected appearance and challenges Aiger's Turbo Achilles. Moreover Toki seems fired up.
145	43	"God of Destruction! Dead Phoenix!" / Lord of Destruction! Dread Phoenix! Transliteration: "Hakaishin! Deddo Fenikkusu!" (Japanese: 破壊神!デッドフェニックス!!)	January 28, 2019	August 10, 2019 (Canada); October 26, 2019 (United States)
Phi, after successfully taking over his younger twin brother's Dread Hades, makes his Phoenix bind with Hades and gets his new Turbo Bey: Dread Phoenix. He claims to be the Lord of Destruction and makes his first target Free De La Hoya. He has had a battle with Free and destroys Geist Fafnir into pieces.
146	44	"Super Z Special Training: Kingdom Edition!" / Turbo Training! Xavier's Kingdom! Transliteration: "Chōzetsu Tokkun, Otoku-hen!!" (Japanese: 超ゼツ特訓、王国編!!)	February 4, 2019	August 25, 2019 (Canada); November 2, 2019 (United States)
Aiger sets out on a training journey to build his bond with Achilles, and his first destination is Xavier's royal palace. At reuniting with Aiger, Xavier quickly takes him through various training exercises. Tile splitting, karate exercises, balance training – Aiger challenges the activities Xavier does on a daily basis. As the pair face off in a stadium built for those specializing in attack, Xavier detects some hesitation within Aiger. What's holding him back for real!?
147	45	"Super Z Special Training: Savanna Chapter!!" / Turbo Training! Survival on The Savanna! Transliteration: "Chōzetsu Tokkun, Sabanna-hen!!" (Japanese: 超ゼツ特訓、サバンナ編!!)	February 11, 2019	August 31, 2019 (Canada); November 9, 2019 (United States)
148	46	"Fly! Aerial Showdown!!" / Take Flight! Aerial Showdown! Transliteration: "Tobe! Kūchū Daikessen!" (Japanese: 飛べ!空中大決戦!!)	February 18, 2019	September 1, 2019 (Canada); November 16, 2019 (United States)
149	47	"The God of Flames VS The God of Destruction!!" / Spirit of Flame vs. Lord of Destruction! Transliteration: "Enjin VS Hakkaishin!" (Japanese: 炎神VS破壊神!!)	February 25, 2019	September 2, 2019 (Canada); November 23, 2019 (United States)
150	48	"Our Beyblade!" / Blading Together! Turbo Awakening! Transliteration: "Oretachi no Beiburēdo!" (Japanese: 俺たちのベイブレード!)	March 4, 2019	September 3, 2019 (Canada); November 30, 2019 (United States)
151	49	"Aiga vs. Phi!!" / Aiger vs. Phi! Transliteration: "Aiga VS Fai!" (Japanese: アイガVSファイ!!)	March 11, 2019	August 18, 2019 (Canada); December 7, 2019 (United States)
152	50	"Aiga's Super Z Resonance!!" / Aiger's Turbo Resonance! Transliteration: "Aiga, Chōzetsu Kyōmei!" (Japanese: アイガ、超ゼツ共鳴!!)	March 18, 2019	August 18, 2019 (Canada); December 14, 2019 (United States)
153	51	"Bonds! Aiga vs. Valt!!" / Bonding! Aiger vs Valt! Transliteration: "Kizuna! Aiga VS Baruto!!" (Japanese: 絆!アイガVSバルト!!)	March 25, 2019	September 8, 2019 (Canada); December 21, 2019 (United States)
Aiger wins the title match once again and there is a birth of new bond between Valt and Aiger.
