= Trompo =

Spinning object

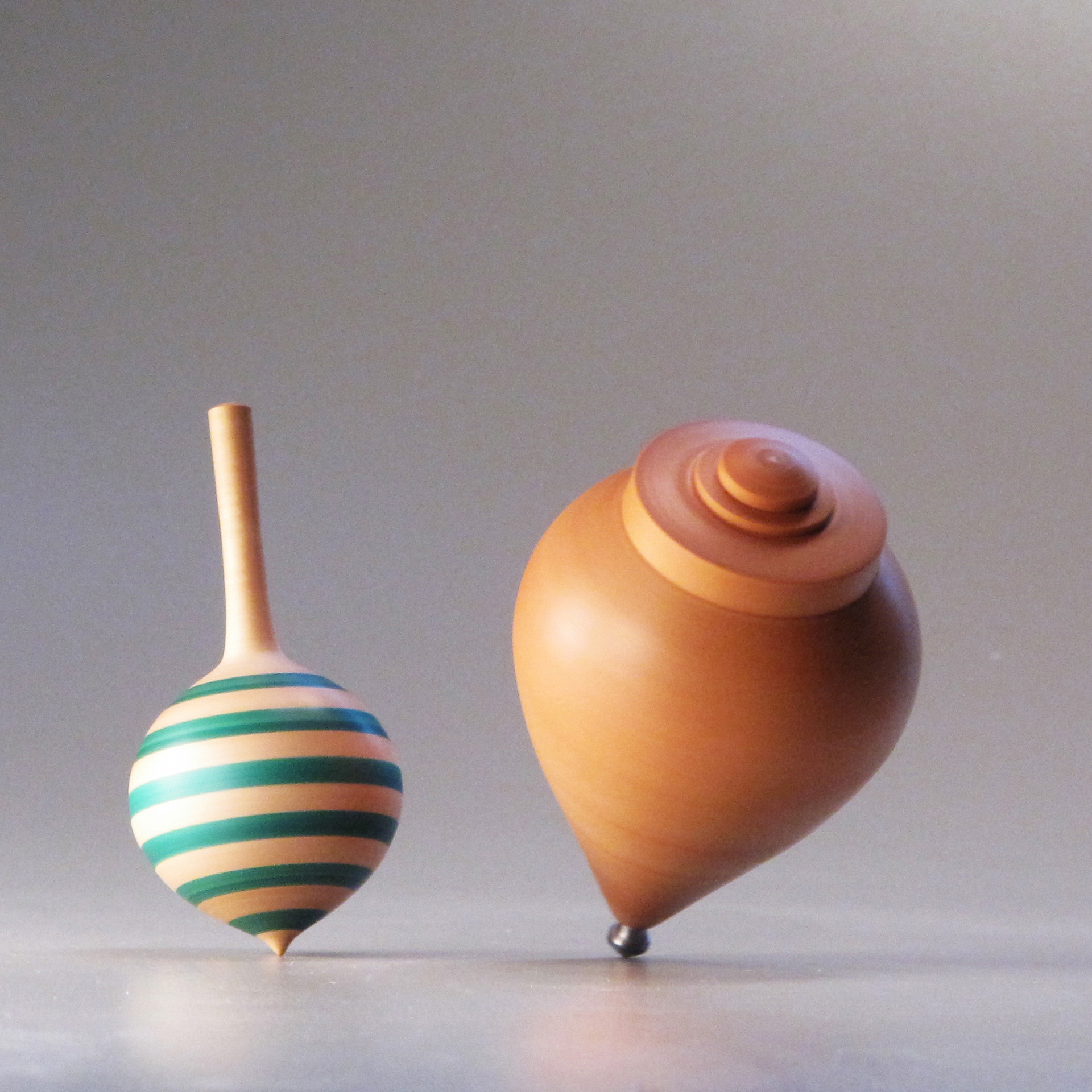
The top on the left is spun between the fingers – the larger (Trompo) is launched by winding with a string and throwing to the ground.

A trompo is a wooden spinning top typically comes in various types of shape vary depending on culture but commonly in a half sphere appearance look on top with a conical look on the bottom portion while a metal tip is attached on the bottom. While various ones operates differently than the others, all is required a long string need to be wrap around the body. As you see in the side by side compression to the original top on the left that is spun between the finger.

== Etymology ==
These toys are popular in Latin America where the name trompo emerged, but there are many different local names. In Spain, these toys may be called trompo or peonza, perinola, and pirinola. In the Philippines, they are called trumpo or turumpo, while in Portugal they are called pião.

In India, the toy is called lattu, latim, pambaram, buguri, or bongaram. Children make these tops by nailing wood and spin them with twisted jute rope. In Japan, similar tops are known as koma, with most cities having a particular design.

In Germany, a Peitschenkreisel may also be called Doppisch, Dildop, Pindopp, Dilledopp, Triesel or Tanzknopf (roughly dancing top)

In Morocco, the toy is called trombia, and it is often made out of wood and painted in a reddish brown color.

In Dutch, the toy is called "priktol". A "tol" is a top. An other type of top is the "zweeptol". A "zweep" is a whip.

== History ==
The existence of trompo origin during the Uruk period. Variety of trompo usually consistent in vary of size, color, and the material are typically made out plastic, wood, clay, and others. The first ever identical that was found was located along the mountain of eastern Turkey, through Syria, and across Iraq. As Rome and Greece adapted to it as a toy, not long after Eastern culture started to expanded on it which ultimately got introduced on the West.

== Description of motion ==
Principles of rotation

The gyroscopic effect allows the trompo to spin over its point until the force of gravity ends up at an angle with respect to the top's axis of rotation, causing a variation in the location of the center of gravity as the trompo undergoes precession (where the axis of rotation of the trompo moves in a circular path). The fall of the top is directly proportional to the angle between the direction of gravity on the trompo and the top's axis of rotation. The fall is also directly proportional to the magnitude of the force of gravity and is inversely proportional to the trompo's angular velocity.

As air resistance and friction with the ground begin to slow the trompo's spin, its center of gravity begins to destabilize and the top's bottom point begins to trace a circular path with the ground. Soon the trompo becomes fully unbalanced and it falls to the ground, rolling until it comes to rest.

This general motion is largely shared among many trompo variants, but differences in several design parameters (such as the mass distribution, friction between the bottom point and the ground, and the spinning method) can still lead to significant variation in the aforementioned variables.

== Form ==
The trompo's form has varied enormously throughout history. Though trompos have traditionally been cone-shaped, there are also diverse variations in trompo form across regions. However, despite these regional differences in design, all trompos are constructed to be capable of employing the gyroscopic effect.

Trompos generally have an approximately pear-shaped body and are usually made of a hard wood such as hawthorn, oak or beech, although new resins and strong plastic materials have also been used. Clay trompos have also been found from ancient civilizations near the Euphrates river. Whipping tops often have a more cylindrical shape to provide a bigger surface to be struck by the whip.

A trompo has a button-shaped on top, usually bigger than the tip on which it spins, and it is generally made of the same material as the rest of the body.

The base of a trompo is a stud or spike which may have a groove or roller-bearing to facilitate lifting the spinning trompo with a whip or string without imposing much friction on the body.

The trompo surface may be painted or decorated, and some versions incorporate synthetic sound devices. The small size diameter and low mass of most trompos means that mechanical whistles would cause excessive drag (physics) and reduce their spinning time.

The Philippine trumpo differs in the tip, which is straight and pointed. It usually looks like a nail embedded in a wooden spheroid.

== Play ==
Winding the trompo

Basic throw

Playing with a trompo consists of throwing the top and having it spin on the floor. Due to its shape, a trompo spins on its axis and swirls around its conic tip which is usually made of iron or steel. A trompo uses a string wrapped around it to get the necessary spin needed. The player must roll the cord around the trompo from the metallic tip up. The user must then tie the string in a knot on the button-shaped tip before releasing it. When rolling the cord around the trompo, the cord must be tightly attached to it. The technique for throwing a trompo varies. One end of the cord must be rolled around the player's fingers and with the same hand the trompo must be held with the metallic tip facing upwards.

Championships are held in different Latin American countries, especially in Mexico, Colombia, Peru, Cuba, Nicaragua, and Puerto Rico where it is very popular among children of the middle and lower classes.

In Mexico most trompos sold are made of plastic, with a metal tip, and sometimes they are made of wood. There is a popular game called picotazos, where the main goal is to destroy the opponents' trompo. Another game is where a circle is drawn on the ground and a coin is placed in the middle, and the goal here is to strike the coin.

In Puerto Rico, trompos are sometimes played similarly to certain marble games, with trompos being placed in a circle drawn on the ground. The goal of this variant is to knock the trompos out of the circle. Failure to spin or spinning in the circle causes your trompo to be placed in the circle, and another person has a turn to spin. Trompos in Puerto Rico and Chile are frequently modified to have a sharper point.

José Miguel Agrelot, a Puerto Rican comedian, hosted a long-standing television program, Encabulla y Vuelve y Tira, whose name described the action of throwing and spinning a trompo. One of his comedic characterizations, mischievous boy Torito Fuertes, was a one-time sponsor of a line of trompos.

The Filipino trumpo is basically played in the same manner, except that a knot is not tied into the tip before throwing it for the spin.

== See also ==
- Top
- Gyroscope
- Bauernroulette
- Yo-yo
- Beyblade
- Fidget spinner
- knucklebones
- Paengi Chigi
