= Spinning top (disambiguation) =

A spinning top is a type of toy.

Spinning top may also refer to:

- Spinning top (candlestick pattern), a Japanese candlestick pattern
- The Spinning Top, a 2009 album by Graham Coxon
- Spinning Top (sculpture), a 2015 sculpture by Maurycy Gomulicki
- The Spinning Topps, characters in Sliders
- "Spinning Top", a song by Nazareth, a B-side of the 1973 single "Bad Bad Boy"
- "Spinning Top", a song by XTC from White Music
- A nickname for FC Schalke 04's style of play in the 1930s and 1940s
- Spinning Top (EP), a 2019 album by Got7

== See also ==
- Spinning (disambiguation)
- Top (disambiguation)
