= Whizzer =

Whizzer may refer to:

== Fictional characters ==
- Whizzer (Marvel Comics), several characters in Marvel Comics publications:
  - Speed Demon (Marvel Comics), formerly known as the Whizzer
  - Whizzer (Robert Frank), a superhero
  - Whizzer (Stanley Stewart), a member of the Squadron Supreme
- Wizzer, a Dalmatian puppy in 101 Dalmatians
- Whizzer Brown, from a trilogy of musicals that consists of In Trousers (1979), March of the Falsettos (1981) and Falsettoland (1990), the latter two of which were combined into the musical Falsettos (1992)
- "Whizzer" Deaver, from the American TV series ALF

== Nickname ==
- Byron White (1917-2002), associate justice of the Supreme Court of the United States and football player
- Wilford White (1928-2013), American National Football League player

== Other uses ==
- Whizzer, a part of Whizzer and Chips, a British comic
- Whizzer (motorcycles), a line of bicycle engines produced in the United States from 1939 to 1965 and revived in 1997
- Hamilton Whizzers, an ice hockey team
- Watson's "Whizzers", a group of pilots, engineers and maintenance men assigned by the United States Army Air Forces to capture and evaluate German aeronautical technology during and after World War II
- An overhook, a wrestling hold
- Whizzer (roller coaster), two identical roller coasters at California's Great America (now defunct) and Six Flags Great America

== See also ==
- Wizzzer, a gyroscopic top from Mattel
