= Tippe top =

Spinning physics toy

Tippe Top
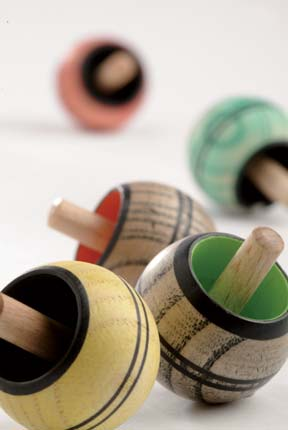
- Type: Top

A tippe top turning upside down

A tippe top is a kind of top that when spun, will spontaneously invert itself to spin on its narrow stem. It was invented by a German nurse, Helene Sperl in 1891.

== Description ==
A tippe top usually has a body shaped like a truncated sphere, with a short narrow stem attached perpendicular to the center of the flat circular surface of truncation. The stem may be used as a handle to pick up the top, and is also used to spin the top into motion.

When a tippe top is spun at a high angular velocity, its stem slowly tilts downwards more and more until it suddenly lifts the body of the spinning top off the ground, with the stem now pointing downward. Eventually, as the top's spinning rate slows, it loses stability and eventually topples over, like an ordinary top.

At first glance the top's inversion may mistakenly seem to be a situation where the object spontaneously gains overall energy. This is because the inversion of the top raises the object's center of mass, which means the potential energy has in fact increased. What causes the inversion (and the increase in potential energy) is a torque due to surface friction, which also decreases the kinetic energy of the top, so the total energy does not actually increase.

Once the top is spinning on its stem, it does not spin in the opposite direction to which its spin was initiated. For example, if the top was spun clockwise, as soon as it is on its stem, it will be spinning clockwise viewed from above. This constant spin direction is due to conservation of angular momentum.

== Theory ==
It is usually assumed that the speed of the tippe top at the point of contact with the plane is zero (i.e. there is no slippage). However, as indicated by P. Contensou, this assumption does not lead to a correct physical description of the top's motion. The unusual behavior of the top can be fully described by considering dry friction forces at the contact point.

== See also ==
- Euler's Disk – another spinning physics toy that exhibits surprising behavior
- Tennis racket theorem – a similar dynamical rotation effect
- The top was the subject of a theoretical problem at the 2019 Asian Physics Olympiad.
