= Gasing pangkah =

Competitive Malay game of spinning tops

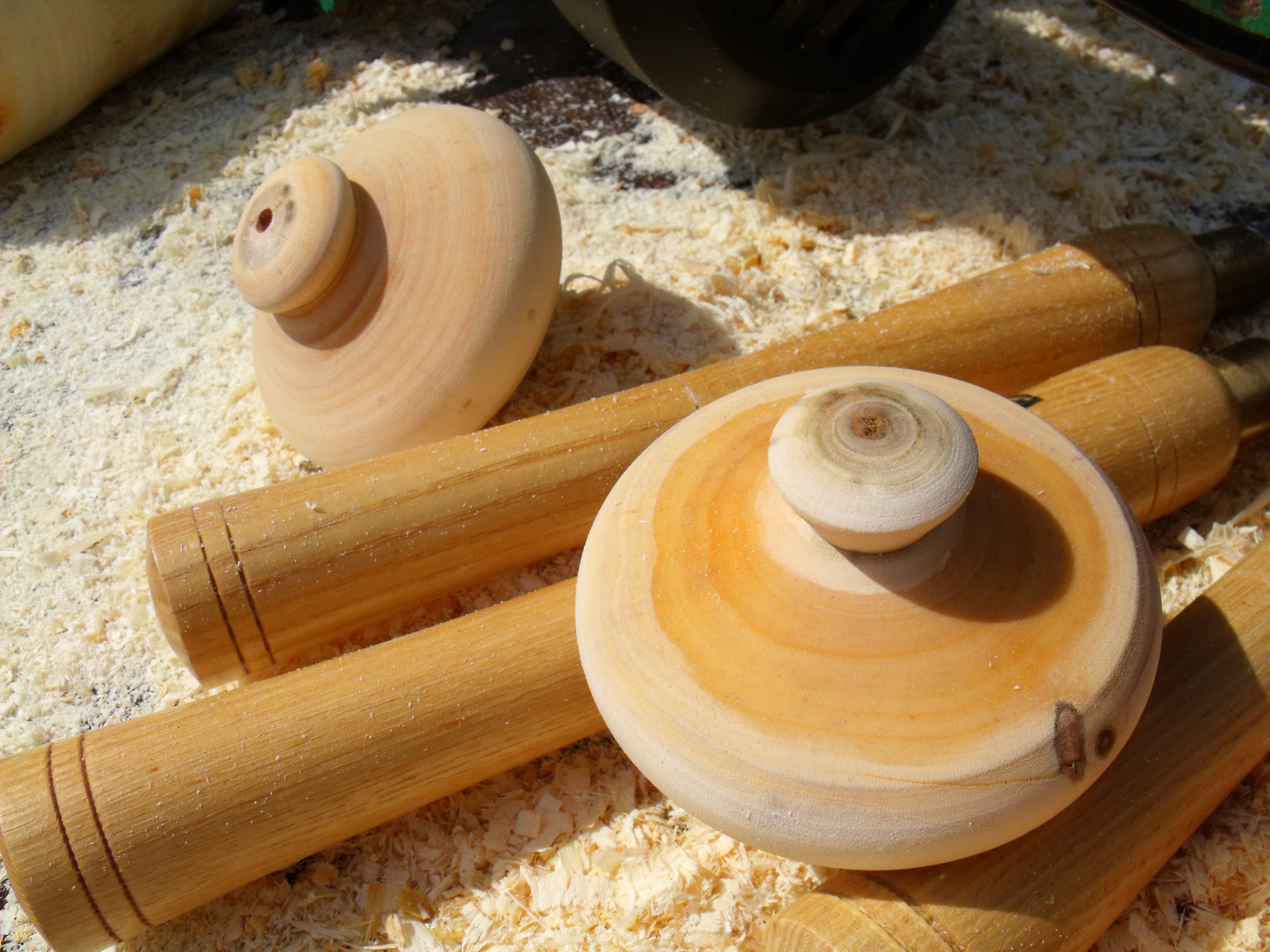
Two unfinished Gasing

Gasing pangkah is a competitive Malay game of spinning tops (in Malay: gasing) in which two or more players compete to strike (pangkah) each other's top, aiming to knock them out of a circle, make it fall over and stop spinning, or break apart.

== Description ==
The game is played between teams of players: the attacking team's objective is to strike the defending team's tops by casting their own tops into the circle. Tops collide with a distinctive crack. An elimination of a defending player's top is only considered valid if the attacker's top remains spinning. Gasing are wooden peg-tops, turned from close-grained wood. They are said to be able to spin for up to twenty minutes. The wood must be chosen carefully, or else the top will fall quickly; the preferred woods are keranji, koran, and cengal.

== History ==
The game of battling tops was brought to the Malay Archipelago by Arab traders, and it was widely played during the Malacca Sultanate era. It was formerly played in village fields to celebrate after the rice harvest season.

In modern times, the game has organized competitions, and a sporting association, the Malaysian Gasing Association. The number of gasing players declined by the 21st century, and there are fewer craftsmen who make the tops. However, the sport has seen some growth as well. To promote the game, the Malaysian Gasing Association runs workshops in schools and showcases the game at cultural festivals. Gasing competitions have also attracted foreign participants; a 2025 competition included teams from Brunei and Singapore.

The game continues to be played, though rarely, in modern Singapore among the older generation. There was a short-lived Singapore Gasing Federation (Fedegasi) in 1979.

== See also ==
- Beyblade
- Pambaram
