= Spinning top =

Spinning toy

An assortment of spinning tops

Spinning a top using a cord

A spinning top, also called a spin-top or simply a top, is a toy with a squat round body that tapers to a point at the bottom, designed to be spun on its vertical axis. A spinning top balances on its tip due to the gyroscopic effect, which stabilizes its rotation by counteracting gravity, allowing it to spin for a long time.

Tops can be of different sizes and can be made from many types of materials, including wood, metal, and plastic. They are often decorated with colorful and sometimes intricate or ornate designs. Tops come in different varieties, such as peg-tops and whip-tops. They can be set in motion by spinning a peg at the apex with fingers or between the palms of the hands, by rapidly pulling away a string or whip coiled around the top, or by pushing down on the built-in auger (spiral plunger).

Once set in motion, a spinning top usually wobbles for a few seconds, then spins upright for a length of time depending on its speed and friction. It starts wobbling again with increasing amplitude as it loses energy, until it eventually tips over and rolls on its side.

Tops have been used since antiquity, often used alone or in competitive games where players compete to make their top spin for as long as possible or knock out opponents' tops. Some tops have sides with symbols or inscriptions and are used like dice to inject randomness into games or for divination and ritual purposes.

== History ==
=== Origins ===
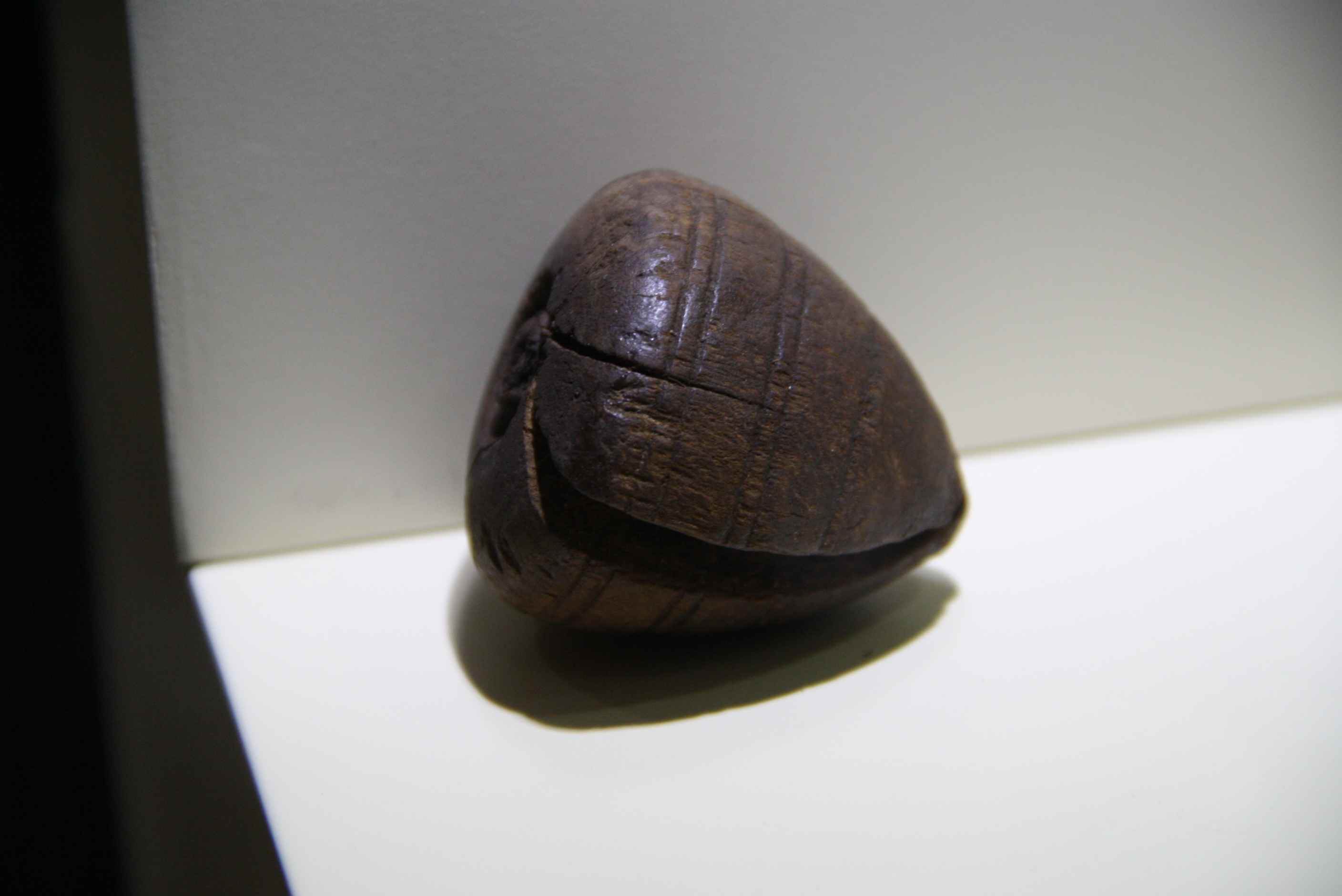
Ancient Roman wooden spinning top, from Tebtunis, Egypt, dating from the 1st–3rd century CE

Spinning tops emerged independently in various cultures worldwide and are the oldest known toys, found by archaeologists on every inhabited continent. A decorated top was found in Tutankhamun's tomb dating to the 14th century BCE. Archaeologists have found clay spinning tops in Mesopotamia (modern Iraq) dating back about 5,000 years. Tops dating back to around 1250 BCE, such as whip-tops, have been found in China. Tops were used as toys in ancient Rome and Greece and are mentioned in Homer's Iliad, Aristophanes's The Birds, and Virgil's Aeneid.

The oldest tops found in Africa were from Egypt and came in the form of decorated stone discs with a central hole. These discs were found in the First Dynasty tomb of the official Hemaka at Saqqara (c. 2900 BCE). They are interpreted by the Egyptian Museum in Cairo and by recent scholarship as 'spinning tops'; another was excavated at the Greco-Roman town of Karanis in the Faiyum. Elsewhere in Africa, there is evidence of the history of spinning tops, although it is ethnographic rather than archaeological. Besides entertainment, tops were used in Ancient Greece for divination, more specifically cledonomancy.

The author Douglas W. Gould mentions naturally spinning seeds such as maple, polished tools called celts (leading to rattlebacks), the fire-drill, the spindle whorl, and the potter's wheel as possible inspirations or predecessors to the top, which he assumes was developed multiple times in multiple places.

=== Post-classical era ===
John Gendall (1790–1865) – Children Spinning Tops

Tops were a common sight across Europe by the 11th century. Literary references suggest 16th-century villages kept a large top that people spun in cold weather to keep themselves warm, but the truth of this is contested. One gambling top, the teetotum, had spread across England and Ireland by the 16th century. It had four sides, each marked with the Latin words for "nothing", "half", "everything" and "put in"; players placed a stake, and the side facing up when the top stopped decided whether they won or lost. The "put in" side instructed that more should be added to the stake. The teetotum was later adapted into dreidel, a Jewish toy played with during Hanukkah. The game was originally unconnected to Hanukkah and had been played in many languages for centuries.

In Kyoto, during the Heian period, the koma, a basic spinning top consisting of a shell spun by a string, became popular. Sources differ as to whether the toy originated in Japan or China. A type of spinning top called a beigoma, a cast-metal form of the earlier koma, became popular in the Taisho period.

In Malaysia, top-spinning became established in Malay society centuries ago as a pastime for men during the free time that followed the rice harvest. In villages on Malaysia's east coast, particularly in Kelantan, it grew from a leisure activity into a regional sport, with contests held throughout the year. Play takes two main forms: a spinning contest, won by whoever spins theirs the longest, and a striking match, in which players try to hit an opponent's spinning top so that it topples. The striking game is known as gasing pangkah, from the Malay words for "top" and "strike". A well-thrown gasing can spin for two hours.

In Brazil, the top was introduced by the Portuguese during the colonization process. It could be used by white children to hurt slaves; thus the origin of the saying "lascar-se no pião" (to chip oneself on the top). The toy became an intercultural product in the country, also being used among several indigenous peoples.

In the 19th century, tops made out of empty snail shells were discovered among peoples of Nigeria.

=== Modern era ===
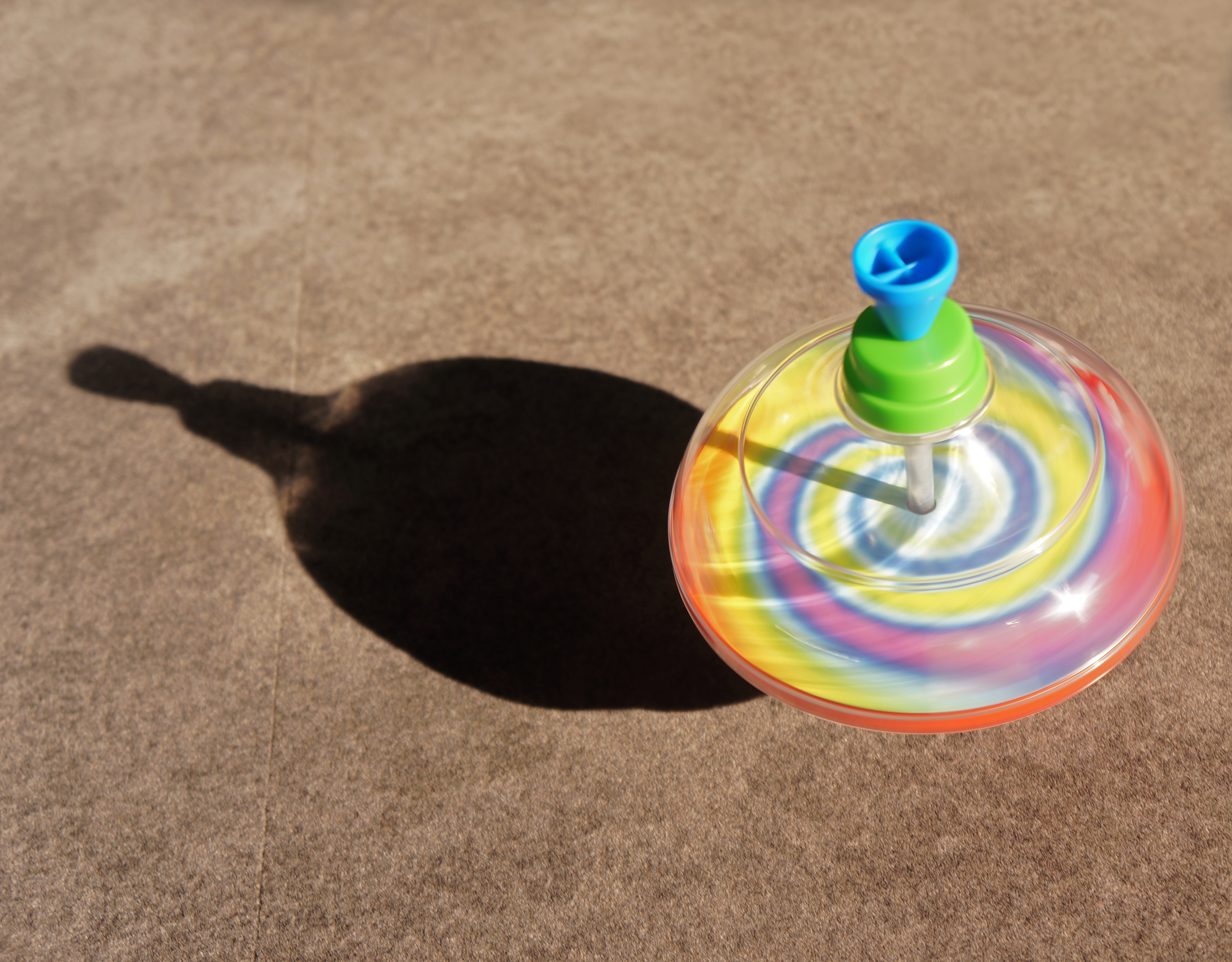
Modern rainbow colored spinning top

In 1891, Helene Sperl of Munich patented a self-inverting top, the Wendekreisel, in Germany. Known today as the tippe top, when spun fast enough, its stem gradually tilts downwards until the body lifts off the ground and the top spins on its stem. The toy became popular in 1950, after Danish engineer Werner Ostberg invented it anew.

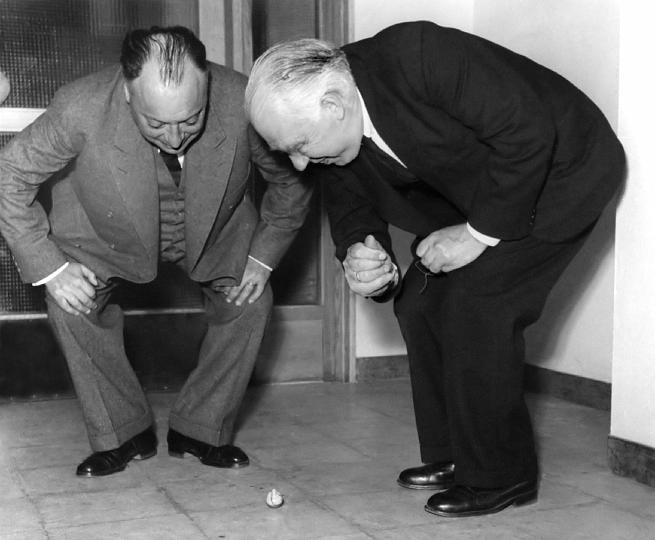
Physicists Niels Bohr and Wolfgang Pauli studying a tippee top at the opening of Lund University's new physics institute in 1951

Spinning tops were popular in cities in the 19th and 20th centuries. In the United States, tops became widely popular in the 1960s because of promotions by the Duncan Toys Company, which made tops initially from wood painted in various colors, and later from plastic. In 1963 and 1964, Duncan Toys sponsored local competitions which led to grand national finales at Disneyland, California, with a prize of $5,000 USD. These national championships only lasted two years, and the Duncan Toys Company filed for bankruptcy in 1965.

In 1999, Japanese toy company Takara, later Takara Tomy, released the Beyblade, a spinning top toy designed for "fights" wherein two Beyblades spin against each other and the last to stop spinning wins. The toy line also led to the anime (such as Beyblade Burst etc.) and manga Beyblade by Takao Aoki. "Beyblade" was inspired by the earlier beigoma.

Some role-playing games use spinning tops to augment dice in generating randomized results; in this case, they are referred to as spinners.

In 2022, the top was the 77th toy inducted into the National Toy Hall of Fame at The Strong National Museum of Play.

=== Color demonstrations with tops ===
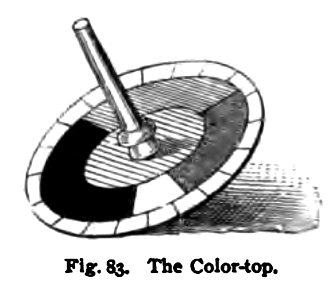
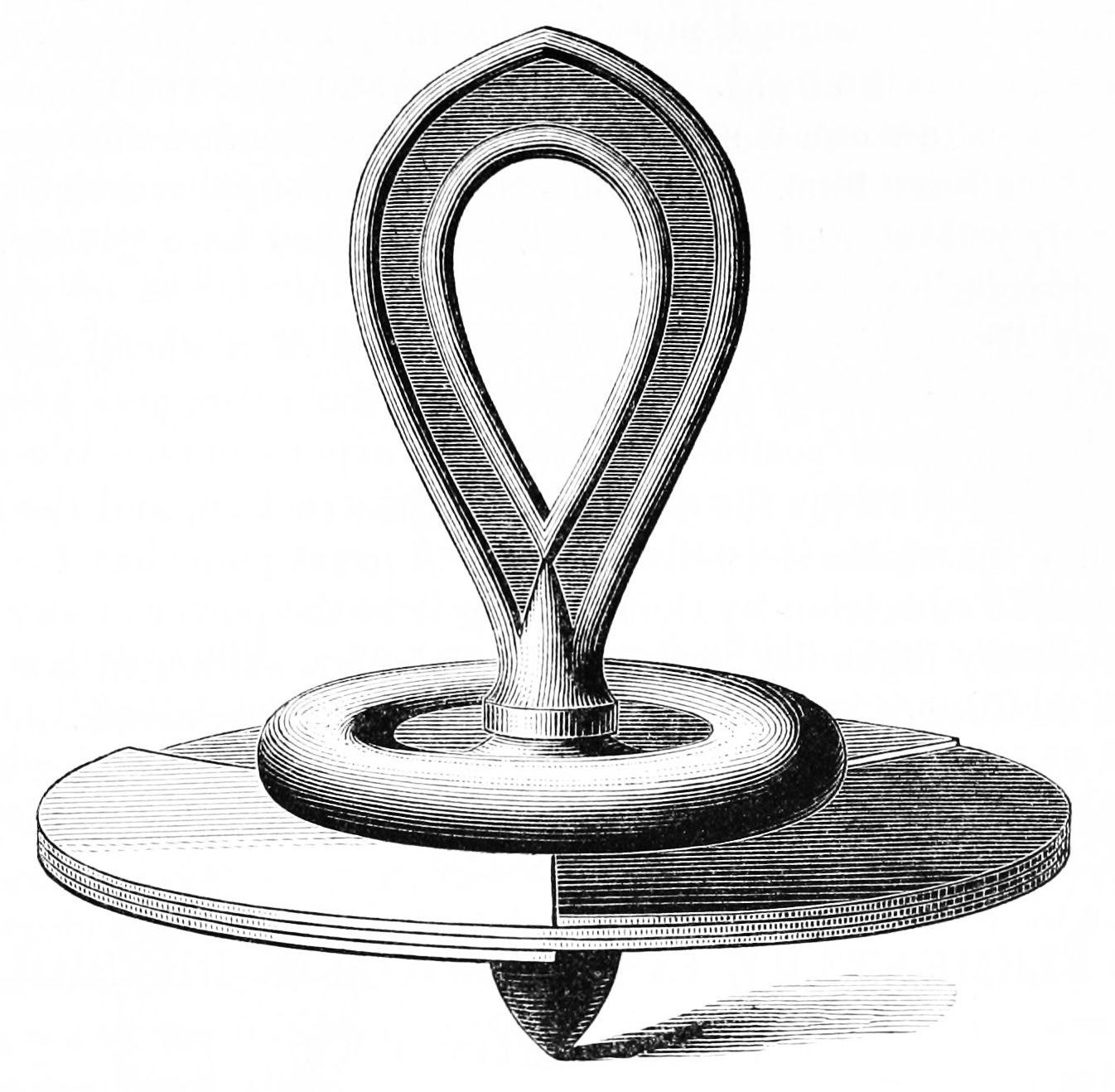
Maxwell's color top (1895) and one from Popular Science Monthly (1877)

James David Forbes and James Clerk Maxwell used a spinning top with Maxwell's disc to demonstrate visual properties (see color triangle). By rapidly spinning the top, Forbes created the illusion of a single color that was a mixture of the primaries:

[The] experiments of Professor J. D. Forbes, which I witnessed in 1849 ... [established] that blue and yellow do not make green, but a pinkish tint, when neither prevails in the combination ... [and the] result of mixing yellow and blue was, I believe, not previously known.

— James Clerk Maxwell, Experiments on colour, as perceived by the eye, with remarks on colour-blindness (1855), Transactions of the Royal Society of Edinburgh

Maxwell took this a step further by using a circular scale around the rim with which to measure the ratios of the primaries, choosing vermilion, emerald, and ultramarine.

== Spinning methods ==
=== Twirling ===
Smaller tops with short stems are set in motion by twirling the stem with the fingers. Twirling involves pinching the stem between the thumb and another finger. This other finger then moves towards the palm to create rotation. Finger twirling is the most common method, primarily used by beginners with well-balanced tops and easy-to-grasp stems.

Tops with long stems can be powered by spinning the stem between the palms. This method is more efficient, powering the top longer and letting it spin in a more controlled area rather than a broader, wider space. This type of top may have developed from a tool used to create fire. This top could be used to make fire by spinning quickly in a single spot for a period of time.

=== Strings and whips ===
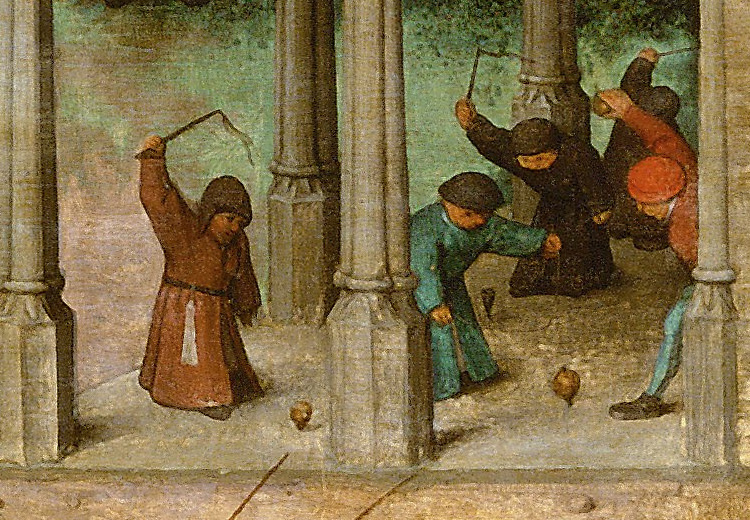
Children whipping tops, detail from Children's Games (1560)

A typical fist-sized model, traditionally made of wood with a blunt iron tip, is meant to be set in motion by briskly pulling a string or rope tightly coiled around the body. The rope is best wound starting near the tip and progressing up along the widening body.

These tops may be thrown forward while firmly grasping the end of the string and pulling it back. The forward momentum contributes to the string's tension and the final spin rate. Malaysian gasing are launched the same way, and the players have to hold in a way that the string must be wound neatly and tightly for the top to spin for a long time without wobbling or tipping over early.

In some throwing styles, the top is thrown upside-down, but the first loop of the rope is wound around a stubby "head". Then, a sudden yank on the head as the string finishes unwinding causes the spinning top to flip over and land on its tip.

Whipping tops, by contrast, are kept spinning with a whip that has a lash. The whip's string can start the top and keep it rotating by striking it from time to time.

=== Mechanical ===
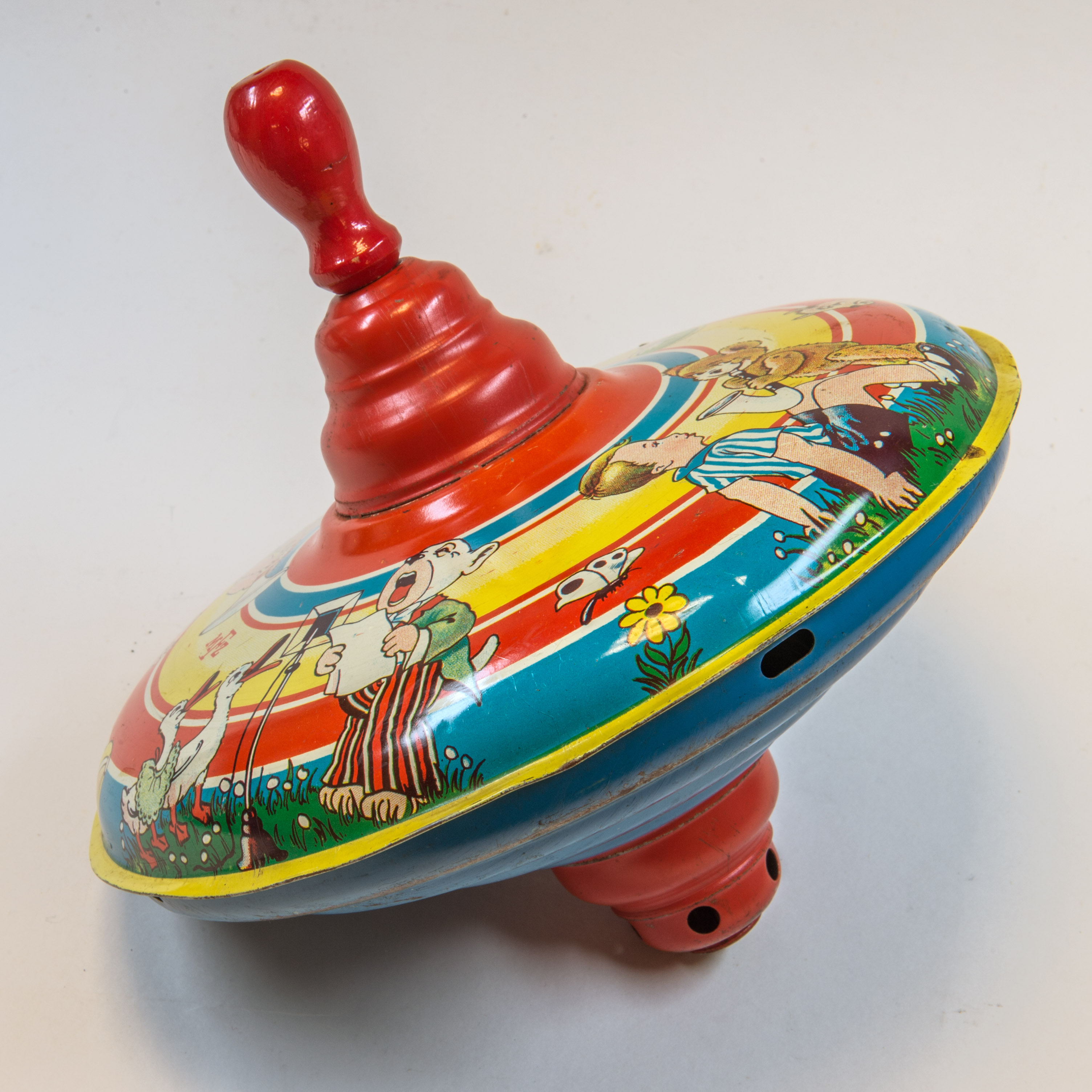
A plunger-operated humming top

Some larger models are set in motion by pressing down or pumping a central handle at the apex connected to a built-in metal auger (spiral plunger). In these models, the part that spins may be enclosed in a hollow metal shell, with the same axis but decoupled from it; so that the toy may appear to be stationary but "magically" balanced on its tip. Humming tops are variations of these, designed to emit a droning sound as they rotate. Some mechanical top designs have a crank on top of the spinner which can utilize gear ratios to quickly accelerate it.

Beyblades occasionally feature rack-and-gear mechanisms: a toothed rack, connected to a gear inside the top, is drawn out from the spinner at speed, causing rotation.

== Physics ==
A precessing gyroscope

The motion of a top is described by equations of rigid body dynamics, specifically the theory of rotating rigid bodies. When a spinning top tilts, gravity exerts a torque about its point of contact with the surface. This torque changes the direction of the top's angular momentum, causing its axis of rotation to trace a circle around the vertical. This motion is called precession.

Because of the small contact area between the tip and the underlying surface and the large rotational inertia of its body, a top spun on a hard surface usually spins for longer without additional energy input.

Typically, the top wobbles at first, until friction and torque between the tip and the underlying surface force it to spin with the axis steady and upright. Long-standing scientific studies show that reducing the friction increases the time needed to reach this stable state (unless the top is so unbalanced that it falls over before reaching it). After spinning upright for an extended period in "the sleep position", the angular momentum gradually lessens due to friction, leading to increasing precession, which ultimately causes the top to topple and roll some distance on its side. In the "sleep" period, less friction means longer "sleep" time, which in some but not all cases results in a longer total spinning time. Depending on the moment of inertia and initial angular momentum, higher or lower friction can be optimized to ensure the longest period of "sleep" time, which is correlated with higher global spin durations.

The total spinning time of a top is generally increased by increasing its moment of inertia and lowering its center of gravity. These variables, however, are constrained by the need to prevent the body from touching the ground.

Asymmetric tops of virtually any shape can also be created and designed to balance.

A detailed classical analysis of tops, Über die Theorie des Kreisels, was published in 4 volumes between 1910 and 1922 by the researchers Felix Klein and Arnold Sommerfeld. It was translated into English as The Theory of the Top by Raymond J. Nagem and Guido Sandri. The work is the foundation of many subsequent studies.

== Types of tops ==
=== General classification ===
A top is started with a simple support and cord

- Twirler tops are cast by twisting the stem with hands or fingers. Many common tops fall into this category.
- Supported tops are set in motion by pulling a cord while a support of some kind holds the top in place. James Clerk Maxwell's color demonstration tops were of this type.
- Peg-tops usually have pear-shaped bodies without a stem. Cords wrapped around the body of the top are used to launch them to the ground.
- Whip-tops are cast with a whip. They are found worldwide, with the greatest incidence in Europe, the Americas, and northeastern Asia. In Europe, eel skin whips were preferred. The whip consists of a stock and a lash. The stock of the whip is held in the hand, while the lash is wrapped around the top. The stock is then swung to cast the top.
- Tippe tops spontaneously turn around and spin upside-down on the stick.

=== Specific kinds of tops ===
Competing tops include:

- Battling Tops
- Beigoma, in Japan
- Beyblade
- Gasing pangkah, in Malaysia
- Spin Fighters
- Tuj lub, among Hmong people
- Pambaram, in India and Bangladesh

Gaming and other tops include:

- Dreidel, traditionally played during the Jewish holiday of Hanukkah
- Lattu, a throwing top used in India and Bangladesh
- Levitating top
- Perinola, a six-sided top, similar to the dreidel, that is used for a similar game in Latin America
- Rattleback, or celt, a top that reverses its spin direction
- Teetotum
- Trompo, or "whipping top"
- Wizzzer

Modern tops have several sophisticated features, such as ball bearings of ruby or a hard ceramic like tungsten carbide or other materials such as sapphire, copper, brass, bronze, iron, micarta, titanium, zirconium and exotic material variants, that reduce the friction with the ground surface. Functional art tops have become collectibles built using various techniques in metal-working, glass-working, and wood-working.

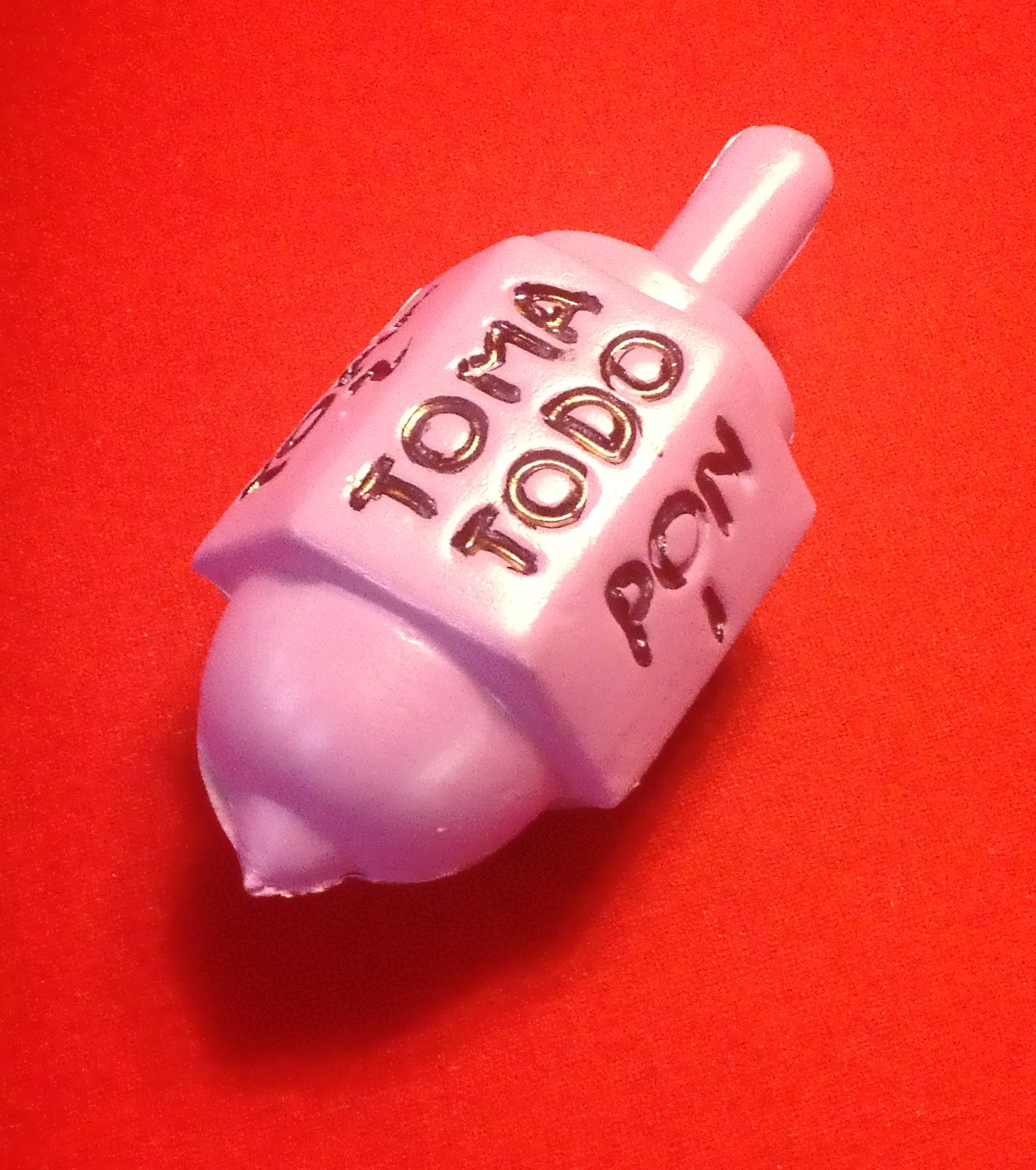
A plastic perinola, a twirler-type top

Wooden dreidels, often used in Jewish party games during Hanukkah

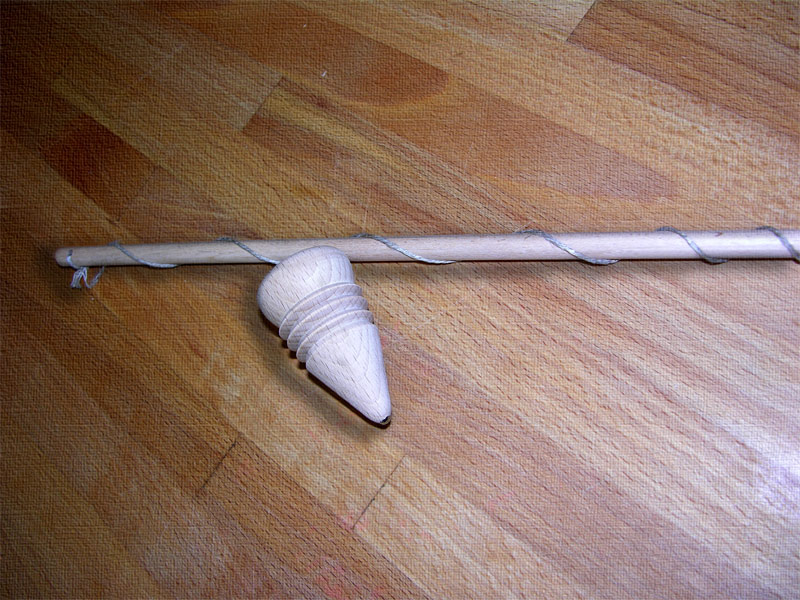
A German whip-top

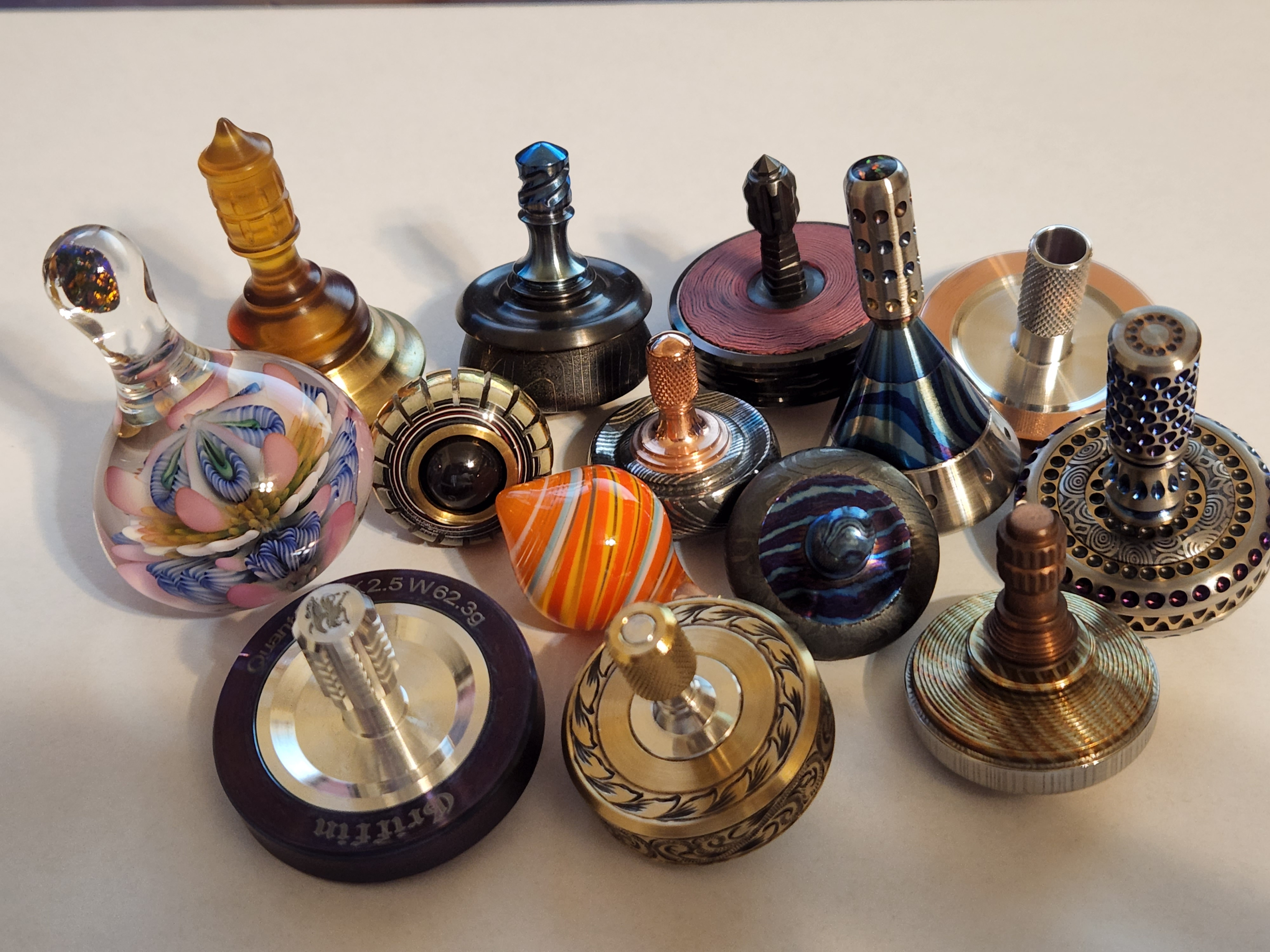
Modern functional art tops

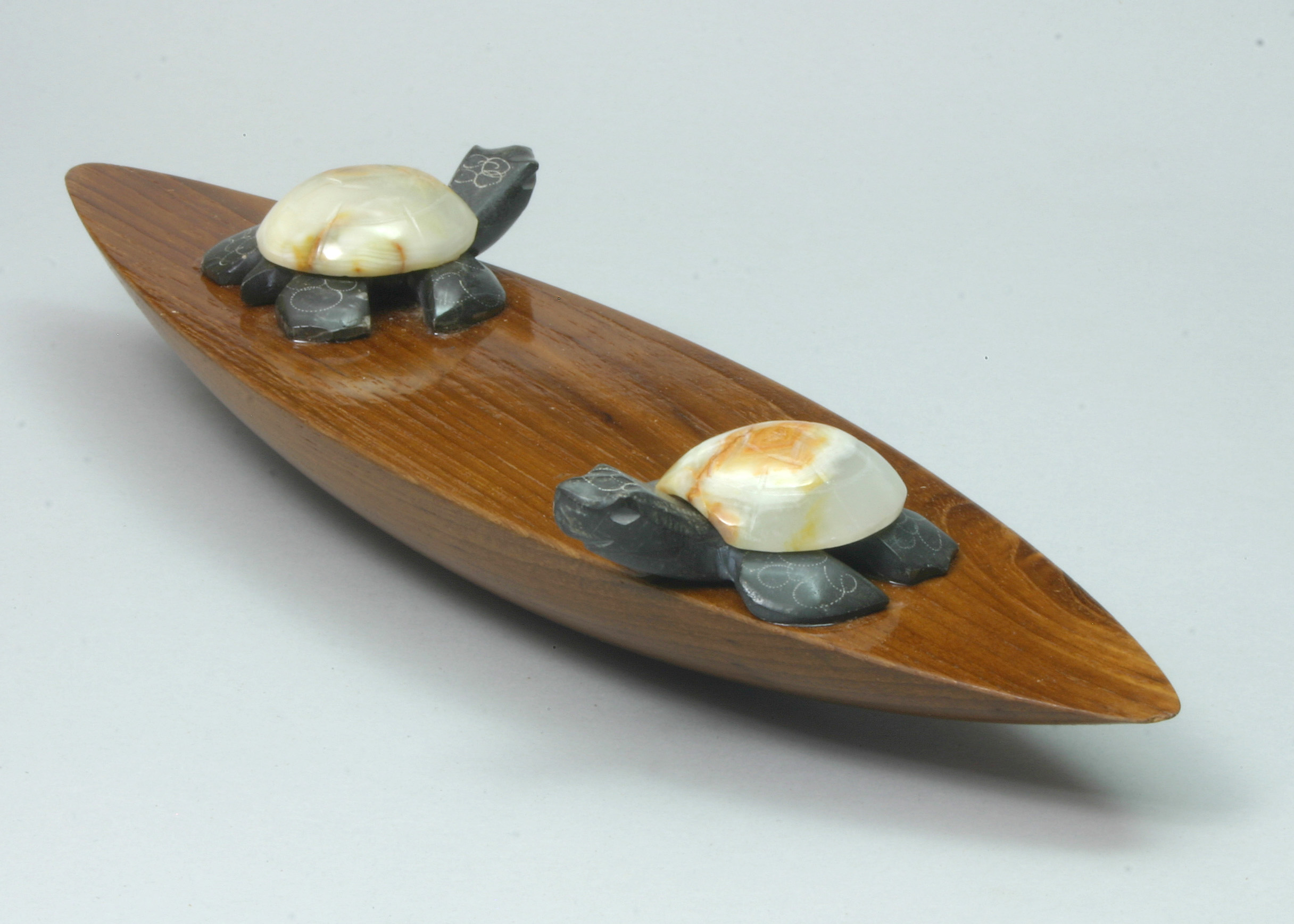
An ornate rattleback

== Global variations ==
=== Africa ===
==== Ghana ====
A top used for alikoto, which is often played in the sand

In Ghana, children play a spinning top game called alikoto. In alikoto, players spin one top each, and the person whose top falls first receives a hit on the hand from the one whose top continues to spin.

==== North Africa ====
Among children in Morocco and Tunisia, three classes of tops have been described: tops made from natural material (such as fruits, nuts, wood, and clay), tops made from waste material (such as bottle caps, jar lids, cans, straws, threads, etc.), and tops made by artisans. In Southeastern Morocco, for example, children make a top called tamzizelt from apricot kernels pierced by reed stems. Amazigh children in North Morocco make a top called trumbi from the cap of a five-liter bottle. A top collected circa 1898 during the Williams Moroccan Expedition is wooden with a metal tip.

==== Sierra Leone ====
A songoi top held in the Sierra Leone National Museum was made by drilling a hole into a palm nut and attaching a stick. A game is played where multiple people spin their tops simultaneously on a mat, and whoever's top knocks down the others' wins.

==== South Africa ====
In South Africa, colorful tops (known as itola in isiXhosa) are sold at spaza shops. Children try to make the tops spin by pulling a string twisted around the top. A trick is picking up the top while it is still in motion.

=== Asia ===
==== China and Taiwan ====
Among ethnic minorities in China, top-spinning is practiced by Yi, Chuang, Wa, Yao, and Miao peoples. Since 1995, top spinning has been featured in the National Traditional Games of Ethnic Minorities. In Yunnan, spinning tops are an important cultural element. The Jinggu and Shuangbai spinning tops are associated with the Yi people, and the Jizong spinning top is associated with the Wa people. In Guizhou, members of the Yao ethnic group compete in gyroscope competitions.

In Tachi, Taoyuan County, a popular top spinning game is played with large, heavy tops. Originally known as chien chien (Chinese: 千千; pinyin: qiānqiān), the game is believed to have originated in the Song dynasty.

==== Japan ====
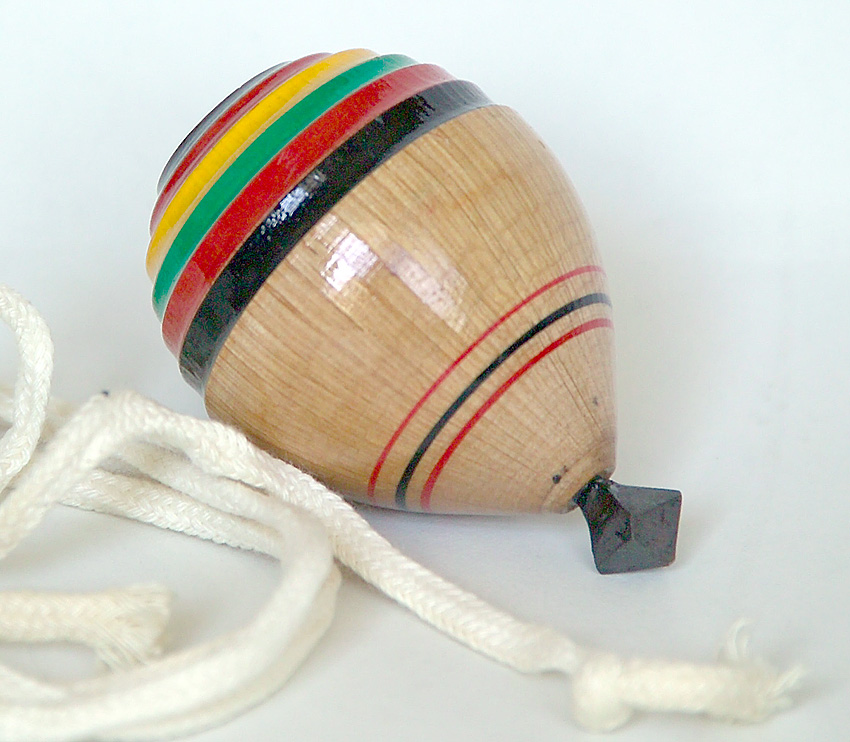
Sasebo koma, a kind of top made in Sasebo, Nagasaki Prefecture

In Japan, some jugglers perform difficult feats with tops, such as spinning a top along the edge of a sword or a wire. The practice of top spinning came to Japan by way of China around 1,200 years ago. Tops were initially not seen as children's toys and were only played with by wealthy people. By the mid-1800s, top spinning was a children's game. Traditional tops include beigoma, a top about three centimeters in diameter (described as "immensely popular from the end of World War II until the 1960s"), and oyama koma, a wooden top spun with a hemp string. Decorative Edo-style tops are carved by artisans and resemble figures that move or dance when spun.

==== Southeast Asia ====
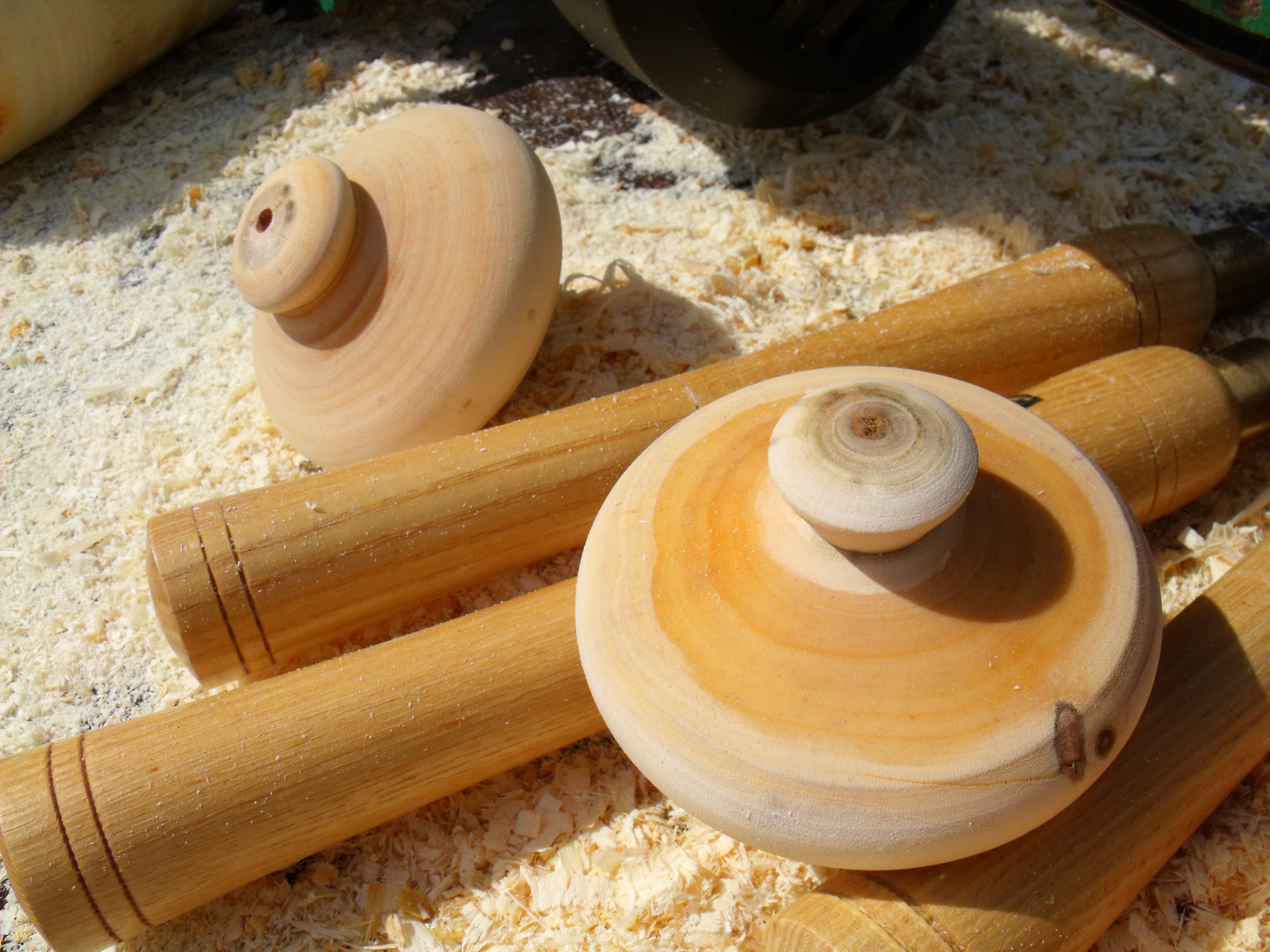
Malay wooden tops

The Malay ethnic group, spread across Malaysia, Singapore and Indonesia, has many traditional types of tops (gasing) differing by build, like the gasing Pahang, gasing Johor, gasing Riau, gasing Melaka and so on.

On the Malay Peninsula's east coast, games are played with peg-tops turned from wood, which are spun with a cord. Top spinning is said to have the status of an adult sport. The tops, which may spin as long as 20 minutes, can be tossed from person to person with wooden paddles. Competitions are undertaken between teams of players; the attacking team's objective is to strike the defending team's tops by casting their own. This is called gasing pangkah, and a Malaysian Gasing Association exists. While fewer games are played and fewer craftsmen make the tops today, there have been signs of revival in recent years.

The game continues to be played, though rarely, in modern Singapore among the older generation. There was a short-lived Singapore Gasing Federation (Fedegasi) in 1979.

==== South Asia ====
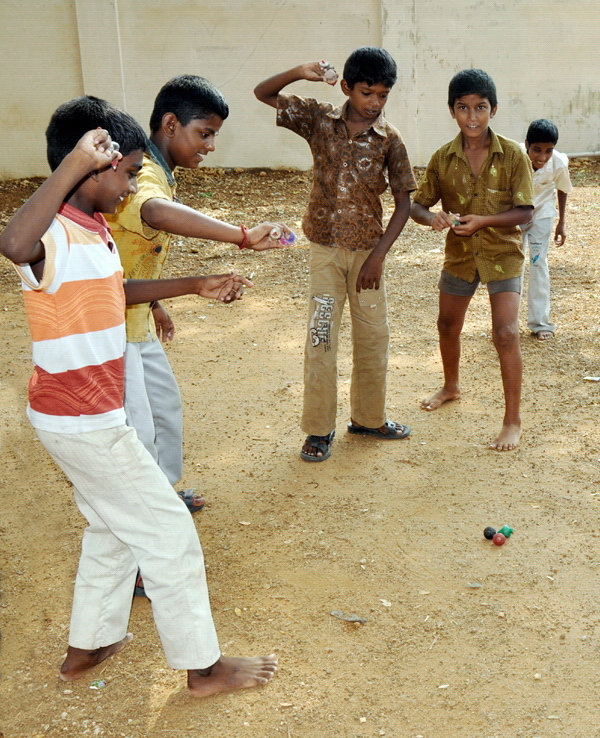
Children playing pambaram

In South India, a game called pambaram is played, in which wooden tops are set spinning by rope. The objective of the game is to see who can spin their top and pick it back up using the rope the quickest. The game is played in a circle, and the tops are shot into the center of the circle. Players try to hit other players' tops to eliminate them. In North India, it is also called Lattoo.

=== Europe ===
==== Czech Republic ====
The káča (pl. káči) was first used in the Czech Republic in historical Bohemia and Moravia as a children's toy during the 17th century. Manufacturers like Detoa Alberechtice still produce káči, implementing colors that blend when spun.

==== England ====
Literary evidence suggests that whip-top spinning was a schoolchild's sport in Elizabethan era England. William Shakespeare, for example, referred to tops in his plays, and a 1591 list of rules from Harrow School forbade play with tops on certain days.

==== Poland ====
In Poland, playing with spinning tops has been a well-spread traditional game among youngsters. Tops have borne their regional names and forms. The most popular names were bączek and fryga. The latter is rooted in culture as part of the popular sayings and was additionally made famous thanks to the Spinning Top sculpture in Szczecin.

=== North America ===
==== Greenland ====
During the Little Ice Age in Greenland, Inuit children played with spinning tops made from whale bone or wood. The shapes, sizes, and thicknesses of these tops varied.

==== United States ====
An engraving of three traditional Lakota whip-tops (can wakiyapi), and whip

Native Americans of the Pueblo tribe had wooden spinning tops. The Oglala Lakota people play with whip-tops called can wakiyapi: a square is marked on the ground or the ice, and players try to whip their top into the square and keep it there.

Tops became widely popular in the 1960s because of promotions by the Duncan Toys Company, which made tops initially from wood painted in various colors, and later from plastic. In 1963 and 1964, Duncan Toys sponsored local competitions which led to grand national finales at Disneyland, California, with a prize of $5,000 USD. These national championships only lasted two years, and the Duncan Toys Company filed for bankruptcy in 1965.

=== Oceania ===
==== Australia ====
Aboriginal Australians used spinning tops prior to the arrival of Europeans. These tops may have developed from whorls, a type of spinning flywheel used to gather plant fibers. The tops varied: they were made of rock, gourds, wood, nuts, beeswax, or clay. In the tropical areas of Australia, spinning tops were made primarily of gourds, as those were locally grown. The tops were usually spun using fingers or palms to twirl them, although some were spun using string made from plant fibers. In one collection of stone tops from the Torres Strait Islands, the tops were large: about 10 to 15 cm (4 to 6 in) in diameter. The bodies of the tops were made of rock in a shape like a bead or lentil, with a long palmwood stick in the middle. On the stone bodies were paintings in red ochre; these depicted people, everyday life, or religion. The stone spinning tops were called kolaps. In another collection, the tops were smaller, about 10 cm (4 in) in diameter, and were made with a body of a gourd instead of stone, with a stick drilled through it and tied together with bark fiber and beeswax. The gourd had holes on its sides, creating a sound when spun. These tops, from a different culture, were called bunbuja. Generally, stone spinning tops were used for competitions between adults, while other types were toys for children.

Spinning tops were popular in the northern islands of Australia, such as the Murray Islands. The natives would engage in top-spinning matches, with the person whose top lasted the longest winning. Some of these tops could spin for almost 30 minutes. In competitions, the tops could be spun on either seashells or ceramics. People of almost all ages participated. Usually, the competitions were broken up into different teams for each section of the island.

Spinning tops were also popular among non-Indigenous Australians. Spinning tops were used as toys for children and teenagers. These wooden tops varied in size and were often painted in patterns of different colors. Some tops also had metal (brass) in them. In the early 2000s, spinning tops were popularized in Australia by large companies such as Moose Toys. Spinning tops are used in school lessons in Australia to teach students about physics.

==== Polynesia ====
An assortment of traditional Māori tops and whip

The Māori of New Zealand have pōtaka made of stone or wood. They are made flat-topped (pōtaka tā) or double-ended (pōtaka kotorerua). Tops spun with a cord are called pōtaka takiri. Small hollow gourds stuck through with a peg were sometimes used as tops. In Tūhoe land, tops were used as part of a war ceremony; after a defeat, many people assembled with pōtaka and spun tops in the marae (meeting place) while singing a song.

Native Hawaiians made small tops or hū from candlenuts.

=== South America ===
==== Bolivia ====
The Indigenous tribe called the Guarayu had spinning tops called tiropo. They were created by hammering a metal nail into wood and then wrapping string around the nail. The tops were spun by throwing it onto the ground while holding onto the string, similar to other spinning tops with string.

Trompos in Chile

==== Chile ====
Trompos were introduced during the Spanish colonial period and became part of folk culture and chilenidad (Chilean identity). National holidays like Fiestas Patrias commonly use trompos, which are featured in traditional games in local fondas.

== Competitions ==
There are many official competitions for top spinning as a sport, such as the U.S. National Championships and the World Championships. During the COVID-19 pandemic, contests were often held online, with contestants submitting videos and participating live via Zoom. The primary international organization that oversees competitive spinning-top games is the International Top Spinners Association. A Beyblade is a popular toy line of battling spinning tops. Both international and local tournaments and competitions have risen in popularity.

== In media ==
A Brazilian stamp depicting a top, 1979

"The Top" (German: Der Kreisel) is a short story by Bohemian writer Franz Kafka. A philosopher attempts to understand the world by trying to grasp a spinning top. He ignores the cries of the children as he interrupts their game.

Rock band The Cure released the album The Top in 1984, named after, and at least partially inspired by, the toy of the same name. A spinning top can be heard at the start of the album's title track. In an interview, Robert Smith described how he spent twelve hours on the floor of the studio, trying to capture the perfect version of the distinctive sound of the toy.

The top is a focal element and metaphysical symbol in the movie Inception (2010), directed by Christopher Nolan and starring Leonardo DiCaprio, even appearing in the final shot.

In 2022, an Armenian-styled spinning top, with the song "Spin the Magic", was chosen as the theme art and the main motif for the 20th edition of Junior Eurovision Song Contest, held in Yerevan, Armenia.

== See also ==
- Bauernroulette
- Children's street culture
- Diabolo
- Fidget spinner
- ForeverSpin
- Gee-haw whammy diddle
- Knucklebones
- Lagrange, Euler, and Kovalevskaya tops
- Paengichigi
