= ForeverSpin =

Canadian manufacturer of metal toy tops

- Type: Private
- Industry: Toy
- Founded: February 2014; 12 years ago
- Founder: Ruben Gonzalez; Viktor Grabovskyy; Cristobal Uribe
- Headquarters: 1 Dundas Street West (#2500), Toronto, Ontario M5G 1Z3, Canada
- Area served: International
- Key people: Ruben Gonzalez; Viktor Grabovskyy; Cristobal Uribe
- Products: Tops and accessories
- Website: foreverspin.com

ForeverSpin is a Canadian company that manufactures metal spinning tops, which have a similar appearance to the top seen in the 2010 film Inception. The company funded the initial manufacture of its tops through crowdfunding campaigns.

== History ==
=== Founding and early years ===
In 2013, Viktor Grabovskyy, Ruben Gonzalez, and Cristobal Uribe planned to start an analytics company, but as they did not have the funding to do so, they decided instead to market a top as a modern piece of nostalgia. They co-founded ForeverSpin together in February 2014, launching their first fundraising campaign on Kickstarter.
