= Rattleback =

Semi-ellipsoidal spinning top

A rattleback in action

A rattleback is a semi-ellipsoidal top which will rotate on its axis in a preferred direction. If spun in the opposite direction, it becomes unstable, "rattles" to a stop and reverses its spin to the preferred direction.

For most rattlebacks the motion will happen when the rattleback is spun in one direction, but not when spun in the other. Some exceptional rattlebacks will reverse when spun in either direction. This counterintuitive behavior makes the rattleback a physical curiosity that has excited human imagination since prehistoric times.

A rattleback may also be known as a "anagyre", "(rebellious) celt", "Celtic stone", "druid stone", "rattlerock", "spin bar", "wobble stone" (or "wobblestone") and by product names including "ARK", "Bizzaro Swirl", "Space Pet" and "Space Toy".

== History ==
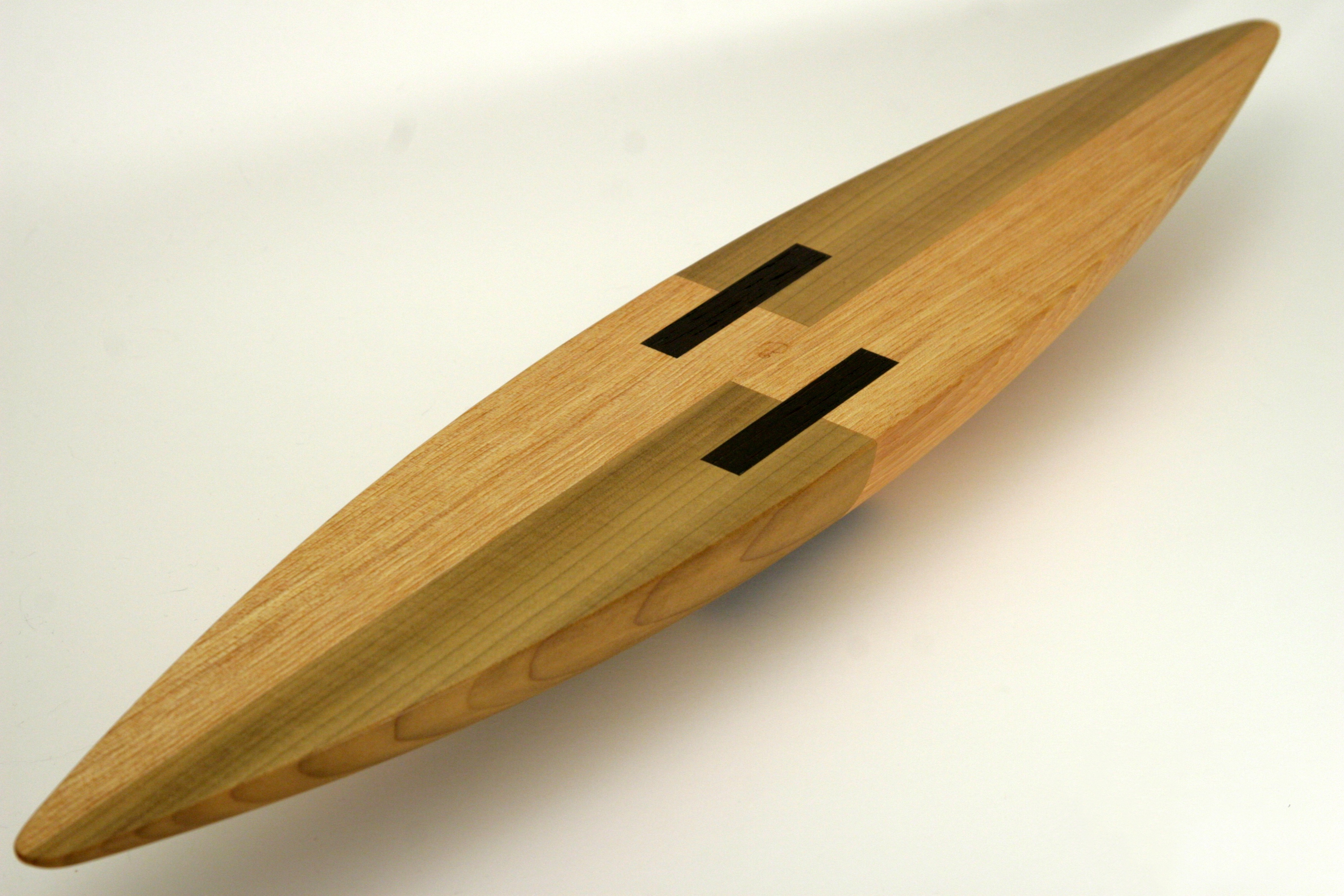
Large rattleback made from different wood densities

Archeologists who investigated ancient Celtic and Egyptian sites in the 19th century found celts which exhibited the spin-reversal motion. The antiquarian word celt (the "c" is soft, pronounced as "s") describes lithic tools and weapons shaped like an adze, axe, chisel, or hoe.

The first modern descriptions of these celts were published in the 1890s when Gilbert Walker wrote his "On a curious dynamical property of celts" for the Proceedings of the Cambridge Philosophical Society in Cambridge, England, and "On a dynamical top" for the Quarterly Journal of Pure and Applied Mathematics in Somerville, Massachusetts, US.

Additional examinations of rattlebacks were published in 1909 and 1918, and by the 1950s and 1970s, several more examinations were made. But, the popular fascination with the objects has increased notably since the 1980s when no fewer than 28 examinations were published.

== Size and materials ==
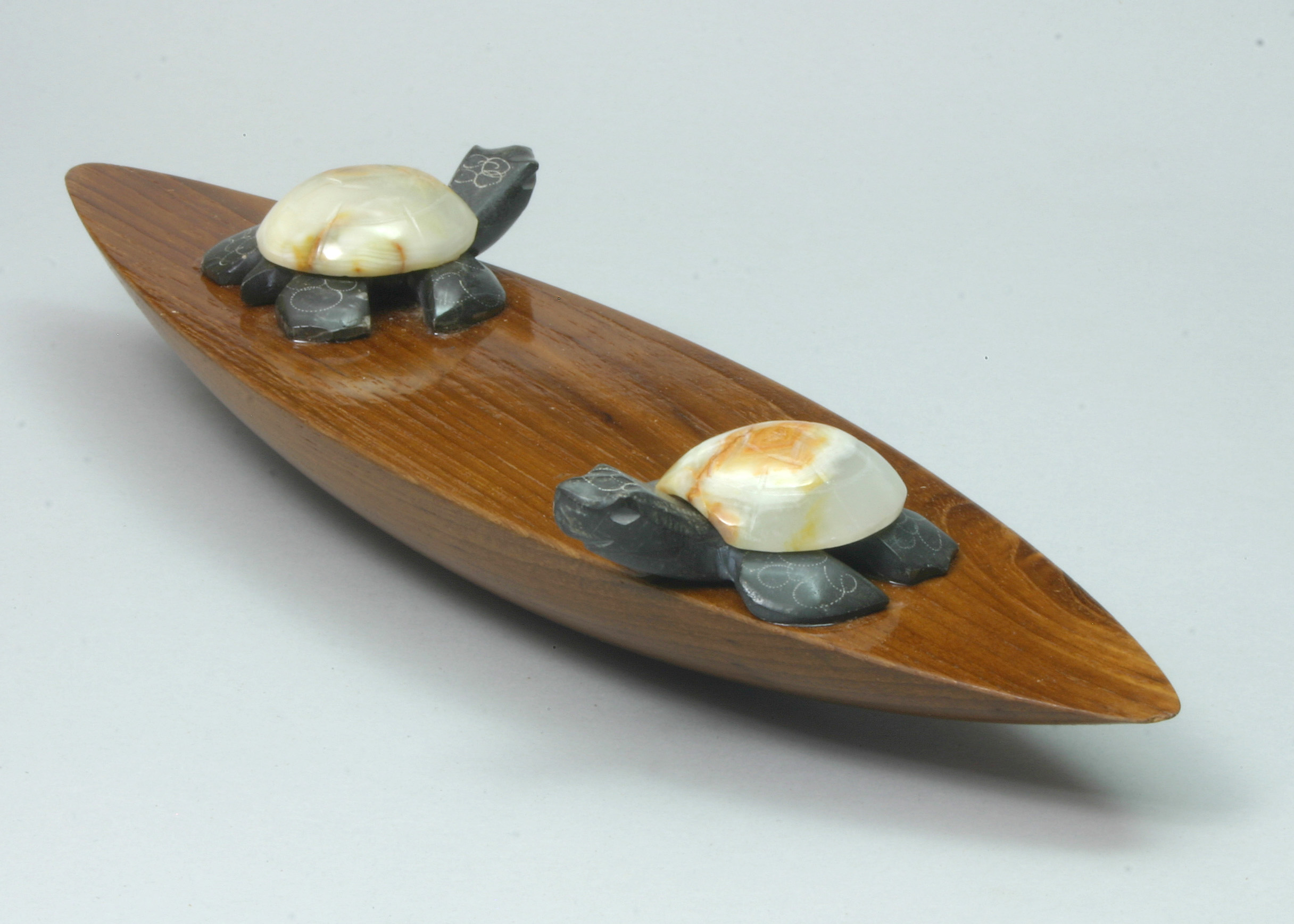
Carved wooden rattleback

Rattleback artifacts are typically stone and come in various sizes. Modern ones sold as novelty puzzles and toys are generally made of plastic, wood, or glass, and come in sizes from a few inches up to 12 inches (300 mm) long. A rattleback can also be made by bending a spoon. Two rattleback design types exist: they have either an asymmetrical base with a skewed rolling axis, or a symmetrical base with offset weighting at the ends.

== Physics ==
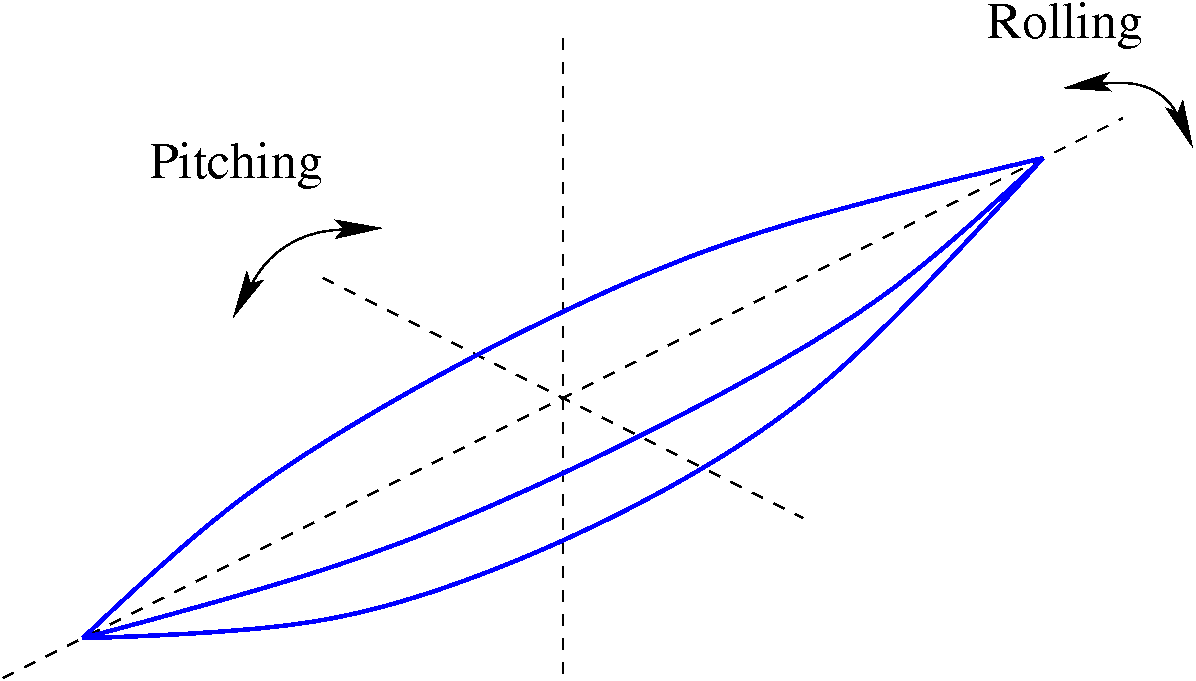
Rolling and pitching motions

The spin-reversal motion follows from the growth of instabilities on the other rotation axes, that are rolling (on the main axis) and pitching (on the crosswise axis).

Rattleback made with spoon exhibiting multiple spin reversals

When there is an asymmetry in the mass distribution with respect to the plane formed by the pitching and the vertical axes, a coupling of these two instabilities arises; one can imagine how the asymmetry in mass will deviate the rattleback when pitching, which will create some rolling.

The amplified mode will differ depending on the spin direction, which explains the rattleback's asymmetrical behavior. Depending on whether it is rather a pitching or rolling instability that dominates, the growth rate will be very high or quite low.

This explains why, due to friction, most rattlebacks appear to exhibit spin-reversal motion only when spun in the pitching-unstable direction, also known as the strong reversal direction. When the rattleback is spun in the "stable direction", also known as the weak reversal direction, friction and damping often slow the rattleback to a stop before the rolling instability has time to fully build. Some rattlebacks, however, exhibit "unstable behavior" when spun in either direction, and incur several successive spin reversals per spin.

Other ways to add motion to a rattleback include tapping by pressing down momentarily on either of its ends, and rocking by pressing down repeatedly on either of its ends.

For a comprehensive analysis of the rattleback's motion, see V. Ph. Zhuravlev and D. M. Klimov (2008). The previous papers were based on simplified assumptions and limited to studying local instability of its steady-state oscillation.

Realistic mathematical modelling of a rattleback is presented by G. Kudra and J. Awrejcewicz (2015). They focused on modelling of the contact forces and tested different versions of models of friction and rolling resistance, obtaining good agreement with the experimental results.

Numerical simulations predict that a rattleback situated on a harmonically oscillating base can exhibit rich bifurcation dynamics, including different types of periodic, quasi-periodic and chaotic motions.

== See also ==
- Spinning top
- Tesla's Egg of Columbus
- Tennis racket theorem
