= Wizzzer =

Gyroscopic top from Mattel

- Type: Top
- Company: Mattel
- Country: United States
- Availability: 1969–
- Official website

The Wizzzer or Wiz-z-zer is a gyrostat toy introduced by Mattel Toymakers in 1969, and introduced the spinning top to modern children. The "twist" (innovation) was the use of a super-spinning, high-tech bearing, that allowed the top to spin at very high speed and remain standing for a long period of time. This top did not rely on a string to attain high speed so it was easier to master than tops of old. Wizzers are not sold as scientific instruments, but may be used to demonstrate the conservation of angular momentum and gyroscope stability.

Here are instructions showing the many ways to use the toy.

Extensive instructions for the Wizzer toy top

== History ==
Wizzzer stationary (left) and spinning (right)

The Wizzzer first appeared in the Mattel Catalog in 1969, with various iterations offered through the early 70s. Mattel used innovative wedge-shaped packaging and gave the tops interesting personas through the use of color combinations and stickers. The most memorable are those named: Spin-Fire, Mach-1, Prowler, Night Winder, Bonehead, Sparkshooter and "The Color Changer" (the last described the Wizzzer's actions rather than having a trademarked name). To expand the line, Mattel added a Wizzzer Hockey Game, the Trick Tray and the Super Competition Set. Several automobile toys were included that were Wizzzer-driven as "Spin-Buggies."

The technology was reused by Mattel as a part of their Upsy Downsy series of toys as vehicles that figures would ride ("Furry Hurry" and "Hairy Hurry"). Two He-Man action figures from the late 80s also reused this technology: Rotar and Twistoid (as a side note, there were plans for a vehicle called "Gyrattacker" that did not make it into production that would power up and launch them).

Wizzzers were marketed by all the major toy stores and also in department store catalogs like Sears, J.C. Penney, Wards and Spiegel in their Christmas Catalogs. Mattel worked with several companies to produce "Canned Wizzzers" – changing the body shape to a can/cylinder. Canned Wizzzers include: Coca-Cola, 7-Up, Pepsi, Hi-C, Hawaiian Punch, Minute Maid, Campbell's Tomato Soup and Bardahl Motor Oil. For the Mattel Anniversary, a special clear "Mattel Logo" Wizzzer was made available to Mattel employees. Special "Mini-Wizzzers" were made available as cereal premiums.

Wizzzers were unavailable for many years then revived first by Mattel then later by Matchbox and Duncan (the Yo-yo company). A more recent appearance was in the McDonald's Happy Meal Chicken Little toy, available October 28 – November 22, 2005. Two vehicles are driven by wizzzer figures, with each figure built on a wizzzer. The bearing is struck and then the figure is placed into his vehicle, which drives the vehicle forward.

The most recent incarnation of the toy is the 2016-17 remake from the vintage toy company called "Super Impulse". 8 styles are offered, 4 being the familiar spherical shape, and 4 of the 1960s "hot air balloon" shape.
