= Spinning Top (sculpture) =

Modernist art piece in Szczecin, Poland

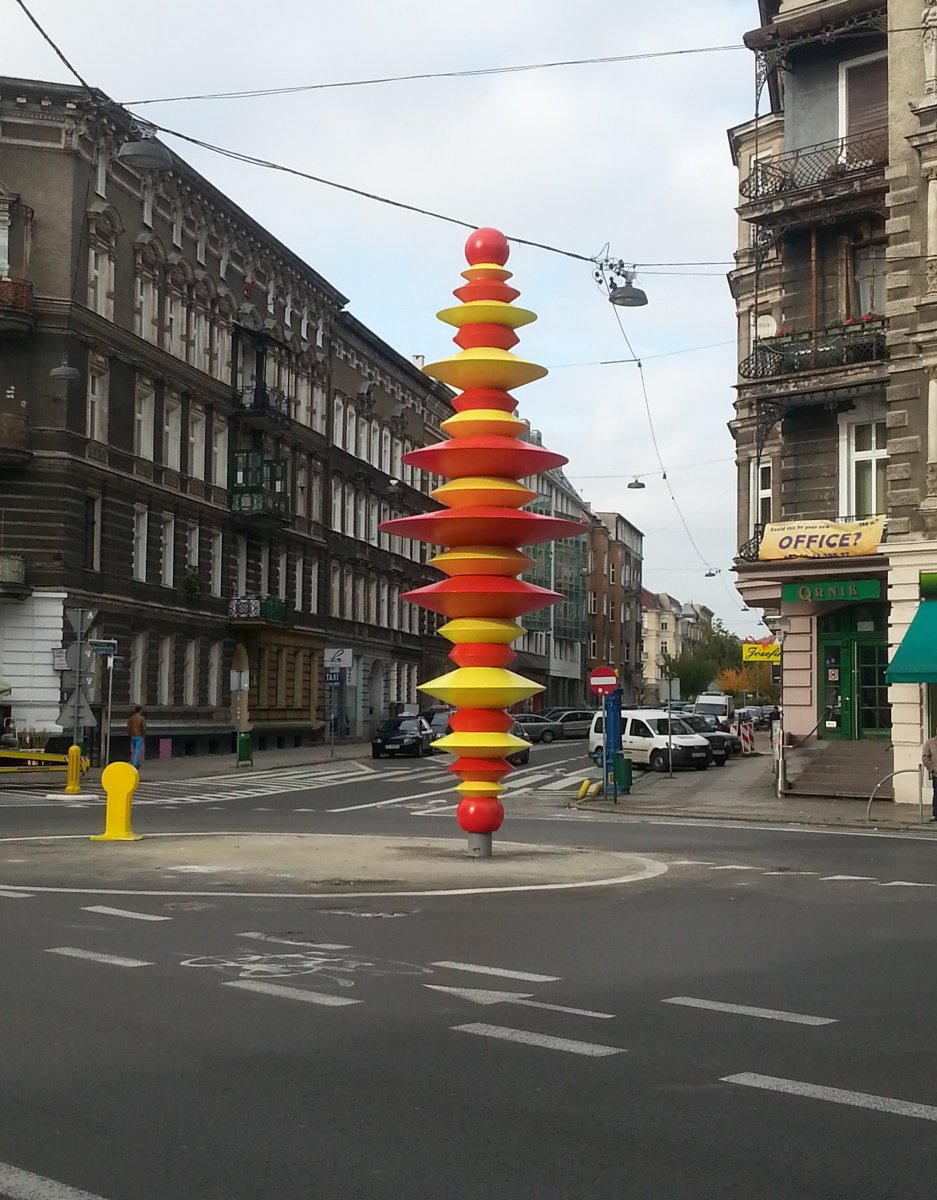
- The sculpture in 2015.
- Interactive map of Spinning Top
- Coordinates: 53.431121°N 14.544824°E
- Designer: Maurycy Gomulicki
- Type: Sculpture
- Material: Polymer concrete
- Opening date: 22 October 2015
- Dismantled date: 18 December 2016

The Spinning Top (Polish: Fryga, colloquially also Bączek) was a modernist sculpture in Szczecin, Poland, placed at the Ludwik Zamenhof Square. It was located within the neighbourhood of Centre in the Downtown district. It was designed by Maurycy Gomulicki, and unveiled on 22 October 2015. Due to a manufacturing error, it began quickly deteriorating, and following unsuccessful repair attempts, it was ultimately removed on 18 December 2016. The sculpture had a form of several polymer concrete rings, stacked vertically on a metal pole, alternating between red and yellow.

== History ==
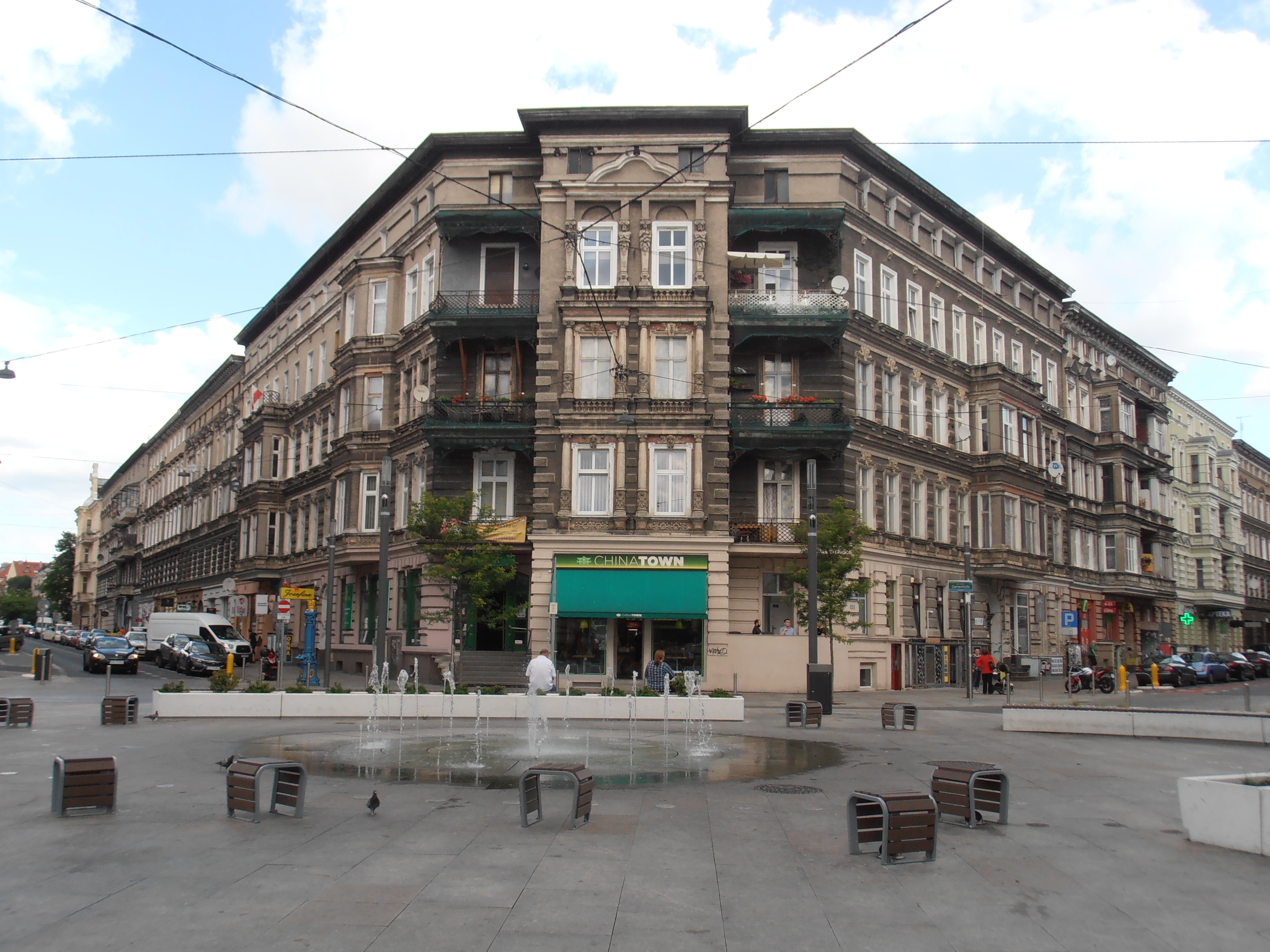
The Zamenhof Square in 2018, the former location of the Spinning Top.

The Spinning Top was the first sculpture commissioned by the Dom Kultury 13 Muz community centre in Szczecin, as part of the Project Monumento, which envisioned that each year there would unveiled one modernist sculpture in the city. It was designed by artist Maurycy Gomulicki, and manufactured by company PanKreator. It cost 200,000 Polish złoties.

The sculpture was unveiled on 22 October 2015, in the centre the Ludwik Zamenhof Square, then a roundabout at the intersection of Jagielońska, Księcia Bogusława X, Monte Cassino, and Rayskiego Streets. It had a form of 19 short and wide rings with sharp edges, and varying diameters. They were made from polymer concrete, and stacked vertically on a metal pole, alternating between red and yellow colour. On both of its ends were placed small red spherical rings. The sculpture was inspired by a spinning top toy. Upon its unveiling it was criticised for its design, as well as for its bright and colourful scheme clashing with dark Art Nouveau façades of surrounding it tenements.

In the following weeks, due to the manufacture error, the sculpture begun to crack and fall apart, and eventually was at risk of losing its structural integrity. Following the unsuccessful attempts at its repair, it was removed on 18 December 2016. During the process, eight of it rings fell apart, and the central pole broke. It remains were stored in the warehouse owned by the Szczecin Road and Public Transport Administration. Additionally, the city has cancelled the Project Monumento as the result of the Spinning Top failure.

Dom Kultury 13 Muz, which commissioned the sculpture had sued the manufacturer, PanKreator, for the money paid to them for its manufacture, and was awarded it by the court in 2022.
