= Celt (tool) =

Prehistoric tool

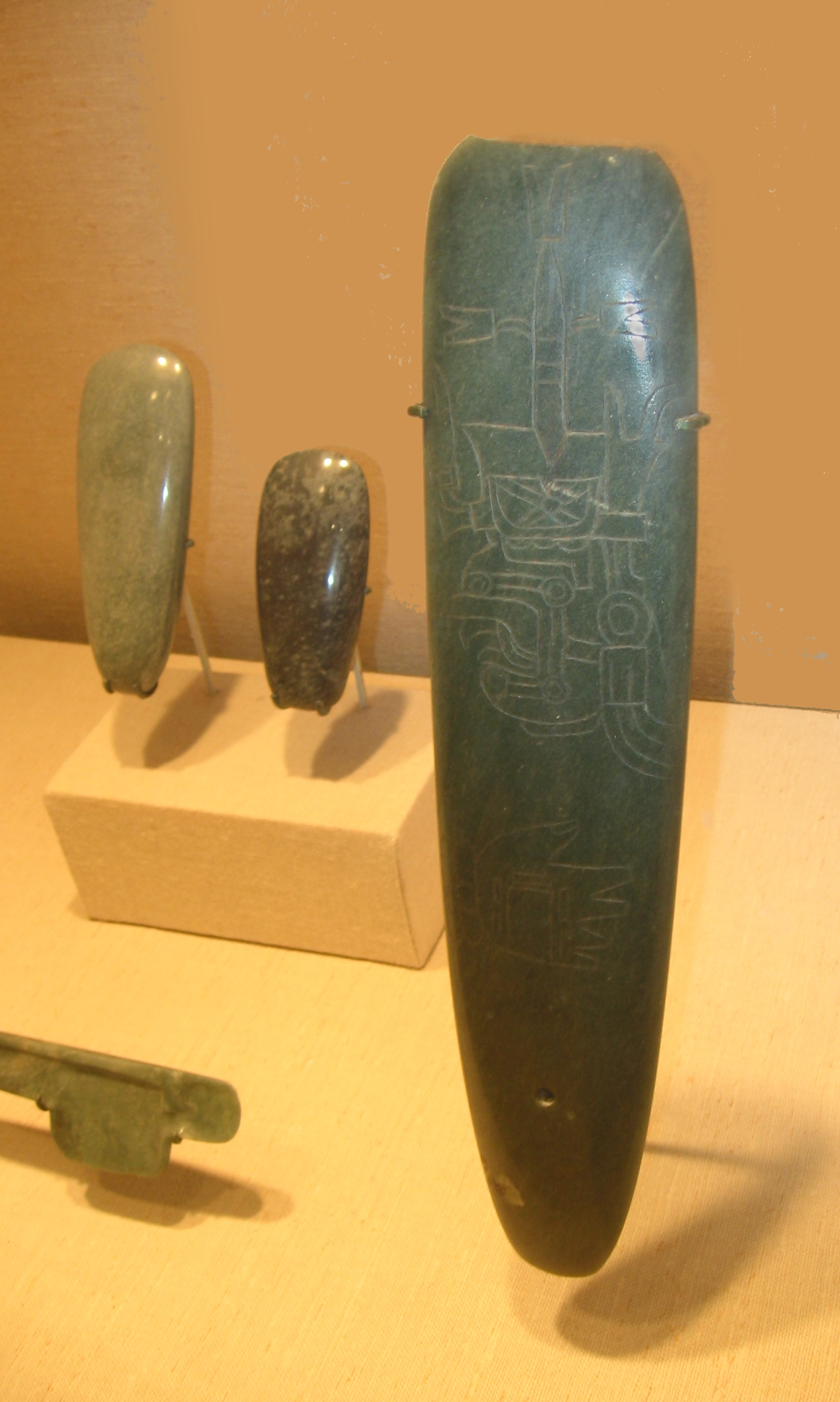
Three Olmec celts. The one in the foreground is incised with an image of an Olmec figure.

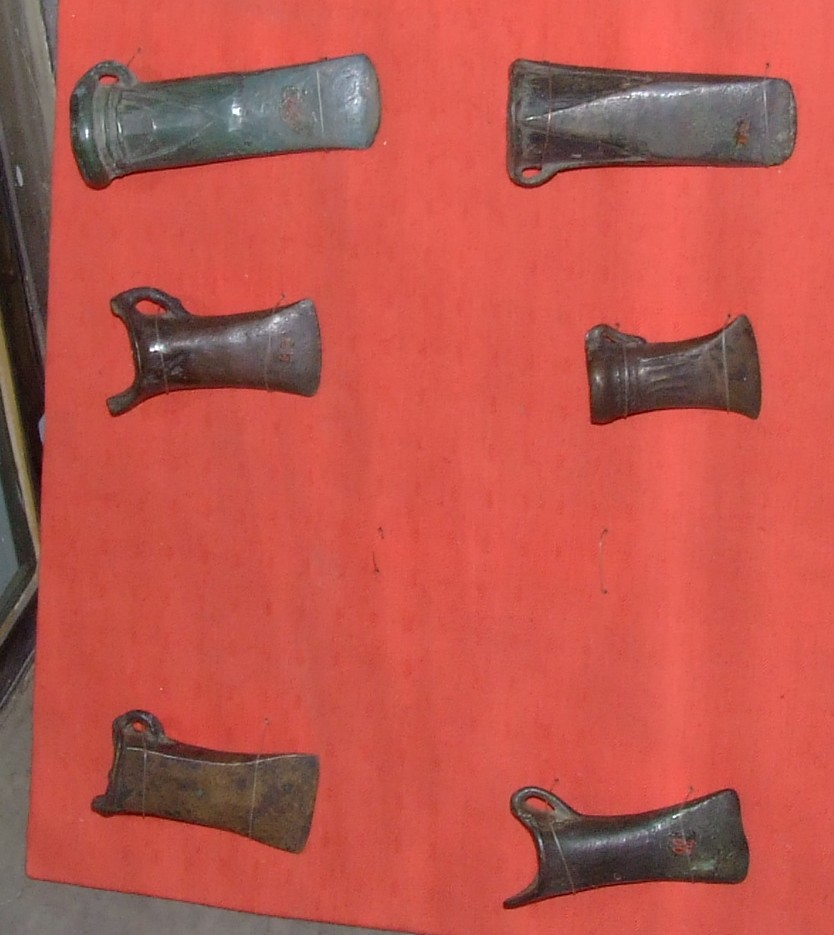
Celts from Transylvania

In archaeology, a celt /sɛlt/ is a long, thin, prehistoric, stone or bronze tool similar to an adze, hoe, or ax.

A shoe-last celt was a polished stone tool used during the early European Neolithic for felling trees and woodworking.

== Etymology ==
The term "celt" seems to have come about from a copyist's error in many medieval manuscript copies of Job 19:24 in the Latin Vulgate Bible, which became enshrined in the authoritative Sixto-Clementine printed edition of 1592. Where all earlier versions (the Codex Amiatinus, for example) have vel certe (the Latin for 'but surely'), the Sixto-Clementine has vel celte. The Hebrew has לעד (lā‘aḏ) at this point, which means 'forever'. The editors of the Oxford English Dictionary "[incline] to the belief that celtis was a phantom word", simply a misspelling of certe. However, some scholars over the years have treated celtis as a real Latin word.

From the context of Job 19:24 ("Oh, that my words were inscribed with an iron tool on lead, or engraved in rock forever!"), the Latin word celte was assumed to be some kind of ancient chisel. Eighteenth-century antiquarians, such as Lorenz Beger, adopted the word for the stone and bronze tools they were finding at prehistoric sites; the OED suggests that a "fancied etymological connexion" with the prehistoric Celts assisted its passage into common use.

== See also ==
- Hapax legomenon – Word appearing only once in a text or record
- Palstave – European Bronze Age axe
- Rattleback – Semi-ellipsoidal spinning top
