= Pambaram =

Spinning top from the Indian subcontinent

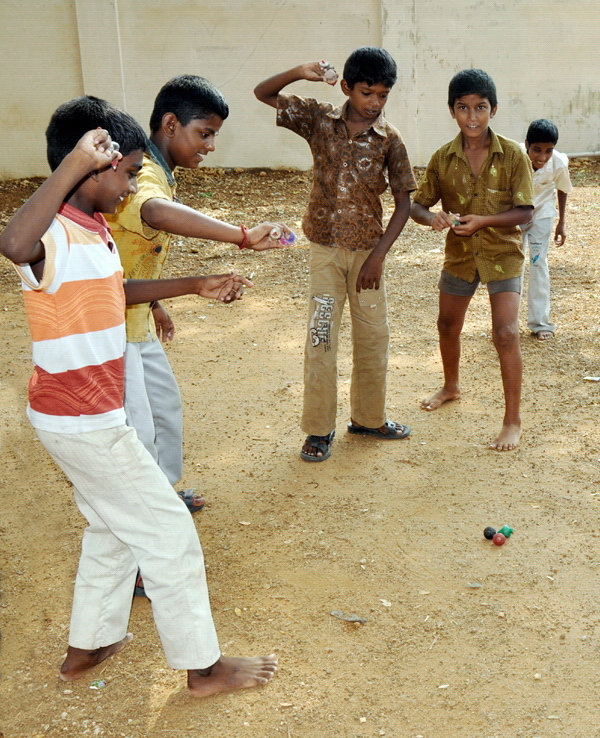
Children playing Pambaram

Pambaram is a traditional throwing top game played in India and Bangladesh.

== See also ==
- Gasing pangkah
- Yo-yo
