= Bauernroulette =

Board game

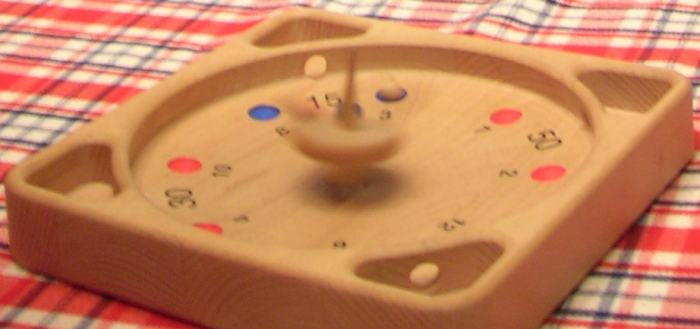
An older version of the game with four "bowls" on the outside. Some modern versions may have eight.

Bauernroulette is a game that was apparently invented in Germany, where several companies sell it. The name Bauernroulette indicates it is a "poor man's roulette", since Bauer is German for peasant, farmer or agricultural laborer.

In the game, a spinning top is spun in the middle of a wooden circular playing surface that contains six wooden balls. The balls bounce off the top in random directions and sometimes land within one of several hollow indentations within the surface, or pass through a small hole into chambers that are located outside the spinning surface area. Typically, the most points are scored by landing balls within these outer chambers. Skilled players are often able to spin the top such that it remains in motion for more than thirty seconds.

== Rules ==
1. Place the 6 balls (4 white, 1 red, and 1 green) in the center of the playing field.
2. Set the whipping top near them and spin it.
3. The balls will be shot into the small hollows or bowls.
4. Each hollow or bowl in which the balls come to rest have a point value associated with them. Add up the points of each of the hollows in which a ball has come to rest.
5. If the red ball is in a hollow, double the number of points for that ball.
6. If the green ball is in a hollow, the points are subtracted from the sum obtained by the other 5 balls.
7. Sometimes balls will fly out of the playing surface. These balls are out for that round and can not be replaced while the top is still spinning.
8. A player scoring with all 6 balls gets to spin the top again.
9. The winner is the player who first reaches a point total that is agreed upon before the game. Normally this total is 1000 points.

=== Alternative rule ===
The players can also stipulate that the score reached by the green and white balls is valid only if the red one also scores.
