= Paengichigi =

Korean game

Paengichigi (Korean: 팽이치기) is a traditional Korean game primarily played during the winter and is enjoyed by people of all ages. Paengichigi is played by using a spinning top and a stick with a long string. The spinning tops are wound up with twine and then let go. Players must keep hitting the spinning top with the string tuck and the stick to make it rotate for as long as possible.

One of the popular locations to experience traditional games like paengichigi is Namsangol Hanok Village.

== Production ==
The spinning tops are traditionally made from types of wood that are easy to carve or have a hard and dense grain, such as paulownia, hackberry, birch, and jujube. In some instances, materials like bricks or roof tiles are used as alternatives to wood. More recently, steel components, such as bearings, have also been used to create spinning tops.

Using a sickle and a saw, a cylindrical tree is cut to the appropriate size, then shaped into various forms to create a spinning top. The bottom of the top traditionally had a cone shape, but during the Japanese colonial period, nails and small iron balls were introduced at the pointed ends to enhance the spinning performance. The upper part of the top was often decorated with taegeuk patterns drawn using ink or paint.

It is essential to ensure even balance across the top, bottom, and left and right sides when carving the top. An unbalanced top tends to fall quickly due to severe wobbling, whereas a well-balanced top can spin steadily in one place for an extended time without shaking.

In paengichigi, it is common to spin the top while striking the torso. The string is wrapped around the upper portion of the top a few times and then pulled off while placing the top on the ground to initiate a slow spin. A stick is used to strike the top with increasing strength, gradually accelerating its rotation until it reaches peak speed.

This competitive game, often referred to as a "top fight", includes various techniques and challenges such as long spins, long throws, quick returns, bumps, and stews.

- Long Spin: Players compete to see whose top spins the longest. After a certain spin duration, one top strikes another, and the winner is the one whose top continues spinning longer.
- Strike Away: Players aim to keep their tops upright on a pre-drawn line and, at a signal, strike them as hard as possible. The winner is determined by whose top spins the furthest and for the longest time.
- Quick Return: This involves racing tops from the starting point to another predetermined point, with the winner being the one whose top reaches the target fastest.
- Bump Back: In this method, the top is spun to hit an obstacle at a specific point. The winner is the player whose top returns and continues spinning for the longest time.
- Janggu Top: This involves spinning the top for an extended duration while alternately pushing the opponent's top to gain an advantage.

== History ==
According to the Nihon Shoki ("The Chronicles of Japan"), written in 720 AD (or the 19th year of King Seongdeok of Silla), this game arrived in Japan from China through the Silla Kingdom of Korea. This indicates its popularity during the Three Kingdoms period of Korea. Historical records, having paengichigi in the work of King Sukjong of the Joseon period, and Hancheongmungam (漢淸文鑑) written in the Joseon dynasty.

The term paengichigi derived from the appearance of an object turning Bingbing or Pingping, Bongae, Bangae (Hamgyeongdo), is also known as Pye, Pengdol, Puli, Pengsaeng, and Poae.

The top is a traditional play tool for children to play with a round piece of wood whetted at one end, and the string is wrapped around the body and then rotated while unwinding.

== Types of paengichigi ==
Paengi (top) was spelt pingi (핑이) before, and the word Pingi appears to be a derivative of Pingping, describing spinning movements. Depending on the region, the top is called Peng (South Gyeongsang Province), Pingding (North Gyeongsang Province), Pengdol (South Jeolla Province), Doraegi (Jeju).

There are several types of paengi:

- Malpaengi (말팽이): a top resembling corn with a pointed tail;
- Janggupaengi (장고팽이): a top that has pointed tails on both sides;
- Sangsuripaengi (상수리팽이): a top with a pointed rod inserted through an acorn.
- Julpaengi (줄팽이): a top with a narrow groove in the middle and the janggu top is a top made by sharply shaving both the right and top ends to turn toward the side. The whip is made by binding the bark of tree roots cut into thin pieces to a narrow crack at the end of a stick. It can also be made of durable cloth, silk thread, twine, or leather.

== Playing methods ==
This game can be played by two or more players or individually. In a competition, the aim is to keep the top spinning as long as possible, while one participant tries to knock over the other spin top with his own. An ice-covered stretch of a house yard or a neighbourhood alley acts as a venue for the game of paengichigi. A frozen river, pond or rice paddy are good alternatives as well.

There are some methods of playing the game such as:

- Long run:- Players spin the top by striking it with all their strength, but when the signal goes off, they stop hitting the top.
- Hit the top:- After turning the top, it bumps into the opponent's top. The side that falls first loses.
- Send away:-The winner is the one who hits the top at the starting line and sends it the furthest.
- Come back quickly:-The player who hits the top and goes to the target point and returns the fastest wins.
- Enduring:- The top that runs for a long time without stopping after hitting a large stone or wall wins.

=== The scientific principles behind the top ===
While hitting the top, it turns at an angle at first, but soon becomes balanced. When the top is about to stop, after hitting it with the top and giving it a rotational force, it spins again. The reason behind the top not falling and rotating is due to the rotational inertia. The power of the spinning top keeps the top balanced.

The top turned by hand transmits kinetic energy to the top, causing it to rotate. The kinetic energy of the spinning top is converted into thermal energy by bottom friction. The top revolves longer by minimizing the conversion of the rotating force into heat.
