= Bay (disambiguation) =

A bay is an area of water bordered by land on three sides.

Bay, Bays, baying, or The Bay may also refer to:

== Places ==
=== China ===
- Bay County or Baicheng County, Aksu Prefecture, Xinjiang Uyghur Autonomous Region

=== France ===
- Bay, Haute-Saône, a commune

=== Philippines ===
- Bay, Laguna, a municipality
- Bay River

=== Somalia ===
- Bay, Somalia

=== United Kingdom ===
- Bay, Dorset, an area of Gillingham, England
- Bay, Highland, a location in Scotland

=== United States ===
- Bay, Arkansas
- Bay, Springfield, Massachusetts, a neighborhood
- Bay, Missouri
- Bay County, Florida
- Bay County, Michigan
- Bays, Kentucky
- Bays, Ohio
- San Francisco Bay Area, California, a metropolitan area often referred to as just "the Bay"

== Animals and plants ==
=== Animals ===
- Bay (horse), a color of the hair coats of some horses
- Baying, a kind of howling made by canines

=== Plants ===
- Bay laurel, the evergreen laurel tree species Laurus nobilis
- Bay leaf, the aromatic leaves of several species of the Laurel family
- Rose bay, a common name for Rhododendron maximum

== Architecture and interior design ==
- Bay (architecture), a module in classical or Gothic architecture
- Bay, the name in English of a ken, a Japanese unit of measure and proportion
- Bay window, a window space projecting outward from the main walls of a building and forming a bay in a room
- Bay (shelving), a basic unit of library shelving

== Arts, entertainment, and media ==
=== Radio stations ===
- Bay Radio (Malta), a radio station located in Malta
- Bay Radio (Spain), a radio station serving the Valencian Community in Spain
- Heart North Lancashire & Cumbria, formerly The Bay, a radio station in North West England
- Hot Radio, originally operating as The Bay 102.8, a radio station in Dorset, England,
- Easy Radio, formerly Swansea Bay Radio, a radio station in South Wales
- WLVX, a classic rock radio station, operating as 100.7 The Bay, in Westminster, Maryland
- Bay FM (Japan), a radio station in Chiba Prefecture, Japan

=== Other arts, entertainment, and media ===
- The Bay (film), a 2012 American found footage horror film
- The Bay (web series), a soap opera web series that premiered in 2010
- "The Bay", a 2011 single by Metronomy
- The Bay (TV series), a British crime drama
- Bays (album), a 2015 album by Fat Freddy's Drop

== Businesses ==
- Bank of Ayudhya, a Thai commercial bank (Stock symbol: BAY)
- Bay Networks, a network hardware vendor acquired by Nortel Networks in 1998
- Bay Trading Company, a retailer of woman's clothes in the UK
- Hudson's Bay (department store) or The Bay, a chain of department stores in Canada

== Transport ==
- Baia Mare Airport in Baia Mare, Romania
- Bay platform, a dead-end platform at a railway station which has through lines
- Bay station, a subway station in Toronto
- Bayswater railway station, Melbourne
- Bay, the space enclosed by a set of struts on a biplane (see Biplane § Overview)
- Loading bay, a synonym for loading dock

== People ==
- Bay (chancellor), a royal scribe to an ancient Egyptian ruler
- Bay (surname)
- Bay Buchanan (born 1948), a prominent American conservative political commentator

== Other uses ==
- Bay (cloth), a coarse woolen cloth similar to Baize but lighter in weight and with shorter pile
- Drive bay, an area for adding hardware in a computer
- Sick bay, nautical term for the location in a ship that is used for medical purposes
- The Bay School of San Francisco, a private high school
- Substation bay, an interconnection of equipment in an electrical substation

== See also ==
- Category:Lists of bays
- Bay Area (disambiguation)
- Bay breeze (disambiguation)
- Bay Bridge (disambiguation)
- Bay City (disambiguation)
- Bay School (disambiguation)
- Bay Street (disambiguation)
- Bay Township (disambiguation)
- Baye (disambiguation)
- Bae (disambiguation)
- Bays (disambiguation)
- Bey (disambiguation)
- eBay
