= Bayarri =

Bayarri or Bayerri is a surname. One theory of its origin is that it is derived from the Catalan names Bayer or Bayés, which may in turn refer to Bayeux in northwestern France. An alternative theory is that it is a Basque name, derived from a place in Álava in northeast Spain, a historic Basque territory.

It is the surname of:

- Enrique Galán Bayarri (b. 1946), Spanish footballer
- Josep Maria Bayarri i Hurtado (1886–1970), Spanish writer and poet
- Julio Iricibar Bayarri (b. 1993), Spanish footballer
- M. J. Bayarri (1956–2014), Spanish statistician
