= Baye =

Baye may refer to:

== People ==
- Baye (name)

== Places ==
- Baye, Finistère, France
- Baye, Marne, France
- Baye, Kayes, Mali
- Baye, Mopti, Mali

== See also ==
- Bay (disambiguation)
- Bayes (disambiguation)
- M'baye
