= Bey (disambiguation) =

Bey is an Ottoman and Turkish term for a tribal chieftain and Islamic official; the leader of a beylik.

Bey or BEY may also refer to:

== Places ==
- Bey, Ain, a commune in France
- Bey, Saône-et-Loire, a commune in France
- Bey-sur-Seille, a commune in the Meurthe-et-Moselle, France
- Bəyi or Bey, a village in Azerbaijan
- Beirut Rafic Hariri International Airport (IATA: BEY)

== People ==
- Bey (surname)
- Queen Bey, a nickname for American singer Beyoncé

== Other uses ==
- a title of nobility under Muhammad Ali of Egypt and his dynasty ranking below Pasha and above Effendi
- The diminutive for the spinning tops Beyblade and Beigoma
- Bond equivalent yield

== See also ==
- Bay (disambiguation)
- Bei (disambiguation)
- Beg (disambiguation), alternative form of the Turkic title
