= Gimma (rapper) =

- Also known as: DMB
- Born: Gian-Marco Schmid
- Origin: Chur, Graubünden, Switzerland
- Genre: Hip hop
- Years active: 1999–present

Gimma, real name Gian-Marco Schmid, is a Swiss rapper from Chur in Graubünden Canton who raps in Swiss German.

== Biography ==
Gimma's youth was marked by many traumatic incidents. He was admitted into a psychiatric institution when his parents divorced after twenty years of marriage. This was the main factor leading to his eventual expulsion from Gymnasium due to fights and drug issues.

During secondary school he sold his first rap tapes in the schoolyard. His graduation from secondary school was however hindered by medical problems as well. Doctors found a tumor in his brain that took seven hours in the operating room to remove. Due in part to the operation and his other difficulties, Gimma exhibited behavioral problems. Three years later he went through intensive psychotherapy again due to drug addiction.

Gimma was finally able to complete secondary school in 1996 and entered a Franciscan cloister. While there, Gimma fell in love, so he left the cloister and began an apprenticeship at Calanda Bräu, which he completed successfully after another round of psychotherapy.

In 1999, Gimma announced the project "Blodelprojekt TAO" without permission from his groupmates, a project which Rennie und Stimpee Kutz of the Sektion Kuchikäschtli were also involved in. The next year he toured outside of the country for the first time as a support act for High & The Mighty and Cage Kennylz. At this time he also began to work in an institution where his half brother had previously committed suicide.

Gimma works as a social worker in Chur. He and his team support the youth of Chur with hobby rooms, music clubs, etc.

== General ==
Gimma belongs to the Bauers collective. The groups Luut & Tüütli, X-Chaibä and Breitbild as well as Sektion Kuchikäschtli are the flagship members of the successful collective. He is also a founding member of the rap group OBK (Oschtblock Kuabuaba, Eastern Bloc Cowboys). He has also used the pseudonyms DJ Ammig, Partydiktator and Fabrizio Risiko. His most recent rap project is called "Die 3 hässlichen Vögel". Bern rappers Baze and Ali de Bengali are the other members.

He has a tattoo on the left side of his neck that reads veritas odium parit (truth begets hatred).

Gimma sometimes is known by the name "Flitzer" (streaker) in the Swiss hip-hop scene because he once took off his clothes on stage and continued to perform naked during a performance at the dome in Basel.

== Success ==
The album I gega d'Schwiiz spent 29 weeks in the Swiss album charts and debuted at #13. One of his singles, "Hymna," which became the official song of the Swiss World Cup soccer team, debuted at #6 on the Swiss singles charts. Another successful single was "Superschwiizer." In 2007, Gimma signed a major deal with his crew, "OBK." Along with Gimma, the rappers Ali de Bengali, Damos, Hyphen, Cigi, LIV, SBS, Orange, DJ Fat Freedom, DJ Chronex und Lou Geniuz are members of "OBK." In November 2007, their first single on a major label will be released, the name of which is not yet known.

== Discography ==
=== Albums ===
- 2001 Droga, Sex, Gwalt, Rap (EP)
- 2002 Wissa Müll (EP)
- 2005 Mis Leba isch so Scheisse (EP)
- 2006 I gega d'Schwiiz
- 2007 Panzer
- 2009 Hippie
- 2010 Unmensch
- 2011 Mensch si
- 2016 Megaschwiizer

=== Singles ===
- 2006 Superschwiizer (a One shot (music video))
- 2006 Hymna
- 2006 Iisziit
- 2007 Links, Rechts
- 2007 Hol dr an Politiker
- 2007 Chef vo dr Schwiiz
- 2009 Iar sind alles Hippies

=== Collaborations and other releases ===
- 1999 TAO - Planet Strengelbach (EP)
- 2000 TAO - "z'zweita allai" (Vinyl EP)
- 2001 OBK "Pump dä scheiss uf" (Vinyl EP)
- 2003 Britney's Beer's (Split Single Vinyl)
- 2003 Dr letschti Dreck (EP)
- 2004 OBK "Neu: d'wohrheit! (Mix tape)
- 2005 QRCT Mixtape (Mix tape)
- 2005 Skandal (EP with Skafari)
- 2006 OBK "No meh Wohrheit" (Mix tape)
- 2008 "Trio Eugster - Viva la Grisha (jetzt muess de Buuch weg)" official site: http://www.bira.ch
- 2008 America is Back (LP)
