= Spin Fighters =

Die-cast metal top toys

Spin Fighters is a brand of die-cast metal spinning top toys manufactured by Bandai in China from 1993 to 1997. The tops are loaded into launchers, which are then tightly wound and released to launch the tops onto a flat surface. Players launch their tops into each other with the goal of making their opponent's top fall first. Spin Fighters tops were produced with pictures of characters from media franchises such as WWE and Mighty Morphin Power Rangers.

== See also ==
- Battling Tops
- Beyblade
