= Spinja =

Spinjas is a ratcheted spinning top game created by Tomy and distributed in North America by Parker Brothers in the late 1980s. The game set was sold as a Battle Stadium plastic arena with two Power Winder launchers and two Spinja characters enclosed within the arena, which doubles as a storage case. More characters, launchers, and an oversized playing arena were also made available separately. The objective of the game, similar to Beyblades, is to load your chosen character into the ratcheting launcher and each player would launch their top into the arena at the same time. The tops would ricochet off each other until only one remained spinning or within the arena and that player was declared the winner. Unlike Beyblades, the tops are not customizable and are not associated with any other licensed properties.

== Characters ==
Spinjas consist of two teams: The Eliminators and The Dread Force; these two warring factions carry out their battles at the Earth's core.

The Eliminators are led by Emperor Gar and his lieutenant, Champion Shotgun. Two groups report to Champion Shotgun: a) The Fire Knights (red) which consist of Volcano, Nightmare, and Iron Top; and b) The Ice Knights (blue) which consist of Trident, Whipshot, and Blowgun.

The Dread Force are ruled by King Dethblo and his "right-hand mutant", Champion Switchblade. They also have two groups known as The Muckers (yellow) which include Bludgeon, Butcher, and Odor; and The Rotters (green) which is made up of the characters Sloth, Slug, and Maggot.

Each team also has a group of four "Stalkers", which act as spies for their respective leaders. Emperor Gar's Stalkers consist of Tangle, Scorcher, Gash, and Blud; while King Dethblo's Stalkers are Mangle, Blowtorch, Klaw, and Gore.

There are a total of 24 characters in the game. The Eliminators and The Dread Force can be distinguished from one another by the colors of their spinning-tips. The Eliminators are steel-tipped and The Dread Force are brass-tipped. Each character is unique and has a slightly different spin due to weight distribution differences.

Spinjas have been re-released in Australia as WWE Spinjas, with different characters, but the same premise and equipment of an arena, and two spinners.

== See also ==
- Beyblade
- Battling Tops
