= List of KochiKame: Tokyo Beat Cops manga volumes =

The following is a list of chapters of the long-running manga series KochiKame: Tokyo Beat Cops. Written and illustrated by Osamu Akimoto, it has been continuously serialized in Weekly Shōnen Jump and other manga magazines since September 1976, making it the longest-running continuously serialized manga in history. 1968 chapters have been collected in 201 tankōbon volumes by Shueisha. As of the publication of volume 168, the series had sold over 145 million copies. Some of chapters were not collected in tankōbon format.

The series takes place in the present day in and around a neighborhood police station (kōban) in downtown Tokyo, and revolves around the misadventures of a middle-aged cop, Kankichi Ryotsu (Ryo-san).

== Volume list ==
=== Volumes 1–25 ===
| No. | Title | Japanese release date | Japanese ISBN |
|---|---|---|---|
| 1 | Ryo-san the Quick-Draw!? Hayauchi Ryō-san!? (早うち両さん!?) | July 9, 1977 | 978-4-08-852811-3 |
| 2 | Enemies and Commoners!! Teki mo Saru Mono!! (敵もさるもの!!) | September 10, 1977 | 978-4-08-852812-0 |
| 3 | The Disappearing Police Box!? Kieta Hashutsujo!? (消えた派出所!?) | November 10, 1977 | 978-4-08-852813-7 |
| 4 | Kameari's Great Chorus!? Kameari Dai-Gasshō!? (亀有大合唱!?) | February 10, 1978 | 978-4-08-852814-4 |
| 5 | Manager for a Day; Torishimari Biyori (取りしまり日より) | May 10, 1978 | 978-4-08-852815-1 |
| 6 | The da Vinci of Kameari; Kameari no Dabinchi (亀有のダビンチ) | September 9, 1978 | 978-4-08-852816-8 |
| 7 | Remote Control Showdown! Rajikon Kessen! (ラジコン決戦!) | February 10, 1979 | 978-4-08-852817-5 |
| 8 | The Adlibbed Trip... Adoribu Ryokō... (アドリブ旅行...) | June 9, 1979 | 978-4-08-852818-2 |
| 9 | Idol Police; Aidoru Porisu (アイドル・ポリス) | September 10, 1979 | 978-4-08-852819-9 |
| 10 | Substitute Chief Day!? Buchō Daikō no Hi!? (部長代行の日!?) | December 10, 1979 | 978-4-08-852820-5 |
| 11 | Officer Reiko Appears; Reiko Junsa Tōjō (麗子巡査登場) | February 9, 1980 | 978-4-08-852821-2 |
| 12 | Crazy Gambling Era; Gyanburu Kyō-Jidai (ギャンブル狂時代) | April 10, 1980 | 978-4-08-852822-9 |
| 13 | The Homeless Gun!? Kenjū Mushuku!? (拳銃無宿!?) | June 10, 1980 | 978-4-08-852823-6 |
| 14 | Bike Man Honda!! Baiku Otoko Honda!! (バイク男・本田!!) | August 9, 1980 | 978-4-08-852824-3 |
| 15 | The Great Roller Strategy!! Rōrā Dai-Sakusen!! (ローラー大作戦!!) | November 10, 1980 | 978-4-08-852825-0 |
| 16 | Yamato Spirit Repair Shop!? Yamato-Damashii Hozon Kai!? (大和魂保存会!?) | January 10, 1981 | 978-4-08-852826-7 |
| 17 | Drama Strip Detective Toden Hoshi! Gekiga Keiji Hoshi Tōden! (劇画刑事・星 逃田!) | April 10, 1981 | 978-4-08-852827-4 |
| 18 | The Human Turtle! Kame-gata Ningen! (カメ型人間!) | July 10, 1981 | 978-4-08-852828-1 |
| 19 | Ah! The Ninja Car Unit; Ā! Ninja Butai (ああ!忍車部隊) | November 10, 1981 | 978-4-08-852829-8 |
| 20 | The Midnight Pilot! Mayonaka no Pairotto! (真夜中のパイロット!) | January 9, 1982 | 978-4-08-852830-4 |
| 21 | Rika Motoguchi Appears; Motoguchi Rika Tōjō (本口リカ登場) | April 9, 1982 | 978-4-08-852831-1 |
| 22 | Tonight is Free and Easy!! Konya wa Bureikō!! (今夜は無礼講!!) | July 9, 1982 | 978-4-08-852832-8 |
| 23 | Farewell, My Friend! Saraba! Waga Tomo yo (さらば!わが友よ) | September 10, 1982 | 978-4-08-852833-5 |
| 24 | The Dreaded Barber; Bābā no Kyōfu (バーバーの恐怖) | December 8, 1982 | 978-4-08-852834-2 |
| 25 | The Members of the Ryotsu Family; Ryōtsu-ke no Hitobito (両津家の人びと) | March 10, 1983 | 978-4-08-852835-9 |

=== Volumes 26–50 ===
| No. | Title | Japanese release date | Japanese ISBN |
|---|---|---|---|
| 26 | Ryotsu's Saving Method!? Ryōtsu-shiki Chochiku Hō!? (両津式貯蓄法!?) | June 10, 1983 | 978-4-08-852836-6 |
| 27 | An American Cousin!? Amerika yoi Toko!? (アメリカよいとこ!?) | August 10, 1983 | 978-4-08-852837-3 |
| 28 | The New Yukinojo Transformation!? Shin Yukinojō Henge!? (新雪之城変化!?) | October 7, 1983 | 978-4-08-852838-0 |
| 29 | Hello, Goodbye! Harō Gubbai! (ハローグッバイ!) | December 8, 1983 | 978-4-08-852839-7 |
| 30 | Parent and Child Only!? Oyako Mizuirazu!? (親子水いらず!?) | March 9, 1984 | 978-4-08-852840-3 |
| 31 | The All Japan Pro Pachinko Tournament! Zen-Nihon Pachipuro Taikai! (全日本パチプロ大会!) | June 8, 1984 | 978-4-08-852841-0 |
| 32 | Here Comes a Demon! Akuma ga Yatte Kita! (悪魔がやってきた!) | September 10, 1984 | 978-4-08-852842-7 |
| 33 | The Turning Point; Tāningu Pointo (ターニング・ポイント) | December 7, 1984 | 978-4-08-852843-4 |
| 34 | Arrangement Troubles!? Kanji no Kurō!? (幹事の苦労!?) | February 8, 1985 | 978-4-08-852844-1 |
| 35 | Studying in Tokyo!? Tōkyō Ryūgaku!? (東京留学!?) | May 10, 1985 | 978-4-08-852845-8 |
| 36 | Ryo-san's Trip to Nagasaki; Ryō-san no Nagasaki Ryokō (両さんの長崎旅行) | August 9, 1985 | 978-4-08-852846-5 |
| 37 | Terms of Marriage; Kekkon no Jōken (結婚の条件) | November 8, 1985 | 978-4-08-852847-2 |
| 38 | The Killer New Year's Cut; Hissatsu Shōgatsu Katto (必殺正月カット) | January 10, 1986 | 978-4-08-852848-9 |
| 39 | The Spring of Ginza; Ginza no Haru (銀座の春) | March 10, 1986 | 978-4-08-852849-6 |
| 40 | Tokyo's Housing Situation; Tōkyō Jūtaku Jijō (東京住宅事情) | May 9, 1986 | 978-4-08-852850-2 |
| 41 | The South Island Vacation; Minami no Shima no Bakansu (南の島のバカンス) | July 10, 1986 | 978-4-08-852083-4 |
| 42 | Life is Like a Dream... Jinsei wa Yume no Gotoku... (人生は夢のごとく...) | September 10, 1986 | 978-4-08-852084-1 |
| 43 | Bonus Struggle! Bōnasu Sōdatsusen! (ボーナス争奪戦!) | November 10, 1986 | 978-4-08-852085-8 |
| 44 | Bhikkhu Ryotsu! Ryōtsu Oshō! (両津和尚!) | January 9, 1987 | 978-4-08-852086-5 |
| 45 | The Silver Tour; Shirubā Tsuā (シルバー・ツアー) | March 10, 1987 | 978-4-08-852087-2 |
| 46 | Memories of Paris; Omoide no Pari (思い出のパリ) | May 8, 1987 | 978-4-08-852088-9 |
| 47 | Edokko Sushi Course; Edokko Sushi Kōza (江戸っ子すし講座) | August 10, 1987 | 978-4-08-852089-6 |
| 48 | Call for Silver! Hakugin wa Yobu! (白銀はよぶ!) | October 9, 1987 | 978-4-08-852090-2 |
| 49 | What's With This Love Doll? Nantetatte Ai Dōru (なんてたって愛ドール) | December 4, 1987 | 978-4-08-852091-9 |
| 50 | Choose the Sea of Love; Koi no Oki-Erabu (恋の沖えらぶ) | February 10, 1988 | 978-4-08-852092-6 |

=== Volumes 51–75 ===
| No. | Title | Japanese release date | Japanese ISBN |
|---|---|---|---|
| 51 | Hawaiian Paradise; Hawaian Paradaisu (ハワイアンパラダイス) | April 8, 1988 | 978-4-08-852093-3 |
| 52 | Legend of the Golden Shachihoko!! Ōgon no Shachihoko Densetsu!! (黄金の鯱伝説!!) | June 10, 1988 | 978-4-08-852094-0 |
| 53 | Asakusa Rhapsody; Asakusa Rapusodī (浅草ラプソディー) | August 10, 1988 | 978-4-08-852095-7 |
| 54 | Ryo-san Goes for a Check-up; Ryō-san Ningen-Dokku e Iku (両さん人間ドックへいく) | October 7, 1988 | 978-4-08-852096-4 |
| 55 | Birth of the S.S. (Special Security) Team; S.S. (Supesharu Sekyuriti) Chīmu Tanjō (S.S.(スペシャルセキュリティ)チーム誕生) | December 6, 1988 | 978-4-08-852097-1 |
| 56 | Rosanne's Holiday; Rōzannu no Kyūjitsu (ローザンヌの休日) | February 10, 1989 | 978-4-08-852098-8 |
| 57 | The Tale of Asakusa; Asakusa Monogatari (浅草物語) | April 10, 1989 | 978-4-08-852099-5 |
| 58 | Ryotsu's Great Myōjin; Ryōtsu Dai-Myōjin (両津大明神) | June 9, 1989 | 978-4-08-852100-8 |
| 59 | The Ghost Chimney's Disappearing Day; Obake Entotsu ga Kieta Hi (お化け煙突が消えた日) | August 10, 1989 | 978-4-08-852188-6 |
| 60 | Physical Strength Corporation; Tairyoku Kabushiki Gaisha (体力株式会社) | October 9, 1989 | 978-4-08-852189-3 |
| 61 | Our Dearly Missed Days of Youth; Waga Natsukashiki Shōnen Jidai (我がなつかしき少年時代) | December 5, 1989 | 978-4-08-852190-9 |
| 62 | Ah, My Beloved F40; Ā, Itoshi no F40 (嗚呼、愛しのF40) | February 9, 1990 | 978-4-08-852575-4 |
| 63 | Our Street, Ueno; Waga Machi Ueno (わが町・上野) | April 10, 1990 | 978-4-08-852576-1 |
| 64 | Diary of a Shitamachi Police Box; Shitamachi Kōban Nikki (下町交番日記) | June 8, 1990 | 978-4-08-852577-8 |
| 65 | Great Riot of the Edo Shrine!! Ōedo Mikoshi Dai Soudou!! (大江戸神輿大騒動!!) | August 8, 1990 | 978-4-08-852578-5 |
| 66 | The 200 Kilometer Pursuit! Tsuiseki Nihyakkiro! (追跡200キロ!) | October 8, 1990 | 978-4-08-852579-2 |
| 67 | New Policewoman Maria ♡ Appears; Shinnin Keikan Maria ♡ Tōjō (新任警官麻里愛♡登場) | December 4, 1990 | 978-4-08-852580-8 |
| 68 | The Rare Path of Canadian Hondara Kenpo; Kanada Hondara Kenpō Chin-Dōchū (カナダ翻堕羅拳法珍道中) | February 8, 1991 | 978-4-08-852362-0 |
| 69 | Nakagawa's Father Appears; Nakagawa no Chichi Tōjō (中川の父登場) | April 10, 1991 | 978-4-08-852363-7 |
| 70 | Wild, Roving Trains; Bōsō Kikansha (暴走機関車) | July 10, 1991 | 978-4-08-852364-4 |
| 71 | The Kachidoki Bridge Opens! Kachidoki-bashi Hirake! (勝鬨橋ひらけ!) | September 10, 1991 | 978-4-08-852365-1 |
| 72 | The Wild Engine Race; Gekisō Kikansha Rēsu (激走機関車レース) | November 8, 1991 | 978-4-08-852366-8 |
| 73 | Attack of the Crane Game! Totsugeki! Kurēn Gēmu (突撃!クレーンゲーム) | January 10, 1992 | 978-4-08-852367-5 |
| 74 | Bacchus Ryotsu! Bakkasu Ryōtsu! (バッカス両津!) | March 10, 1992 | 978-4-08-852368-2 |
| 75 | Maria's Greatest Enemy! Maria Saidai no Raibaru! (麻里愛・最大の宿敵(ライバル)!) | June 10, 1992 | 978-4-08-852369-9 |

=== Volumes 76–100 ===
| No. | Title | Japanese release date | Japanese ISBN |
|---|---|---|---|
| 76 | Tale of the Seven Stars of Asakusa; Asakusa Nanatsuboshi Monogatari (浅草七ツ星物語) | August 4, 1992 | 978-4-08-852370-5 |
| 77 | Bhikkhu Ryotsu Goes Mad!? Goranshin!? Ryōtsu Oshō (ご乱心!?両津和尚) | October 2, 1992 | 978-4-08-852013-1 |
| 78 | As a Brother...! Ani to Shite...! (兄として...!) | December 2, 1992 | 978-4-08-852014-8 |
| 79 | Memories of the Shirahige Bridge; Shirahige-bashi no Omoide (白鬚橋の思い出) | February 4, 1993 | 978-4-08-852015-5 |
| 80 | Reiko's Bold Photographs!? Reiko no Daitan Shashinshū!? (麗子の大胆写真集!?) | April 2, 1993 | 978-4-08-852016-2 |
| 81 | Volvo's First Date!? Borubo no Hatsu-Dēto!? (ボルボの初デート!?) | June 4, 1993 | 978-4-08-852017-9 |
| 82 | The Shining Baseball Stadium! Hikari no Kyūjō! (光の球場!) | August 4, 1993 | 978-4-08-852018-6 |
| 83 | The Mobile Phone Demon! Keitaidenwa-Ma! (携帯電話魔!) | October 4, 1993 | 978-4-08-852019-3 |
| 84 | The Philosophy of Professor Ezaki; Ezaki-kyōju no Tetsugaku (絵崎教授の哲学) | December 2, 1993 | 978-4-08-852020-9 |
| 85 | Crayfish Showdown!? Zarigani Gassen!? (ザリガニ合戦!?) | February 4, 1994 | 978-4-08-852694-2 |
| 86 | It's Here! The Southern Paradise; Shutsugen! Nangoku Paradaisu (出現!南国パラダイス) | April 4, 1994 | 978-4-08-852695-9 |
| 87 | The Wings of Friendship! Yūjō no Tsubasa! (友情の翼!) | June 3, 1994 | 978-4-08-852696-6 |
| 88 | The Disobedient Boss Z1! Wagamama Jōshi Z1! (わがまま上司Z1!) | August 4, 1994 | 978-4-08-852697-3 |
| 89 | The Shitamachi Susanoo Shrine Festival; Shitamachi Susano'o Jinja Matsuri (下町 素盞雄神社祭) | October 4, 1994 | 978-4-08-852698-0 |
| 90 | The Ploiceman's Theory of Evolution! Keisatsu-techō Shinkaron! (警察手帳進化論!) | December 2, 1994 | 978-4-08-852699-7 |
| 91 | Attack of Ryo-san the Electro-magnetic Wave!? Totsugeki! Denba Ryō-san!? (突撃!電波・両さん!?) | February 3, 1995 | 978-4-08-852700-0 |
| 92 | To My Loved Brother; Shin'ai naru Aniki e (親愛なる兄貴へ) | April 4, 1995 | 978-4-08-852736-9 |
| 93 | Jody the Lover Appears!? Koibito!? Jodī Tōjō! (恋人!?ジョディー登場!) | June 2, 1995 | 978-4-08-852737-6 |
| 94 | Beigoma Expert Ryotsu!! Beigoma Meijin Ryōtsu!! (ベーゴマ名人両津!!) | August 9, 1995 | 978-4-08-852738-3 |
| 95 | Asakusa Samba Carnival; Asakusa Sanba Kānibaru (浅草サンバカーニバル) | October 4, 1995 | 978-4-08-852739-0 |
| 96 | The Ryotsu Line Moves Today!? Ryōtsu-sen Honjitsu Unkō!? (両津線本日運行!?) | December 1, 1995 | 978-4-08-852740-6 |
| 97 | The Asakusa Cinema Paradise; Asakusa Shinema Paradaisu (浅草シネマパラダイス) | March 4, 1996 | 978-4-08-852808-3 |
| 98 | Electric Love Story; Dennō Rabu Sutorī (電脳ラブストーリー) | May 10, 1996 | 978-4-08-852809-0 |
| 99 | The Fighting Gamer Policeman Appears!! Kakutō Gēmā Keikan Tōjō!! (格闘ゲーマー警官登場!!) | August 2, 1996 | 978-4-08-852810-6 |
| 100 | Meeting on the Internet; Intānetto de Aimashō (インターネットで逢いましょう) | November 1, 1996 | 978-4-08-852687-4 |

=== Volumes 101–120 ===
| No. | Title | Japanese release date | Japanese ISBN |
|---|---|---|---|
| 101 | Ryo-san's One Day of Summer; Ryō-san Natsu no Ichinichi (両さん夏の一日) | March 4, 1997 | 978-4-08-852688-1 |
| 102 | The Ancient Capital's Revolving Lantern; Koto no Sōmatō (古都の走馬灯) | June 4, 1997 | 978-4-08-852689-8 |
| 103 | The Great Purikura Strategy! Purikura Dai-Sakusen! (プリクラ大作戦!) | August 4, 1997 | 978-4-08-852858-8 |
| 104 | No More Tamagotchi; Naichitchi Tamagotchi (無いちっちたまごっち) | October 3, 1997 | 978-4-08-852859-5 |
| 105 | Secret Reiko Figure Now on Sale!? Maruhi Reiko Figyua Hatsubaichū!? ((秘)麗子フィギュア発売中!?) | December 4, 1997 | 978-4-08-852860-1 |
| 106 | Asakusa Bon Festival Graffiti; Asakusa Obon Gurafiti (浅草お盆グラフィティ) | February 4, 1998 | 978-4-08-872514-7 |
| 107 | Night of the Keiri Railroad; Hotarunosato Tetsudō no Yoru (螢里鉄道の夜) | April 3, 1998 | 978-4-08-872539-0 |
| 108 | So Long After School; Tōi Hōkago (遠い放課後) | June 4, 1998 | 978-4-08-872563-5 |
| 109 | Circus Symphony; Sākasu Shinfonī (CIRCUS SYMPHONY) | August 4, 1998 | 978-4-08-872587-1 |
| 110 | Super Policewoman Haya Isowashi Appears! Chō-Fukei Isowashi Haya Tōjō! (超婦警・磯鷲早矢登場!) | October 2, 1998 | 978-4-08-872612-0 |
| 111 | Birth of the New Maria!? Nyū Maria Tanjō!? (ニュー麻里愛誕生!?) | December 3, 1998 | 978-4-08-872636-6 |
| 112 | Tokyo's Famous Great Edo Land; Tōkyō Meisho Ōedo Rando (東京名所・大江戸ランド) | February 4, 1999 | 978-4-08-872666-3 |
| 113 | The Bow of Sakyo; Sakyō no Yumi (左京の弓) | April 2, 1999 | 978-4-08-872693-9 |
| 114 | Ryo-san's Kyoto Visit Chronicle; Ryō-san Kyōto Hōmon-ki (両さん京都訪問記) | June 3, 1999 | 978-4-08-872721-9 |
| 115 | The Tale of Kameari's Famous Painting; Kameari Meiga-Za Monogatari (亀有名画座物語) | August 4, 1999 | 978-4-08-872745-5 |
| 116 | Love Maria; Love Maria (Love Maria) | October 4, 1999 | 978-4-08-872771-4 |
| 117 | Summer Vacation in Southern Tahiti!! Nangoku Tahichi de Natsuyasumi!! (南国タヒチで夏休み!!) | December 2, 1999 | 978-4-08-872796-7 |
| 118 | Matoi Giboshi, Edokko; Edokko Giboshi Matoi (江戸っ娘・擬宝珠纏) | March 3, 2000 | 978-4-08-872834-6 |
| 119 | Ryo-san Becomes a Cook!? Ryō-san Itamae ni Naru!? (両さん板前になる!?) | May 1, 2000 | 978-4-08-872859-9 |
| 120 | Ryo-san's Millennium Marriage!! Ryō-san no Mireniamu Kon!! (両さんのミレニアム婚!!) | July 4, 2000 | 978-4-08-872883-4 |

=== Volumes 121–140 ===
| No. | Title | Japanese release date | Japanese ISBN |
|---|---|---|---|
| 121 | Follow the Hijiri Bridge's White Line; Hijiri-bashi Hakusen Nagashi (聖橋白線流し) | September 4, 2000 | 978-4-08-873006-6 |
| 122 | Tropical de Amigo; Toropikaru DE Amīgo (トロピカルDEアミーゴ) | November 2, 2000 | 978-4-08-873033-2 |
| 123 | Ibu's Marriage; Ibu no Kekkon (伊歩の結婚) | January 6, 2001 | 978-4-08-873058-5 |
| 124 | Great Edo Baseball; Ōedo Yakyū (大江戸野球) | April 4, 2001 | 978-4-08-873095-0 |
| 125 | Kyoto Story; Kyōto Monogatari (京都ものがたり) | June 4, 2001 | 978-4-08-873122-3 |
| 126 | On Festival Day... Matsuri no Hi ni... (祭りの日に...) | August 3, 2001 | 978-4-08-873156-8 |
| 127 | Ask Father... about the 21st Century! Chichi wo Tazunete... Nijūisseiki! (父をたずねて...21世紀!) | November 2, 2001 | 978-4-08-873181-0 |
| 128 | The Phantom "God's Tongue"; Maboroshi no "Kami no Shita" (幻の"神の舌") | January 5, 2002 | 978-4-08-873207-7 |
| 129 | Ryo-san's "A Dog's Life"! Ryō-san no "Inu no Seikatsu"! (両さんの「犬の生活」!) | April 4, 2002 | 978-4-08-873245-9 |
| 130 | Tokyo Bath House Scroll; Tōkyō Sentō Emaki (東京銭湯絵巻) | June 4, 2002 | 978-4-08-873279-4 |
| 131 | Lemon's First Sanja Matsuri; Remon Hatsu Sanja-matsuri (檸檬初三社祭) | August 2, 2002 | 4-08-873294-4 |
| 132 | Support Yourself!! Police Headquarters Tank Squad; Dokuritsu!! Keishichō Senshatai (独立!!警視庁戦車隊) | November 1, 2002 | 4-08-873337-1 |
| 133 | The Naginata Showdown! Naginata Taiketsu! (なぎなた対決!) | January 6, 2003 | 4-08-873364-9 |
| 134 | Lemon and Mikan; Remon to Mikan (檸檬と蜜柑) | April 4, 2003 | 4-08-873406-8 |
| 135 | Building the Isowashi Budokan; Isowashi Budōkan Chakkō (磯鷲武道館着工) | June 4, 2003 | 4-08-873431-9 |
| 136 | Our Tokyo Tower; Boku-tachi no Tōkyō Tawā (ぼくたちの東京タワー) | August 4, 2003 | 4-08-873491-2 |
| 137 | The Rowdy Kanda Festival; Bakusō Kanda Matsuri (爆走神田祭) | November 4, 2003 | 4-08-873521-8 |
| 138 | Yuutsu Returns to Tokyo; Yūutsu Kikyō su (憂鬱帰京す) | January 5, 2004 | 4-08-873554-4 |
| 139 | Fly, Concorde! Tobe! Konkorudo (飛べ!コンコルド) | April 2, 2004 | 4-08-873584-6 |
| 140 | Haru Mido of the Tsūtenkaku Police Station Appears!! Tsūtenkakusho Midō Haru Tōjō!! (通天閣署・御堂春登場!!) | June 4, 2004 | 4-08-873606-0 |

=== Volumes 141–160 ===
| No. | Title | Japanese release date | Japanese ISBN |
|---|---|---|---|
| 141 | The Chimney of Hope; Kibō no Entotsu (希望の煙突) | August 4, 2004 | 978-4-08-873637-2 |
| 142 | Entrusted with Life; Jinsei Sōdan Makasenasai (人生相談まかせなさい) | November 4, 2004 | 978-4-08-873666-2 |
| 143 | Osaka is our Local Spot! Ōsaka wa Wate no Jimoto den ga na! (大阪はわての地元でんがな!) | January 5, 2005 | 978-4-08-873693-8 |
| 144 | The Once in 4 Years Higurashi Festival; Yonen ni Ichido no Higurashi Matsuri (4年に一度の日暮祭) | April 4, 2005 | 978-4-08-873789-8 |
| 145 | The 20 Year Now and Then Story; Nijūnen Konjaku Sutorī (20年今昔物語(ストーリー)) | June 3, 2005 | 978-4-08-873816-1 |
| 146 | The Meeting Bridge; Deai no Hashi (出会いの橋) | August 4, 2005 | 978-4-08-873838-3 |
| 147 | My Forgotten Birthday; Kioku ni Nai Washi no Tanjōbi (記憶にないわしの誕生日) | November 4, 2005 | 978-4-08-873871-0 |
| 148 | Raise the Curtain on the Osaka Expo; Ōsaka Banpaku Kaimaku ya de~ (大阪万博開幕やで〜) | January 5, 2006 | 978-4-08-874004-1 |
| 149 | The Sensational Kyoto Gion Matsuri; Kyōto Gion Matsuri Senpū (京都祇園祭旋風) | April 4, 2006 | 978-4-08-874038-6 |
| 150 | The Great 100 Yen Shop Dispute!! Hyakuen Shoppu Dai Ronsō!! (100円ショップ大論争!!) | June 2, 2006 | 978-4-08-874125-3 |
| 151 | Welcome to Akiba, Dear Husband; Yōkoso Akiba e Goshujin-sama (ようこそアキバヘ御主人様) | September 4, 2006 | 978-4-08-874148-2 |
| 152 | Ryotsu is Coming to Kameari! Kameari ni Ryōtsu ga Yattekita! (亀有に両津がやってきた!) | November 2, 2006 | 978-4-08-874272-4 |
| 153 | The Story of the Museum of Transportation; Kōtsū Hakubutsukan Monogatari (交通博物館物語) | January 4, 2007 | 978-4-08-874298-4 |
| 154 | The Track is Still Going! Anywhere at All!? Senro wa Tsuzuku yo! Doko made mo!? (線路は続くよ!どこまでも!?) | April 4, 2007 | 978-4-08-874337-0 |
| 155 | The Great 100 Ryo-san Riot! Hyakunin Ryō-san Ō-abare! (100人両さん大暴れ!) | June 4, 2007 | 978-4-08-874363-9 |
| 156 | The Postcard Shogi Showdown; Hagaki Shōgi Taiketsu (ハガキ将棋対決) | August 3, 2007 | 978-4-08-874395-0 |
| 157 | The Story of the Monkey Train; Osaru no Densha Monogatari (おさるの電車物語) | October 4, 2007 | 978-4-08-874421-6 |
| 158 | A Glass-like Life; Garasu-bari da yo Jinsei wa (ガラスばりだよ人生は) | January 4, 2008 | 978-4-08-874465-0 |
| 159 | Detective Shogi; Shōgi Deka (将棋刑事) | April 4, 2008 | 978-4-08-874493-3 |
| 160 | The Sea is Calling; Umi ga Yondeiru (海が呼んでいる) | June 4, 2008 | 978-4-08-874520-6 |

=== Volumes 161–180 ===
| No. | Title | Japanese release date | Japanese ISBN |
|---|---|---|---|
| 161 | Lemon and the Chief; Remon to Buchō (檸檬と部長) | September 4, 2008 | 978-4-08-874562-6 |
| 162 | Ryo-san returns to Asakusa; Ryō-san Asakusa ni Kaeru (両さん浅草に帰る) | December 4, 2008 | 978-4-08-874588-6 |
| 163 | Hanamichi of Shodō; Shodō no Hanamichi (書道の花道) | February 4, 2009 | 978-4-08-874626-5 |
| 164 | Summer on Adventure Island; Natsu no Bōkenjima (夏の冒険島) | May 1, 2009 | 978-4-08-874661-6 |
| 165 | A Rosy Life; Bara-iro no Jinsei (バラ色の人生) | August 4, 2009 | 978-4-08-874710-1 |
| 166 | Jump 40-Year History Tour; Janpu Yonjūnen-Shi no Tabi (ジャンプ40年史の旅) | September 4, 2009 | 978-4-08-874726-2 |
| 167 | First Dream New Year Cruise; Hatsuyume no Shōgatsu Kurūzu (初夢の正月クルーズ) | November 4, 2009 | 978-4-08-874747-7 |
| 168 | Hanamichi of Kabuki; Kabuki no Hanamichi (歌舞伎の花道) | February 9, 2010 | 978-4-08-874793-4 |
| 169 | Japanese National Cherry Blossom Viewing Holiday; Nihon Zenkoku Hanami Kyūjitsu (日本全国花見休日) | April 7, 2010 | 978-4-08-870019-9 |
| 170 | Let's Stay at the Chief's House; Buchō no Ie ni Tomarō (部長の家に泊まろう) | June 4, 2010 | 978-4-08-870044-1 |
| 171 | Piano Duo; Piano Nijūsō (Dyuo) (ピアノ二重奏(デュオ)) | September 8, 2010 | 978-4-08-870102-8 |
| 172 | Ryo-san goes to India; Ryō-san Indo e Iku (両さんインドへ行く) | December 3, 2010 | 978-4-08-870142-4 |
| 173 | Ryo-san is a Schoolboy; Oyaji Shōgakusei (オヤジ小学生) | February 4, 2011 | 978-4-08-870174-5 |
| 174 | World's Best Shitamachi Tower; Sekai'ichi no Shitamachi Tawā (世界一の下町タワー) | April 21, 2011 | 978-4-08-870207-0 |
| 175 | Jump Out 3D; Tobidase 3D (飛び出せ3D) | July 4, 2011 | 978-4-08-870234-6 |
| 176 | Summer Children Forest School; Natsu no Kodomo Rinkangakkō (夏の子供林間学校) | August 4, 2011 | 978-4-08-870269-8 |
| 177 | Mikan and Medaka; Mikan to Medaka (蜜柑とメダカ) | December 2, 2011 | 978-4-08-870312-1 |
| 178 | Matoi Learns to be a Miko; Matoi no Miko Nyūmon (纏の巫女入門) | February 3, 2012 | 978-4-08-870366-4 |
| 179 | Classroom of Snow; Yuki no Kyōshitsu (雪の教室) | April 4, 2012 | 978-4-08-870399-2 |
| 180 | Inner Circular Route; Shutokō Kanjō sen (首都高勘定せん) | June 4, 2012 | 978-4-08-870427-2 |

=== Volumes 181–201 ===
| No. | Title | Japanese release date | Japanese ISBN |
|---|---|---|---|
| 181 | The Kachidoki Bridge Opens Again!! Kachidoki-bashi, Futatabi Hiraku!! (勝鬨橋、再び開く!!) | August 3, 2012 | 978-4-08-870475-3 |
| 182 | Hang on! Town Factory; Ganbare! Machi-kōba (がんばれ!町工場) | October 4, 2012 | 978-4-08-870514-9 |
| 183 | A Butterfly's Journey; Chō no Tabi (蝶の旅) | December 4, 2012 | 978-4-08-870549-1 |
| 184 | A Snowy Day; Yuki no Hi (雪の日) | February 4, 2013 | 978-4-08-870613-9 |
| 185 | Absorbed in Cherry Blossoms in Kyoto; Kyōto Sakura-zanmai (京都桜三昧) | April 4, 2013 | 978-4-08-870646-7 |
| 186 | It's the Olympics, Higurashi Assembles! Orinpikku Dayo Higurashi Shūgō! (オリンピックだよ日暮集合!) | July 4, 2013 | 978-4-08-870681-8 |
| 187 | Let's Go to the Beach; Umi e Ikō (海へ行こう) | October 4, 2013 | 978-4-08-870817-1 |
| 188 | Lemon's Santa Claus; Remon no Santakurōsu (レモンのサンタクロース) | December 4, 2013 | 978-4-08-870848-5 |
| 189 | How to Make a Vocaloid; Bōkaroido no Tsukurikata (ボーカロイドの作り方) | March 4, 2014 | 978-4-08-880021-9 |
| 190 | Soaring Pigeons; Amakakeru Hato-tachi (天翔る鳩たち) | June 4, 2014 | 978-4-08-880068-4 |
| 191 | When It's Hot, Go to the Beach!! Atsui Toki wa Umi!! (暑い時は海!!) | August 4, 2014 | 978-4-08-880150-6 |
| 192 | Horse Race on Shutokō; Shutokō batoru (首都高馬トル) | October 3, 2014 | 978-4-08-880190-2 |
| 193 | Today Is My Birthday; Kyo wa Watashi no Bāsudi (今日は私のバースディ) | December 5, 2014 | 978-4-08-880218-3 |
| 194 | My Golf Course; Mai Gorufujō (マイゴルフ場) | March 4, 2015 | 978-4-08-880315-9 |
| 195 | Kyoto Seven-tailed Fox Legend; Kyōto Shichibi Densetsu (京都七尾伝説) | June 4, 2015 | 978-4-08-880363-0 |
| 196 | Dream, Dream, Dream; Yume Yume Yume (夢・夢・夢) | September 4, 2015 | 978-4-08-880459-0 |
| 197 | Panda Car; Pandakā (パンダカー) | December 4, 2015 | 978-4-08-880516-0 |
| 198 | Kameari Festival; Kameari-sai (亀有祭) | March 4, 2016 | 978-4-08-880623-5 |
| 199 | Lunar Car Running on the Moon; Getsumen-sha, tsuki o hashiru (月面車、月を走る) | June 3, 2016 | 978-4-08-880683-9 |
| 200 | It's the 40th Anniversary; 40-Shūnenda yo zen'in shūgō no maki (40周年だよ全員集合の巻) | September 17, 2016 | 978-4-08-880773-7 |
| 201 | Revival! Ryōsan is Back in Kameari! Fukkatsu! Ryōsan Kameari ni Kaette Kita! No maki (復活！両さん亀有に帰って来た！の巻) | October 4, 2021 | 978-4-08-882797-1 |
| 202 | — — (—) | September 4, 2026 | 978-4-08-885178-5 |
| 203 | — — (—) | October 2, 2026 | 978-4-08-885202-7 |
