= Baybridge =

Baybridge can refer to:

- Baybridge, Hampshire, England
- Baybridge, Northumberland, England
- Baybridge Canal, Sussex, England

== See also ==
- Bay Bridge (disambiguation)
