= Bay School =

Bay School or The Bay School may refer to:

- The Bay School of San Francisco, a college preparatory high school in San Francisco, California, United States
- The Bay Church of England School, a state-funded all-through school in Sandown, Isle of Wight, England
- Bay School District, a public school district in Craighead County, Arkansas, United States

== See also ==
- Bay (disambiguation)
