= Bays (disambiguation) =

Bays are areas of water bordered by land on three sides.

Bays may also refer to:

- Bays (surname)
- Bays Precinct, an urban renewal project in Sydney, Australia
- Baltimore Bays, a soccer team that played in the North American Soccer League
- Baltimore Bays (1972-1973), a soccer team that played in the American Soccer League
- Baltimore Bays (1993-1998), a soccer team that played in the United Soccer Leagues
- Bays Precinct, in Sydney, Australia
- East Coast Bays AFC, a soccer club in Auckland, New Zealand
- Ferrymead Bays, a soccer club in Christchurch, New Zealand
- Maryland Bays, an inaugural franchise of the third incarnation of the American Soccer League
- The Bays (band), an English musical group
- 2nd Dragoon Guards (Queen's Bays), commonly known as the Bays

== See also ==
- Baize (disambiguation)
- Bay (disambiguation)
- Bays Mountain
- Baze
