= Battle Strikers =

Toy line

Battle Strikers is a line of magnetically controlled customizable spinning tops. The toy line was released in 2009 by MagNext Toys and Megabloks from Mega Brands.

== See also ==
- Beyblade
- Battling Tops
