= Bays (surname) =

Bays is a surname. Notable people with the surname include:

- Betty Bays (1931–1992), American baseball player
- Carter Bays (born 1975), American television writer
- Christophe Bays (born 1991), Swiss ice hockey goaltender
- Daniel H. Bays (1942–2019), American historian of China
- Eric Bays (born 1932), Canadian bishop
- Jan Chozen Bays (born 1945), American pediatrician and Buddhist writer
- Marguerite Bays (1813–1879), Swiss mystic and Roman Catholic saint
- Nicolas Bays (born 1977), French politician
- Randal Bays (born 1950), American musician
- Steve Bays, Canadian musician, audio engineer, and producer
