= Bae =

Bae or BAE may refer to:

== Organisations ==
- BAE Systems plc, a British defence, security and aerospace company
  - British Aerospace (BAe), a predecessor of BAE Systems
  - BAE Systems Inc., an American subsidiary of BAE Systems plc
- Bureau of American Ethnology, an American anthropological research center and archive
- Bureau of Agricultural Economics, a predecessor of the Economic Research Service
- BAE Batterien, a producer of lead acid batteries
- Buenos Aires Económico, an Argentine newspaper
- Black Arrow Express, a corporate division of the AAI Group of Companies

== People ==
- Salt Bae, a nickname used by Nusret Gokce, a Turkish restaurant owner
- Hakos "Bae" Baelz, an Australian VTuber
- Bae, a member of the girl group Nmixx

== Music ==
- "Bae" (Marcus & Martinus song), a song by Marcus & Martinus
- "Bae Bae", a 2015 song recorded by South Korean boy band Big Bang
- "Bae", a 2026 song by Thinla; Laos' 2026 entry in the Eurovision Song Contest Asia

== Other uses ==
- Bae (surname), a Korean family name
- Bae (word), a slang term of endearment, short for "baby" or "babe"
- Barcelonnette – Saint-Pons Airfield (IATA code: BAE), France
- Barawana language (ISO 639-3 code: bae), a nearly-extinct Arawakan language of Venezuela and Brazil
- Bay, Laguna, a municipality in the Philippines, often called Bae by its residents
- Bae, a female tribal leader (datu) among the Lumad people of the Philippines
- Bronchial artery embolization
