= Bey (surname or title) =

Bey (former beg) is a surname. It is also a Turkish title. Notable people with this surname or title include:

- Ahmed Bey (1784–1850), the last Bey of Constantine; a nineteenth century Algerian resistance leader against the French occupation
- Andy Bey (1939–2025), American jazz singer and pianist
- April Bey, American artist
- Bozan Shaheen Bey (1890–1968), Kurdish tribal leader, politician, and nationalist
- Chief Bey (1913–2004), American jazz musician
- Chris Bey (born 1996), American professional wrestler
- David Bey (1957–2017), American boxer
- Dawoud Bey (born 1953), American photographer
- Djevdet Bey (1878–1955), Ottoman Albanian governor
- Erich Bey (1898–1943), German admiral during the Second World War
- Essad Bey (pen name of Lev Nussimbaum, 1905–1942), Ukrainian/Russian Jewish writer
- Hakim Bey (pseudonym of Peter Lamborn Wilson, 1945–2022), American anarchist and writer
- Legend Bey (born 2007), American football player
- Mehmet Cavit Bey, Turkish economist
- Osman Hamdi Bey, Turkish painter
- Richard Bey (born 1951), American talk show host in the 1990s
- Saddiq Bey (born 1999), American basketball player
- Şahin Bey, Turkish revolutionary
- Salih Zaki Bey (1900–1969), Iraqi Politician
- Salome Bey (1939–2020), American-born Canadian singer-songwriter, composer and actress
- Turhan Bey (1922–2012), Austrian born, American actor
- Tyler Bey (born 1998), American basketball player
- Yasiin Bey (better known by the stage name Mos Def, born 1973), American rap singer
- Yusef Bey (1935–2003), American Black Muslim activist
- Yusuf Bey IV (born 1986), son of Yusef Bey, convicted of murdering a journalist

== See also ==
- Beg (Turkish: bey) Turkish title
- Bey (disambiguation), for people with the title "Bey"
- Darrius Heyward-Bey (born 1987), American football player
