= Baize (disambiguation) =

Baize is a coarse woollen cloth.

Baize may also refer to:

- 1591 Baize, a main-belt asteroid
- Paul Baize (1901–1995), French pediatrician and amateur astronomer
- Baize (Orne, right bank), a right bank tributary of the Orne in Normandy, France
- Baize (Orne, left bank), a left bank tributary of the Orne in Normandy, France

== See also ==
- Bai Ze
- Bays (disambiguation)
- Baze
