= Beyblade =

Spinning and battling tops

- DranSword (Takara Tomy)/Sword Dran (Hasbro) 3-60F, the first Beyblade released as part of the current iteration of the toyline, "Beyblade X"
- Type: Spinning top
- Company: Takara Tomy, Hasbro, Sonokong, Youngtoys, NewBoy, and ToyPro
- Country: Japan
- Availability: 1999–present
- Official website

Beyblade (Japanese: ベイブレード, Hepburn: Beiburēdo) is a battling spinning top toyline and multimedia franchise developed by the Japanese toy company Takara Tomy. Beyblades were inspired by the older Beigoma. The first Beyblades were released in 1999 in Japan, along with a related manga series. Beyblades were developed by Takara until it merged with Tomy in 2006. Various toy companies around the world have licensed Beyblade toys for their own regions, such as Hasbro in most Western countries (such as the United States) and Sonokong in South Korea.

In Beyblade, participants compete in battles between two or more spinning tops called "Beyblades", or Beys. A Beyblade typically consists of multiple parts, and players can combine parts to create their own combination. Battles typically take place in a bowl-like stadium (called a Beystadium), into which players release Beyblades using a handheld launcher. A player wins if their Beyblade spins for a longer period of time or if the opponent's Beyblade exits the stadium. In Beyblade Burst and Beyblade X, players may also win if their opponent's Beyblade splits apart, known as "bursting".

There are four successive series of Beyblade tops, each designed with its own component parts that are not compatible with tops of other series. Tops are designed for play only with tops of the same series, and each series has a separate media continuity. The first iteration is Bakuten Shoot Beyblade (also known simply as Beyblade in the Western releases) and made mostly out of plastic, ran from 1999 to 2004. Beyblade: Metal Fusion (also known as Metal Fight Beyblade in Japan) is the second iteration which featured metal components and introduced the points system and ran from 2008 to 2010. Beyblade Burst is the third iteration which introduced the "burst" mechanic and ran from 2015 to 2021. Beyblade X, the current and fourth iteration, began in 2023.

Every series of Beyblade has manga and anime series tie-ins. The original manga series was adapted into an anime series produced by Madhouse and Nippon Animedia (a partnership between Takara and Nippon Animation), and the related 2002 film Beyblade: Fierce Battle. The Beyblade: Metal Fusion anime adaptation, retroactively named Beyblade: Metal Saga, was produced by Tatsunoko Production and SynergySP for four seasons and accompanied by the 2010 action-adventure film, Metal Fight Beyblade vs the Sun: Sol Blaze, the Scorching Hot Invader. The spinoff anime BeyWheelz was released in 2012.

== History ==
Both the toys and their names were inspired by the Beigoma, a traditional Japanese spinning top. The concept is similar to Battling Tops, a spinning top game developed in 1968, and to the traditional spinning top games of topac, gasing pangkah, and pambaram and the previous Japanese toy line of Spin Fighters (1993–1997).

The toy line was introduced with an accompanying manga series of the same name in 1999. The manga ran from 1999 to 2004, with the anime running for 3 seasons from 2001 to 2003 with 51 episodes per season. In 2002, Hasbro sold Beyblade toys internationally (under license from Takara) along with a coordinated country-by-country release of localized versions of the television show. On July 12, 2008, Takara Tomy released Metal Fight: Beyblade, the second generation of the toy. The third generation, titled Beyblade Burst, was released by Takara Tomy on July 18, 2015. The fourth generation of the toy line, Beyblade X, was released in June 2023.

== Game and rules ==
Aside from informal play, the game has a set of published rules. In the official competition, at least two players engage in the game. Each participant is permitted a maximum of three Beyblades, and swapping out Beyblade parts is strictly prohibited once a match commences. Players can select any of their three available Beyblades for each battle within a game.

In Metal Fight Beyblade, the points system was introduced. In the Beyblade Burst line of toys, Hasbro releases its own rule set for its toy line. In general, the first player to 3 points for older generations or 4 points for Beyblade X will win a match.

- One point is awarded if the opponent's Beyblade stops spinning (Out Spin/Survivor Finish/Spin Finish) and your bey is still spinning.
- Two points are awarded if the opponent's Beyblade is knocked out of the stadium or falls into a pocket in the stadium (Knockout/KO/Stadium Out/Ring Out/Over Finish).
- Beginning with Beyblade Burst, two points are awarded if the opponent's top "bursts" disassembling(the top disconnecting with the bottom) (Burst Finish).
- Beginning with Beyblade X, three points are awarded if the opponent's top is knocked through the Xtreme Pocket in the special Xtreme Stadium (Xtreme Finish).

In the event of a draw (which results if both Beyblades either exit the ring simultaneously, stop spinning simultaneously, or burst at the same time), no points are awarded to either player. The stadium's pockets and entrance are sometimes referred to as an "extended play area" as opposed to a "primary play area" since if a Beyblade gets into one of the pockets but is able to escape (known as rebounding), it will not count as a knockout. For the stadium's entrance, if a Beyblade flies there, gets caught there and goes around the stadium but does not fall out of the stadium, it will also not be counted as a knockout.

== Types of Beyblades ==
There are four main types of Beyblades: the Attack, Defense, Stamina, and Balance types. The first three of those types have intransitive effectiveness, with Defense generally intended to be effective against Attack, Attack against Stamina, and Stamina against Defense. However, due to the high variability of custom configurations, and individual skill of the players, this is not a hard rule.

== Bey stadium ==
An arena called a Bey stadium is sold by both Takara Tomy and Hasbro. It is shaped like an overturned spherical dome but may have other features dependent on the purpose of the particular stadium, like the Xtreme Rail found in Beyblade X stadiums. Different stadiums were released in different markets. Takara Tomy and Sonokong produce Beystadiums similar to those featured in the manga and anime adaptations, with open sections in the walls and openings on the sides to launch into. Hasbro produces stadiums with walls that are about 3.7 in (94 mm) tall and pockets that count as a ring-out instead.

Common features of a Beystadium include a circular shallow ridge called the Tornado Ridge, which allows mobile Beyblades such as Attack Types to move around quickly without accidentally knocking themselves out. Other features may be specific to the series that the Beystadium is released in, like the rails from the Beyblade Burst Cho-Z toy system and the taller Speedstorm toy system.

== Launching ==
A Beyblade Launcher is used to rapidly spin the Beyblade and eject it into the Beystadium. Select launchers have different levels of power depending on the gears inside of them paired with the user's own launch strength. For example, the Proto launcher (Beyblade X) only delivers a small amount of power, which is why people do not use them much. Launchers differ in size and shape, with some of them using Ripcords (long sticks of plastic with grips on the end and teeth on the sides to strike the gears of the launcher when pulled) and others using Strings (long strings with grips on the end that are connected to a gear that has a retracting mechanism to strike the gears of the launcher with slightly more power).

Launching a Beyblade is often accompanied by a catchphrase. In the Takara Tomy version, this would be "3, 2, 1, Go Shoot!" (3、2、1、ゴーシュート!). In the Hasbro version, it was "3, 2, 1, Let it Rip!".

== Burst series ==
Beyblade Burst toys are designed so that the top may separate if it has sustained enough hits, which creates a "burst" due to an unlocking mechanism and a spring in the performance tip. The Burst System consists of 3 parts, the "Energy Layer", the "Forge Disc" that contains most of the weight, and the "Driver", which is the equivalent of the metal series' "Performance Tip", that controls the behavior of the Beyblade.

Toys "R" Us started distributing this system in Canada in September 2016 and Hasbro started distributing the toys in the United States in January 2017.

As the longest-running Beyblade series, Burst has had considerably more subsystems than its predecessors. These are:

- The Dual Layer system, where the layers are made of two inseparable plastic parts.
- The God Layer/SwitchStrike system, where each "layer" has its own gimmick, and the introduction of the core discs: discs that can now be attached to plastic parts called frames that add weight to the bey and feature their own characteristics.
- Takara Tomy's Cho-Z Layer system, in which every "layer" features metal, increasing their weight.
- The SlingShock system, Hasbro's counterpart to the Cho-Z system, features tops with different modes, designed to climb rails when switched to SlingShock mode. All beys excluding Dread Hades and Breaker Xcalius, however, lacked the metal found in their Takara Tomy counterparts. This system marked a turning point; Hasbro would start to do their own systems rather than releasing the same beys as Takara Tomy in their main line.
- The GT Layer system (GaTinko Layer System), which was released by Takara Tomy and featured customizable "layers", altering performance. Many "discs" in this system also began to have their own gimmicks.
- Hasbro's HyperSphere system, released as a counterpart to the GT system, features large, bowl-shaped "performance tips" designed to climb special HyperSphere walls and strike the other Beyblades while descending.
- Takara Tomy's Superking/Sparking system altered the construction of the tops by introducing "chassis", replacements for "forge discs" that heavily increased weight. In addition, new launchers were released, which gave off sparks when used, hence the name "sparking".
- The SpeedStorm system (Hasbro's equivalent to the Superking/Sparking system), features taller tops designed to gain speed or change direction in the SpeedStorm BeyStadiums.
- (The Beyblade Pro Series had came out alongside Sparking/Superking from Hasbro, with Takara Tomy's signature "teeth" instead of Hasbro's main locking system, "slopes".)
- The Dynamite Battle Layer system, once again features customizable "layers", this time with both a "High" and "Low" mode, intended to shift the top's center of gravity. High Mode is more aggressive and is easier to knock over. Low Mode is more balanced and has more stamina.
- The QuadDrive system was released from Hasbro in replacement of the Dynamite Battle layer system. These layers have plastic weights, instead of metal armours, that allow the Beyblade to switch from "Core" and "Apex Mode". Their drivers also feature additional pieces (called Armour Tips) that increase the height and variation of how the Beyblade moves along the stadium. A new Stadium was also released that features levels of playing fields that alternate the bey's path. This is the first system that was designed by Hasbro, and it is the first one that does not rely on the type of stadium to function.
- The Burst Ultimate Layer system would be the most current iteration which features the same concept as the Beyblade Burst DB system but is a different line of Beyblades that are callbacks to previous fan favourites which never got an upgrade like Chain Kerbeus or Xiphoid Xcalibur. These Beys do not get an anime season release but can be assumed to be used by their original users from the God Series.
- Like the Burst Ultimate Layer system, the QuadStrike system is supposed to be an upgrade from the QuadDrive system, however, the Armor Tips are now large and bowl-like, similar to the HyperSphere Drivers.

== Popularity ==
Beyblades were the "most sought-after toy for Christmas 2003" in the UK, and won the British Association of Toy Retailers award for "Toy of the year" in 2002. They were the top-selling battling toys in the US in 2011. By 2003, more than 5 million Beyblade tops were sold in the United States.

== See also ==
- Battling Tops
- Spinja
- Lego Ninjago
- Spin Fighters
- Battle Strikers
