= M'baye =

M'baye is both a given name and a surname. Notable people with the name include:

- Aboubacar M'Baye Camara (born 1985), Guinean footballer
- Malick M'Baye
- Souleymane M'baye (born 1975), professional boxer

== See also ==
- Baye (disambiguation)
- Mbaye (disambiguation)
