= Bays, Kentucky =

Unincorporated community in Kentucky, United States

- Unincorporated community
- Location within Kentucky
- Coordinates: 37°38′46″N 83°14′49″W
- Country: United States
- State: Kentucky
- County: Breathitt
- Elevation: 889 ft (271 m)
- Time zone: UTC-5 (Eastern (EST))
  - Summer (DST): UTC-4 (EDT)
- ZIP code: 41310
- Area code: 606
- GNIS feature ID: 507464

Bays is an unincorporated community in Breathitt County, Kentucky, United States. Bays is located on Kentucky Route 1094 9.9 miles (15.9 km) northeast of Jackson. Bays has a post office from March 30, 1898, to January 3, 2004; it still has its own ZIP code, 41310.
