= Baye (name) =

Baye is both a surname and a given name. Notable people with the name include:

- Michael Baye (born 1961), American academic
- Nathalie Baye (1948–2026), French actress
- Baye Djiby Fall (born 1985), Senegalese football striker

== See also ==
- Paulette del Baye (1877–1945), French actress, singer and dancer from Cuba
