= Bay Area (disambiguation) =

Bay Area most commonly refers to the San Francisco Bay Area, the urban area surrounding the San Francisco Bay in Northern California.

Bay Area may also refer to:

- Chesapeake Bay Area, an area around Chesapeake Bay, Maryland and Virginia
- Galveston Bay Area, an area around Galveston Bay, Texas
- Guangdong–Hong Kong–Macao Greater Bay Area (Greater Bay Area, GBA), an area around Guangdong, Macau, and Hong Kong, China
- Manila Bay Area, an area around Manila Bay, Philippines
- Monterey Bay Area, an area around Monterey Bay, California
- Tampa Bay area, an area around Tampa Bay, Florida
- Traverse Bay Area, an area around Grand Traverse Bay, Michigan
