= Bay Bridge =

Bay Bridge may refer to:

- Aomori Bay Bridge, Aomori Prefecture, Japan
- Chesapeake Bay Bridge, Maryland, United States
- Chesapeake Bay Bridge–Tunnel, Virginia, United States
- CRRNJ Newark Bay Bridge (demolished), Elizabeth-Bayonne, New Jersey, United States
- Irondequoit Bay Bridge, New York, United States
- Jiaozhou Bay Bridge, Shandong, China
- Newark Bay Bridge, Newark, New Jersey, United States
- San Francisco–Oakland Bay Bridge, California, United States
  - Bay Bridge Series, defunct Major League Baseball rivalry between the San Francisco Giants and Oakland Athletics
- Upper Bay Bridge, Newark-Bayonne, New Jersey, United States
- Yokohama Bay Bridge, Yokohama, Japan
- Bay Bridge (horse), racehorse

== See also ==
- Baybridge (disambiguation)
