= Bay Township =

Bay Township may refer to:

- Bay Township, Michigan
- Bay Township, Ohio
