= BAE Batterien =

German producer of lead acid batteries

Coordinates: 52°27′27″N 13°31′42″E

BAE Batterien GmbH
- Company type: GmbH
- Industry: lead acid batteries, manufacturing, energy
- Founded: 1899
- Headquarters: Berlin, Germany
- Key people: Jan IJspeert (CEO)
- Products: lead acid batteries
- Revenue: €30.00 million (2009)
- Number of employees: 170 (end 2009)
- Website: www.bae-berlin.de

BAE Batterien GmbH (founded as Berliner Akkumulatoren- und Elementefabrik) is a producer of lead acid batteries for automotive and industrial applications and is headquartered in Germany since 1899.

== Overview ==
The company is selling its batteries worldwide for the use in photovoltaic (solar-power related), telecommunication systems, electric utilities, railroads, uninterruptible power supply (UPS) and motive-power applications including lift trucks, forklift trucks, high-rack stackers, etc.

== See also ==
- Primearth EV Energy
