= Bay (shelving) =

Basic unit of library shelving

Example of a bay

A bay is a basic unit of library shelving. Bays are bookcases about 3 feet (0.9 m) wide, arranged together in rows.

In modern practice, books are shelved from the top shelf to the bottom shelf in each bay, but in historic libraries where the shelves in a bay are not adjustable, it is common for the lower shelves to be spaced to accommodate taller books, with each book having a designated location.

Rows consist of a number of bays, either single-sided or double-sided, connected to each other. The standard length of a row is five to six bays, but it is not uncommon to find rows seven bays wide or even wider. In some countries, a row is referred to as a 'stack' or a 'range'.
