= Josep Maria Bayarri =

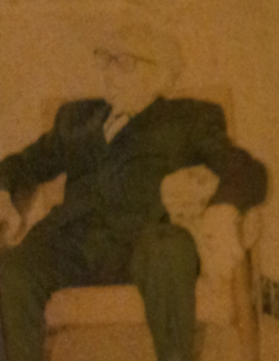
Josep Maria Bayarri 1969

Josep Maria Bayarri i Hurtado (Valencian pronunciation: [dʒuˈzɛb maˈɾi.a baˈjari]; 1886–1970 in Alboraya), also known as Xusep Maria Vaiarri, was a writer and poet.

He studied at the San Carlos School of Fine Arts before releasing in 1915 his first publication, a collection of Valencian poetry, Poetes valencians contemporanis, featuring various poets of his generation. He later helped found two poetry magazines in the Valencian language, El vers valencià (1934) and Ribalta (1939).

During several stages of his literary life he attempted to impose linguistic norms upon Valencian, based on the Apitxat (Central Valencian) dialect instead of Standard Valencian. One such was the 1966 book Alfavetisasió dels valensians. These attempts, however, met with little success.

His last work, published in the year of his death, was La qinteta epdomadaria (1970).
