= Baze =

Baze is a surname. Notable people with the surname include:

- Gary Baze (born 1955), American jockey
- Grant Baze (1943–2009), American bridge player
- Michael C. Baze (born 1987), American jockey
- Ralph Baze (21st century), American murderer
- Russell Baze (born 1958), American jockey
- Tyler Baze (born 1982), American jockey
- Winnie Baze (1914−2006), American football player

== See also ==
- Baize (disambiguation)
- Bays (disambiguation)
- Nathaniel "Baze" Bazile
- Baze Senior Knockout Teams (1994–2018), North American Bridge championship
