= List of original Beyblade episodes =

This is a list of episodes of the anime series Beyblade.

== Series overview ==
No.	Title	Episodes	Run	Director	Studio	Network
1	Beyblade	51	January 8, 2001 – December 24, 2001	Toshifumi Kawase	Madhouse	TXN (TV Tokyo)
2	Beyblade V-Force	51	January 7, 2002 – December 30, 2002	Yoshio Takeuchi	Nippon Animation	TXN (TV Tokyo)
3	Beyblade G-Revolution	52	January 6, 2003 – December 29, 2003	Mitsuo Hashimoto	Nippon Animation	TXN (TV Tokyo)

== Episode list ==
=== Beyblade (2001) ===
No.	Title	Original release date	English air date
1	"The Blade Raider"; Transliteration: "Bakuten Batoru, Gō · Shūto!" (Japanese: 爆転バトル、ゴー·シュート!)	January 8, 2001	July 6, 2002
2	"Day of the Dragoon"; Transliteration: "Hoero Seiryū! Doragūn Tanjō!" (Japanese: ほえろ青龍! ドラグーン誕生!)	January 15, 2001	July 6, 2002
3	"Take it to the Max!"; Transliteration: "Atarashiki Tomo, Sononaha Makkusu" (Japanese: 新しき友、その名はマックス)	January 22, 2001	July 7, 2002
4	"The Qualifier Begins"; Transliteration: "Kaimaku! Batorutōnamento!" (Japanese: 開幕! バトルトーナメント!)	January 29, 2001	July 13, 2002
5	"Draciel of Approval"; Transliteration: "Gekitotsu! Makkusu VS Kai" (Japanese: 激突! マックスVSカイ)	February 5, 2001	July 20, 2002
6	"Dragoon Storm"; Transliteration: "Fukiarero! Doragūn Sutōmu!" (Japanese: 吹き荒れろ!ドラグーンストーム!)	February 12, 2001	July 20, 2002
7	"Thirteen Candles"; Transliteration: "Takao VS Kai, Shukumei no Taiketsu!" (Japanese: タカオVSカイ、宿命の対決!)	February 19, 2001	July 21, 2002
8	"Bladin' in the Streets"; Transliteration: "Kessei! BBA Chīmu, Sekai e" (Japanese: 結成! BBAチーム、世界へ)	February 26, 2001	July 27, 2002
9	"Showdown in Hong Kong"; Transliteration: "Aratanaru Seijū, Byakko Zoku" (Japanese: 新たなる聖獣、白虎族)	March 5, 2001	July 28, 2002
10	"Battle in the Sky"; Transliteration: "Kake Agare! Ajia Taikai!" (Japanese: 駆け上がれ! アジア大会!)	March 12, 2001	August 3, 2002
11	"Bye Bye Bit Beast"; Transliteration: "Rei, Byakko o Ushinau!" (Japanese: レイ、白虎を失う!)	March 19, 2001	August 4, 2002
12	"Adios Bladebreakers"; Transliteration: "Saraba BBA Chīmu!" (Japanese: さらばBBAチーム!)	March 26, 2001	August 10, 2002
13	"Crouching Lion, Hidden Tiger"; Transliteration: "Sakebe Rei! Unare Byakko!" (Japanese: さけべレイ! うなれ白虎!)	April 2, 2001	August 11, 2002
14	"The Race is On!"; Transliteration: "Fusenpai? Bundan no BBA Chīmu" (Japanese: 不戦敗? 分断のBBAチーム)	April 9, 2001	August 17, 2002
15	"Going for the Gold"; Transliteration: "Kessen! Ajia no Chōten o Kakete!" (Japanese: 決戦! アジアの頂点をかけて!)	April 16, 2001	August 18, 2002
16	"My Enemy, My Friend"; Transliteration: "Byakko VS Yamaneko" (Japanese: 白虎VS山猫)	April 23, 2001	August 24, 2002
17	"A Score to Settle"; Transliteration: "Fainaru Batoru! Shikkoku no Inazuma!" (Japanese: ファイナルバトル! 漆黒の稲妻!)	April 30, 2001	August 25, 2002
18	"A Star is Born!"; Transliteration: "Makeruna! Chīsana Burēdā" (Japanese: 負けるな! 小さなブレーダー)	May 7, 2001	August 31, 2002
19	"Under the Microscope"; Transliteration: "Jōriku, Aratana Senjō!" (Japanese: 上陸、新たな戦場!)	May 14, 2001	September 1, 2002
20	"It's all Relative"; Transliteration: "Senritsu no Amerikan·Pawā!" (Japanese: 戦慄のアメリカン·パワー!)	May 21, 2001	September 7, 2002
21	"Practice Makes Perfect"; Transliteration: "Tokkun! Atarashiki Chikara o Motomete" (Japanese: 特訓! 新しき力を求めて)	May 28, 2001	September 8, 2002
22	"Blading with the Stars"; Transliteration: "Daitōryō VS Sekai Senbatsu!" (Japanese: 大統領VS世界選抜!)	June 4, 2001	September 14, 2002
23	"Showdown in Vegas"; Transliteration: "Kaimaku! Amerika taikai" (Japanese: 開幕!アメリカ大会)	June 11, 2001	September 15, 2002
24	"Viva Las Vegas"; Transliteration: "Amerikan Hīrō Maikeru no Chikara!" (Japanese: アメリカンヒーロー マイケルの力!)	June 18, 2001	September 21, 2002
25	"My Way or the Highway"; Transliteration: "Junkesshō, Chō Kōsoku Sākitto!" (Japanese: 準決勝、超高速サーキット!)	June 25, 2001	September 22, 2002
26	"Catch a Shooting All-Star"; Transliteration: "Gekitotsu! Amerika taikai kesshōsen" (Japanese: 激突! アメリカ大会決勝戦)	July 2, 2001	September 27, 2002
27	"The Battle of America"; Transliteration: "Shakunetsu no Sukōpion!!" (Japanese: 灼熱のスコーピオン!!)	July 9, 2001	September 28, 2002
28	"Bottom of the Ninth"; Transliteration: "Ketchaku! Amerika taikai!!" (Japanese: 決着! アメリカ大会!!)	July 16, 2001	October 5, 2002
29	"Play it Again, Dizzi"; Transliteration: "BBA Atsuki tatakai no Kiseki!!" (Japanese: BBA 熱き戦いの軌跡)	July 23, 2001	October 6, 2002
30	"Cruising For A Bruising"; Transliteration: "Seijū o shitagaeru mono" (Japanese: 聖獣を従える者)	July 30, 2001	October 12, 2002
31	"London Calling"; Transliteration: "Yōroppa, Haran no Tabidachi" (Japanese: ヨーロッパ、波乱の旅立ち)	August 6, 2001	October 19, 2002
32	"Darkness at the End of the Tunnel..."; Transliteration: "Kyōshū! Yami no Burēdā!" (Japanese: 強襲! 闇のブレーダー!)	August 13, 2001	October 20, 2002
33	"Last Tangle in Paris"; Transliteration: "Kuroi Kage no Gundan" (Japanese: 黒い影の軍団)	August 20, 2001	October 26, 2002
34	"Art Attack"; Transliteration: "Kareinaru seijū tsukai" (Japanese: 華麗なる聖獣使い)	August 27, 2001	October 27, 2002
35	"When in Rome... Beyblade!"; Transliteration: "Korosseo no Kettō!" (Japanese: コロッセオの決闘!)	September 3, 2001	November 2, 2002
36	"Déjà vu all Over Again"; Transliteration: "Taose! Anpisubaina" (Japanese: 倒せ!アンピスバイナ)	September 10, 2001	November 3, 2002
37	"A Knight to Remember!"; Transliteration: "Joōheika no Burēdā" (Japanese: 女王陛下のブレーダー)	September 17, 2001	November 9, 2002
38	"Olympia Challenge"; Transliteration: "Kessei! Saikyō no Yūro Chīmu" (Japanese: 結成!最強のユーロチーム)	September 24, 2001	November 9, 2002
39	"A Majestic Battle... a Majestic Victory?"; Transliteration: "Kimero! Shōri e no Chikara" (Japanese: 決めろ! 勝利への力)	October 1, 2001	November 9, 2002
40	"Hot Battle in a Cold Town"; Transliteration: "Kesshō no ji Roshia" (Japanese: 決勝の地ロシア)	October 8, 2001	April 12, 2003
41	"Out of the Past"; Transliteration: "Ima wa shiki kioku no tobira" (Japanese: いまわしき記憶の扉)	October 15, 2001	April 19, 2003
42	"Drawn to the Darkness"; Transliteration: "Saikyō o Nozomu Mono" (Japanese: 最強を望む者)	October 22, 2001	April 20, 2003
43	"Live and Let Kai!"; Transliteration: "Akumu no Seremonī Matchi" (Japanese: 悪夢のセレモニーマッチ)	October 29, 2001	April 26, 2003
44	"Losing Kai"; Transliteration: "Saraba Kai!" (Japanese: さらばカイ!)	November 5, 2001	April 27, 2003
45	"Breaking the Ice"; Transliteration: "Baikaru-ko no Kettō" (Japanese: バイカル湖の決闘)	November 12, 2001	May 3, 2003
46	"First Strike"; Transliteration: "Bōgu shūrai!" (Japanese: ボーグ襲来!)	November 19, 2001	May 4, 2003
47	"A Lesson for Tyson"; Transliteration: "Saikai! Yūro Chīmu" (Japanese: 再会!ユーロチーム)	November 26, 2001	May 10, 2003
48	"Victory in Defeat"; Transliteration: "Kai no Sentaku" (Japanese: カイの選択)	December 3, 2001	May 11, 2003
49	"A Wicked Wind Blows"; Transliteration: "Byakko no Sakebi" (Japanese: 白虎の叫び)	December 10, 2001	May 17, 2003
50	"New and Cyber-Improved..."; Transliteration: "Setsugen no Mokushiroku" (Japanese: 雪原の黙示録)	December 17, 2001	May 18, 2003
51	"Final Showdown"; Transliteration: "Beiburēdo, yo Eien ni!" (Japanese: ベイブレードよ永遠に!)	December 24, 2001	May 24, 2003

=== Beyblade V-Force (2002) ===
No. overall	No. in season	Title	Original release date	English air date
52	1	"Shot Down in Flames!"; Transliteration: "Aratanaru teki" (Japanese: 新たなる敵)	7 January 2002	30 August 2003
53	2	"The Search for Mr. X"; Transliteration: "Nazo no Burēdā Hantā tachi" (Japanese: 謎のブレーダーハンター達)	14 January 2002	6 September 2003
54	3	"Unseen and Unleashed"; Transliteration: "Mienai seijū" (Japanese: 見えない聖獣)	21 January 2002	6 September 2003
55	4	"Searching For Dragoon"; Transliteration: "Osorubeki IQ Burēdā" (Japanese: 恐るべきIQブレーダー)	28 January 2002	13 September 2003
56	5	"Guess Who's Back in Town?"; Transliteration: "Yomigaeru, Kai" (Japanese: よみがえる、カイ)	4 February 2002	20 September 2003
57	6	"The Magtram Threat"; Transliteration: "Kyōi no magutoramu" (Japanese: 脅威のマグトラム)	11 February 2002	27 September 2003
58	7	"The Reunion Begins"; Transliteration: "Shikumareta chōsen" (Japanese: 仕組まれた挑戦)	18 February 2002	23 September 2003
59	8	"Return of The Bladebreakers!"; Transliteration: "Fukkatsu! BBA chīmu" (Japanese: 復活!BBAチーム)	25 February 2002	24 September 2003
60	9	"La Isla Bey-Nita"; Transliteration: "Mitsurin no batoru sutajiamu" (Japanese: 密林のバトルスタジアム)	4 March 2002	30 September 2003
61	10	"The Island of No Return"; Transliteration: "Kurayami no Gekitotsu" (Japanese: 暗闇の激突)	11 March 2002	7 October 2003
62	11	"The Evil Island of Dr. B"; Transliteration: "Kotō no Daisakusen" (Japanese: 孤島の大決戦)	18 March 2002	14 October 2003
63	12	"Bring Me Dranzer"; Transliteration: "Hoero! Doranzā" (Japanese: 吠えろ! ドランザー)	25 March 2002	14 October 2003
64	13	"Testing One, Two, Three"; Transliteration: "Okite ya Buri no Beibatoru" (Japanese: 掟やぶりのベイバトル)	1 April 2002	28 October 2003
65	14	"Gideon Raises Gerry"; Transliteration: "Tsukurareta seijū" (Japanese: 作られた聖獣)	8 April 2002	4 November 2003
66	15	"Show Me The bit-beasts!" Transliteration: "Seijū o mite mitai!" (Japanese: 聖獣を見てみたい!)	15 April 2002	4 November 2003
67	16	"Psykick's New Recruit"; Transliteration: "Saibā burēdā no Higeki" (Japanese: サイバーブレーダーの悲劇)	22 April 2002	21 September 2003
68	17	"Hilary's Bey-B-Que"; Transliteration: "Shukumei no pureryudo" (Japanese: 宿命のプレリュード)	29 April 2002	27 September 2003
69	18	"When Friends Become Foes"; Transliteration: "Saikai no Kein" (Japanese: 再会のケイン)	6 May 2002	28 September 2003
70	19	"Their Own Private Battles"; Transliteration: "Sorezore no tatakai" (Japanese: それぞれの戦い)	13 May 2002	4 October 2003
71	20	"The Power Half Hour!!"; Transliteration: "Ashita e no ketsui" (Japanese: 明日(アス)への決意)	20 May 2002	5 October 2003
72	21	"Battle Tower Showdown"; Transliteration: "Batoru tawā no inbō" (Japanese: バトルタワーの陰謀)	27 May 2002	11 October 2003
73	22	"Max Takes One For The Team"; Transliteration: "Dorashieru no Kiki" (Japanese: ドラシエルの危機)	10 June 2002	18 October 2003
74	23	"The Bigger The Cyber Driger... The Harder It Falls..."; Transliteration: "Yakusoku no Batorufīrudo" (Japanese: 約束のバトルフィールド)	17 June 2002	25 October 2003
75	24	"Ghost in The Machine"; Transliteration: "Kiri no Naka no Maboroshi" (Japanese: 霧の中の幻)	24 June 2002	26 October 2003
76	25	"Raising Kane!!"; Transliteration: "Dengeki seijū NO. 4" (Japanese: 電撃聖獣NO.4)	1 July 2002	1 November 2003
77	26	"Cyber Dragoon Takes Control!"; Transliteration: "Senritsu no saibā" (Japanese: 戦慄のサイバー)	8 July 2002	2 November 2003
78	27	"Building the Perfect bit-beast" Transliteration: "Bōsō Tawā no Saigo" (Japanese: 暴走タワーの最期)	15 July 2002	8 November 2003
79	28	"Hot Rock"; Transliteration: "Nyū Yōku Nazo no Sekiban" (Japanese: ニューヨーク 謎の石版)	22 July 2002	9 November 2003
80	29	"Bad Seed in The Big Apple"; Transliteration: "Makkusu Tomo no Sakebi" (Japanese: マックス 友の叫び)	29 July 2002	15 November 2003
81	30	"Get a Piece of The Rock!"; Transliteration: "Yomigaeru Sekiban no Chikara" (Japanese: よみがえる石版の力)	5 August 2002	16 November 2003
82	31	"Attack of The Rock bit-beast" Transliteration: "Sekiban seijū shūgeki!" (Japanese: 石版聖獣襲撃!)	12 August 2002	16 November 2003
83	32	"Lots Of Questions... Few Answers"; Transliteration: "Wasurekaketa tamashī" (Japanese: 忘れかけた魂)	19 August 2002	16 November 2003
84	33	"Rock Bottom!"; Transliteration: "Sento· Shīruzu" (Japanese: セント·シールズ)	26 August 2002	16 November 2003
85	34	"Itzy Bey-Itzy Spider"; Transliteration: "Monokage kara supaidā" (Japanese: 物陰からスパイダー)	2 September 2002	6 December 2003
86	35	"See No Bit-Beast, Hear No Bit-Beast"; Transliteration: "Sugata Naki Shikaku" (Japanese: 姿なき刺客)	9 September 2002	7 December 2003
87	36	"Friends and Enemies"; Transliteration: "Makkusu to Mariamu" (Japanese: マックスとマリアム)	16 September 2002	13 December 2003
88	37	"Beybattle at the bit-beast Corral"; Transliteration: "Senjō no Yuenchi" (Japanese: 戦場の遊園地)	23 September 2002	1 February 2004
89	38	"The Fate of The Spark Battle"; Transliteration: "Innen no Supāku Batoru" (Japanese: 因縁のスパークバトル)	30 September 2002	1 February 2004
90	39	"The Bit Beast Bond"; Transliteration: "Kizuna to Puraido" (Japanese: 絆とプライド)	7 October 2002	1 February 2004
91	40	"Squeeze Play"; Transliteration: "Yūjō no Akashi" (Japanese: 友情の証)	14 October 2002	7 February 2004
92	41	"Who's Your Daddy?"; Transliteration: "Totsuzen no Sayonara..." (Japanese: 突然のサヨナラ...)	21 October 2002	21 February 2004
93	42	"Fortunes Dear and Dire"; Transliteration: "Aku no Pātsu kari" (Japanese: 悪のパーツ狩り)	28 October 2002	22 February 2004
94	43	"Kai's Royal Flush"; Transliteration: "Kai no Ribenji Batoru" (Japanese: カイのリベンジバトル)	4 November 2002	28 February 2004
95	44	"The Calm Before The Storm"; Transliteration: "Haran no Sekai-sen Zen'ya" (Japanese: 波乱の世界戦前夜)	11 November 2002	29 February 2004
96	45	"Zeo Vs. Ozuma"; Transliteration: "Zeo VS Ozuma" (Japanese: ゼオVSオズマ)	18 November 2002	6 March 2004
97	46	"Black & White Evil Powers"; Transliteration: "Kuro to Shiro no Ma no Te" (Japanese: 黒と白の魔の手)	25 November 2002	7 March 2004
98	47	"Deceit From Above"; Transliteration: "Tokihanata Reta Akui" (Japanese: 解き放たれた悪意)	2 December 2002	13 March 2004
99	48	"Phoenix Falling"; Transliteration: "Gekishin no Batoru Noizu" (Japanese: 激震のバトルノイズ)	9 December 2002	14 March 2004
100	49	"The Enemy Within"; Transliteration: "Takao VS Kai Yūjō no Tatakai" (Japanese: タカオVSカイ友情の戦い)	16 December 2002	20 March 2004
101	50	"Clash of the Tyson"; Transliteration: "Shijō saidai no Kesshōsen" (Japanese: 史上最大の決勝戦)	23 December 2002	27 March 2004
102	51	"Destiny of The Final Battle"; Transliteration: "Shukumei no Rasuto Batoru" (Japanese: 宿命のラストバトル)	30 December 2002	28 March 2004

=== Beyblade G-Revolution (2003) ===
No. overall	No. in season	Title	Original release date	English air date
103	1	"New Kid in Town"; Transliteration: "Takao, shoubu da!" (Japanese: タカオ、勝負だ!)	January 6, 2003	September 18, 2004
104	2	"A Team Divided"; Transliteration: "Tomodachi jane~e!" (Japanese: 友達じゃねぇ!)	January 13, 2003	September 18, 2004
105	3	"Invitation to Battle"; Transliteration: "Ore ni wa katen" (Japanese: オレには勝てん)	January 20, 2003	September 19, 2004
106	4	"We Were Once Bladebreakers..."; Transliteration: "Ore no michi wa ore ga kimeru" (Japanese: オレの道はオレが決める)	January 27, 2003	September 25, 2004
107	5	"A League of His Own"; Transliteration: "100-Nen hayai ze!" (Japanese: 100年早いぜ!)	February 3, 2003	September 26, 2004
108	6	"You're The Man, Kai!"; Transliteration: "Kai shika ine~e!" (Japanese: カイしかいねぇ!)	February 10, 2003	October 2, 2004
109	7	"Take Your Best Shot!"; Transliteration: "Omae shidaida" (Japanese: オマエしだいだ)	February 17, 2003	October 3, 2004
110	8	"Roughing It"; Transliteration: "Gasshukuja nē!" (Japanese: 合宿じゃねぇ!)	February 24, 2003	October 9, 2004
111	9	"Swiped On The Streets"; Transliteration: "1 + 1 Wa bugendaida ze!" (Japanese: 1+1は無限大だぜ!)	March 3, 2003	October 16, 2004
112	10	"It's a Battle Royale...!"; Transliteration: "Matomete kiya gare!" (Japanese: まとめてきやがれ!)	March 10, 2003	October 17, 2004
113	11	"The Blame Game"; Transliteration: "Ore ga Warui n janē!" (Japanese: オレが悪いんじゃねえ!)	March 17, 2003	October 23, 2004
114	12	"When in Rome... Let it Rip!"; Transliteration: "Gyakuten geki no Makuakeda" (Japanese: 逆転劇の幕開けだ)	March 24, 2003	October 30, 2004
115	13	"Kenny's Big Battle"; Transliteration: "Kyōju wa Kyōju da!" (Japanese: キョウジュはキョウジュだ!)	March 31, 2003	November 6, 2004
116	14	"Picking Up The Pieces"; Transliteration: "Ore ni yara sero!" (Japanese: オレにやらせろ!)	April 7, 2003	November 7, 2004
117	15	"Sleepless in Madrid"; Transliteration: "Pātonā daro!?" (Japanese: パートナーだろ!?)	April 14, 2003	November 13, 2004
118	16	"Fire and Water"; Transliteration: "Jama suru na!" (Japanese: 邪魔するな!)	April 21, 2003	November 20, 2004
119	17	"Same Old Dirty Tricks..."; Transliteration: "Kiwotsukero, Daichi" (Japanese: 気をつけろ、大地)	April 28, 2003	November 27, 2004
120	18	"Beyblade Like an Egyptian"; Transliteration: "Ii kao shiteru ne!" (Japanese: いい顔してるね!)	May 5, 2003	December 4, 2004
121	19	"One For All...Free For All"; Transliteration: "NOーーーTsu!!" (Japanese: NOーーーッ!!)	May 12, 2003	December 11, 2004
122	20	"Burdens of a Champion"; Transliteration: "Makeru na yo…Takao" (Japanese: 負けるなよ…タカオ)	May 19, 2003	December 18, 2004
123	21	"Under Pressure"; Transliteration: "Dasadasada ze!" (Japanese: ダサダサだぜ!)	May 26, 2003	December 25, 2004
124	22	"Sibling Rivalry"; Transliteration: "Antanara kateru!" (Japanese: アンタなら勝てる!)	June 2, 2003	January 1, 2005
125	23	"Ray and Kai: The Ultimate Face Off!"; Transliteration: "Madada…!" (Japanese: まだだ…!)	June 9, 2003	January 8, 2005
126	24	"Down Under Thunder"; Transliteration: "Pawā zenkaida!!" (Japanese: パワー全開だ!!)	June 16, 2003	January 15, 2005
127	25	"Max Attacks!"; Transliteration: "GOーーーtsu!!" (Japanese: GOーーーッ!!)	June 23, 2003	January 22, 2005
128	26	"Familiar Faces"; Transliteration: "Yossha!" (Japanese: よっしゃー!)	June 30, 2003	January 29, 2005
129	27	"What a Blast!"; Transliteration: "Saikō ni omoshiroi zo!" (Japanese: 最高に面白いぞ!)	July 7, 2003	February 5, 2005
130	28	"Changing Gears"; Transliteration: "Mada ka yo!" (Japanese: まだかよ!)	July 14, 2003	February 12, 2005
131	29	"And Then There Were Two"; Transliteration: "Ore nara koko da" (Japanese: オレならここだ)	July 21, 2003	February 19, 2005
132	30	"Let the Games Begin... Again!"; Transliteration: "Owari janē!!" (Japanese: 終わりじゃねえ!!)	July 28, 2003	February 26, 2005
133	31	"Runaway Daichi"; Transliteration: "Jā na!" (Japanese: じゃあな!)	August 4, 2003	March 5, 2005
134	32	"Beyblade Idol"; Transliteration: "Wake wakan nē!!" (Japanese: わけわかんねえ!!)	August 11, 2003	March 12, 2005
135	33	"Out of Their League"; Transliteration: "Ayamare!!" (Japanese: あやまれ!!)	August 18, 2003	March 19, 2005
136	34	"The Mysterious Mystel"; Transliteration: "Kimi no na wa…" (Japanese: キミの名は…)	August 25, 2003	March 26, 2005
137	35	"Pros and Ex-cons"; Transliteration: "Omae ni aete yokatta ze" (Japanese: おまえに会えてよかったぜ)	September 1, 2003	April 2, 2005
138	36	"Boris, the Blade Stops Here!"; Transliteration: "Fuzakeru na!" (Japanese: ふざけるな!)	September 8, 2003	April 9, 2005
139	37	"The BEGA Challenge"; Transliteration: "1000% da!" (Japanese: 1000%だ!)	September 15, 2003	April 16, 2005
140	38	"BEGA on the Rise"; Transliteration: "Jigoku o Miru zo" (Japanese: 地獄を見るぞ)	September 22, 2003	April 23, 2005
141	39	"Rebel Alliance"; Transliteration: "BBA no Saishū heiki" (Japanese: BBAの最終兵器)	September 29, 2003	April 30, 2005
142	40	"Back to Basics"; Transliteration: "Gibu Appu ka?" (Japanese: ギブアップか?)	October 6, 2003	May 7, 2005
143	41	"And Justice-Five For All"; Transliteration: "Nan no Tsumorida" (Japanese: なんのつもりだ)	October 13, 2003	May 14, 2005
144	42	"When You Wish Upon A Star"; Transliteration: "Misutā X da!" (Japanese: ミスターXだ!)	October 20, 2003	May 21, 2005
145	43	"Sing Ming Ming Sing!"; Transliteration: "Ā Yū Redi?" (Japanese: アーユーレディ?)	November 3, 2003	May 28, 2005
146	44	"Refuse to Lose"; Transliteration: "Zettai ni katsu!!" (Japanese: 絶対に勝つ!!)	November 10, 2003	June 4, 2005
147	45	"Max to the Max"; Transliteration: "OK!" (Japanese: OK!)	November 17, 2003	June 11, 2005
148	46	"The Return of Kai"; Transliteration: "Torebia-pin!" (Japanese: トレビア〜ン!)	November 24, 2003	June 18, 2005
149	47	"Now You're Making Me Mad"; Transliteration: "Huh?" (Japanese: えっ!?)	December 1, 2003	June 25, 2005
150	48	"The Beyblading Spirit"; Transliteration: "Ai da…!" (Japanese: 愛だ…!)	December 8, 2003	July 2, 2005
151	49	"Principles of Victory"; Transliteration: "Achō!" (Japanese: アチョーーー!)	December 15, 2003	July 9, 2005
152	50	"Welcome to my Nightmare!"; Transliteration: "Kono Makeinu ga!" (Japanese: この負け犬が!)	December 22, 2003	August 19, 2005
153	51	"Brooklyn's Back"; Transliteration: "Uza Inda Yotsu!" (Japanese: ウザいんだよっ!)	December 29, 2003 (Note: This episode was originally aired in Japan as a special double episode. In the English dub and the versions based on it, the episode was split in two.)	July 23, 2005
154	52	"Beybattle for the Ages"; Transliteration: "GO! Shūto!!" (Japanese: GO!シュート!!)	December 29, 2003	July 30, 2005

== DVD releases ==
Episodes	Japanese release		American release
Beyblade
1-3	SHOOT.1	June 27, 2001	Beyblade: Let it Rip!
4-6	SHOOT.2	July 25, 2001	Beyblade: Let it Rip!
7-11	SHOOT.3	August 29, 2001	The Bladebreakers
12-16	SHOOT.4	September 29, 2001	Hidden Tiger
17-21	SHOOT.5	October 30, 2001	Topsy Turvy
22-26	SHOOT.6	November 29, 2001	Grudge Match
27-31	SHOOT.7	December 29, 2001	American Showdown
32-36	SHOOT.8	January 26, 2002	Euroblade Battle
37-41	SHOOT.9	February 28, 2002	Majestic Match
42-46	SHOOT.10	March 27, 2002	Russian Challenges
47-51	SHOOT.11	April 24, 2002	World Championships
V-Force
1-3	Blader Project: Vol.1	June 26, 2002	Searching for Dragoon (Australian release only)
4-6	Blader Project: Vol.2	July 31, 2002	Searching for Dragoon (Australian release only)
7-9	Blader Project: Vol.3	July 31, 2002	Searching for Dragoon (Australian release only)
10-12	Blader Project: Vol.4	September 26, 2002	Searching for Dragoon (Australian release only)
13-15	Blader Project: Vol.5	September 26, 2002	No non-domestic release
16-18	Blader Project: Vol.6	October 30, 2002	No non-domestic release
19-21	Blader Project: Vol.7	November 27, 2002	No non-domestic release
22-24	Blader Project: Vol.8	November 27, 2002	No non-domestic release
25-27	Blader Project: Vol.9	December 18, 2002	No non-domestic release
28-30	Victory BB: Vol.1	January 22, 2003	No non-domestic release
31-33	Victory BB: Vol.2	January 22, 2003	No non-domestic release
34-36	Victory BB: Vol.3	February 26, 2003	No non-domestic release
37-39	Victory BB: Vol.4	February 26, 2003	No non-domestic release
40-42	Victory BB: Vol.5	March 26, 2003	No non-domestic release
43-45	Victory BB: Vol.6	April 16, 2003	No non-domestic release
46-48	Victory BB: Vol.7	April 16, 2003	No non-domestic release
49-51	Victory BB: Vol.8	May 21, 2003	No non-domestic release
G-Revolution
1-3	Beyblade G Revolution: Vol.1	August 16, 2003	Beginning of The End?
4-6	Beyblade G Revolution: Vol.2	October 6, 2003	The Revolution Begins
7-9	Beyblade G Revolution: Vol.3	October 6, 2003	Take Your Best Shot!
10-12	Beyblade G Revolution: Vol.4	October 24, 2003	It's A Battle Royale!
13-15	Beyblade G Revolution: Vol.5	October 24, 2003	Picking Up The Pieces
16-18	Beyblade G Revolution: Vol.6	November 28, 2003	Same Old Dirty Tricks
19-21	Beyblade G Revolution: Vol.7	November 28, 2003	One For All... Free For All (rare)
22-24	Beyblade G Revolution: Vol.8	December 19, 2003	No non-domestic release
25-27	Beyblade G Revolution: Vol.9	December 19, 2003	No non-domestic release
28-30	Beyblade G Revolution: Vol.10	January 23, 2004	No non-domestic release
31-33	Beyblade G Revolution: Vol.11	January 23, 2004	No non-domestic release
34-36	Beyblade G Revolution: Vol.12	February 27, 2004	No non-domestic release
37-39	Beyblade G Revolution: Vol.13	February 27, 2004	No non-domestic release
40-42	Beyblade G Revolution: Vol.14	March 26, 2004	No non-domestic release
43-45	Beyblade G Revolution: Vol.15	March 26, 2004	No non-domestic release
46-48	Beyblade G Revolution: Vol.16	April 23, 2004	No non-domestic release
49-52	Beyblade G Revolution: Vol.17	April 23, 2004	No non-domestic release

On August 12, 2014, the first season was released in North America as a 8-disc DVD box set as well as an individual first volume containing the first seven episodes of the series, all by Cinedigm.

On November 30, 2018, Discotek Media announced that they have licensed the series for 1-disc dubbed SD Blu-ray releases, starting with Season 1 on January 29, 2019, then Season 2 on February 26, 2019, and finally Season 3 on March 26, 2019.
