= Baybridge, Northumberland =

Village in Northumberland, England

Coordinates: 54.849°N 2.072°W

Baybridge
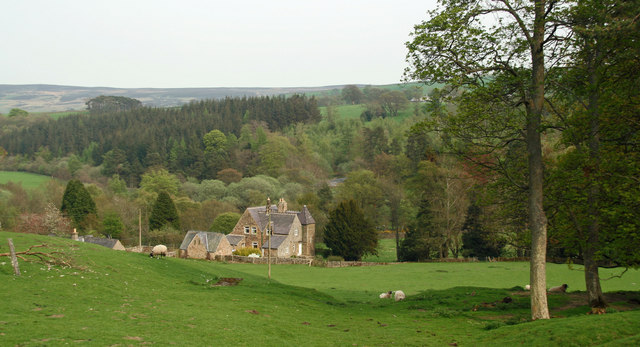

- Location within Northumberland
- OS grid reference: NY955505
- Unitary authority: Northumberland
- Ceremonial county: Northumberland
- Region: North East
- Country: England
- Sovereign state: United Kingdom
- Post town: CONSETT
- Postcode district: DH8
- Police: Northumbria
- Fire: Northumberland
- Ambulance: North East
- UK Parliament: Hexham

Baybridge is a small village in Northumberland, England, just to the west of Blanchland and on the border with County Durham. It is situated to the west of Consett and the Derwent Reservoir, between Newbiggin and Blanchland. Baybridge is approximately 100 miles from Edinburgh, Scotland, and historically home to Northumbrian border pipers.

The Methodist chapel, dated 1867, was possibly designed by S.S. Teulon (he designed a number of buildings in nearby Hunstanworth).

An inn, the Miners’ Arms, (now a private house) was built in the late 18th century and reflects the role of lead mining in the area. In 1866 this was the scene of a riot between local miners and Cornish miners over favouritism shown to the local miners.

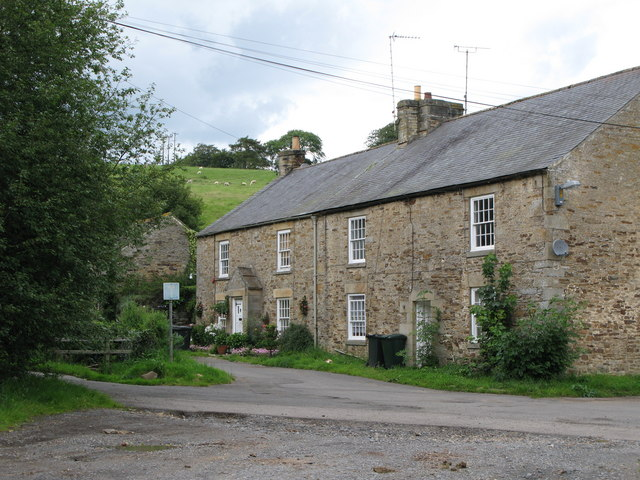
Cottages in Baybridge

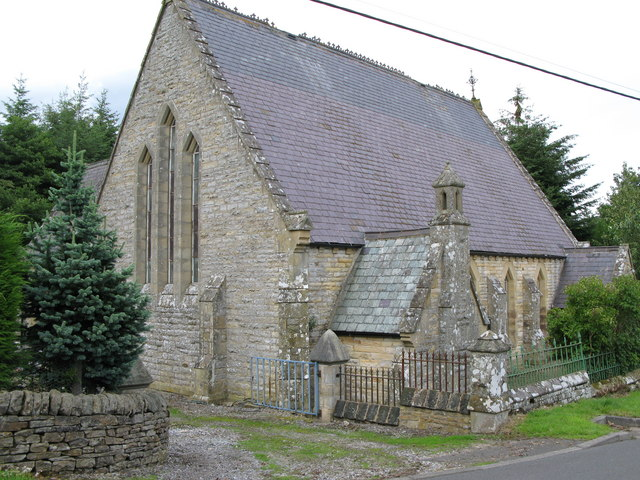
Wesleyan Providence Chapel

== Governance ==
Baybridge is in the parliamentary constituency of Hexham.
