= Daniel H. Bays =

American historian (1942–2019)

- Born: 1942; St. Joseph, Michigan, U.S.
- Died: May 9, 2019 (aged 77); Sunset Hills, Missouri, U.S.
- Occupation: Historian
- Known for: Christianity in China
- Spouse: Janice (née Gardner)

Academic background
- Education: University of Michigan; Stanford University

Academic work
- Discipline: History of Christianity in China; Missiology
- Institutions: Calvin College; University of Kansas

Daniel H. Bays (1942 – May 9, 2019) was an American historian of China, best known for his works on Christianity in China.

== Biography ==
Bays was born in 1942 in St. Joseph, Michigan, received his B.A. in history from Stanford University in 1964, an M.A. in Far Eastern studies from the University of Michigan in 1967, and a PhD in history of modern China from the University of Michigan in 1971. His PhD dissertation was on the Chinese politician Zhang Zhidong in the midst of China's late-imperial quest for modernity.

After completing his PhD, Bays took up a post teaching history at the University of Kansas, directing the Center for East Asian Studies and becoming a full professor in 1985. After working there for thirty years, in 2000, Bays moved to the History Department of Calvin College, where he held the Spoelhof chair from 2000–2002. He retired from Calvin College in 2012 and was appointed as professor emeritus, though he relocated with his wife Janice to Kansas City, Missouri.

In 1984, when Bays was a Fulbright scholar in Taiwan, he received a letter from the historian of China, John K. Fairbank, who encouraged him to conduct a more systematic study of Christianity in China, a topic Bays had recently begun work on. This would lead to his launch of the History of Christianity in China Project, which resulted in the edited volume Christianity in China: From the Eighteenth Century to the Present, published in 1996.

Bays died on May 9, 2019, after a lengthy battle with Parkinson's disease.

== Works ==
=== Books ===
- Bays, Daniel H. (2011). A New History of Christianity in China. New York: Wiley. ISBN 978-1-4443-4284-0.
- Bays, Daniel H. (2016). China Enters the Twentieth Century: Chang Chih-Tung and the Issues of a New Age, 1895-1909 (revised ed.). Ann Arbor, MI: University of Michigan Press. ISBN 978-0-472-75018-4.

=== Edited ===
- Bays, Daniel H.; Wacker, Grant, eds. (2010). The Foreign Missionary Enterprise at Home: Explorations in North American Cultural History. Tuscaloosa, AL: University of Alabama Press. ISBN 978-0-8173-5640-8.
- Bays, Daniel; Widmer, Ellen (2009). China's Christian Colleges: Cross-Cultural Connections, 1900-1950. Stanford, CA: Stanford University Press. ISBN 978-0-8047-7632-5.
- Bays, Daniel H., ed. (1996). Christianity in China: From the Eighteenth Century to the Present. Stanford, CA: Stanford University Press. p. ix. ISBN 978-0-8047-3651-0.
