= Bayes =

Bayes is a surname. Notable people with the surname include:

- Andrew Bayes (born 1978), American football player
- Gilbert Bayes (1872–1953), British sculptor
- Jasmine Bayes, British actress
- Jessie Bayes (1876–1970), British artist
- Joshua Bayes (1671–1746), English nonconformist minister and father of Thomas
- Nora Bayes (1880–1928), American singer and actress
- Paul Bayes (born 1953), Bishop in the Church of England
- Thomas Bayes (1702–1761), British mathematician, statistician and religious leader
- Walter Bayes (1869–1956), British painter

== See also ==
- Bayesian probability, Bayes' theorem, and Bayes estimator, concepts in probability and statistics named after Thomas Bayes
