= Beigoma =

Japanese spinning top toy

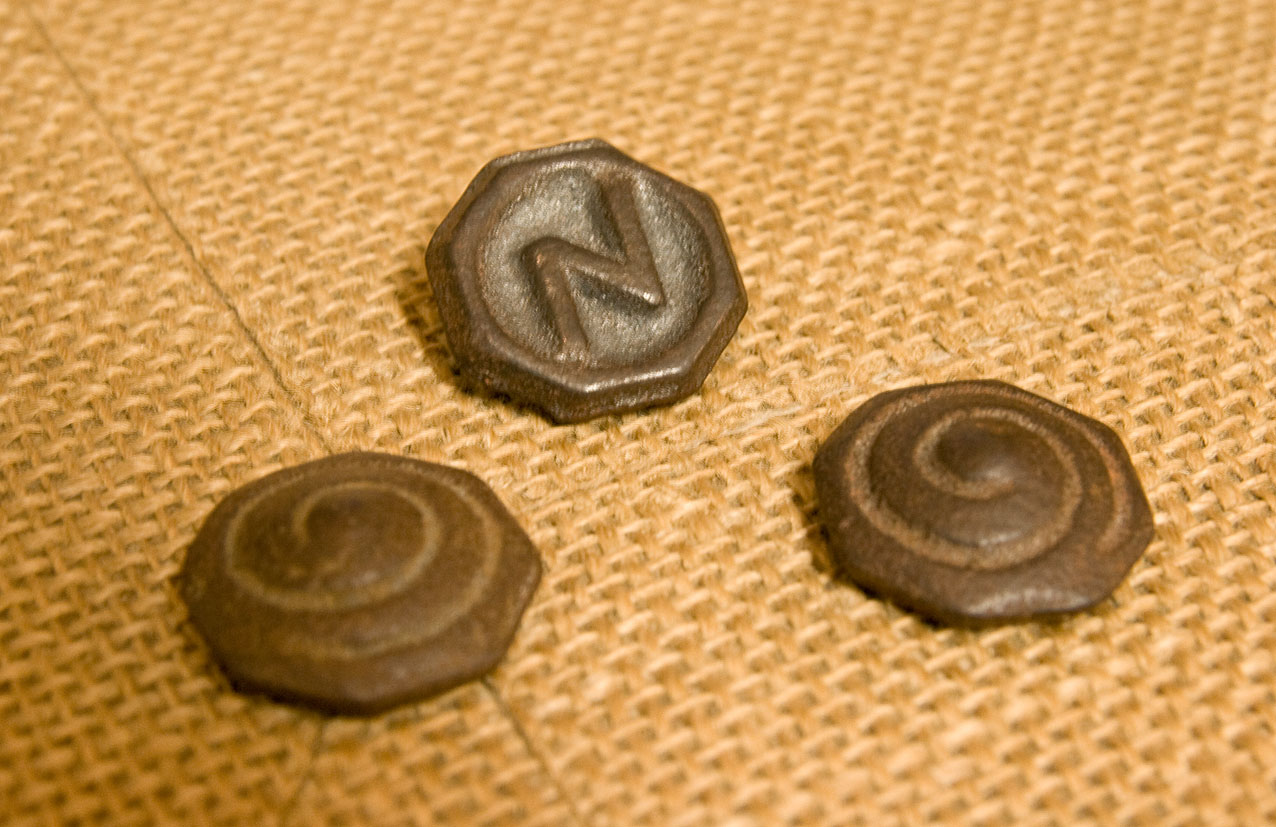
Beigoma spinning top toys

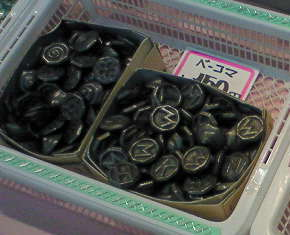
Beigoma displayed for sale

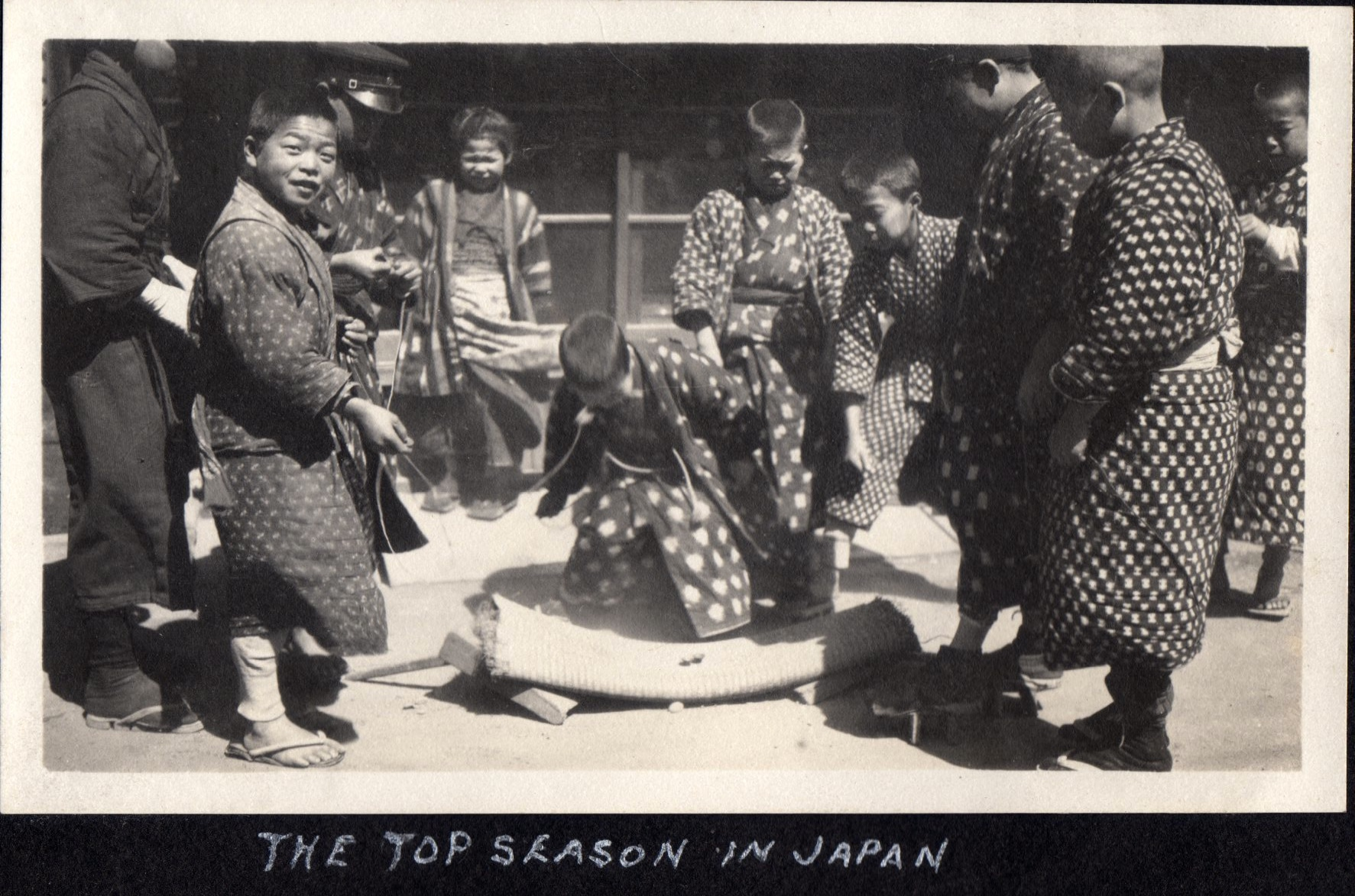
Spinning Tops (1914)

The beigoma (Japanese: ベーゴマ) is a traditional Japanese top that is approximately 3 cm in diameter and often decorated with kanji. When spun correctly, the beigoma makes a humming sound.

== Gameplay ==
Players wrap their tops in thin, 60-cm long cords which they use to launch the tops onto the playing surface of a canvas fabric sheet partially stretched over a bucket or similar items. The winner is the player whose top spins the longest or successfully knocks the opponent's top out of the playing area. Players will modify their tops to accommodate different play-styles by methods such as filing away material to change the shape of the top, adding in material like wax or lead to change the distribution of weight, and fine tuning via sanding imperfections caused by the casting process.

== History ==
The koma may have come to Japan from China, and it became popular in the Kamakura period. Well known by the 17th-century Edo period, the beigoma was originally made by filling spiral seashells (called "Bai") with sand and sealing them with molten wax. By the 20th century, the toys were made of lead and later of cast metal. Their popularity peaked in the first half of the 20th century before falling out of favour as newer postwar toys became available.

The advent of the modern line of battling tops called Beyblade (introduced in 1999) has caused a resurgence in interest in beigoma. However, as of 2001, there was only one factory still manufacturing traditional beigoma.
