= Battling Tops =

Board game

1986 version by Ideal Games

Battling Tops is a children's game invented by Eddy Goldfarb and first manufactured by Ideal in 1968. In the game, players launch spinning tops into an arena with the aim to have the final standing spinning top. The game has similarities to gasing pangkah, a traditional Malay sport.

== Game play ==
Two to four players launch spinning tops into an arena. The object of the game is to have the last standing spinning top. The game takes place on a circular concave arena with four spinning top launch positions. Players wind a string (attached to a pull tab) around their tops, place them in the launch positions, then pull the tab vigorously to release the top. The concave surface forces the tops together to battle. The outcome is somewhat indeterminate, but there is a slight element of skill. Pegs in holes on the rim of the arena mark victories. The first to win ten battles wins the game.

== Characters ==
There were six different colored tops to choose from—Hurricane Hank, Twirling Tim, Dizzy Dan, Smarty Smitty, Super Sam, and Tricky Nicky—although only four could battle at one time. The tops were composed of octagonal discs slipped over a ridged shaft that had a notch to engage the string. The game came with a sheet of colored stickers to place on the discs. Ostensibly the stickers were to match the color of the disc and the shaft, but it was possible to mix and match shafts, discs, and stickers (with the proviso that the stickers only stuck once). In the new version of the game, Smarty Smitty has been replaced by Cyclone Steve. In the 1968 version there was an 8 top version that included Fighting Frank and Rocky Rocko but only four colors, therefore you had four sets of two. The six player sets had red, yellow, green, light blue, white, and orange.

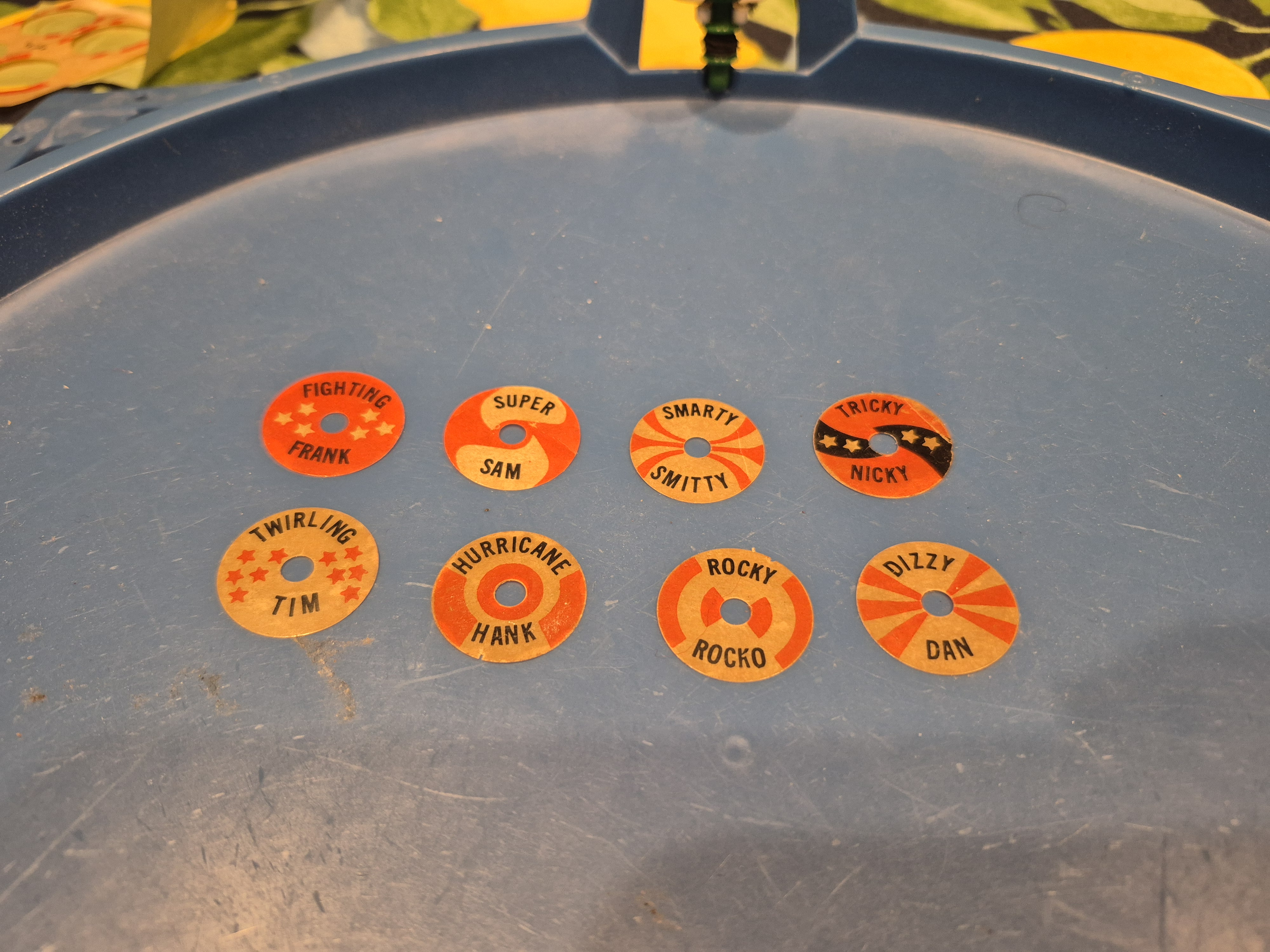
Eight top characters – 1968 version

== Publications history ==
In 1977 it was renamed Battling Spaceships in response to Star Wars fever. After Ideal was sold in 1982, Marx took over the game. By the late 1980s, the game was out of production. In 2003, Mattel rereleased Battling Tops.

== Reviews ==
- Games and Puzzles

== See also ==
- Beyblade
- Battle Strikers
