= The Bay School of San Francisco =

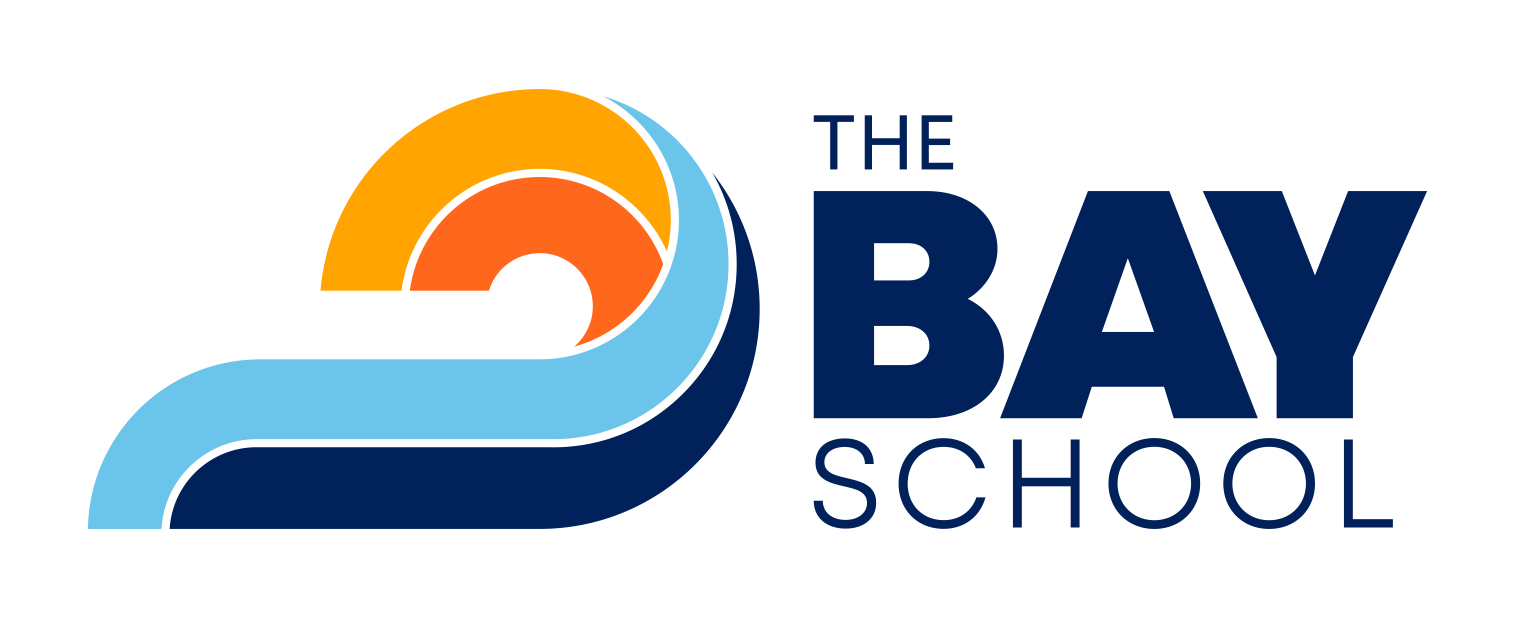

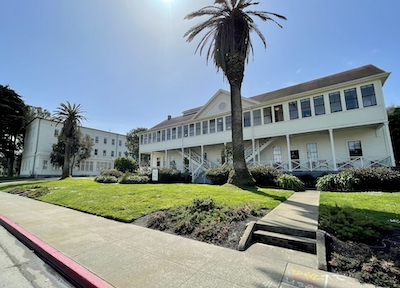
- The Bay School of San Francisco buildings at 36 Lincoln and 35 Keyes Avenue

Location
- 35 Keyes Avenue; San Francisco, California 94129; United States; 37.80045°N 122.45597°W

Information
- Type: Private
- Established: 2004
- NCES School ID: A0500717
- Head of school: Luke W. Felker
- Faculty: 100
- Teaching staff: 50 (on an FTE basis)
- Grades: 9–12
- Enrollment: 442
- Student to teacher ratio: 9:1
- Color: Navy blue
- Athletics: Yes
- Athletics conference: BCL
- Mascot: Blue the Breaker
- Nickname: Bay
- Team name: Breakers
- Accreditations: Western Association of Schools and Colleges, National Association of Independent Schools
- Affiliation: Mastery Transcript Consortium
- Website: Official website

The Bay School of San Francisco is a private coeducational college preparatory school in San Francisco, California. The school opened in 2004.

== History ==
The Bay School opened in the Presidio in 2004; at that time, a single class of 9th graders made up the student body. During the first school year, students attended classes in a temporary building, a "long, majestic white building on Schofield Road facing the bay". In August 2005, the school moved to 35 Keyes Avenue and has since added two nearby buildings in the Presidio.

== Enrollment ==
The school's enrollment is 442 students as of 2024. The Bay School uses an inclusive tuition model, in which there are no additional fees after tuition (except bus transportation).

== Curriculum and features ==
In 2018, The Bay School implemented an experiential learning program, with a schedule of two-semester terms and two "immersive" terms per academic year. During Immersive terms, students take one class for three weeks.

Interdisciplinary and specialized courses include a study of water and politics in the American West, field geology, and biotechnology.

== Athletics ==
The Bay School fields teams in 12 sports: Soccer, lacrosse, flag football, baseball, softball, basketball, volleyball, tennis, cross country, track and field, sailing, and golf.
